= Deanery of Holsworthy =

The Deanery of Holsworthy is part of the Archdeaconry of Barnstaple, one of the four archdeaconries in the Diocese of Exeter.

== Parishes of the Holsworthy Deanery ==
The parishes of the Holsworthy Deanery are:

- Abbots Bickington
- Ashwater
- Beaworthy
- Black Torrington
- Bradford, Devon with Cookbury
- Bradworthy
- Bridgerule
- Bulkworthy
- Clawton
- Halwill
- Highampton
- Hollacombe
- Holsworthy St Peter's and St Paul's Church, Holsworthy
- Milton Damerel
- Putford West Putford
- Pyworthy with Pancrasweek
- Sutcombe
- Tetcott with Luffincott St James's Church, Luffincott
- Thornbury, Devon
