= Black Torrington Hundred =

Ancient administrative unit of Devon, England

The hundred of Black Torrington was the name of one of thirty two ancient administrative units of Devon, England.

The parishes in the hundred were: Abbots Bickington; Ashbury; Ashwater; Beaworthy; Belstone; Black Torrington; Boyton (Cornwall) (part); Bradford; Bradworthy; Bridgerule; Broadwoodkelly; Clawton; Cookbury; Exbourne; Halwill; Hatherleigh; Highampton; Hollacombe; Holsworthy; Honeychurch; Inwardleigh; Jacobstowe; Luffincott; Milton Damerel; Monkokehampton; Northlew; North Petherwin; Pancrasweek; Pyworthy; Sampford Courtenay; St Giles on the Heath; Sutcombe; Tetcott; Thornbury; Werrington and West Putford.

== See also ==
- List of hundreds of England and Wales - Devon
