= Arscott (surname) =

Arscott is a surname. Notable people with the surname include:

- Arthur Arscott
- Caroline Arscott, historian of art
- David Arscott, BBC radio presenter, and local historian
- Felix Arscott, English mathematician
- John Arscott (1613–1675), English landowner
- John Arscott (MP)
- Jonathan Arscott, English cricketer
- Luke Arscott, rugby player
- Nicky Arscott, British poet and artist
- Noel Arscott, Jamaican politician
- Tom Arscott, rugby player
- Vanessa Arscott, murder victim
- Arscott of Tetcott, an English family, of Tetcott, Devon
