= Sheepwash, Devon =

Village in Devon, England

Coordinates: 50.8368°N 4.1509°W

Sheepwash
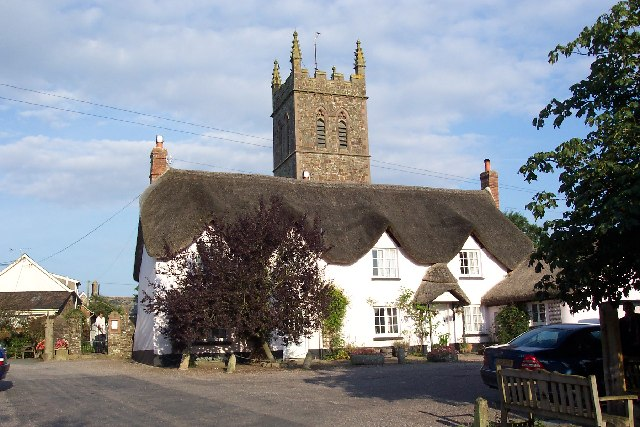
- Sheepwash

- Location within Devon
- OS grid reference: SS248106
- District: Torridge
- Shire county: Devon
- Region: South West
- Country: England
- Sovereign state: United Kingdom
- Post town: BEAWORTHY
- Postcode district: EX21
- Police: Devon and Cornwall
- Fire: Devon and Somerset
- Ambulance: South Western

Sheepwash is a village and civil parish on the southern border of the local government district of Torridge, Devon, England. The parish, which lies about nine miles ENE of the town of Holsworthy, about eight miles south of Great Torrington and about ten miles north-west of Okehampton, is surrounded clockwise from the north by the parishes of Buckland Filleigh, Highampton and Black Torrington. Its southern boundary follows the River Torridge and most of its other boundaries are along watercourses too. In 2001 its population was 254, lower than the 326 residents it had in 1901.

The name Sheepwash is first documented in 1166 (as Schepewast) and means, as it sounds, a place where sheep were washed before shearing.

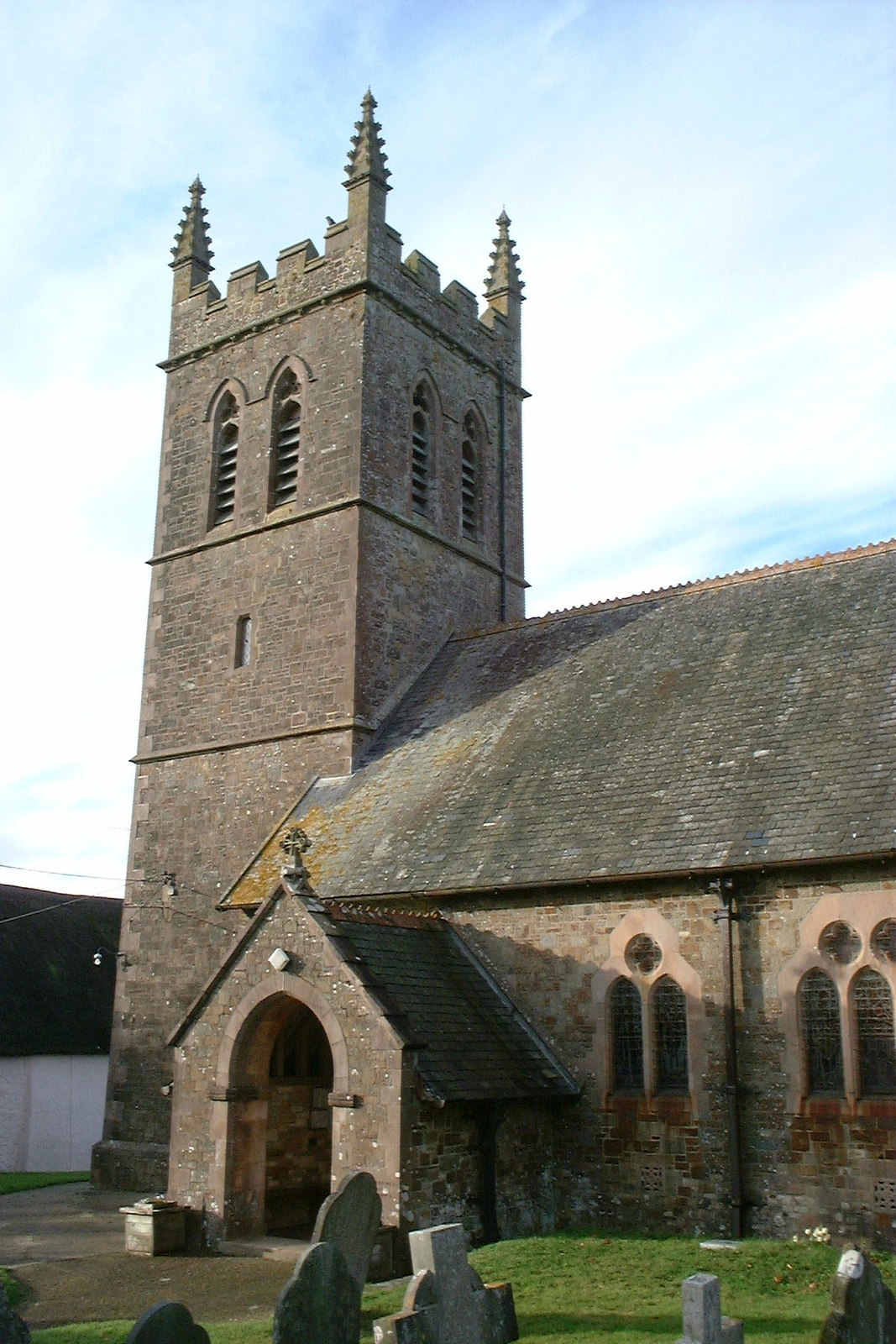
Sheepwash parish church

The parish church, which is in the village, is dedicated to St Lawrence. It was completely rebuilt in 1880 and was described by W. G. Hoskins in 1954 as "dull". Other buildings worthy of notice in the parish are Newcourt Barton, about a mile north-east of the village, which dates from the late 16th century with 18th-century and later alterations; and Totleigh Barton which mostly dates to the 16th and 17th centuries, but has surviving medieval features. It once had a private chapel.

The Half Moon Inn in the village is a traditional fishing inn with rights to the fishing on several miles of the River Torridge.
