= Tetcott =

Village in Devon, England

Coordinates: 50°44′N 4°22′W

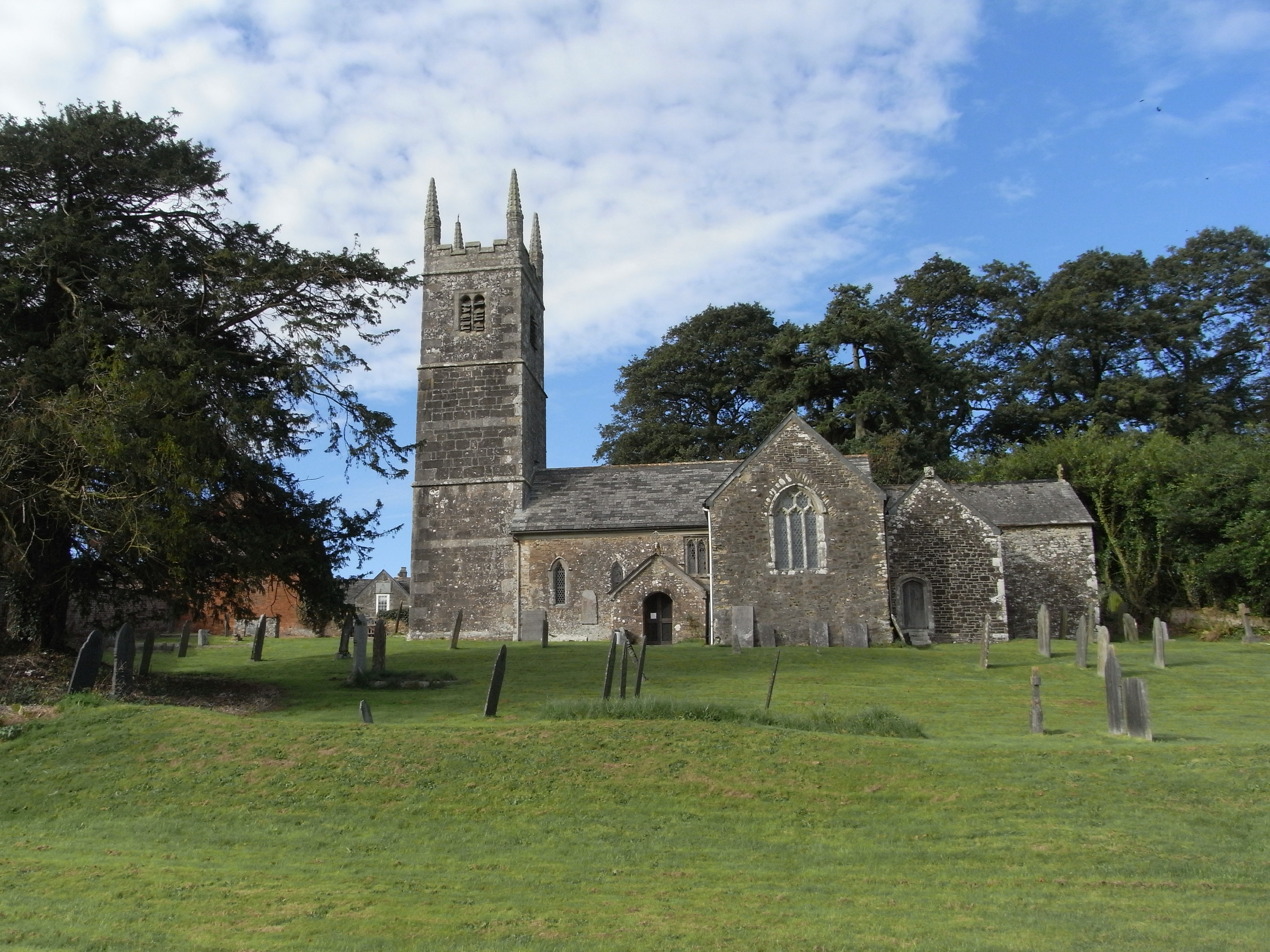
- Holy Cross Church, Tetcott, Devon, viewed from south. Behind the church is Tetcott Manor House.

- Location within Devon
- Population: 110 (2001 census)
- Civil parish: Tetcott
- District: Torridge
- Shire county: Devon
- Region: South West
- Country: England
- Sovereign state: United Kingdom

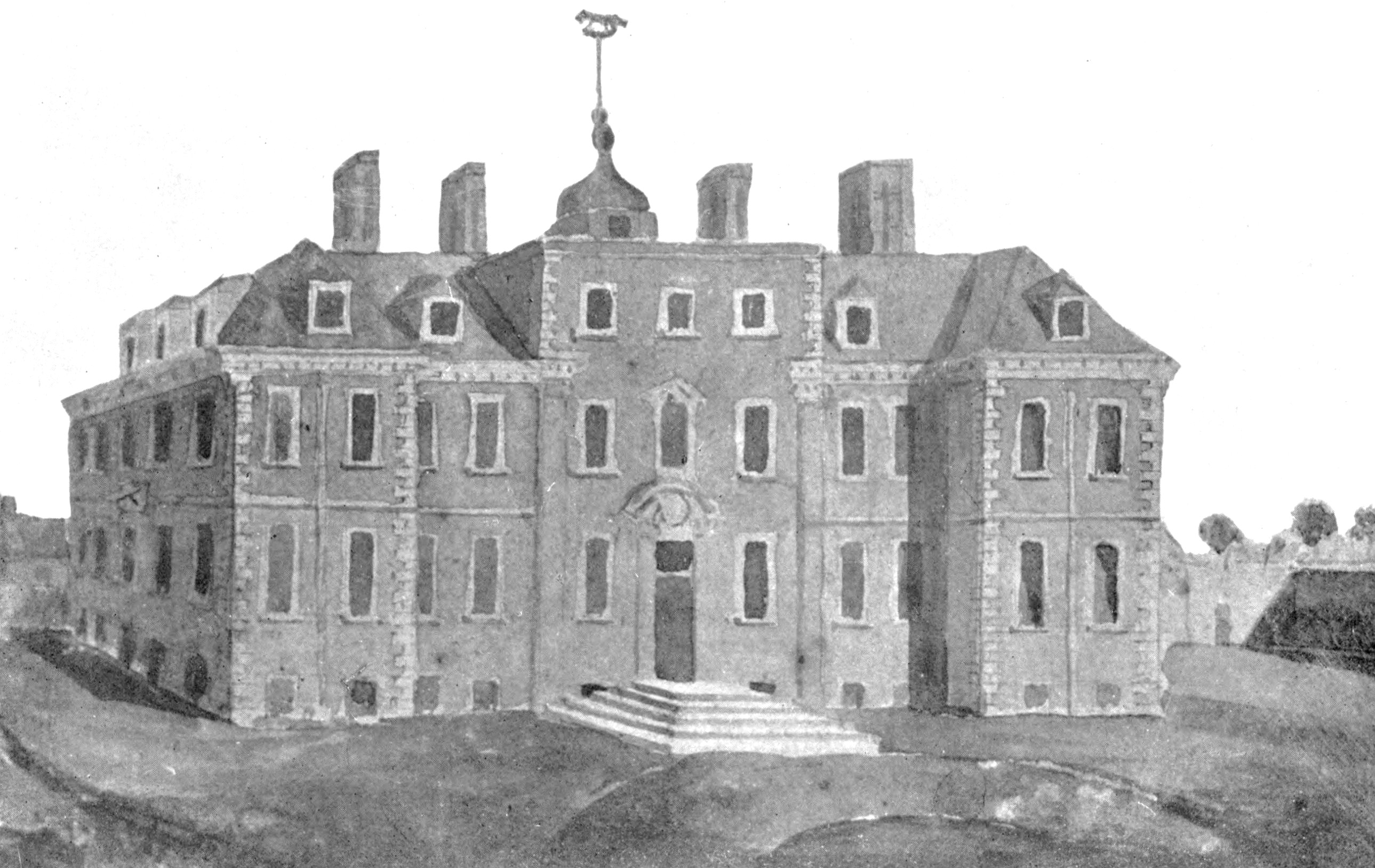
The Queen Anne style Tetcott House built by the Arscott family in about 1700 and demolished 1831

Tetcott is a civil parish, small settlement and former manor (once the home of the Arscotts of Tetcott) in Devon, England. The parish lies about five miles south of the town of Holsworthy and is bordered on the north by the parish of Clawton, on the east by a small part of Ashwater, and on the south by Luffincott. It forms part of the local government district of Torridge, and its western boundary is the River Tamar which forms the Cornish border. In 2001 its population was 110, half that of a century earlier (220 in 1901).

The settlement of Tetcott itself consists almost solely of the manor house and parish church of Holy Cross, but there are other hamlets in the parish, the largest of which is Lana about half a mile to the south-east.

== Parish church ==
The parish church was dedicated by the Bishop of Waterford in 1338 or 1339. Before the Reformation it was dedicated to the Trinity. In 1740 the parish feast day was said to have been 3 May (the date of the Invention of the True Cross) probably leading, according to Nicholas Orme, to its present dedication to "Holy Cross", the first record of which dates from 1742.

The present-day church has a Norman font and partly dates from the 13th century with some 16th-century additions, mainly the tower. The church was restored in 1890. It has one bell, though three are recorded in an inventory of 1553. A local tradition says that the treble bell at North Tamerton, across the River Tamar, came from Tetcott church and John Taylor the bell-founder having recast North Tamerton's ring of five in the early 19th century sold the treble to Tetcott so that the parishioners at North Tamerton could hear it across the valley and decide to acquire it.

The south transept of the church, known as the Arscott Chapel, contains an ornate pew for the family and notable pew railings dating from around 1700. There are also four memorials to members of that family, the most elaborate to John Arscott (died 1675), who was Sheriff of Devon, and his wife. The others are noted below.

== Arscott of Tetcott ==
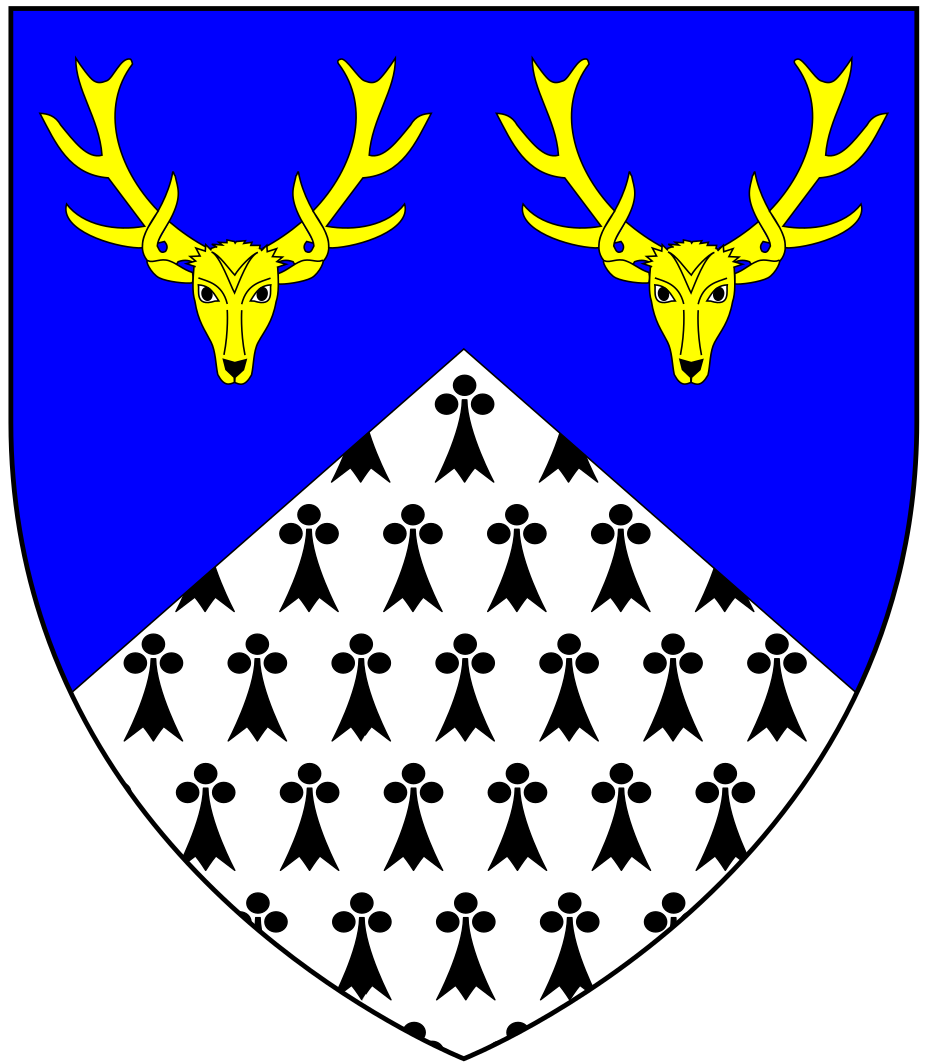
Arms of Arscott: Per chevron azure and ermine in chief two buck's heads cabossed or

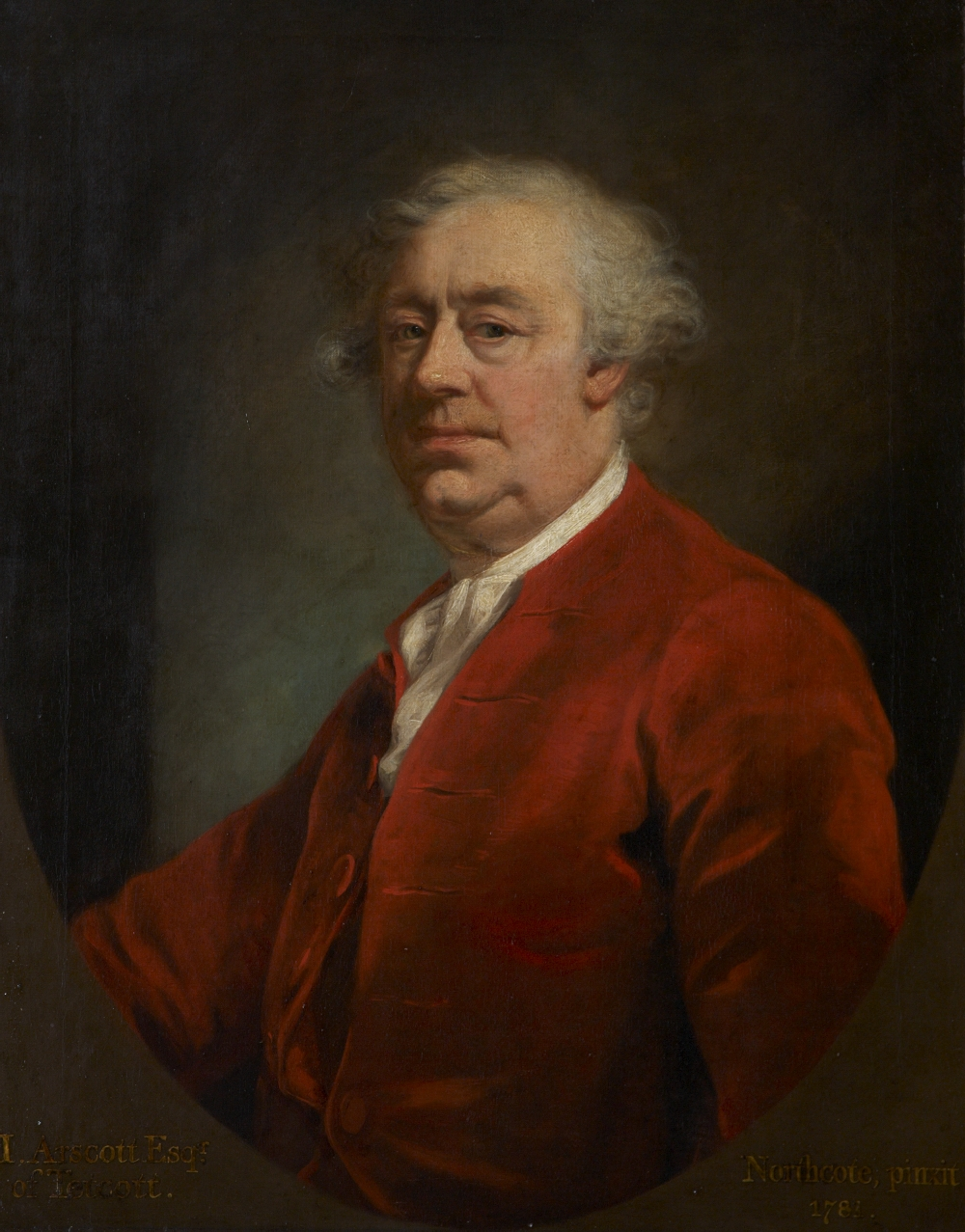
John Arscott (died 1788), the last of the Arscotts of Tetcott. Portrait by James Northcote. National Trust, collection of Saltram House, Devon

W. G. Hoskins described the Arscotts as one of the ancient families of freeholders that rose to the ranks of the squirearchy over a period of 300 years or so by the steady accumulation of property, mostly through marriage. Originating at Arscott (now known as South Arscott, north of the town of Holsworthy), a junior branch of the family moved to Tetcott in about 1550.

Arthur Arscott (1554–1618) built a new manor house at Tetcott in 1603, which survives today in expanded form. A new and larger house was built adjacent to it by his descendants during the reign of Queen Anne (1702–1714). (Note: Hoskins states it was "enlarged and remodelled", contrary to Devon Perspectives which states the two houses were on separate sites.) At this time new outbuildings were built in brick, unusual in Devon, some of which survive. The Queen Anne style house was demolished in 1831.

=== Descent ===
- John Arscott (died 1558) of Tetcott, was the fourth son of John Arscott (died 1541) of Arscott by his wife Margery Floyer, daughter of Richard Floyer. (Note: John of Tetcott's eldest brother was John Arscott (died 1563) of Arscott who founded the Arscotts of Dunsland in the parish of Bradford, having married Phillipa Battyn, the Dunsland heiress. The 17th-century mansion Dunsland House was purchased by the National Trust in 1954 and burnt down and was demolished in 1967.) John married Elizabeth Walter, daughter of John Walter of Broxbourne, Hertfordshire. His eldest son and heir was:
- Arthur Arscott (1554–1618), of Tetcott, who married Mary Langsford, daughter of John Langsford of Thursleton. His eldest son and heir was:
- Edmund Arscott (1588–1656), of Tetcott, who married Mary Walrond (died 1652), daughter of William Walrond (died 1627) of Bradfield, Uffculme.
- John Arscott (1613–1675), Sheriff of Devon at his death. He married Gertrude Calmady (died 1699), (Note: She was the daughter of Sir Shilston Calmady (1585–1645) of Langdon, Wembury, who was killed during the Civil War near Ford Abbey and was buried in the nearby church at Membury where exists his monument.) but died childless leaving as his heir to Tetcott his nephew:
- John Arscott (died 1708), of Tetcott (Note: Son of William Arscott (born 1617, living in 1675) by unknown wife.) who married as his second wife Prudence, of unrecorded family. His third son was Dennis Arscott (1685–1721) of Ethy, Cornwall, Sheriff of Cornwall, whose daughter, Jane Arscott (born 1678) married Sir John Molesworth, 3rd Baronet (1668–1723) in 1699, leaving descendants who eventually inherited Tetcott in 1788 (see below). A mural monument exists in Tetcott Church to John Arscott and his two wives. By Prudence John Arscott had a son and heir:
- Arthur Arscott (1683–1763), of Tetcott, who married Elizabeth Trefusis (died 1714), daughter of Francis Trefusis of Trefusis in the parish of Mylor, Cornwall, which family in 1794 succeeded as Barons Clinton. His mural monument exists in Tetcott Church. His eldest son and heir was:
- John Arscott (1719–1788), of Tetcott, who died without having been legally married and without issue. In the style of a mediaeval lord, he kept as a member of his household a dwarf jester named Black John. The eccentric ways of him and his household were described in Footprints of Former Men in Cornwall (1870) by Robert Stephen Hawker, and also in Devonshire Characters and Strange Events (1908) by Sabine Baring-Gould. In this unusual respect he resembled his contemporary Devonian John Fulford (1736–1780) of Great Fulford, known as "Squire John", also one of the last in England to employ a full-time fool "dressed in the motley". His mural monument survives in Tetcott Church. His heir was his cousin Sir William Molesworth, 6th Baronet (1758–1798) of Pencarrow in Cornwall.

== Molesworth of Tetcott ==
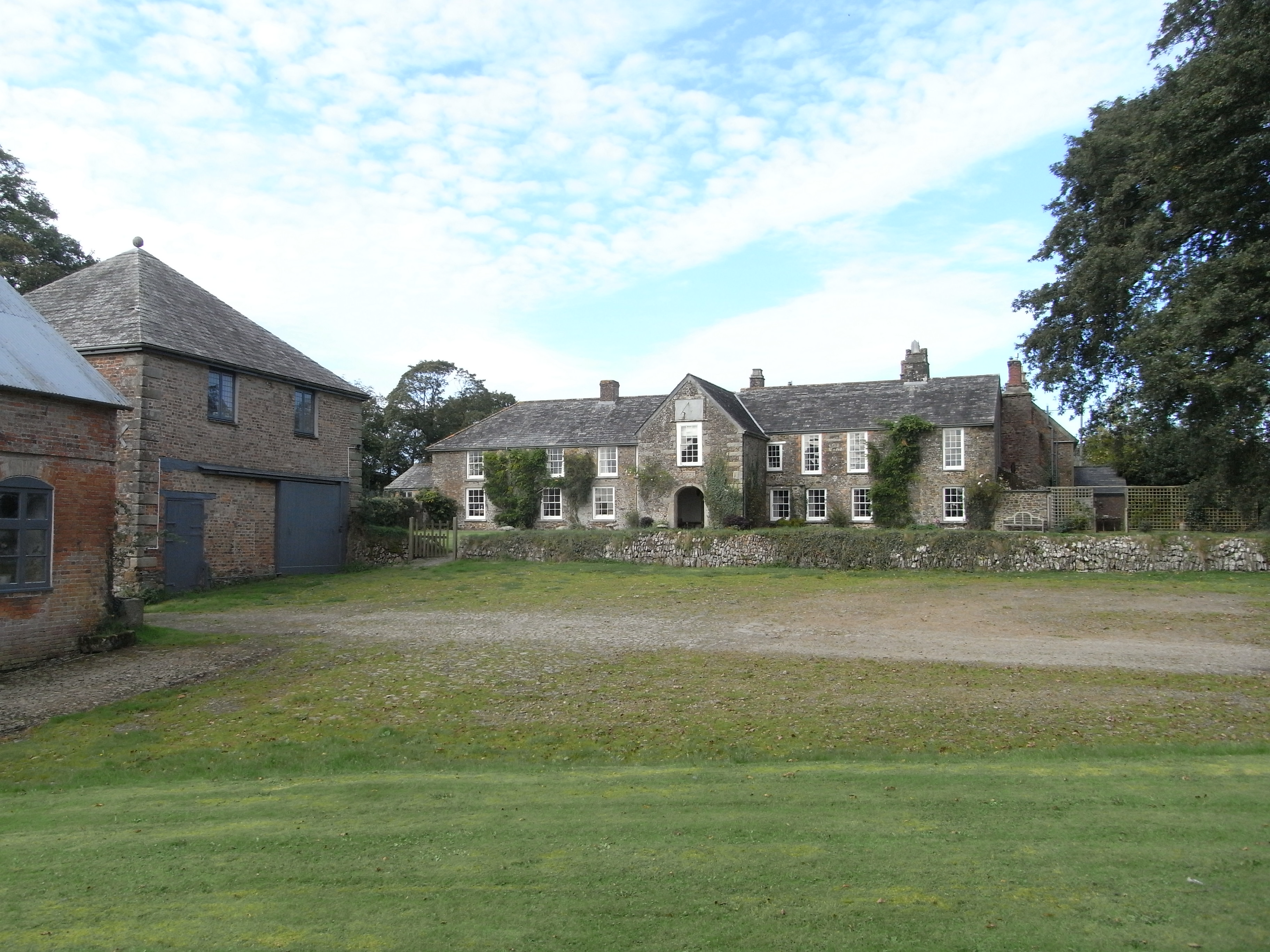
Tetcott Manor House in 2013, still a seat of the Molesworth-St Aubyn baronets. The brick building to the left with rusticated quoins may have been associated with the mansion demolished in 1831.

Following the Arscotts, Tetcott was inherited by their distant cousins the family of Molesworth, later Molesworth-St Aubyn, of Pencarrow, Cornwall, who continue there until the present day. The 7th and 15th Molesworth-St Aubyn baronets had as a first-name "Arscott". In 1831, whilst retaining the original manor house used some time later as a farmhouse, they demolished the adjacent Queen Anne mansion, an act much resented by the local population, and built in its place a "Gothic cottage" to serve as a hunting lodge. This was burned down, apparently by disgruntled locals five years later.

In 1925, as a secondary residence to Pencarrow, the family moved into the original manor house, formerly let as a farmhouse, which survives today. It is a long two-storey building built of rubble stone. Above the round arch of the central two-storey porch was reset, in the 20th century, the 1603 datestone taken from Tetcott Mill.

== Tetcott hunt ==
The last of the Arscotts had been a keen hunter, and kennelled his pack of hounds at Tetcott. Later the sporting rights were acquired by Vincent Calmady who in about 1872 formed a pack of otter-hounds. In 1879 he recommenced fox-hunting on the Tetcott country, and the current South Tetcott Hunt and Tetcott Hunt continue today.

HMS Tetcott a Type II British Hunt class destroyer was built for the Royal Navy during World War II, named after the hunt.

== Sources ==
- Hawker, Robert Stephen (1903). Footprints of Former Men in Far Cornwall.
- Hoskins, W.G., A New Survey of England: Devon, London, 1959 (first published 1954)
- Lauder, Rosemary (2005). Vanished Houses of North Devon, chapter on Tetcott Manor. Tiverton. pp. 39–41.
- Luke, W.H. (1880). J. Arscott of Tetcote, Esq., and his Jester, Black John. Plymouth.
- Pevsner, Nikolaus & Cherry, Bridget, The Buildings of England: Devon, London, 2004
- Vivian, Lt.Col. J. L. (1895). The Visitations of the County of Devon: Comprising the Heralds' Visitations of 1531, 1564 & 1620.
