= Monkokehampton =

Village in Devon, England

Coordinates: 50.831077°N 4.0143975°W

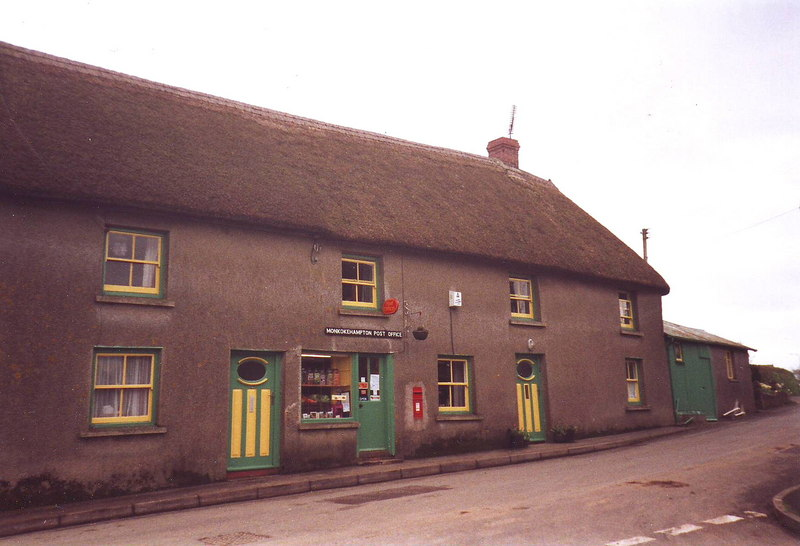
- Monkokehampton Post Office in 1995

- Location within Devon
- Area: 4.6258 km^{2} (1.7860 sq mi)
- Population: 139 (2011)
  - Density: 30/km^{2} (78/sq mi)
- OS grid reference: SS582054
- Civil parish: Monkokehampton
- District: West Devon
- Shire county: Devon
- Region: South West
- Country: England
- Sovereign state: United Kingdom
- Post town: WINKLEIGH
- Postcode district: EX19
- Dialling code: 01837
- Police: Devon and Cornwall
- Fire: Devon and Somerset
- Ambulance: South Western
- UK Parliament: Central Devon

Monkokehampton is a village and civil parish in the West Devon district, in the county of Devon, England. The village lies on the River Okement, about 3 miles (4.8 km) east-north-east of Hatherleigh. The parish is bounded by Hatherleigh, Exbourne, Broadwoodkelly and Iddesleigh, and had a population of 139 at the 2011 Census.

Alternative names for Monkokehampton are "Monk Okehampton", "Okehampton" and "Okehampton Monk".

== Features ==
There are 16 listed buildings in Monkokehampton. Monkokehampton has a church called All Saints.

== History ==
Monkokehampton was recorded in the Domesday Book as Monuchementone/Monacochamentona. Monk Okehampton once belonged to Glastonbury Abbey. The parish was historically in the Black Torrington hundred. On the 25th of March 1885 Barntown, Upcott, and Lewersland were transferred from the parish of Monk Okehampton to the parish of Broadwood Kelly. The transferred area contained two houses in 1891.
