= John Arscott =

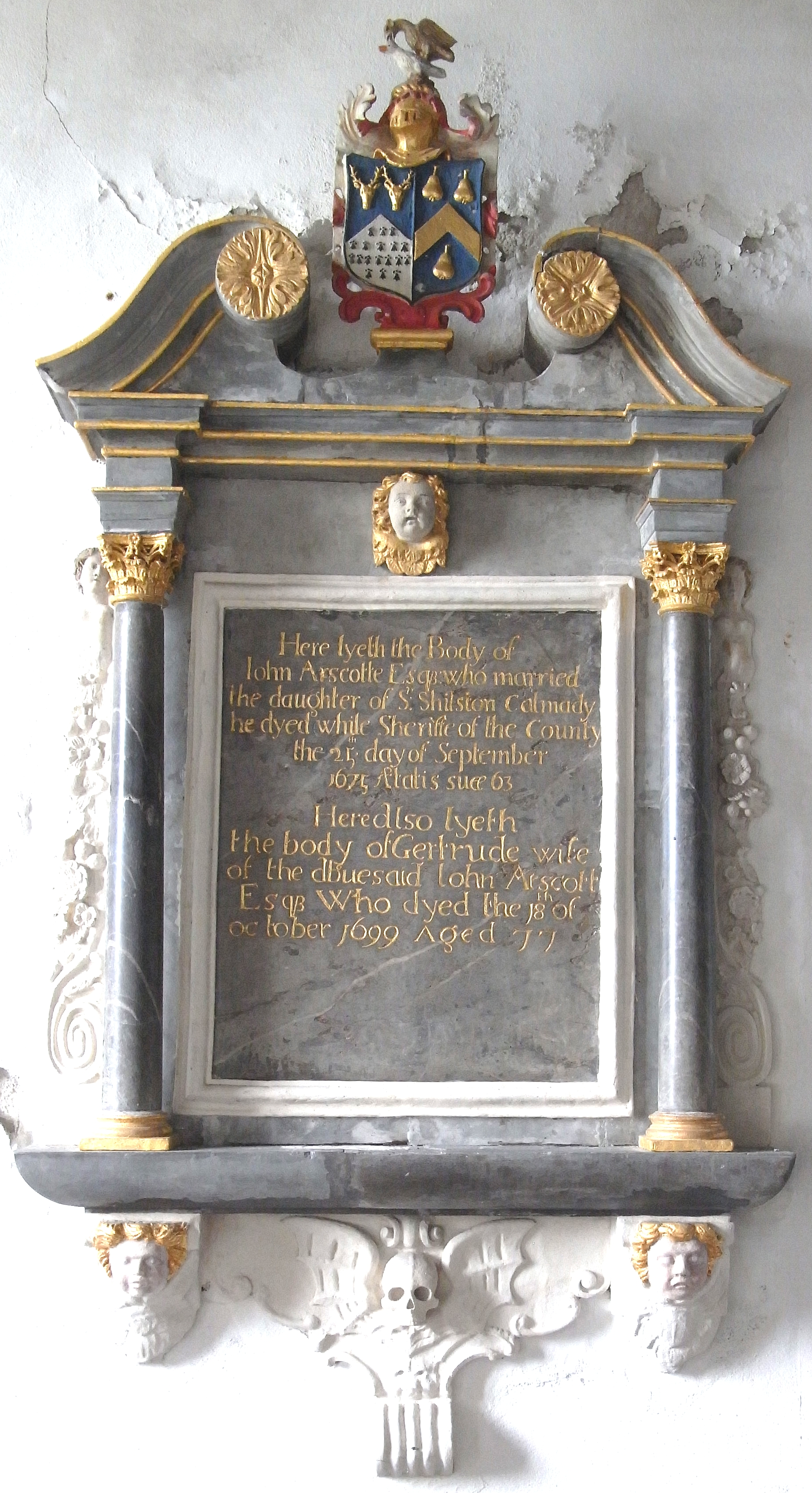
Monument to John Arscott, Holy Cross Church, Tetcott

John Arscott (1613–1675), of Tetcott, Devon, was Sheriff of Devon in 1675.

W. G. Hoskins described the Arscotts as one of the ancient families of freeholders that rose to the ranks of the squirearchy over a period of 300 years or so by the steady accumulation of property, mostly through marriage. Originating at Arscott (now known as South Arscott, north of the town of Holsworthy) in the time of Henry III, a junior branch of the family moved to Tetcott in about 1550.

John Arscott was the eldest son and heir of Edmund Arscott (1588–1656), of Tetcott, by his wife Mary Walrond (died 1652), daughter of William Walrond (died 1627) of Bradfield, Uffculme. Arthur Arscott (1554–1618), the sheriff's grandfather built a new manor house at Tetcott in 1603.

He married Gertrude Calmady (1622–1699), a daughter of Sir Shilston Calmady (1585–1645) of Langdon, Wembury, who was killed during the Civil War during the siege of Ford Abbey. In 1638 John's sister Mary Arscott had married Gertrude's half-brother John Calmady (1614 – before 1645) in Ashwater parish.

John Arscott died childless and was buried on 25 September 1675 at Tetcott. His heir was his nephew John Arscott (died 1708) of Tetcott (the son of his younger brother William), who married as his second wife Prudence, of unrecorded family. The younger John's third son was Dennis Arscott (1685–1721) of Ethy, Cornwall, Sheriff of Cornwall and his daughter was Jane Arscott (born 1678) who in 1699 married Sir John Molesworth, 3rd Baronet, whose later descendants inherited Tetcott in 1788.

A mural monument to John Arscott exists in the Arscott Chapel of Holy Cross Church, Tetcott. Recent research has shown John Arscott did have a daughter Mary baptized 19 June 1645 who married Lewis Coham in Black Torrington 22 Dec 1669.

== Sources ==
- Hoskins, W.G., A New Survey of England: Devon, London, 1959. (first published 1954)
- Pevsner, Nikolaus & Cherry, Bridget, The Buildings of England: Devon, London, 2004.
- Risdon, Tristram (d.1640), Survey of Devon, 1810 edition, London, 1810, p. 250
- Vivian, Lt.Col. J.L., (Ed.) The Visitations of the County of Devon, Comprising the Heralds' Visitations of 1531, 1564 & 1620. 2 vols, Exeter, 1895.
