= Holsworthy Hamlets =

Civil parish in northwest Devon, England

Coordinates: 50.89°N 4.35°W

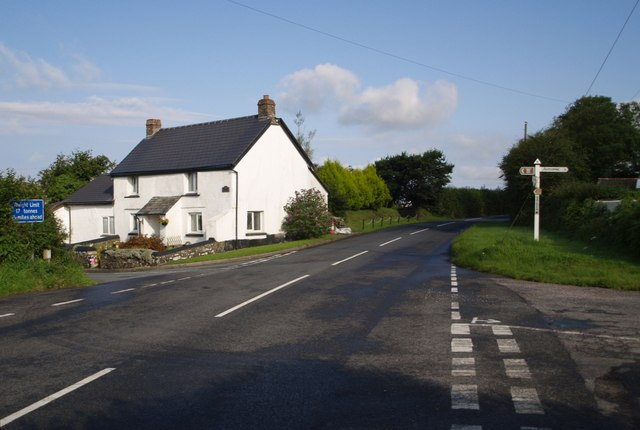
- Soldon Cross

- Location within Devon
- Population: 821 (2001 census)
- Civil parish: Holsworthy Hamlets
- District: Torridge
- Shire county: Devon
- Region: South West
- Country: England
- Sovereign state: United Kingdom

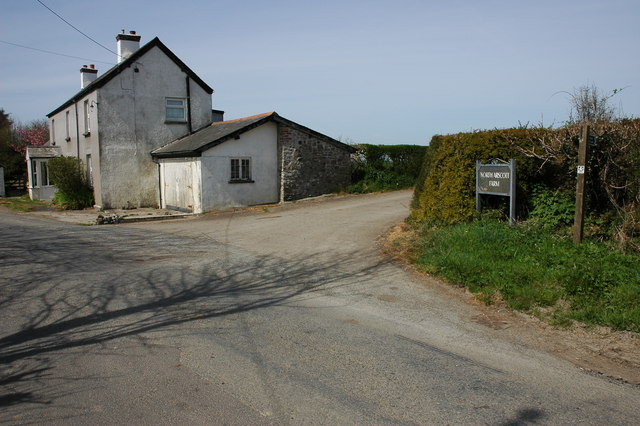
North Arscott Cottage

Holsworthy Hamlets is a civil parish in the northwest of Devon, England. It forms part of the local government district of Torridge and came into being on 1 April 1900 when the ecclesiastical parish of Holsworthy was split into two.

The parish almost surrounds the parish and town of Holsworthy, except on the east. It is surrounded clockwise from the north by the parishes of Bradworthy, Sutcombe, Milton Damerel, Thornbury, Cookbury, Hollacombe, Clawton, Pyworthy and Holsworthy, and Pancrasweek. In 2001 its population was 821, distributed among farms and hamlets such as Thorne and Chilsworthy (former Domesday manors), Youldon, Honeycroft, Vognacott, Merryfield, South Arscott (the original home of the Arscott family), Herdwick, Staddon and Chasty.

Soldon in the north of the parish is now a farmhouse, but in the 17th century it was a manor house of the Prideaux family and it retains many fittings of that period.

== Sources ==
- Day, W. I. Leeson (1934). Parochial Histories of Devonshire, No 2 – Holsworthy. The Devonshire Association.
