= Bradford, Devon =

Village and civil parish in Devon, England

Coordinates: 50°50′33″N 4°14′41″W

Bradford
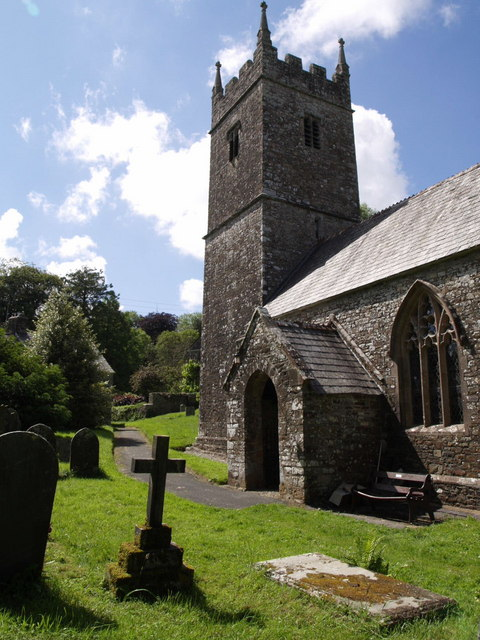
- The parish church in Bradford village

- Location within Devon
- Population: 359 (2001 census)
- Civil parish: Bradford
- District: Torridge
- Shire county: Devon
- Region: South West
- Country: England
- Sovereign state: United Kingdom
- Police: Devon and Cornwall
- Fire: Devon and Somerset
- Ambulance: South Western

Bradford is a village and civil parish in the local government district of Torridge, Devon, England. The parish, which lies about six miles east of the town of Holsworthy has part of its eastern boundary formed by the River Torridge, and it is surrounded clockwise from the north by the parishes of Milton Damerel, Shebbear, Black Torrington, Ashwater, Cookbury and Thornbury. In 2001 its population was 359, compared to 280 in 1901.

The parish church, dedicated to All Saints, is in the village of Bradford and mostly dates from the early 14th century although it has a Norman doorway and baptismal font. By the 19th century the church was in poor condition and was restored twice, in 1869 and in 1875–89.

Within the parish are several former manors mentioned in the Domesday book of 1086: Bradford, Dunsland, Henscott and Lashbrook. The 10th-century Bradford Manor was damaged by fire in around 1770. Purchased and then rebuilt in the 1870s the existing Manor was styled and rebuilt by J. T. English. Dunsland was the home of several notable Devon families and the fine house had just been extensively renovated by the National Trust when it was destroyed by fire in 1967.
