= Cookbury =

Village and civil parish in Devon, England

Coordinates: 50°50′06″N 4°16′00″W

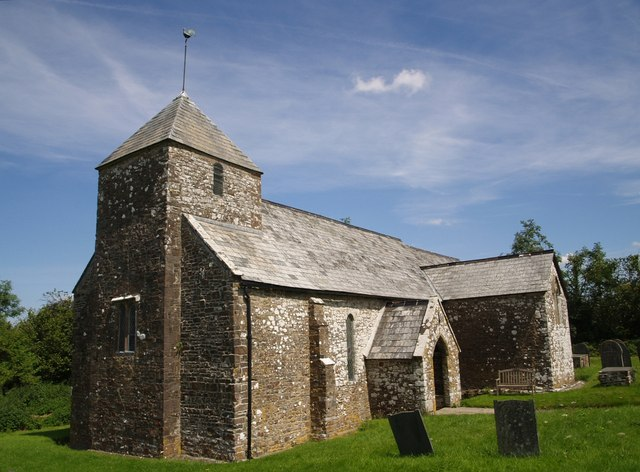
Cookbury parish church

Cookbury is a village and civil parish in the local government district of Torridge, Devon, England. The parish, which lies about five miles east of the town of Holsworthy, is surrounded clockwise from the north by the parishes of Thornbury, Bradford, Ashwater, Hollacombe, and Holsworthy Hamlets. In 2001 its population was 158, little changed from the 146 residents it had in 1901.

The parish church has an unusual dedication to St John the Baptist and the Seven Maccabees and still has its 13th-century tower and chancel. It was designated as redundant in 1982, but classed as a chapel-of-ease in 1987 and restored in 1992, united with the neighbouring parish of Bradford.

Walter de Stapledon, Bishop of Exeter from 1307 until his death in 1326, was born in the parish at Stapledon, now a farmhouse but once the mansion of the family.

The U.K. national cycle route 3 passes through Cookbury linking the Tarka Trail with Bude on the North Cornwall coast.

Within the parish of Bradford & Cookbury are National Trust Dunsland (featuring a SSSI) and a Forestry Commission woodland at Bramble Wood.
