= Dunsland =

Historic manor in Devon, England

Coordinates: 50°49′24″N 4°15′38″W

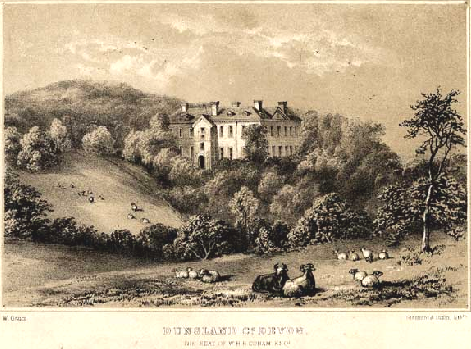
Mid 19th century engraving of Dunsland House

Dunsland is a historic manor and former house in the parish of Bradford (or Cookbury) near Holsworthy in Devon, England. It was successively home to the Arscott, Bickford, Coham and Dickinson families and, although the ownership records are incomplete, it is very likely that the estate passed in an unbroken line from the time of the Norman Conquest until 1947. The house was destroyed by fire in 1967, just after extensive restoration by the National Trust.

== Descent of the manor ==
A manor named Donesland in Devon appears in the Domesday Book, and is believed to refer to Dunsland. Before the Norman Conquest it was held by Wulfric, but in 1086 it was held by Cadio from Baldwin the Sheriff.

The 17th-century Devon historian Tristram Risdon stated that "Dunsland now Dunskind", in the parish of Bradford, was held by Richard Cadiho in 1242 or 1243, and remained held by the Cadiho family for eight generations. Risdon further stated that the last in the male line to live here was Robert Cadiho who left his lands to his daughter Thomazin. She was said to be the wife of John Daubernon, described as "warden of the stannary, and of the fees of the duchy of Cornwall" and who was "chosen one of the knights for the shire" in 1356 or 1357.

Risdon states that the manor then passed to the Batten family and then via Philippa, the daughter and heir of Humphrey Batten, to the Arscot family of which, at the time he was writing, the owner was Arthur Arscot.

In his work The Visitations of the County of Devon of 1895, John Lambrick Vivian set out a pedigree chart for the Arscotts of Dunsland. It starts with a John de Dunsland, passes through the Cade and Dabarnon families to the Battyn family, of which Humphry Battyn (died 15 November 1522) was the last. Vivian states that Humphry Battyn left his lands to his daughter Philippa and her husband John Arscott (died 1 May 1563) who was a lawyer of the Inner Temple, the son and heir of John Arscott (died 1541) of Arscott by his wife Margerie Floyer.

Vivian's pedigree shows that the estate descended through the Arscott family via Humphrey (died 1580) and John (died 1623) until 1662 when the death of Arthur Arscott without male progeny resulted in it eventually passing to his second daughter Grace, the widow of William Bickford of Bickford Town, Plympton St Mary who had died in 1659. Grace Bickford lived until 1686 and her son and heir was Arscott Bickford (died 1693), who enlarged and embellished the house which then mainly dated from about 1500 with additions made in the mid-16th century and in 1609. It then became one of the finest houses in North Devon, and survived almost unchanged until its destruction in 1967.

Arscott Bickford married three times and was succeeded by William, the eldest son of his third wife, Bridget. William also married three times and was succeeded on his death in 1740 by his son from his second marriage, named Arscott like his grandfather. On Arscott's death in 1771 his brother George was the successor to the estate and on George's death in 1795 it passed to his son, another Arscott. This third Arscott was said to have been a gambler and lost much of the family's money. He died childless in 1817 and the estate passed to his sister, Mary, who was married to Rev William Holland Coham, of Coham, Devon (died 1825).

William Coham's son, William Bickford Coham (died 1843) inherited the estate, as did his grandson in turn, William Holland Bickford Coham (died 1880). The grandson died childless and the estate passed to his sister Augusta who married Major Harvey Dickinson (died 1901) of the British Indian Madras Army. Her son Arscott Harvey Dickinson, said to have been the 29th owner in direct succession, sold the estate in 1947, having been unsuccessful in his struggle to keep the mansion house in good repair.

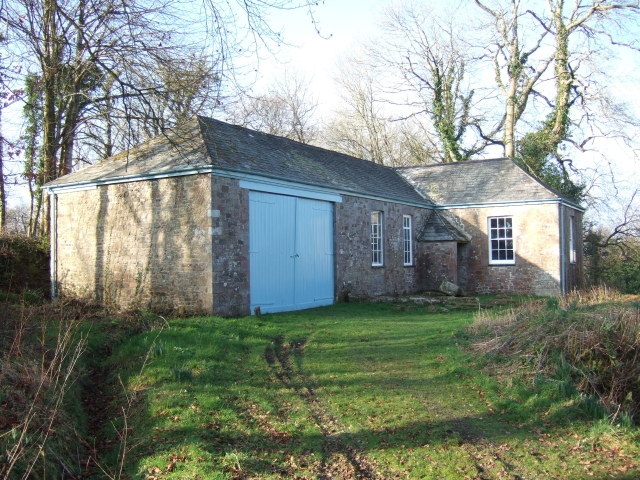
The coach house, the largest surviving structure on the site

== Fate of the house ==
The house with part of its estate was purchased at auction by a London speculator Mr de Savoury who was interested in the timber in the woodlands. It was then bought by Philip Tilden, an architect who attempted to restore the house, a job that remained incomplete on his death in 1954. His widow sold the property with 92 acres to the National Trust in the same year.

The National Trust spent an enormous sum on restoring the house and let it to tenant guardians. During the night of 17 November 1967 the house was destroyed by fire, with the walls left standing in such a precarious state that the decision was taken to demolish the whole structure and to fill up the basement with the rubble and level the site. Today, the land is still owned by the National Trust and it is maintained as a park with some features of the old estate still visible.

== Points of interest ==
The Dunsland estate features numerous points of interest including:

- The gate pillars to Dunsland House (SS 4160 0520) were listed on 26 January 1989 and have the English Heritage Building ID of 91576. The pillars are made of stone ashlar, used in decreasing size towards the top. It is thought the pillars date from the 17th century remodelling of the house
- Cadihos Well (SS 4110 0530) is a well of medieval origin well. Records show Dunsland to have been held by Baldwin by Cadiho in 1086 and it remained in the Cadiho family until 1428 when the male line died out. The well is shown in the British and Irish Archaeological Bibliography to be of medieval origin (1066-1540).
- The remains of the moat and fish stock pond located at SS 4105 0530 are the location where locally caught fish are likely to have been caught prior for use in the main house. The site, south west of Bramble Wood most likely show the site of the medieval manor house that was once at Dunsland before the early Tudor rebuilding on a new site.
- Although the main house was destroyed by fire, the kitchen garden, wall and engine house remain. SS 0290 0510
- Coach House (SS 4085 0510): Along with the old stable, the coach house also remains following the devastating fire that swept through Dunsland in 1967.
- An ancient duck decoy pond remains at the location SS 4080 0545. Decoy ponds have arms covered with nets into which wild birds were allured then caught. The decoy pond at Dunsland is an Unscheduled Ancient Monument.
- Chestnut Avenue (SS 4075 0505): The grounds of Dunsland House are home to several 700 year old sweet chestnut trees.

== Sources ==
- Baring-Gould, Sabine (1908). "John Arscott, of Tetcott" . Devonshire Characters and Strange Events. London: John Lane The Bodley Head.
- Hoskins, W. G. (1972). A New Survey of England: Devon (New ed.). London: Collins. ISBN 0-7153-5577-5.
- Lauder, Rosemary (2005). "Dunsland". Vanished Houses of North Devon (revised ed.). Bideford: North Devon Books. pp. 29–38. ISBN 0-9528645-2-5.
- Risdon, Tristram (d.1640), Survey of Devon, 1811 edition, London, 1811, p. 250
- Vivian, Lt.Col. J.L., (Ed.) The Visitations of the County of Devon, Comprising the Heralds' Visitations of 1531, 1564 & 1620. 2 vols, Exeter, 1895.
