= Brandis Corner =

Village in Devon, England

Coordinates: 50.80°N 04.25°W

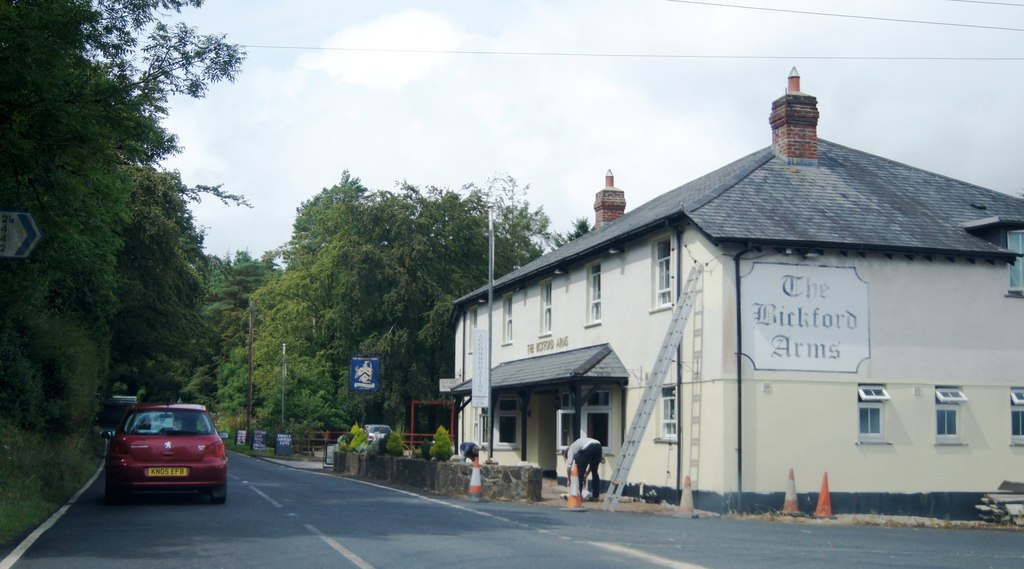
- A3072 at Brandis Corner

- Location within Devon
- OS grid reference: SS4103
- Shire county: Devon
- Region: South West
- Country: England
- Sovereign state: United Kingdom
- Police: Devon and Cornwall
- Fire: Devon and Somerset
- Ambulance: South Western

Brandis Corner is a hamlet on the A3072 within the civil parish of Holsworthy in Devon, England.

In the Cornish dialect, a brandis is a three-legged stool made of iron, or a three-cornered rest used for a kettle. In Devonshire, the name has been used for places shaped like this article, such as Brandis Corner and Brandis Lane near Crediton.
