= Clawton =

Village and civil parish in Devon, England

Coordinates: 50°46′N 4°20′W

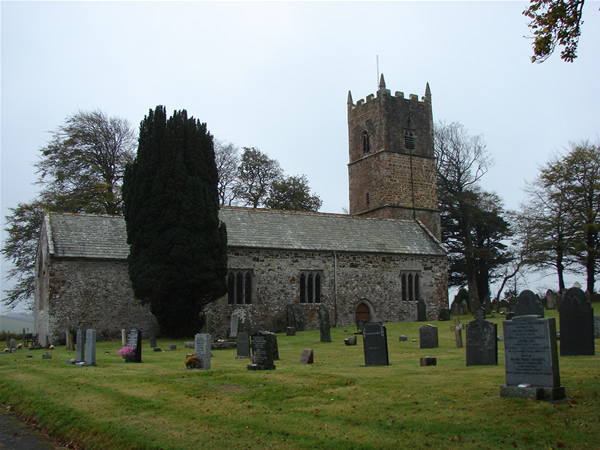
- St Leonard's church, Clawton

- Location within Devon
- Population: 326 (2001 census)
- Civil parish: Clawton
- District: Torridge
- Shire county: Devon
- Region: South West
- Country: England
- Sovereign state: United Kingdom

Clawton is a village and civil parish in the far west of Devon, England. It forms part of the local government district of Torridge. The village lies about three miles south of the town of Holsworthy on the A388 road. The parish is surrounded clockwise from the north-west by the parishes of Pyworthy, Holsworthy Hamlets, Ashwater, and Tetcott. Its western border follows the River Tamar which forms the county boundary with Cornwall. In 2001 its population was 326, slightly down from 389 in 1901.

The ancient parish church, dedicated to St Leonard, has some Norman features in one of its windows and it has a Norman font. Its tower and the arcades of the north and south aisles date from the 14th century and it has 15th-century arches of Polyphant stone. It was partly restored in 1873.

Blagdon a former manor house, is situated nearby. Other notable buildings in the parish are Gunnacott, which Pevsner says has unusually rich 17th-century carpentry for north Devon; and Eastcombe, which has a sundial on its front that is dated 1737 and bears an unusual inscription. (Note: The inscription reads: 'the time is shown at all hours of the day at Jerusalem and Barbados, whilst noon tide only is shown at Goa, Isfahan' (and ten other places).)
