= St Peter's and St Paul's Church, Holsworthy =

Church in Devon, England

Coordinates: 50.811°N 4.352°W

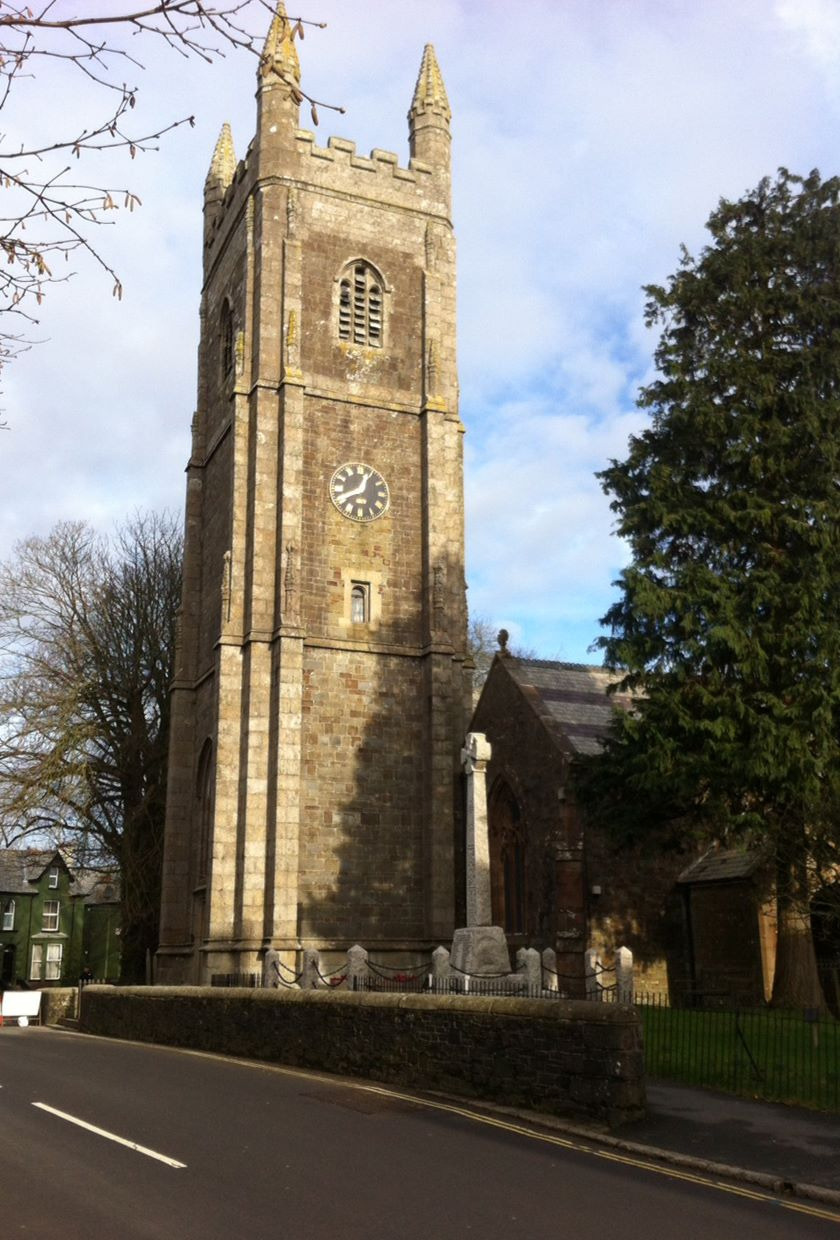
Church tower

St Peter's and St Paul's Church is a grade II* listed building and is the parish church of the small market town of Holsworthy, Devon, England. The present church, built in the early English style, dates from the mid-13th century. Renovations in the late 19th century included the complete rebuilding of the chancel, the addition of a north aisle and the renovation of the nave and south aisle. The 15th-century three-stage west tower is 85.75 feet (26.14 m) high and houses a set of eight bells and a carillon. The first building on the site was probably a Norman Oratory built c.1130 and demolished in c.1250. Remnants of the oratory have been incorporated into the south porch.

== History ==
The original Norman Church was small and occupied the site of the present nave. The oratory was demolished c.1250 and replaced by a church with tower, nave, south aisle and chancel built in the Early English style. Additions and alterations were made to the church in 1366.

In the 14th century Walter le Deneis (the Danish Man) founded a Chantry Chapel at Trewyn, about 0.5 miles (0.80 km) north of the Church. He endowed the priests of the chantry for two hundred years. The Deneis, or Dennis, family held the manors of Pancrasweek, Manworthy and Trewyn. The principal duty of a chantry priest was to say Mass daily for the souls of the founder family. The chantry was incorporated into the church in c.1450, probably in the South Aisle. The last appointment of a chantry priest was in 1524.

in 1881–82 the chancel (40 feet (12 m) long by 19 feet (5.8 m) wide) was completely rebuilt. In 1883 the nave, south aisle and porch were rebuilt and the north aisle, organ chamber and vestry were added. With the exception of the porch doorway, all the rebuilding was in the Early English style, the style which the original building showed most signs. Local stone was used for the main walls and Hatherleigh stone was used for the buttresses, quoins, dressings, copings, and window tracery. Internally, the window dressings and the arches of the north aisle are of Corsham Bath stone. The roofs of the nave and aisles are of pitch pine. The architect was Otho Bathurst Peter (1854-1937), of Launceston.

== Chancel ==
The floor is laid with encaustic tiles by Maw & Co. Externally it is higher than the nave. The oak wagon roof is panelled, with corbels carved with angels. Eighteen carved oak angels are mounted on stone brackets below the wall-plate.

The chancel is lit by four windows all c.1883. On the east wall the five-light window depicts the Ascension. On the north wall there are two two-light windows; one depicts the parable of the Good Samaritan and the other St Peter and St Paul. The lancet window on the south wall is of the Virgin Mary. This window was the gift of clergy of the Deanery and is by Mr Drake of Exeter. The other three windows are by Lavers and Westlake of London.

The chancel is divided from the organ chamber by a pointed arch on carved stone corbels. A similar arch divides the organ chamber from the south aisle.

The oak reredos, c.1926, was carved in 15th-century style by Herbert Read of Exeter. It was the gift of the children of Mrs Mary Elizabeth Aspinall, late of Waterloo House, Holsworthy, and is dedicated to her memory. The Reredos depicts St Peter and figures with shields that carry eight symbols of the Passion Story. They are 1. Hammer and Pliers; 2. Wounds of the heart, hands and feet; 3. Cloak and Dice; 4. Ladder sponge and spear; 5. Nails and crown of thorns; 6. Pillar and two scourges; 7. Bag of tribute money; and 8. Sword and Malchus's ear. It was painted and gilded in 1968.

== Nave and aisles ==
In the mid-20 century the north aisle was transformed into a Lady Chapel. The three-light window, c.1970, above the altar on the east wall, depicts the enthroned Virgin. The three-light litany window, c.1883, on the west wall has stained glass by Clayton and Bell of London. The aisle is also lit by three three-light windows, c.1883, on the north wall. The south aisle, 63 feet (19 m) long by 18 feet (5.5 m) wide, is lit by two three-light windows installed in 1883 and by a three-light window, c.1867, in memory of the Cory family. The nave, 66 feet (20 m) long by 20 feet (6.1 m) wide, is divided from the south aisle by an arcade of four equilateral pointed arches raised on massive octagonal piers that date from the fourteenth century. In 1883 the arches were raised by two feet. The nave is divided from the north aisle by a similar arcade of four arches, built in 1883. A glass partition, erected in 1973, separates the nave from the tower entrance. Remains of the rubble walls of the Norman Oratory are visible near the tower.

The carved oak pulpit was dedicated in June 1910 and was donated by Mrs Boutcher and Miss Ethel Mary Aspinall in memory of their brother, John Aspinall (1883–1904). The carving was by Miss Aspinall.

== Porch ==
The porch has a pointed arch opening, with rosettes to reveals, and a decorative ogee arch surround with blind niches. On the east wall there is a carved stone Holy water stoup. On the west wall there is a Norman capital of a colonnette above which is a carved stone panel depicting the Agnus Dei thought to be the centre of a tympanum. Two Norman colonnettes, with Romanesque capitals are incorporated into the wall on each side of the doorway. The doorway has a Norman style arch with zig-zag decoration that was added in 1883.

== Tower ==
The mid-15th century, three stage crenellated west tower is constructed of local stone and has four Crocketed Pinnacles. The granite setback buttresses are terminated by crockets. The west door of the tower is a Four-centred arch with hoodmould and label stops. The tower is 85.75 feet (26.14 m) high.

A spiral granite stairway provides access to the upper three levels of the tower. From the ringing floor the steps ascend to the clock room. A clock was first mentioned in the Churchwarden's accounts of 1690. The present clock was installed in 1869 and is by Gillett and Bland Steam Clock Factory, Croydon. A mechanism to chime the Westminster quarters was added in 1873. The clock used to be wound daily by hand by three separate movements; one each for the hours, minutes and the chimes. It is now electrically wound. The clock room also houses the electronic equipment of the carillon. From the clock room the steps lead to the belfry. In 1553 there were three bells and in 1727 there were five. in 1826 eight new bells, cast by Thomas Mears II of the Whitechapel Bell Foundry, were installed. Their size ranged from 26.5 inches (670 mm) to 42.5 inches (1,080 mm). In 1949 the bells were recast with increased weight. The inscriptions from the old bells were cast onto the new ones and all the bells have 'Gillett & Johnston Croydon 1949' inscribed on their top band. The bells were re-hung onto a new steel framework. At the same time a new carillon, also by Gillett & Johnston, was installed. The whole work was re-dedicated by Robert Mortimer (Bishop of Exeter).

Bell 5 'Given by the family of the late Rector, Owen Lewis Meyrick, consisting of two sons and four daughters, 1826.'
Bell 6 'The expense incurred by placing a set of eight Bells in this tower was defrayed by a Subscription, which was raised through the persevering exertions of Francis Thorne, and his Nephew Francis Thorne Honey, 1826.'
Bell 7 'E Dono Humphredi P. Davie, Baronetti, A.D. MDCCCXXVI.'
Bell 8 'The gift of Philip Henry Earl of Stanhope, 1826.'

From the belfry, the steps climb to a doorway about 4 feet (1.2 m) high that gives access to the roof.

== Organ ==
The organ is said to be by Renatus Harris and to have come from Chelsea Old Church (also known as All Saints). It was removed to Bideford in 1723 and brought to Holsworthy in 1865. Over the next two years it was restored and enlarged by the organ builders Geek and Sons of Launceston, Cornwall. The organ was rededicated on 20 June 1867. On 27 June 1867 the organ was opened by Mr W B Gilbert of London whom the Western Times described as "one of the best organists of the day". In 1883–84, during the church renovation, the organ was renovated by Hale and company, of Plymouth. In 1926 it was overhauled and reduced in size.
