= Honeychurch, Devon =

Village in Devon, England

Coordinates: 50.808424°N 3.947282°W

Honeychurch
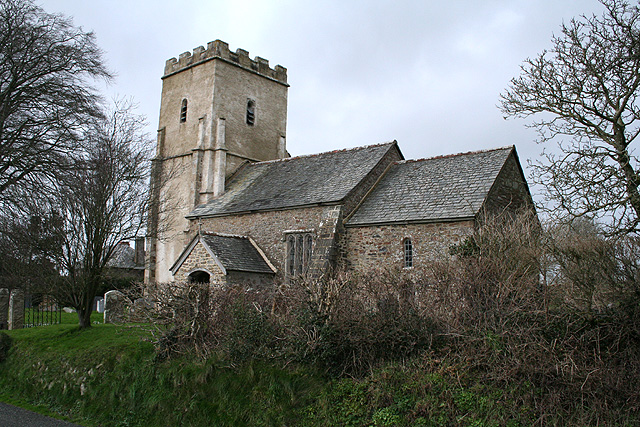
- Church of St Mary, Honeychurch

- Location within Devon
- OS grid reference: SS629028
- Civil parish: Sampford Courtenay
- District: West Devon
- Shire county: Devon
- Region: South West
- Country: England
- Sovereign state: United Kingdom
- Post town: North Tawton
- Postcode district: EX20
- Police: Devon and Cornwall
- Fire: Devon and Somerset
- Ambulance: South Western
- UK Parliament: England

Honeychurch is a village and former civil parish now in the parish of Sampford Courtenay, in the West Devon district of the English county of Devon. It was originally an ancient parish in the Black Torrington hundred of northwest Devon.

With about thirty inhabitants in 1066, the village is mentioned in the Domesday Book as "Honechercha". The description mentions five farms, which are still in operation in the 21st century. In 1870-72, John Marius Wilson's Imperial Gazetteer of England and Wales described Honeychurch in the following:

"HONEY-CHURCH, a parish in Okehampton district, Devon; near the river Taw, 2 miles WNW of North Tawton r. station, and 5½ ESE of Hatherleigh. Posttown, North Tawton, North Devon. Acres, 607. Real property, £497. Pop., 44. Houses, 9. The property is subdivided; and the manor belongs to the Earl of Portsmouth. The living is a rectory in the diocese of Exeter. Value, £93. Patron, the Rev. Dr. Brailsford. The church is old, and has a tower."

On 31 December 1894 the parish was abolished and merged with Sampford Courtenay. By 1894 there were only 8 houses. The parish had 66 inhabitants in 1801, 69 in 1848, 35 in 1891, and 44 in 1901.

The 12th-century church, dedicated to Mary, is largely in its original state, save for the addition of the 15th-century three-bell tower and 16th-century portico in the south facade. The name of the village refers to the previous building on this site, "Huna's church", founded in the 10th century by the Saxon landowner Huna.
