= Hollacombe =

Village and civil parish in Devon, England

Coordinates: 50°48′N 4°18′W

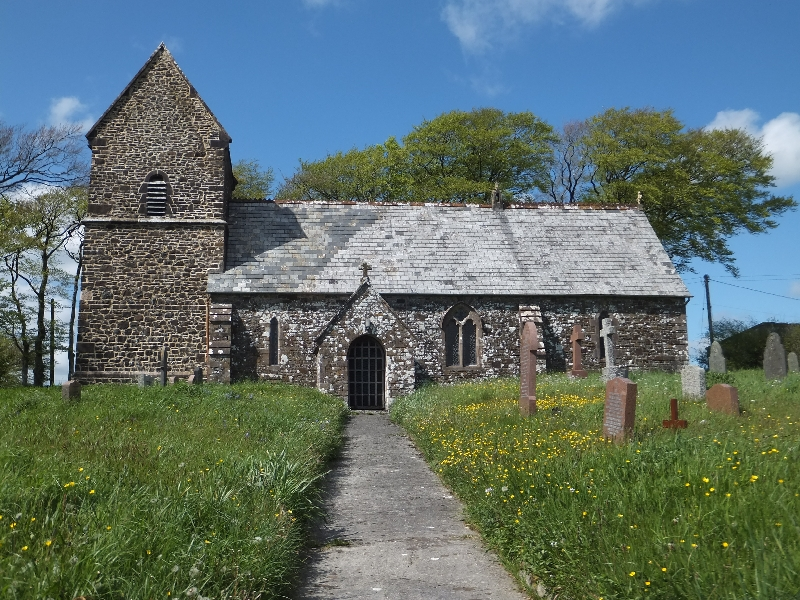
- Hollacombe Church

- Location within Devon
- Population: 59 (2001 census)
- Civil parish: Hollacombe
- District: Torridge
- Shire county: Devon
- Region: South West
- Country: England
- Sovereign state: United Kingdom

Hollacombe is a village and small civil parish in the local government district of Torridge, Devon, England. It lies about 3 miles southeast of the town of Holsworthy and is surrounded clockwise from the north by the parishes of Cookbury, Ashwater, and Holsworthy Hamlets. In 2001 its population was 59, compared to 69 in 1901.

The parish church, on a hilltop site, is dedicated to Saint Petroc and dates from the 14th century though it was subjected to heavy restoration in the 1880s. Its most notable feature is the saddleback roof to the tower, which is rare in Devon.
