= Thornbury, Devon =

Village and civil parish in Devon, England

Coordinates: 50.8537°N 4.2742°W

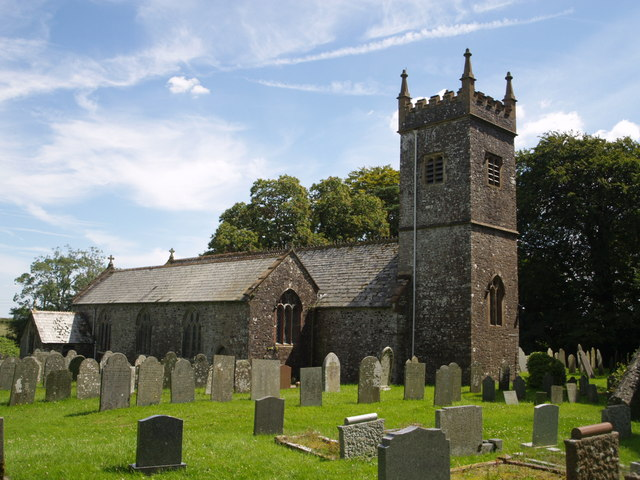
Thornbury parish church

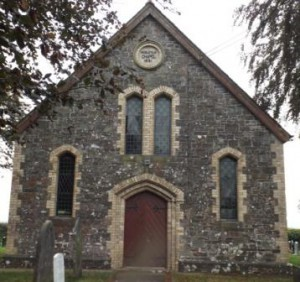
Woodacott Methodist Chapel

Thornbury is a small village and civil parish in the local government district of Torridge, Devon, England. The parish, which lies about five miles (8 km) north-east of the town of Holsworthy, comprises the five hamlets of Thornbury, Woodacott, Brendon, Lashbrook and South Wonford. These five hamlets are spread over an area of some 6 square miles (16 km^{2}), with a distance of three miles (5 km) from Brendon to Thornbury Church. Hence, the community is quite widespread, with the only focal point being the Green at Woodacott Cross. The parish is surrounded clockwise from the north by the parishes of Milton Damerel, Bradford, Cookbury and Holsworthy Hamlets. In 2011, its population was 290, in 120 households, little changed from the 291 residents it had in 1901.

The parish church, dedicated to St Peter, is in the hamlet of Thornbury and has a fine Norman south doorway dated to around 1150. Although most of the rest of the fabric dates to the early 14th century, it was partly hidden by a heavy restoration in 1876 during which the tower was also increased in height by five feet. In the churchyard there is an arch which used to lead to the village pound where stray animals were kept. In 2014 a group of volunteers photographed and transcribed all of the gravestones and inscriptions in and around both the Church and Chapel. The results are available here.

There is a Methodist Chapel at Woodacott, which was originally built in 1833, with the current building dating from 1891. It is now closed for worship.

The nearest primary school is in Bradford.

The village has its own website at www.thornburyhamlets.com and copies of the parish magazine, the "Thornbury Tatler" can be downloaded from the website.
