= Pancrasweek =

Hamlet and civil parish in Devon, England

Coordinates: 50.828°N 4.427°W

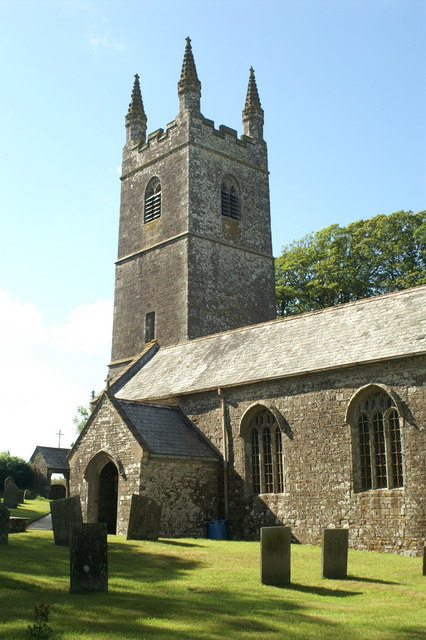
- Pancrasweek parish church

- Location within Devon
- Population: 217 (2001 census)
- Civil parish: Pancrasweek
- District: Torridge
- Shire county: Devon
- Region: South West
- Country: England
- Sovereign state: United Kingdom

Pancrasweek is a village and civil parish and hamlet in the far west of Devon, England forming part of the local government district of Torridge and lying about three miles north west of the town of Holsworthy.

It is bordered clockwise from the north by the Devon parishes of Bradworthy, Holsworthy Hamlets, a small part of Pyworthy, and Bridgerule. The parish consists of small scattered settlements with a population of 217 in 2001, down from 277 in 1901. It is bounded to the west by the River Tamar (in its upper course) which for much of its length delineates Cornwall's border with Devon; a small part of the parish of Pancrasweek (including the farms/hamlets of Hudson and Dexbeer) however extends across the river onto the west side.

The parish church, dedicated to Saint Pancras, stands alone on a hill in the south of the parish. Hoskins' Devon dates it to the 15th century with traces of Norman work in the walls of the nave, and says that its tower has fine crocketted pinnacles of the West Devon type. Pevsner states that the church was restored between 1894 and 1910 and that it has richly carved wagon roofs. At the hamlet of Lana about a mile north of the church is a Wesleyan chapel built in 1838, said by Pevsner to be the most attractive in Devon.

Part of the Lower Tamar Lake lies within the parish. This artificial lake was constructed in the 1820s to supply water to the Bude Canal, but it is now a haven for wildlife and is popular for coarse fishing.
