= Caroline Arscott =

British academic

Caroline Arscott is an emeritus professor of the history of art at the Courtauld Institute.

== Career ==
Arscott studied at Newnham College Cambridge and the University of Leeds.

She is an expert on art of the Victorian period and has lectured at The Courtauld since 1988.

From 2009 until 2014 she was Head of Research at The Courtauld with responsibility for the Research Forum programme of activities and for The Courtauld's research strategy and Research Excellence Framework submission.

She has published extensively on Edward Burne-Jones and William Morris, including the book Edward Burne-Jones and William Morris: Interlacings (2008).

Arscott was on the Oxford Art Journal editorial board from 1998 to 2008 and continues to serve as Advisory Editor. She was an editor of the RIHA Journal from 2009 to 2014.

== Selected publications ==
- "Edward Burne-Jones (1833–98)" in E. Prettejohn (ed.), The Cambridge Companion to the Pre-Raphaelites, Cambridge: Cambridge University Press, 2012.
- "Everyday Variety and Classical Constraint in Victorian Drawings" in Life, legend, landscape: Victorian drawings and watercolours edited by Joanna Selborne, exhibition catalogue, London: The Courtauld Gallery, 2011.
- Edward Burne-Jones and William Morris: Interlacings, Yale University Press, New Haven and London, 2008. ISBN 0300140932
- "William Powell Frith’s The Railway Station: Classification and the Crowd", in William Powell Frith, exhibition catalogue, London, Guildhall Art Gallery, November 2006, pp. 79–93.
- "Representations of the Victorian City" in M. Daunton, (ed.), Cambridge Urban History of Britain: Volume Three (1840–1950), Cambridge University Press, Cambridge, 2000, pp. 811–32.
- "Convict Labour: Masking and Interchangeability in Victorian Prison Scenes", Oxford Art Journal, vol. 23, no. 2, 2000, pp. 119–42 (on Frith).
