= Nicky Arscott =

British artist and poet (born 1983)

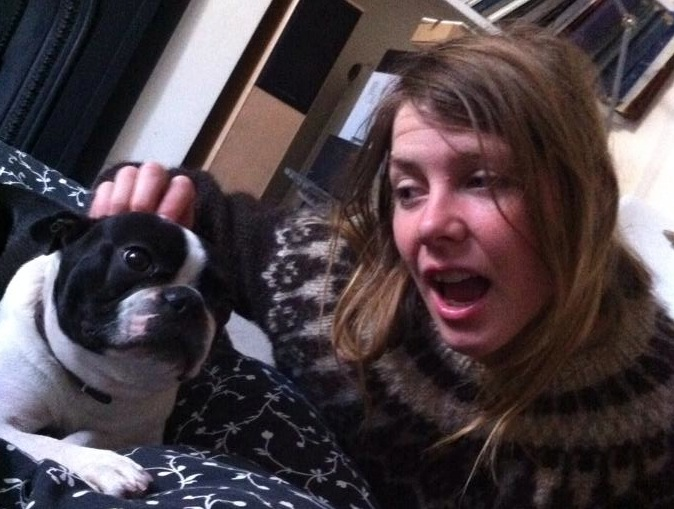
- Nicky Arscott
- Born: Nicky Arscott; 14 April 1983; Oxford, England
- Education: University of Bristol University of Texas at Austin
- Known for: art, poetry, poem comics

Nicky Arscott (born 1983) is a poet and artist who lives and works near Machynlleth, Powys, Wales.

== Early life and education ==
Nicky Arscott was born in Oxford in 1983 and grew up in Ledbury. She studied English literature at the University of Bristol (BA 2005) and creative writing at the University of Texas, Austin, US (MA 2008).

== Art ==
Arscott's work combines visual art and poetry, often taking the form of a 'poem comic'. Her poem comics have been published by Poetry Wales, New Welsh Review, and Bat City Review (USA).

Arscott has exhibited in Texas, Hereford and London, including at the Royal Academy Summer Exhibition, and was a winner at the Society of Women Artists’ 150th anniversary exhibition. She was artist in residence at Hay Festival in 2014.

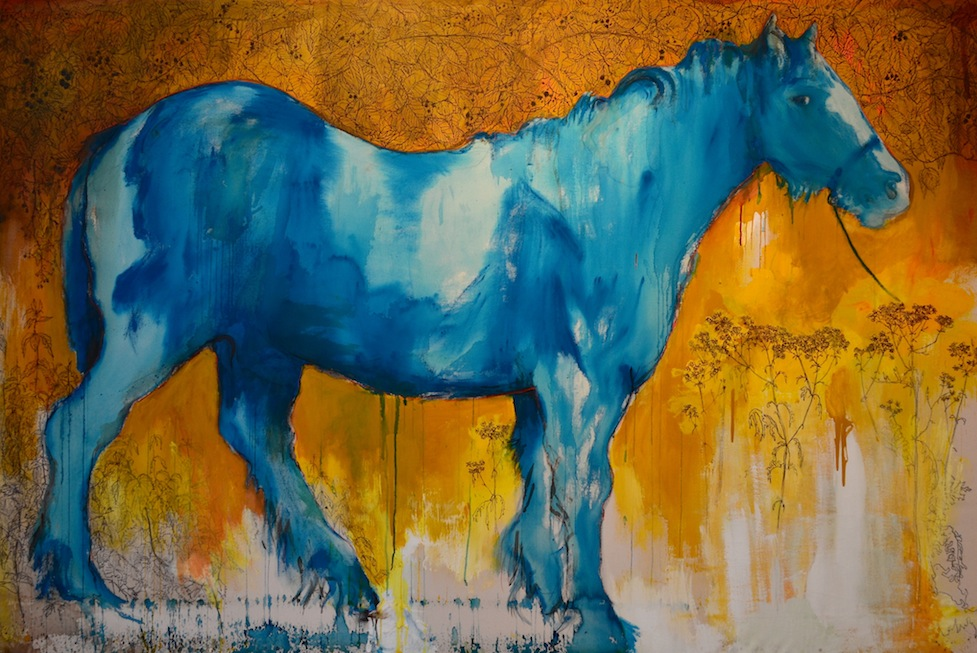
Blue Colt

== Poetry ==
Arscott's poetry has been published in Ambit, Mslexia, The North, The Rialto, and her pamphlet Soft Mutation was published by Rack Press in 2015. In 2013 she received a New Writers Bursay from Literature Wales.

In a review of Soft Mutation (978-0-9931045-1-0), Éadaoín Lynch writes of Arscott's 'preoccupation with womanhood and over-sexualised femininity, and their connection to detachment and death.' Alison Brackenbury writes that 'her use of the colloquial is easy and powerful. Her poems, with no layer of artifice, can shift frighteningly in their briefest of lines.'
