= Pyworthy =

Village in Devon, England

Coordinates: 50.8057°N 4.39407°W

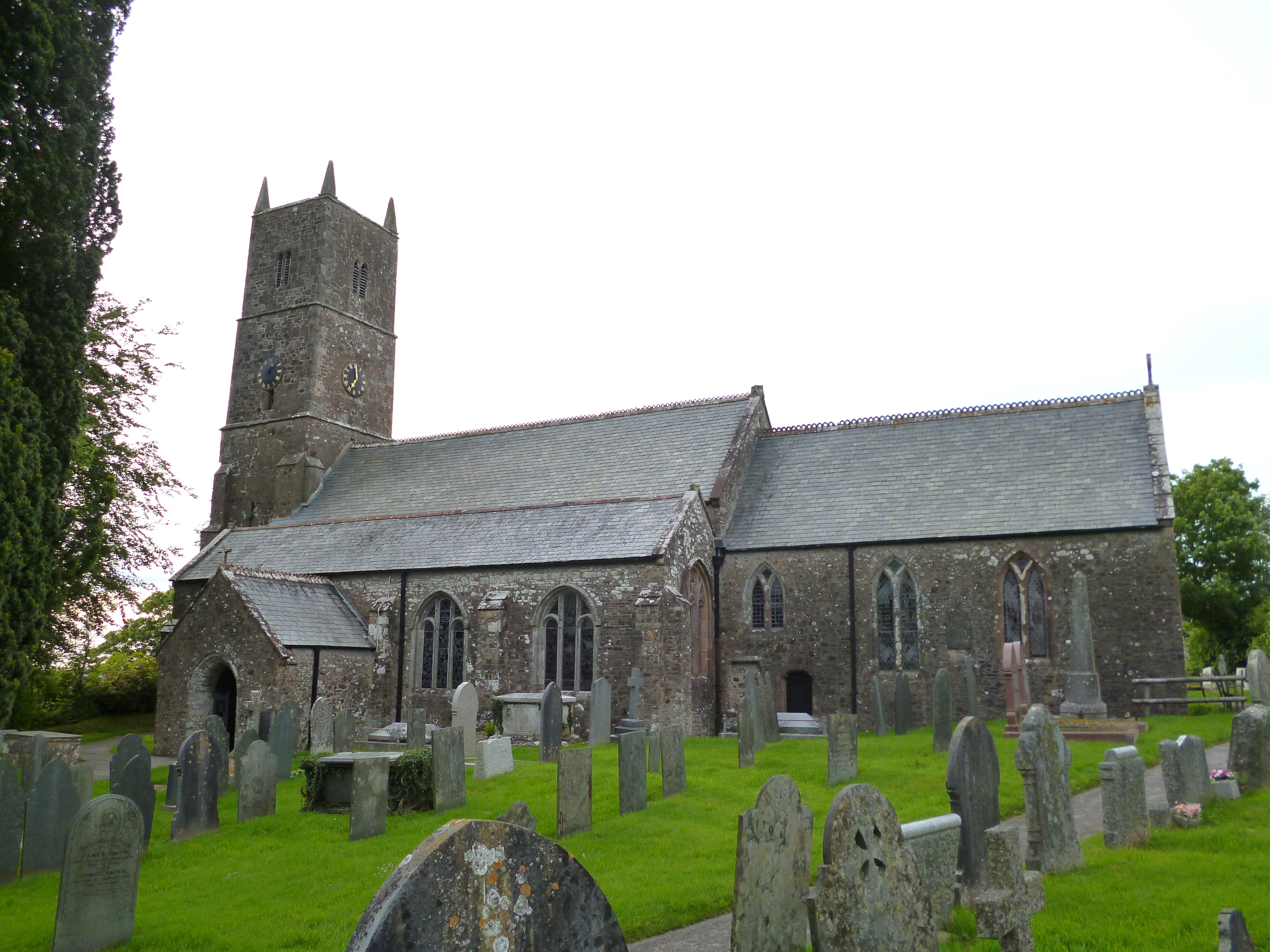
- St Swithins church

- Location within Devon
- Population: 689
- OS grid reference: SS313028
- District: Torridge
- Shire county: Devon
- Region: South West
- Country: England
- Sovereign state: United Kingdom
- Post town: Holsworthy
- Postcode district: EX22
- Dialling code: 01409
- Police: Devon and Cornwall
- Fire: Devon and Somerset
- Ambulance: South Western
- UK Parliament: Torridge and Tavistock

Pyworthy is a village and civil parish in the far west of Devon, England. It forms part of the local government district of Torridge. The parish lies to the west of the town of Holsworthy. It is surrounded clockwise from the north-west by the parishes of Bridgerule, a small part of Pancrasweek, Holsworthy Hamlets and Holsworthy, and Clawton. Its western border follows the River Tamar which forms the county boundary with Cornwall. In 2001 its population was 689, up from 429 in 1901.

The Old Rectory was formerly a sound recording studio.

== St. Swithin's Church ==
There is a 13th-century church dedicated to Saint Swithin in Pyworthy, and it is one of the few old Devon churches having a clerestory, the others being North Molton, South Molton, Cullompton, Tiverton and Poltimore.

== Notable residents ==
John Nettles (actor)
