= Broadwoodkelly =

Village in Devon, England

Coordinates: 50.8357°N 3.9660°W

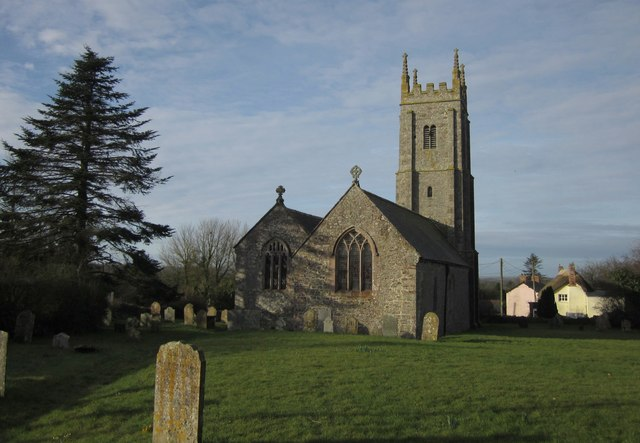
- Church of All Hallows

- Location within Devon
- Population: 218 (2001 census)
- Civil parish: Broadwoodkelly
- District: West Devon
- Shire county: Devon
- Region: South West
- Country: England
- Sovereign state: United Kingdom
- Police: Devon and Cornwall
- Fire: Devon and Somerset
- Ambulance: South Western

Broadwoodkelly is a village and civil parish in the West Devon district of Devon, England. According to the 2001 census it had a population of 218. The village is situated about 9 miles (14 km) north of Okehampton.

Much of the church is 15th century, but it has two 700 years old piscinae, an ancient granite baptismal font, an elizabethan table, and a stained-glass window dated 1523.
