= Highampton =

Village in Devon, England

Coordinates: 50.81667°N 4.15°W

- Location within Devon
- District: West Devon
- Shire county: Devon
- Region: South West
- Country: England
- Sovereign state: United Kingdom
- Post town: Beaworthy
- Postcode district: EX21
- Dialling code: 01409
- Police: Devon and Cornwall
- Fire: Devon and Somerset
- Ambulance: South Western
- UK Parliament: Central Devon

Highampton is a parish in Devon spread over approx. 4½ miles. It stands on a ridge with views of Dartmoor and Exmoor. Highampton is about 10 miles from Holsworthy, 9 miles from Okehampton and 3½ miles from Hatherleigh. The A3072 runs through Highampton.

== History ==
Highampton was recorded in the Domesday Book in 1086. The Lord in 1086 was Roger of Meulles with Highampton valued at £3.

=== The Manor of Burdon ===
The Manor of Burdon is an Ancient Manor dating back to Anglo-Saxon times. It is thought to be one of the oldest manors in Devon. The Manor was known as Buredune at the time of William the Conqueror's Domesday Book of 1086 and was later held by Lucya de Buredone in 1241 for one-tenth of a Knight's fee.

The current owner of the Burdon Manor house is Andrew Orchard, and the building is now used as a residential home for those with disabilities.

== Buildings and Facilities ==
The village has a Primary School, an outreach Post Office visits the village hall, a Pub, a Gin Distillery, a Church, and a Village Hall in which many classes, e.g. dance, are run. There is also a Local History Society.

The church, dedicated to the Holy Cross, is grade II* listed. The font and the south door are 12th-century and the tower is 15th-century, but it was largely rebuilt in 1834 and restored in 1876.

== Gallery ==
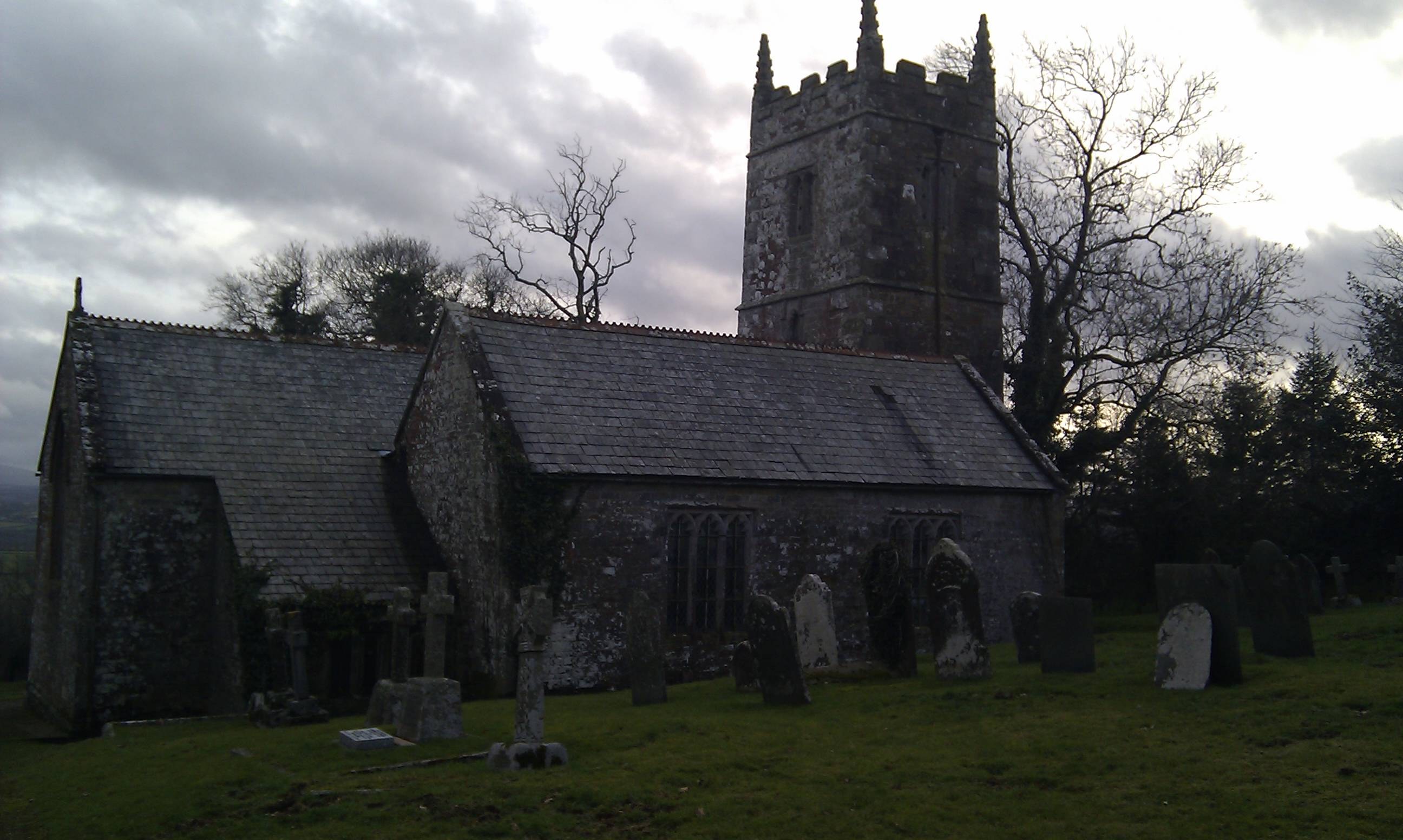
Highampton Church

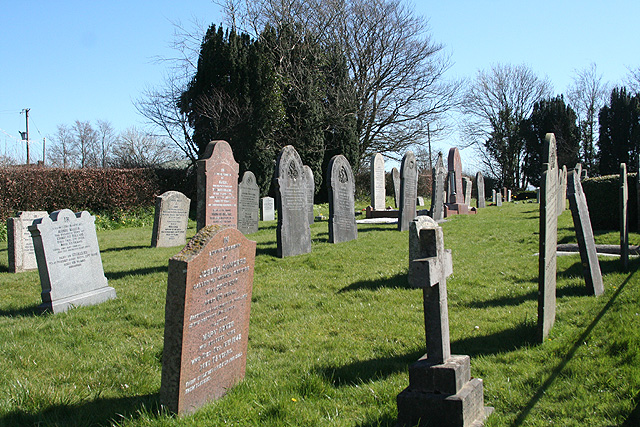
Chapel Graveyard
