= Beaworthy =

Village in Devon, England

Coordinates: 50.7667°N 4.1833°W

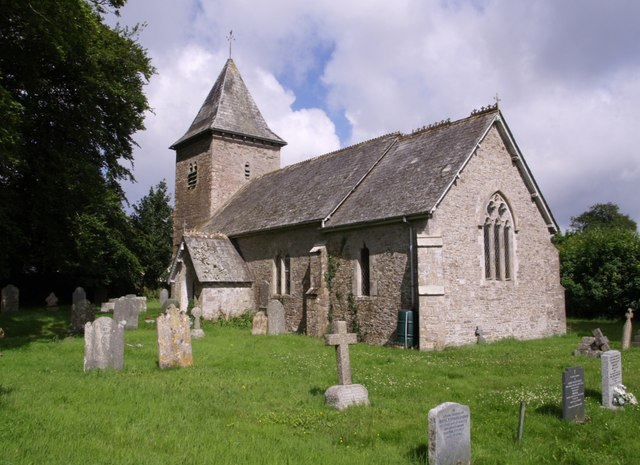
- St Alban's church, Beaworthy

- Location within Devon
- Population: 236 (2001 census)
- OS grid reference: SX4605198677
- District: West Devon
- Shire county: Devon
- Region: South West
- Country: England
- Sovereign state: United Kingdom
- Post town: BEAWORTHY
- Postcode district: EX21
- Dialling code: 01409
- Police: Devon and Cornwall
- Fire: Devon and Somerset
- Ambulance: South Western
- UK Parliament: Torridge and Tavistock

Beaworthy is a village and civil parish in the West Devon district of Devon, England. According to the 2001 census it had a population of 236.

== Notable residents ==
- Henry Courtney Selous (b. Haymarket, London, 1803; d. Beaworthy, Devon, 24 September 1890), was an English artist, painter, illustrator and lithographer.
