= Black Torrington =

Village in mid Devon, England

Coordinates: 50°49′N 4°11′W

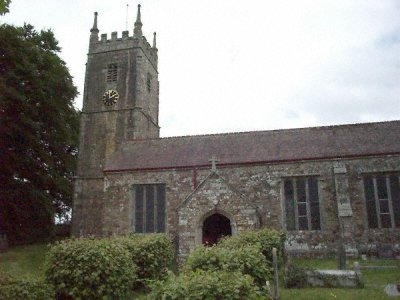
St Mary's Church, Black Torrington

Black Torrington is a village and civil parish in Torridge, Devon, England, situated between the towns of Holsworthy and Hatherleigh. It is located on and named after (the dark waters of) the River Torridge. In the 2021 UK census, the population of Black Torrington was recorded as having been 528.

In the Domesday Book of 1066 it had a recorded population of 67 households, which put it in the largest 20% of English settlements at the time.

Buildings in the village include the grade II* listed Church of St Mary, a 15th-century Church of England parish church, and the grade II listed Coham, an 18th-century country house.

== See also ==
- Black Torrington Hundred
