= Ashwater =

Village in Devon, England

Coordinates: 50.73°N 04.29°W

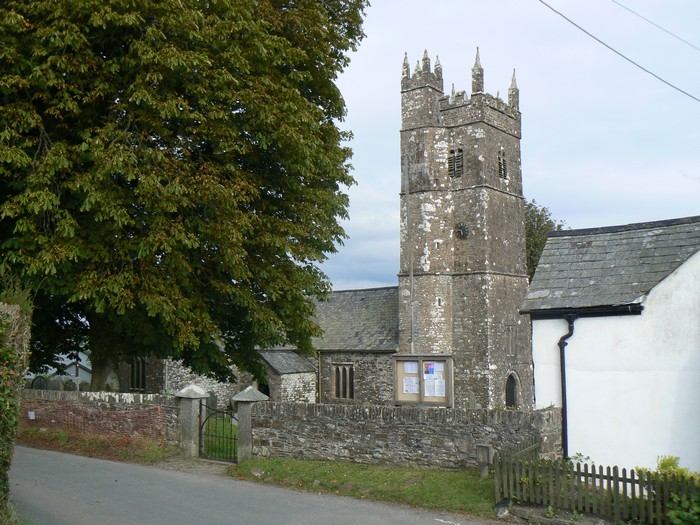
- St Peter's church

- Location within Devon
- OS grid reference: SX3895
- District: Torridge
- Shire county: Devon
- Region: South West
- Country: England
- Sovereign state: United Kingdom
- Post town: BEAWORTHY
- Postcode district: EX21
- Dialling code: 01409
- Police: Devon and Cornwall
- Fire: Devon and Somerset
- Ambulance: South Western
- UK Parliament: Torridge and Tavistock

Ashwater is a village and civil parish in the Torridge district of Devon, England. According to the 2001 census it had a population of 651 that had risen to 673 by the 2011 census. It is close to the Cornish border, and is about 10 miles north of Launceston.

The church is thirteenth century, with fifteenth-century windows, with an arcade that mixes the two periods. The decorated font is Norman, described by Mee as "a great treasure". The former rectory is a Grade II listed building.

"ASHWATER, a parish in the hundred of BLACK-TORRINGTON, county of DEVON, 6 miles (S.E. by S.) from Holsworthy, containing 774 inhabitants. The living is a rectory, in the archdeaconry of Totness, and diocese of Exeter, rated in the king's books at £26. 6. 8. The Rev. T. Melhuish was patron in 1823. The church, dedicated to St. Peter, contains some interesting monuments. Fairs for cattle are held here on the first Tuesday in May, and the first Monday after the lst of August. Freestone of excellent quality is obtained in the vicinity."

— A Topographical Dictionary of England, Samuel Lewis, 1831
