= Holsworthy =

Town in Devon, England

Coordinates: 50.8167°N 4.35°W

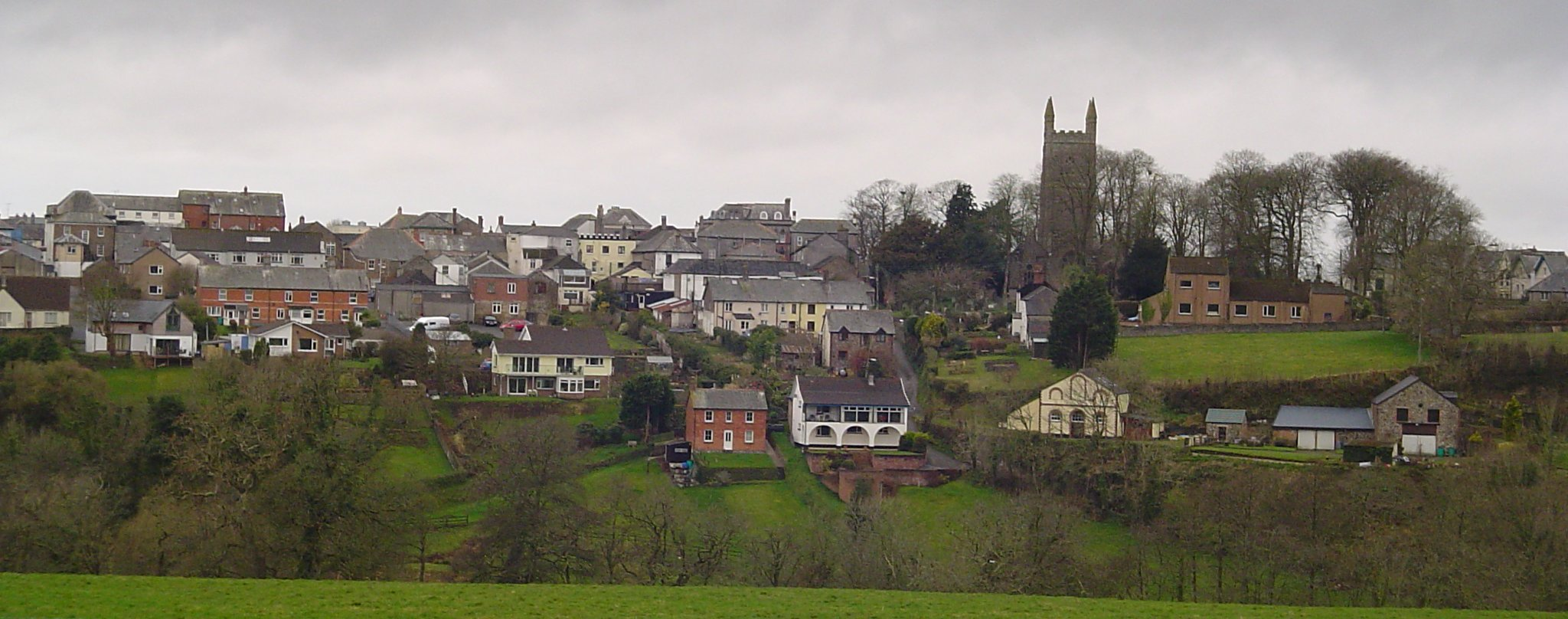
- Town View

- Location within Devon
- Population: 3,475 (2021 Census)
- Civil parish: Holsworthy
- District: Torridge
- Shire county: Devon
- Region: South West
- Country: England
- Sovereign state: United Kingdom
- Post town: HOLSWORTHY
- Postcode district: EX22
- Dialling code: 01409
- Police: Devon and Cornwall
- Fire: Devon and Somerset
- Ambulance: South Western
- UK Parliament: Torridge and Tavistock

Holsworthy is a market town and civil parish in the Torridge district of Devon, England, 36 miles (58 km) west of Exeter. The River Deer, a tributary of the River Tamar, forms the western boundary of the parish, which includes the village of Brandis Corner. It had a population of 3,475 at the 2021 census, which was previously estimated at 3,287 in 2019.

== History ==
=== Toponymy ===
The original meaning of "Holsworthy" is probably "Heald's enclosure". Derived from the Old English personal name "Heald" or "Healda", plus "-worthig", an enclosure, farm or estate. An alternative possibility is from Old English "heald" meaning incline or slope. In 1086 the name was recorded as Haldeword and as Haldeurdi (Exon). Other recorded spellings are Haldwwurth 1228, Halleswrthia -worth(e) -wordi (late 12th–1291), Haldeswrthy -wrthi -worth (1277–1389), Holdesworthe (1308), Healdesworthe (c. 1320), Hyallesworthi (1326), and Houlsworthy (1675).

=== Manorial history ===
Holsworthy is recorded in the Domesday Book of 1086 as Haldeword. It was part of the Hundred of Black Torrington.

In 1066 the lord of the manor was Earl Harold and in 1066 it was William I. It was given by Henry II to Fulk Paganell. He gave it, with his daughter Gundred, to Matthew del Jartye. Their daughter and heiress brought it to Chaworth. Henry de Tracey purchased it from Chaworth, and it descended to the baronial family of Martyn. From them it passed by marriage to the lords Audley, and by an entail to the crown. King Edward III granted it to his son, John of Gaunt, 1st Duke of Lancaster. John Holland, Duke of Exeter, possessed it by a grant from the Crown, and in 1487 the manor was given for life to Margaret, Countess of Richmond. In 1621 Sir John Speccot (d. 1645) of Speccot in the parish of Merton, Devon, Sheriff of Cornwall in 1622, was lord of the manor. After that it was purchased by the Prideaux family of Soldon, Holsworthy. In about 1713, the manor of Holsworthy was sold by Prideaux to Thomas Pitt, 1st Earl of Londonderry, from whom it descended to Earl Stanhope. In 1932 Holsworthy Urban District Council purchased the manorial rights from Lord Stanhope and so became lords of the manor.

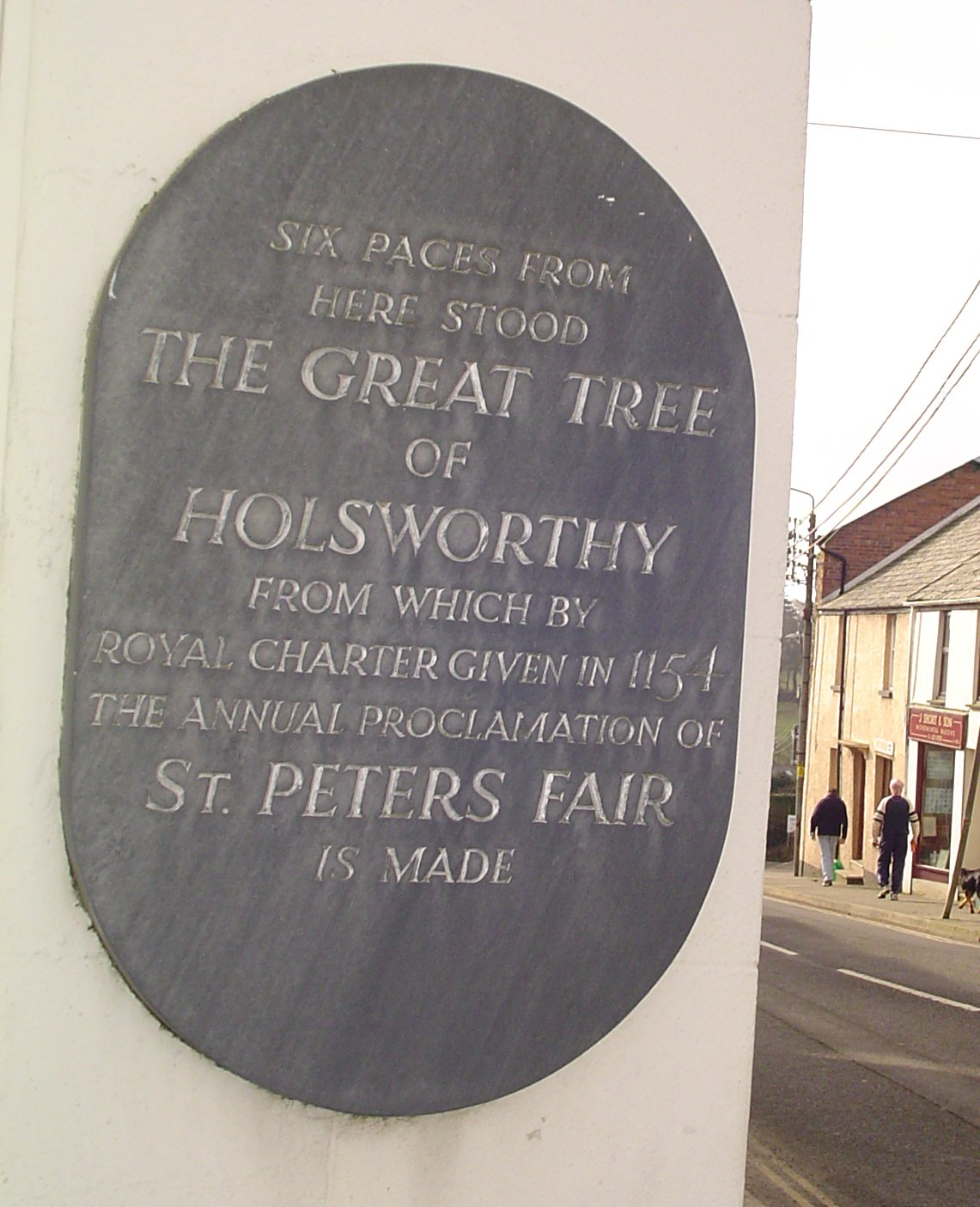
Great Tree Plaque

Holsworthy was part the Hundred of Black Torrington. In 1614 King James I granted a charter for an annual fair to be held in Holsworthy. During the English Civil War Holsworthy was held by Royalists forces until, on 17 February 1646, Sir Thomas Fairfax, after his victory at Torrington, sent a party to take possession of the town.

In the Second World War, Prisoner of War Camp No. 42 (Exhibition Field Camp) lay north of the town, near to what is now Park Close. German and Italian prisoners held there were employed as farm labourers.

The historic estate of Soldon, Holsworthy, was long a seat of a branch of the Prideaux family.

== Governance ==
The earliest form of governance recorded for Holsworthy is that of a Court Leet. A charter, dated 1154, granted a "Chartered Court Leet of the Ancient Manor of Holsworthy". The court leet was one of the highest and oldest tribunals of English common law and was presided over by the Portreeve. The office of Portreeve had existed since Saxon times, when he served as governor of the town. The court was held periodically, normally annually, and attended by the residents of the district. It had jurisdiction over petty offences and the civil affairs of the district, and performed a number of administrative functions, such as collecting tolls and dues paid by traders and later military levies. The "Port" in Portreeve refers to a market town, a place of harbourage of goods, not of ships, and the "reeve" part indicates the chief magistrate of the town. The powers and duties of the Portreeve and Court Leet ceased when the statutory bodies of Petty Sessions (Magistrates Courts) and Parish Councils were created, to deal with criminal and civil matters, respectively.

On 1 April 1900 Holsworthy parish was split by the creation of Holsworthy Hamlets parish, consisting of the whole parish except for Holsworthy town. The two new councils were Holsworthy Urban District Council for Holsworthy parish and Holsworthy Rural District Council for Holsworthy Hamlets. These with others were merged on 1 April 1974 under the Local Government Act 1972 as a new Torridge district. Holsworthy Town Council with 12 councillors is chaired by a mayor elected annually by the councillors. It covers local services such as maintaining the town's footpaths, parks, gardens and war memorial, and running the weekly Pannier Market and annual Holsworthy in Bloom contest.

== Geography ==
Holsworthy is in the west of the Torridge district of Devon. Neighbouring parishes are, to the west Pyworthy, and Holsworthy Hamlets in other directions. Holsworthy is 190 miles (310 km) from London and 36 miles (58 km) from Exeter, on the intersection of the A388 and A3072 roads. The town centre is about 140 metres (460 ft) above sea level. The highest point in the parish is 144 metres (472 ft). The river Deer, a tributary of the river Tamar, forms the western parish boundary.

The bedrock geology of the parish is entirely of Bude Formation. This type of Sedimentary bedrock formed in the Carboniferous period. All of the parish is of Bude Formation (sandstone) except for a strip of Bude Formation (mudstone and siltstone), about 1,600 feet (490 m) wide, across the extreme north. The Bude Formation forms part of the Holsworthy Group.

== Demography ==
The population of Holsworthy, according to the census of 1801, was 1,045. There was a steady growth to 1,857 in 1841. Over the next 60 years it fell overall to 1,371 in 1901, but over the following sixty years it rose gradually to 1,748 in 1971, dipped to 1,645 in 1981, then to 2,641 in 2011, which was an increase of 60.54 per cent in thirty years, and then rapidly grew to 3,475 in 2021, which was a notable increase from ten years ago.

Population of Holsworthy
Year	1801	1811	1821	1831	1841	1851	1861	1871	1881	1891
Population	1,045	1,206	1,440	1,628	1,857	1,833	1,724	1,645	1,716	1,960
Year	1901	1911	1921	1931	1939	1951	1961	1971	1981	1991
Population	1,371	1,499	1,416	1,403	1,355	1,550	1,618	1,748	1,645	1,892
Year	2001	2011	2021							
Population	2,256	2,641	3,475							

Data for 1801–1991 is from Britain Through Time, data for 2001–2021 from the Office of National Statistics.

== Economy ==
Holsworthy has one of the largest livestock markets in South West England, held on the same site from 1905 until 2014, when the site was sold for retail and residential development and the livestock market moved out of town.

Holsworthy is home to the only centralised anaerobic digestion facility in the UK. Turning dairy farm slurry into biogas, the plant has an installed capacity of 2.1 MW. There are proposals to provide low-cost heat to the householders of the town from the plant.

The town is part of the Ruby Country of 45 parishes around the market towns of Holsworthy and Hatherleigh. These two were at the centre of the 2001 Foot and Mouth Disease outbreak. Although agriculture was directly affected, local businesses suffered considerable hardship. In response the Ruby Country Initiative was formed as a non-profit partnership to further a more robust, sustainable local economy and create an area identity.

== Culture and community ==
=== Culture ===
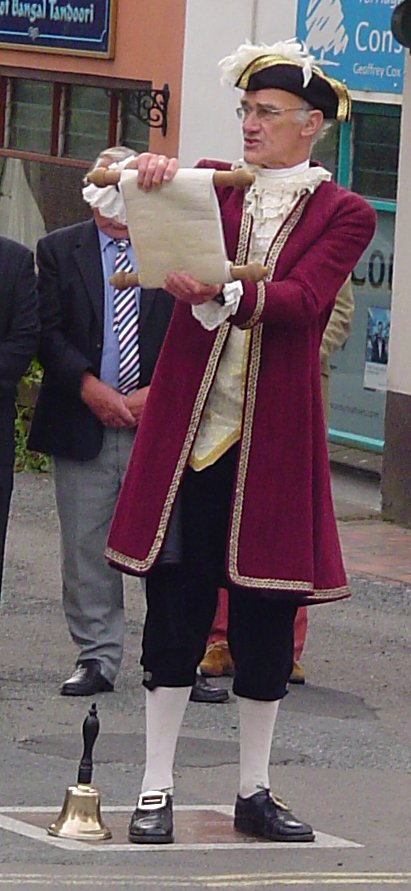
Proclamation of the fair charter by the Town crier

St Peter's Fair is held on four days in July. Since the shift from the Gregorian calendar in 1752, the fair has been held eleven days after the feast day of St Peter (29 June). On the first day, the 1614 charter granting a fair by King James I is proclaimed by the town crier on the spot where the Great Tree of Holsworthy stood in Stanhope Square. A brass plaque in the road marks the site of the tree.

The annual presentation of the "Pretty Maid" is made at noon on the first day of St Peter's Fair. Her identity is kept secret until she emerges through the church tower doorway to be greeted by the crowd of viewers. This results from a legacy made in the will of the Reverend Thomas Meyrick, of Carta Martha, near Launceston, who died 27 May 1841. His brother, the Reverend Owen Lewis Meyrick, was Rector of Holsworthy from 1766 to his death in 1819. Under the terms of the will, the legacy was to be invested to pay a dividend of £3 10s on 5 July annually to the churchwarden of Holsworthy. £2 10s of the dividend to be paid to a young single woman under the age of 30 and "generally esteemed by the young as the most deserving, the most handsome, most noted for her qualities and attendance at church." The balance of £1 was to be paid to a spinster, not under 60 years of age, of the same qualities.

The annual one-day Holsworthy and Stratton Agricultural Show is a major event for the town and the local farming community. It began in 1883 as the Holsworthy and Stratton Agricultural Exhibition with the venue alternating between Stratton and Holsworthy. After the Second World War, a permanent site was bought north of Stanhope Park and became known as the Show Field. The show was held in May as the first in Devon's agricultural show season. It is now held at Killatree Cross, 1.2 miles (1.9 km) west of Holsworthy, on the third Thursday in August.

A half-marathon Ruby Run is held in June between the towns of Hatherleigh and Holsworthy. The starting point alternates between them. It attracts competitors from all over the South West. The first race was run on 15 June 2003 from Hatherleigh to Holsworthy.

Holsworthy Vintage Vehicle and Engine Rally dating from 1987 has become a two-day event that attracts exhibitors and visitors from a wide area. It is held on the last Saturday and Sunday of June.

The annual November Carnival began in November 1900 to replace the Guy Fawkes and bonfire celebration.

Holsworthy is twinned with Aunay-sur-Odon in the Calvados department in the Lower Normandy region of north-west France. Aunay-Sur-Odon is 8 kilometres (5.0 mi) south of Villers-Bocage, 30 kilometres (19 mi) south-west of Caen, and 31 kilometres (19 mi) north-east of Vire. The two visit each other's towns in alternate years.

=== Community ===
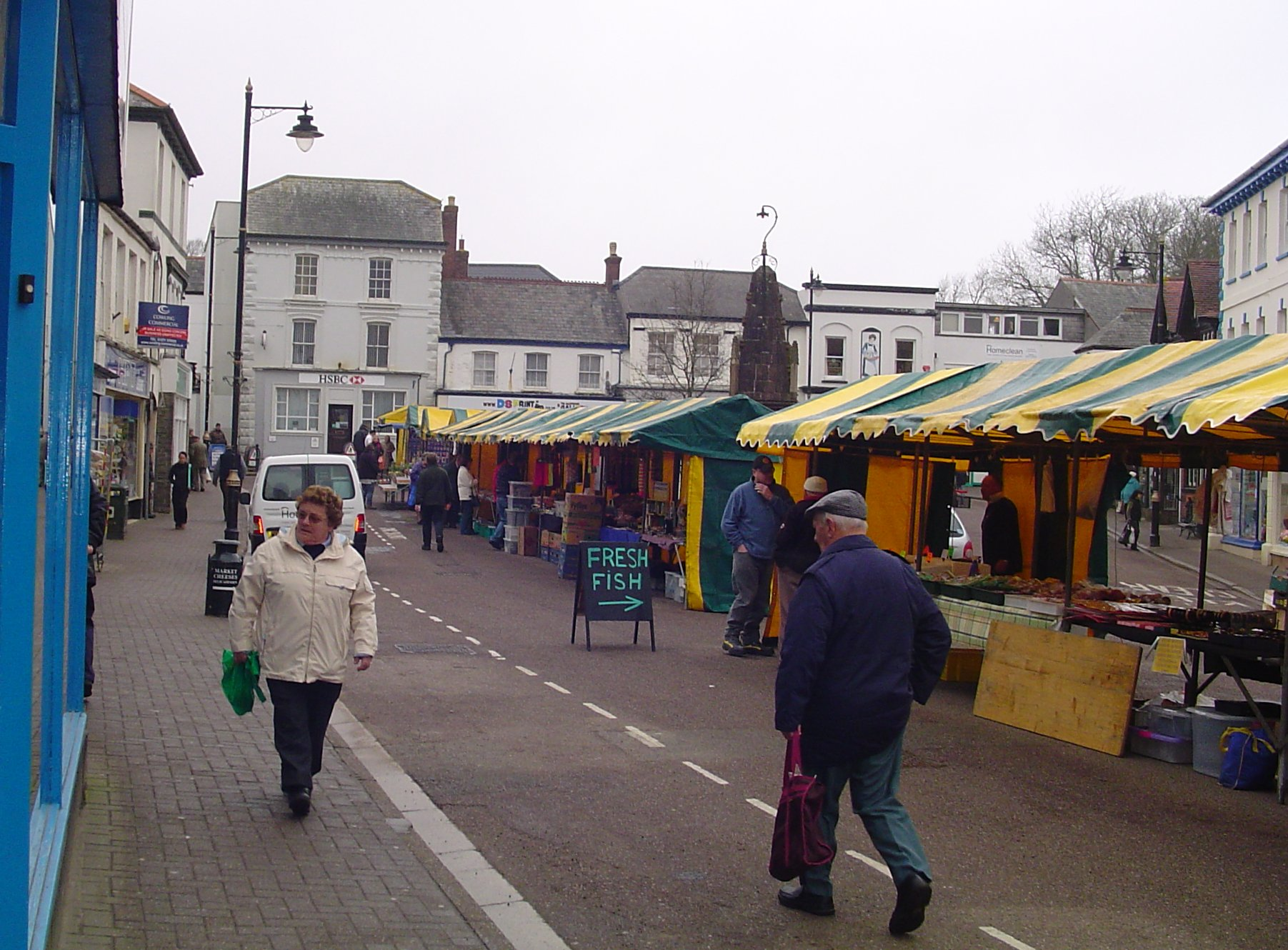
View of the market

In the centre of the town square stands a stone Market Cross symbolising the right to trade. The cross that originally sat on the top of the structure broke off decades ago and has been replaced by an ornate lamp.

Holsworthy Community Hospital, in Dobles Lane to the north of the town, was built in 1991. It is run by the Northern Devon Healthcare NHS Trust. It has one in-patient ward and an out-patient department. Nearby is Holsworthy Medical Centre, which serves Holsworthy and surrounding villages. A "minor-injury" service is provided during surgery hours. In December 2014, building started of The Long House, an outreach centre of North Devon Hospice in the grounds of the Medical Centre, to provide patients care and support close to home.

The 8 acres (3.2 ha) of Stanhope Park were donated by James Stanhope, 7th Earl Stanhope. It houses the town's cricket and bowling clubs. Since 2012 it has been protected as recreational space in perpetuity by Fields in Trust under the Queen Elizabeth ll Fields Challenge. In 2014 a play park was opened. It is used by Holsworthy Primary School and Holsworthy College for sport and educational purposes.

Holsworthy Library is in North Road, opposite the parish church.

== Religious sites ==
=== Anglican church ===
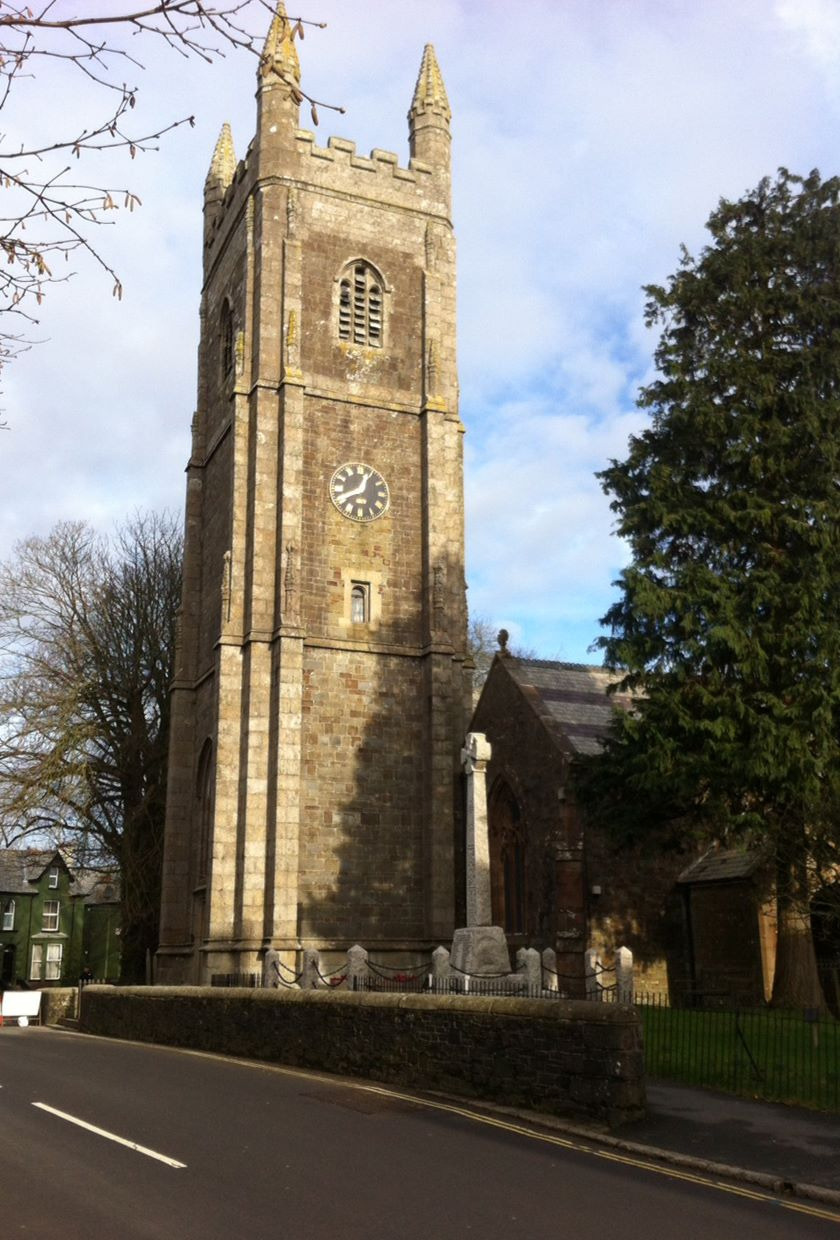
The west tower of Holsworthy Church

The parish church of St Peter's and St Paul's is a Grade II* listed building. The first building on the site was probably a Norman Oratory from about 1130, replaced in about 1250 by a church with tower, nave, south aisle and chancel built in the Early English style. The original Norman Church occupied the site of the present nave.

Renovations in the late 19th century included a complete rebuilding of the chancel, addition of a north aisle and repairs to the nave and south aisle. The 15th-century, three-stage west tower houses a peal of eight bells and a carillon. It is 85.75 feet (26.14 m) high.

The south porch contains remnants of the original Norman building. On the east wall there is a carved stone holy water stoup and on the west wall a carved stone panel depicting the Agnus Dei, thought to be the centre of a tympanum above a Norman capital of a colonnette. Two Norman colonnettes with Romanesque capitals are built into the wall on each side of the doorway.

The church contains several stained-glass windows, including three by Lavers, Barraud and Westlake of London.

The organ is said to be by Renatus Harris and have come from Chelsea Old Church (All Saints). It was moved to Bideford in 1723 and then to Holsworthy in 1865. Over the next two years it was enlarged by the organ builders Geek and Sons of Launceston, Cornwall. It was inaugurated on 27 June 1867 by W. B. Gilbert of London, whom the Western Times called as "one of the best organists of the day".

The church is one of few in the country to depict the Devil in stained glass. It also gained fame from Samuel Sebastian Wesley's music, Holsworthy Church Bells – composed for the chiming drum. A legend states that the tower was built on top of a live human sacrifice to ensure a strong foundation.

=== Methodist church ===
The Methodist Church in Bodmin Street opened on 28 April 1910 as the United Methodist Church.

A Grade II listed building, it was built in 1909–1910 in Early English style by two local firms, Samuel Parsons (also the architect) and William F. Glover. The church, on the site of an earlier chapel of about 1876, retains its appearance, but adds a two-stage octagonal crenelated tower with a spire and a two-light window at its base.

The gabled façade is of Bath stone with Plymouth limestone dressings. The gable ends carry crocketed finials. The arch over the double doors of the gabled porch is inscribed "United Methodist Church 1910". The porch, with a two-light window above, is flanked by two-light windows under continuous hood moulds. The church and hall have shallow raking buttresses and slate roofs with decorative ridge tiles. The interior takes the form of a four-bay apsidal basilica, with a serpentine-curve gallery over the entrance. The gallery has pierced decorative wooden panels and rests on cast-iron columns with decorative capitals. The five-bay hammerbeam, ceiled and boarded roof has pierced braces, green marble corbels and metal ties. Four roof trusses converge at the apsial end. The organ, with stencilled pipes, dates from 1887 and was later enlarged. It is flanked by two stained-glass windows said to have been removed from the Wesleyan chapel in Chapel Street. Other windows carry pastel-coloured glass in Art Nouveau style. Internal fittings include a pitch pine pulpit, communion table and benches. The interior is rendered and the internal doors are part-glazed with coloured glass. The gable-fronted hall has a two-light window over a gabled porch flanked by two-light windows.

=== Catholic church ===
There was a Catholic church, St Cuthbert Mayne Chapel of Ease, at Derriton, Holsworthy. Since its closure in December 2005, the Catholic community has celebrated Mass at Holsworthy parish church.

== World War Two ==
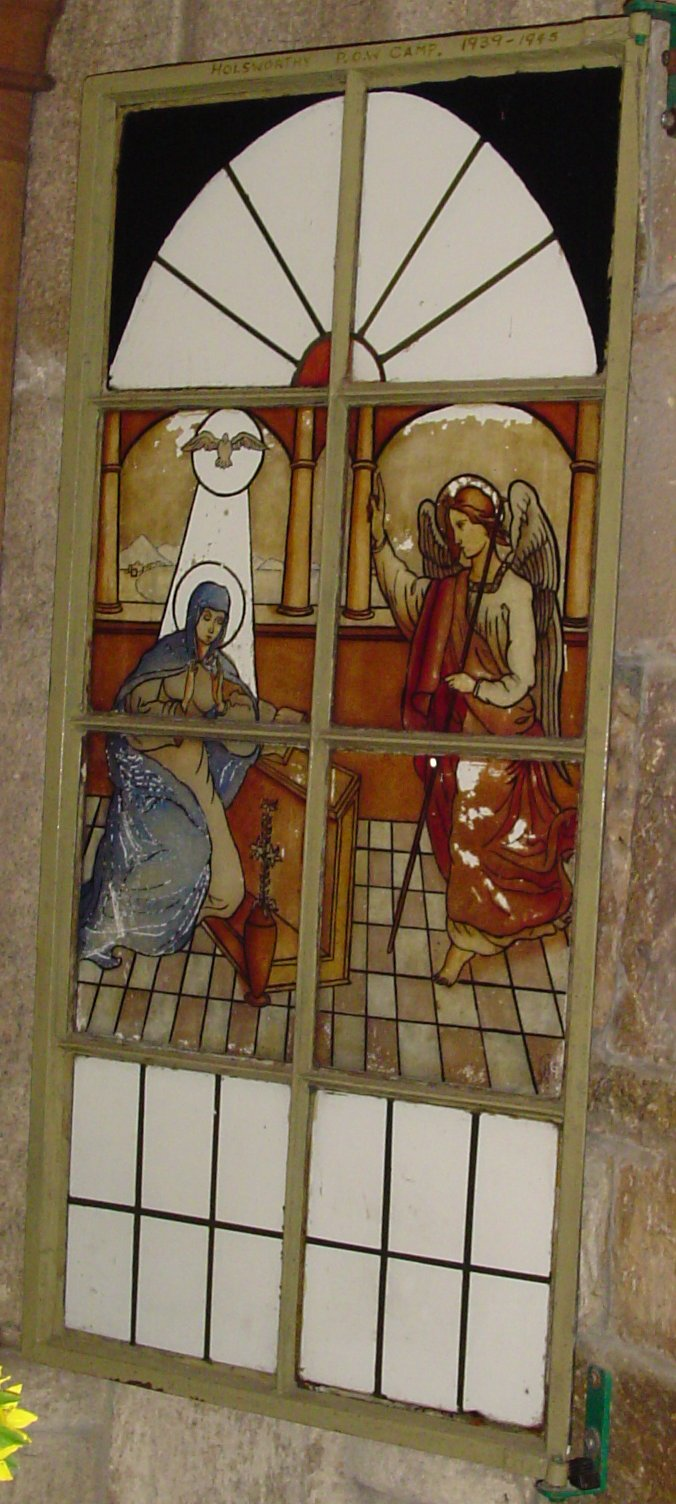
View of church window

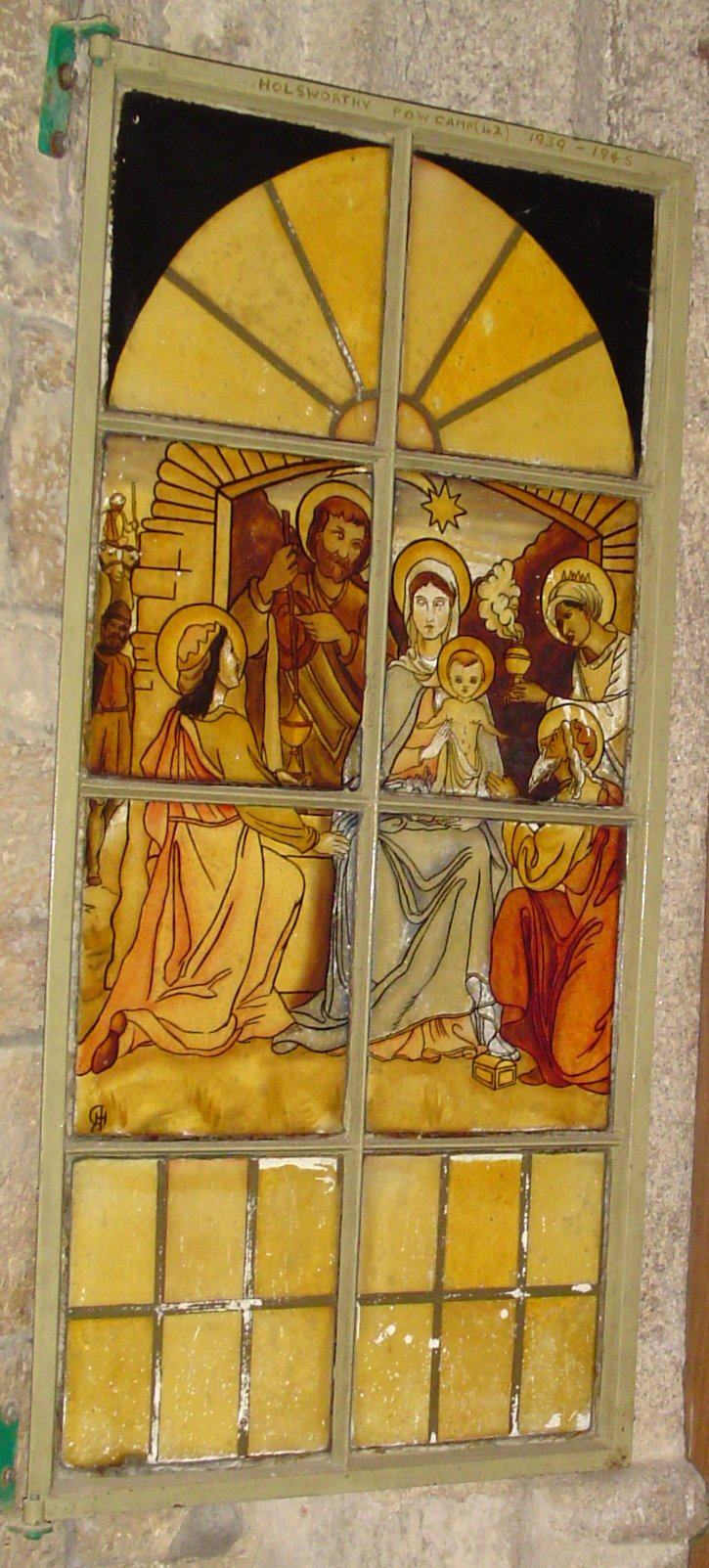
View of church window

During World War II, POW Camp No. 42 (Exhibition Field Camp) stood at what is now Stanhope Close. The Church of St Peter now displays a crucifix carved by a German prisoner of war and two hand-painted stained-glass windows made by Italian prisoners of war, from a hut that served as their Roman Catholic chapel.

== Education ==
Schools in the town include Holsworthy Community College and Holsworthy CE Primary School.

== Media ==
Local TV coverage is provided by BBC South West and ITV West Country. Television signals are received from either the Caradon Hill or Huntshaw Cross TV transmitters.

Local radio stations are BBC Radio Devon on 103.4 FM, BBC Radio Cornwall can also be received in the town on 95.2 FM, Radio Exe Devon on DAB, Heart West on 105.1 FM, and NCB Radio, a DAB station.

The town is served by the local newspaper, Holsworthy Post which publishes on Thursdays.

== Sport and leisure ==
Holsworthy has a non-League football club Holsworthy A.F.C. that plays at Upcott Field.

Holsworthy Cricket Club dates back to 1873.

== Transport ==
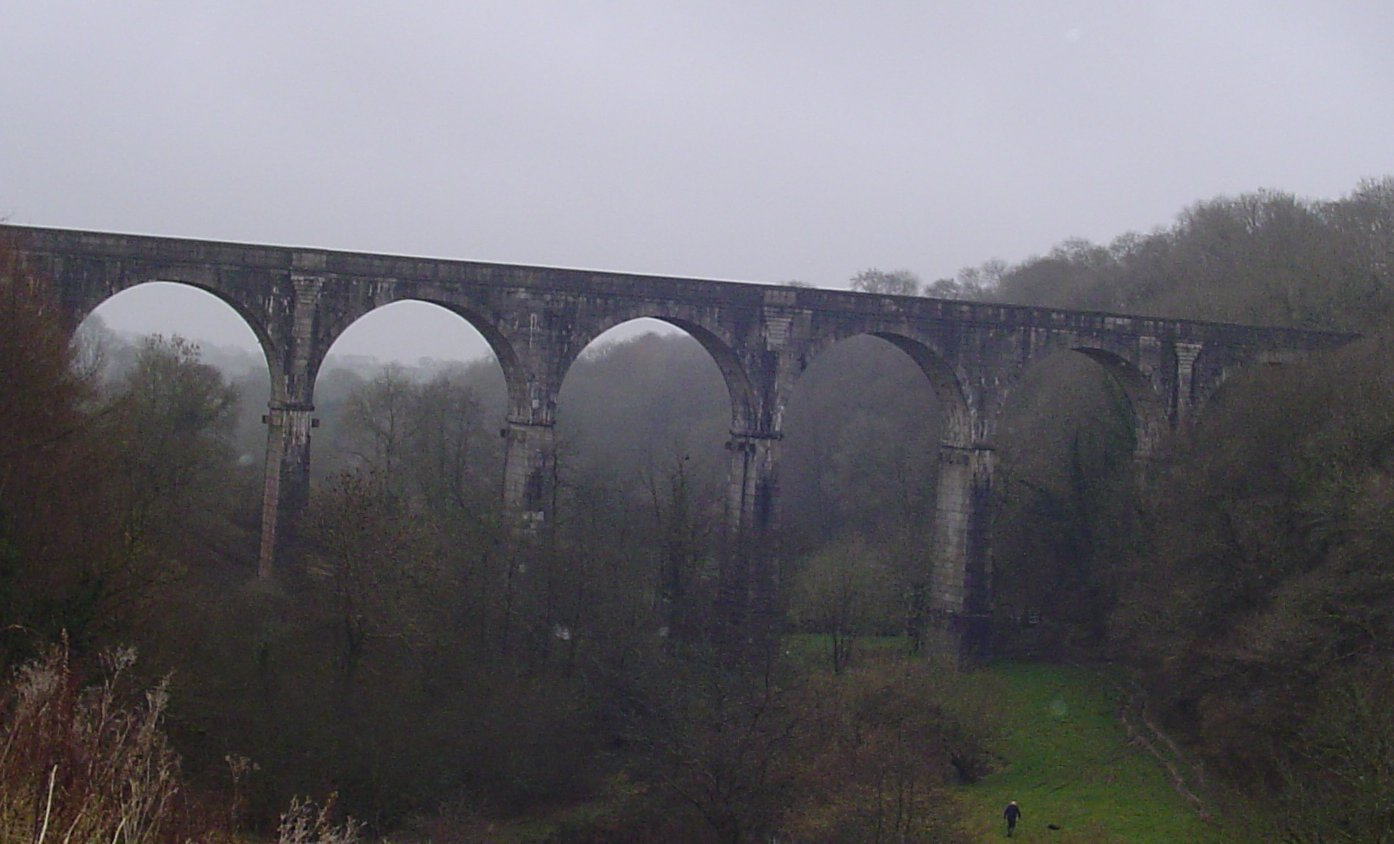
Derriton Viaduct

Holsworthy is served by a number of bus routes:

- 6 – Exeter to Bude (Stagecoach)
- 85 – Tavistock to Barnstaple (Stagecoach)
- 71 – Holsworthy to Barnstaple (only serves Holsworthy on one journey each way, Stagecoach)
- 217 – Holsworthy to Bude (Go Cornwall Bus)
- A number of one-day-a-week services (Carmel)

The railway arrived in 1879 and was operated by the Devon and Cornwall Railway Company. Holsworthy railway station closed in 1966, but the viaducts on either side of Holsworthy remain.

== Notable people ==
People of Holsworthy are known as Holsworthians. In birth order:

- Benedictus Marwood Kelly (1785–1867), 19th-century Royal Navy Admiral born in Holsworthy, was a director of the Devon and Cornwall Railway Co.
- Robert Newton Flew (1886–1962), Methodist theologian and religious writer, born in Holsworthy
- Barbara Mandell (1920–1998) became in 1955 Britain's first female newsreader on a national TV network and wrote travel books. She retired to Holsworthy and died there on 25 August 1998.

== Twin towns – sister cities ==
Holsworthy is twinned with:

- Les Monts d'Aunay, France, since 1974
