= List of churches in Mid Devon =

The following is a list of churches in Mid Devon, England.

== Active churches ==
There are churches in every civil parish. The district has an estimated 113 churches for 79,800 people, a ratio of one church to every 706 inhabitants.

Name	Civil parish (settlement)	Web	Dedication	Founded	Denomination	Benefice	Notes
St Michael & All Angels, Bampton	Bampton		Michael & Angels	Medieval	Church of England	Hukeley MC	
St Petrock, Petton	Bampton (Petton)		Petroc		Church of England	Hukeley MC	
Petton Methodist Church	Bampton (Petton)				Methodist	Tiverton & Wellington Circuit	
St Mary the Virgin, Bickleigh	Bickleigh		Mary		Church of England	Cadeleigh etc.	
St Bartholomew, Bow	Bow		Bartholomew	Medieval	Church of England	North Creedy Team?	Built by William de Tracy as penance for murdering Thomas Becket
Bow Congregational Church	Bow			1821	Cong Federation		
St Disen, Bradninch	Bradninch		Disen	Medieval	Church of England		Unusual dedication. Originally dedicated to St Denis
Bradninch Baptist Church	Bradninch			1813	Baptist Union		Current building 1832
St Mary the Virgin, Brushford	Brushford		Mary	Medieval	Church of England	Ashreigney, Winkleigh etc.	
St Mary the Virgin, Burlescombe	Burlescombe		Mary	Medieval	Church of England	Sampford Peverell MC	
Westleigh United Reformed Church	Burlescombe (Westleigh)				URC		
St Matthew, Butterleigh	Butterleigh		Matthew	Medieval	Church of England		
St Michael & All Angels, Cadbury	Cadbury		Michael & Angels	Medieval	Church of England	Netherexe Parishes	
St Bartholomew, Cadeleigh	Cadeleigh		Bartholomew	Medieval	Church of England	Cadeleigh etc.	
St James, Chawleigh	Chawleigh		James	Medieval	Church of England	Little Dart MC	
St Mary, Cheriton Bishop	Cheriton Bishop		Mary	Medieval	Church of England	Tedburn St Mary etc.	
St Matthew, Cheriton Fitzpaine	Cheriton Fitzpaine		Matthew	Medieval	Church of England	North Creedy Team	
Cheriton Fitzpaine Methodist Church	Cheriton Fitzpaine				Methodist	Exeter, Coast & Country Circ	
Upham Methodist Church	Cheriton Fitzpaine (Upham)				Methodist	Tiverton & Wellington Circuit	
St Petrock, Clannaborough	Clannaborough		Petroc	Medieval	Church of England	North Creedy Team	
St Peter, Clayhanger	Clayhanger		Peter	Medieval	Church of England	Hukeley MC	
St Andrew, Clayhidon	Clayhidon		Andrew	Medieval	Church of England	Upper Culm Valley MC	
St Matthew, Coldridge	Coldridge		Matthew	Medieval	Church of England	North Creedy Team	
St Andrew, Colebrooke	Colebrooke		Andrew		Church of England	North Creedy Team?	
St Boniface, Knowle	Copplestone (Knowle)		Boniface		Church of England		Proprietary chapel
Holy Cross Collegiate Church, Crediton	Crediton		Cross & Mary	Ancient	Church of England	Crediton	Full ded. "Holy Cross & the Mother of Him who Hung Thereon"
St Lawrence, Crediton	Crediton		Lawrence	Medieval?	Church of England	Crediton	Proprietary chapel
St Boniface, Crediton	Crediton		Boniface		Roman Catholic		
Crediton Methodist Church	Crediton				Methodist	Exeter, Coast & Country Circ	
Crediton Congregational Church	Crediton			1757	Cong Federation		
St Luke's Chapel, Posbury	Crediton Hamlets (Posbury)		Luke	1835	Church of England	Crediton	Proprietary chapel
Holy Trinity, Yeoford	Crediton Hamlets (Yeoford)		Trinity	1891	Church of England	Crediton	
Holy Cross, Cruwys Morchard	Cruwys Morchard		Cross	Medieval	Church of England	Exe Valley MC	
Nomansland Congregational Church	Cruwys Morc. (Nomansland)			1864	Cong Federation		
Pennymoor Congregational Church	Cruwys Morc. (Pennymoor)				Cong Federation		
Way Village Congregational Church	Cruwys Morc. (Way Village)			1847	Cong Federation		
St Andrew, Cullompton	Cullompton		Andrew	Medieval	Church of England		
St Boniface, Cullompton	Cullompton		Boniface	1929	Roman Catholic	Tiverton & Cullompton	
Cullompton Baptist Church	Cullompton			C17th	Baptist Union		
All Saints, Culmstock	Culmstock		All Saints	Medieval	Church of England	Upper Culm Valley MC	
Culmstock Methodist Church	Culmstock				Methodist	Tiverton & Wellington Circuit	Building erected 1888
St Mary the Virgin, Down St Mary	Down St Mary		Mary	Medieval	Church of England	North Creedy Team	
All Saints, Eggesford	Eggesford		All Saints	Medieval	Church of England	Little Dart MC	
St Andrew, Halberton	Halberton		Andrew	Medieval	Church of England	Sampford Peverell MC	
Ash Thomas Chapel	Halberton (Ash Thomas)				Church of England	Sampford Peverell MC	
Halberton Methodist Church	Halberton				Methodist	Tiverton & Wellington Circuit	
St Mary, Hemyock	Hemyock		Mary	Medieval	Church of England	Upper Culm Valley MC	
St Mary's Chapel, Culm Davy	Hemyock (Culm Davy)		Mary	Medieval	Church of England	Upper Culm Valley MC	
Hemyock Baptist Church	Hemyock			C19th	Baptist Union		Building opened 1865
St Andrew, Hittisleigh	Hittisleigh		Andrew	Medieval	Church of England	Whiddon MC	
SS Simon & Jude, Hockworthy	Hockworthy		Simon & Jude	Medieval	Church of England	Sampford Peverell MC	
All Saints, Holcombe Rogus	Holcombe Rogus		All Saints	Medieval	Church of England	Sampford Peverell MC	
All Saints, Huntsham	Huntsham		All Saints	Medieval	Church of England	Hukeley MC	
St John the Baptist, Kennerleigh	Kennerleigh		John the Baptist	Medieval	Church of England	North Creedy Team	
St Mary, Kentisbeare	Kentisbeare		Mary	Medieval	Church of England	Culm Valley MC	
Sainthill Baptist Church	Kentisbeare (Sainthill)				Baptist Union		
St Thomas of Canterbury, Lapford	Lapford		Thomas Becket	Medieval	Church of England	North Creedy Team	
Lapford Congregational Church	Lapford			1838	Cong Federation		
St Michael & All Angels, Loxbeare	Loxbeare		Michael & Angels		Church of England	Exe Valley MC	Member of GAFCON
St Mary the Virgin, Calverleigh	Loxbeare (Calverleigh)		Mary	Medieval	Church of England	Exe Valley MC	
St Mary, Morchard Bishop	Morchard Bishop		Mary	Medieval	Church of England	North Creedy Team	
Morchard Bishop Methodist Church	Morchard Bishop				Methodist	Ringsash Circuit	
St George, Morebath	Morebath		George	Medieval	Church of England	Hukeley MC	
SS Cyr & Julitta, Newton St Cyres	Newton St Cyres		Cyricus & Julitta	Medieval	Church of England	Netherexe Parishes	
St Bartholomew, Nymet Rowland	Nymet Rowland		Bartholomew	Medieval	Church of England	North Creedy Team	
St Peter, Oakford	Oakford		Peter	Medieval	Church of England	Exe Valley MC	
St Michael & All Angels, Poughill	Poughill		Michael & Angels	Medieval	Church of England	North Creedy Team	
St Thomas a Becket, Puddington	Puddington		Thomas Becket	Medieval	Church of England	North Creedy Team	
St John the Baptist, Sampford Peverell	Sampford Peverell		John the Baptist	Medieval	Church of England	Sampford Peverell MC	
Sampford Peverell Methodist Church	Sampford Peverell				Methodist	Tiverton & Wellington Circuit	
St Swithun, Sandford	Sandford		Swithun	Medieval	Church of England	Crediton	
Beacon Church, New Buildings	Sandford (New Buildings)			1875	Church of England	Crediton	Until 1981 this was also a school with services in school room
Sandford Congregational Church	Sandford			1847	Cong Federation		
St Swithun, Shobrooke	Shobrooke		Swithun	Medieval	Church of England	Crediton	
St Mary the Virgin, Silverton	Silverton		Mary	Medieval	Church of England	Cadeleigh etc.	
Silverton Evangelical Church	Silverton			1930s	Baptist Union		
Silverton Methodist Church	Silverton				Methodist	Exeter, Coast & Country Circ	Building erected 1914
St Mary the Virgin, Stockleigh English	Stockleigh English		Mary	Medieval	Church of England	North Creedy Team	
St Mary the Virgin, Stockleigh Pomeroy	Stockleigh Pomeroy		Mary	Medieval	Church of England	North Creedy Team	
St Margaret, Stoodleigh	Stoodleigh		Margaret the Virgin	Medieval	Church of England	Exe Valley MC	
St Margaret, Templeton	Templeton		Margaret the Virgin	Medieval	Church of England	Exe Valley MC	
St David, Thelbridge	Thelbridge		David of Wales	Medieval	Church of England	Little Dart MC	Rebuilt 1872–1875
St Thomas of Canterbury, Thorverton	Thorverton		Thomas Becket	Medieval	Church of England	Netherexe Parishes	
Thorverton Baptist Church	Thorverton				Baptist Union		
St Peter, Tiverton	Tiverton		Peter	Medieval	Church of England	Tiverton St P & Chevithorne	
St George, Tiverton	Tiverton		George	1714–1733	Church of England	Tiverton SS George & Paul	
St Paul, Tiverton	Tiverton		Paul	1850s	Church of England	Tiverton SS George & Paul	
St Andrew, Tiverton	Tiverton		Andrew	1959	Church of England		Current building 1971
St Thomas, Chevithorne	Tiverton (Chevithorne)		Thomas	1843	Church of England	Tiverton St P & Chevithorne	
St Catherine, Withleigh	Tiverton (Withleigh)		Catherine of Alex.	1847	Church of England	Exe Valley MC	Medieval chapel of ease previously on site. Parish from 1886
St James, Tiverton	Tiverton		James	1967	Roman Catholic	Tiverton & Cullompton	In process of building a new building
Tiverton Baptist Church	Tiverton			1607	Baptist Union		
Tiverton United Church	Tiverton				Methodist / URC	Tiverton & Wellington Circuit	Building dates from 1814
Tiverton Salvation Army	Tiverton				Quakers		
Tiverton New Apostolic Church	Tiverton				New Apostolic		
Tiverton Vineyard Church	Tiverton			2011	Vineyard		Planted from Taunton Vineyard
King Street Chapel, Tiverton	Tiverton			pre-1915	Partnership UK		
Cherith Christian Fellowship	Tiverton		Chorath		Independent		
St Mary the Virgin, Uffculme	Uffculme		Mary	Medieval	Church of England	Culm Valley MC	
St Stephen, Ashill	Uffculme (Ashill)		Stephen	1882	Church of England	Culm Valley MC	
All Saints, Bradfield	Uffculme (Bradfield)		All Saints	1875	Church of England	Culm Valley MC	Chapel of Bradfield House. Services held monthly
Uffculme Baptist Church	Uffculme				Baptist Union		
Uffculme United Reformed Church	Uffculme			C17th	URC		First building 1720, rebuilt 1860s
St Peter, Uplowman	Uplowman		Peter	Medieval	Church of England	Sampford Peverell MC	
St Mary the Virgin, Upton Hellions	Upton Hellions		Mary	Medieval	Church of England	Crediton	
St Mary the Virgin, Washfield	Washfield		Mary	Medieval	Church of England	Exe Valley MC	
St Peter, Washford Pyne	Washford Pyne		Peter	Medieval	Church of England	North Creedy Team	
Hele Lane Methodist Church	Washford Pyne (Black Dog)				Methodist	Ringsash Circuit	
St Michael & All Angels, Wembworthy	Wembworthy		Michael & Angels	1503	Church of England	Little Dart MC	
St Mary the Virgin, Willand	Willand		Mary	Medieval	Church of England	Culm Valley MC	
Culm Valley Methodist Church	Willand				Methodist	Tiverton & Wellington Circuit	Willand & Cullompton Methodist churches merged 2007
St Mary, Woolfardisworthy	Woolfardisworthy		Mary	Medieval	Church of England	North Creedy Team	
St Peter, Zeal Monachorum	Zeal Monachorum		Peter	Medieval	Church of England	North Creedy Team?	

== Defunct churches ==
Name	Civil parish	Dedication	Ref	Founded	Redundant	Denomination	Notes
All Saints, Blackborough	Kentisbeare (Blackborough)	All Saints			1990s	Church of England	Demolished 1990s, unsafe
St John the Evangelist, Tiverton	Tiverton	John the Evangelist		1836–1839	2005	Roman Catholic	
