= Grade II* listed buildings in Mid Devon =

Bickleigh Vicarage

There are over 20,000 Grade II* listed buildings in England. This page is a list of these buildings in the district of Mid Devon in Devon.

== Mid Devon ==
| Name | Location | Type | Completed (Note: The date given is the date used by Historic England as significant for the initial building or that of an important part in the structure's description.) | Date designated | Grid ref. (Note: The grid reference is based on the British national grid reference system, sometimes known as OSGB36, used by the Ordnance Survey.) Geo-coordinates | Entry number (Note: The "List Entry Number" is a unique number assigned to each listed building and scheduled monument by Historic England.) | Image |
|---|---|---|---|---|---|---|---|
| Leburn House and Lower Leburn, Including Stable Block and Rear Garden Walls | Bampton, Mid Devon | House | 17th century or possibly earlier | 5 April 1966 | SS9566822276; 50°59′25″N 3°29′16″W | 1106945 | Leburn House and Lower Leburn, Including Stable Block and Rear Garden Walls |
| Bickleigh Castle Chapel including Walls to Enclosure to South and West | Bickleigh | Fortified Manor House | 12th century | 28 August 1987 | SS9369406801; 50°51′03″N 3°30′41″W | 1325639 | Bickleigh Castle Chapel including Walls to Enclosure to South and West More images |
| Church of St Mary | Bickleigh | Parish Church | 13th century | 5 April 1966 | SS9422807183; 50°51′16″N 3°30′15″W | 1106964 | Church of St Mary More images |
| Old Court | Bickleigh | House | late 16th century early 17th century | 24 October 1951 | SS9363906772; 50°51′02″N 3°30′44″W | 1106959 | Upload Photo |
| Willis Farmhouse | Bickleigh | Farmhouse | circa early 16th century | 5 April 1966 | SS9416306748; 50°51′02″N 3°30′17″W | 1170531 | Upload Photo |
| Barakel and Riddaways Stores | Bow | House | Early 16th century | 20 November 1986 | SS7222001734; 50°48′04″N 3°48′53″W | 1170480 | Upload Photo |
| Comfort House | Bradninch | House | 1681 | 5 April 1966 | ST0004404187; 50°49′43″N 3°25′14″W | 1168358 | Comfort House |
| Hele Payne Farmhouse | Hele Payne, Bradninch | Farmhouse | 15th century | 11 June 1986 | SS9916202853; 50°48′59″N 3°25′58″W | 1105950 | Upload Photo |
| Stockwell Manor | Stockwell, Bradninch | Cross Passage House | C15/Early 16th century | 5 April 1966 | SS9761102860; 50°48′58″N 3°27′17″W | 1326142 | Upload Photo |
| Church of St Mary the Virgin | Brushford | Parish Church | Norman | 26 August 1965 | SS6769107665; 50°51′12″N 3°52′52″W | 1106600 | Church of St Mary the Virgin More images |
| Ayshford Court | Ayshford, Burlescombe | House | 1966 | 5 April 1966 | ST0482915233; 50°55′43″N 3°21′20″W | 1147581 | Ayshford Court More images |
| Barn Approximately 20 Metres North East of Ayshford Court | Ayshford, Burlescombe | Barn | 1988 | 17 March 1988 | ST0485615269; 50°55′44″N 3°21′19″W | 1106464 | Upload Photo |
| Parish Church of St Matthew | Butterleigh | Parish Church | Medieval | 11 June 1986 | SS9747508148; 50°51′49″N 3°27′30″W | 1326143 | Parish Church of St Matthew More images |
| Fursden House | Cadbury | Country House | 17th century or earlier origins | 5 April 1966 | SS9215204663; 50°49′53″N 3°31′58″W | 1253940 | Fursden House More images |
| The Old Hall | Chawleigh | House | C20 | 19 February 1986 | SS7126612618; 50°53′55″N 3°49′55″W | 1106616 | Upload Photo |
| Gorwyn Farmhouse | Cheriton Bishop | Farmhouse | probably 15th century | 20 May 1985 | SX7817193745; 50°43′50″N 3°43′39″W | 1105995 | Gorwyn Farmhouse |
| Old Rectory Including Forecourt Walls | Cheriton Bishop | Cross Passage House | late 14th century early 15th century | 26 August 1965 | SX7741293438; 50°43′39″N 3°44′18″W | 1169802 | Upload Photo |
| Tillerton Farmhouse | Cheriton Bishop | Farmhouse | Early 16th century | 20 May 1985 | SX7909495166; 50°44′37″N 3°42′54″W | 1105999 | Upload Photo |
| West Fursham Farmhouse including Garden Walls Adjoining to South-east | Cheriton Bishop | Farmhouse | Mid 16th century | 4 March 1988 | SX7150793488; 50°43′36″N 3°49′19″W | 1106065 | Upload Photo |
| Poole Barton including Adjoining Wall to North | Cheriton Fitzpaine | House | late 15th century early 16th century | 6 February 1952 | SS8672006126; 50°50′37″N 3°36′37″W | 1170421 | Poole Barton including Adjoining Wall to North |
| Stockadon Farmhouse | Cheriton Fitzpaine | Farmhouse | Early 16th century | 18 July 1975 | SS8841706447; 50°50′48″N 3°35′11″W | 1170656 | Upload Photo |
| The Manor House Barn | Cheriton Fitzpaine | Open Hall House | Early 16th century | 4 November 1985 | SS8677206037; 50°50′34″N 3°36′34″W | 1325596 | Upload Photo |
| The Old Almshouses | Cheriton Fitzpaine | House | c. 1970 | 4 November 1985 | SS8710806228; 50°50′40″N 3°36′17″W | 1170569 | The Old Almshouses More images |
| Upcott Barton Farmhouse including adjoining Front Garden Walls and Gate-piers to North-west and South-west | Cheriton Fitzpaine | Farmhouse | Early 16th century | 6 February 1952 | SS8680908504; 50°51′54″N 3°36′35″W | 1107025 | Upcott Barton Farmhouse including adjoining Front Garden Walls and Gate-piers to North-west and South-west More images |
| Church of St Petrock | Clannaborough | Parish Church | Early Medieval | 26 August 1965 | SS7470902534; 50°48′32″N 3°46′47″W | 1106979 | Church of St Petrock More images |
| Thorne | Clannaborough | Farmhouse | Late 14th century to early 15th century | 20 November 1986 | SS7369200242; 50°47′17″N 3°47′36″W | 1170909 | Upload Photo |
| Church of St Peter | Clayhanger | Parish Church | possibly 13th century | 5 April 1966 | ST0217422988; 50°59′53″N 3°23′44″W | 1325658 | Church of St Peter More images |
| Nutcombe Manor | Clayhanger | Dairy | late C16/early 17th century | 5 April 1966 | ST0158423405; 51°00′06″N 3°24′14″W | 1306679 | Nutcombe Manor |
| East Leigh Barton | East Leigh, Coldridge | Farmhouse | Probably Late C14-Early 15th century | 15 December 1986 | SS6967805384; 50°50′00″N 3°51′07″W | 1106560 | Upload Photo |
| Little Cutland | West Leigh, Coldridge | Farmhouse | Late C15-Early 16th century | 15 December 1986 | SS6887105288; 50°49′56″N 3°51′48″W | 1106567 | Upload Photo |
| Lower Chilverton | Coldridge | Farmhouse | Early 16th century | 14 December 1984 | SS6981906181; 50°50′26″N 3°51′01″W | 1325842 | Upload Photo |
| Great Heale Farmhouse | Colebrooke | Farmhouse | Early 17th century | 20 November 1986 | SX7552097835; 50°46′00″N 3°45′59″W | 1106987 | Upload Photo |
| Penstone Barton Farmhouse | Penstone, Colebrooke | Farmhouse | Probably 16th century | 26 August 1965 | SS7764400233; 50°47′19″N 3°44′14″W | 1259972 | Upload Photo |
| Spencer Cottage | Coleford, Colebrooke | House | Later 16th century improvements | 26 August 1965 | SS7718801086; 50°47′47″N 3°44′38″W | 1252961 | Spencer Cottage More images |
| Stone Gateway and Cob Garden Walls to South-east of Whelmstone Barton | Colebrooke | Privy House | 19th century | 26 August 1965 | SS7506300632; 50°47′30″N 3°46′26″W | 1106995 | Stone Gateway and Cob Garden Walls to South-east of Whelmstone Barton |
| Whelmstone Barton and Whelmstone Barton Cottage | Colebrooke | House | Medieval | 26 August 1965 | SS7503700654; 50°47′31″N 3°46′28″W | 1171153 | Upload Photo |
| Elston Barton including adjoining Cob Walls on South and East | Copplestone | Farmhouse | late 15th century early 16th century | 26 August 1965 | SS7850602611; 50°48′37″N 3°43′33″W | 1105938 | Elston Barton including adjoining Cob Walls on South and East More images |
| Farm Buildings Approx 12m North of Elston Barton Farmhouse and adjoining Courtyard Walls to South Between the Two | Copplestone | Wall | early to mid 17th century | 20 May 1985 | SS7851002628; 50°48′38″N 3°43′33″W | 1170202 | Upload Photo |
| Porch Cottage | Copplestone | House | Early-mid 17th century | 26 August 1965 | SS7711302578; 50°48′35″N 3°44′44″W | 1262034 | Upload Photo |
| Pownes House | Crediton | Town House | c. 1740 | 19 March 1951 | SS8291300349; 50°47′27″N 3°39′45″W | 1197105 | Upload Photo |
| 4 Union Terrace | Crediton | House | c. 1760 | 19 March 1951 | SS8331000255; 50°47′24″N 3°39′25″W | 1209796 | Upload Photo |
| 11 Union Road | Crediton | House | Late C18/Early 19th century | 11 October 1972 | SS8334600269; 50°47′25″N 3°39′23″W | 1209711 | Upload Photo |
| No 2 Barnside and adjoining Cob Garden Wall to West & and No 11 Uton Village including adjoining Cob Garden Wall to West | Uton, Crediton Hamlets | Farmhouse | 17th century | 20 May 1985 | SX8262898577; 50°46′30″N 3°39′58″W | 1258234 | Upload Photo |
| Downes | Crediton Hamlets | Country House | 1604 inscription | 20 May 1985 | SX8515199763; 50°47′10″N 3°37′50″W | 1170140 | Downes More images |
| Eastchurch Farmhouse and Adjoining Cottage | Crediton Hamlets | Farmhouse | Late C15-Early 16th century | 20 May 1985 | SX7376395377; 50°44′39″N 3°47′26″W | 1242847 | Upload Photo |
| Keymelford Farmhouse and Adjoining Cowshed to East | Crediton Hamlets | Farmhouse | Early 16th century | 26 August 1965 | SX7787099709; 50°47′03″N 3°44′02″W | 1105942 | Upload Photo |
| Little Harford | Crediton Hamlets | Farmhouse | late 15th century early 16th century | 20 May 1985 | SX8156396067; 50°45′07″N 3°40′49″W | 1326150 | Upload Photo |
| Trobridge House Including Adjoining Cottage and Two Rear Cob Walls to West and North | Crediton Hamlets | House | Mid-Late 19th century | 26 August 1965 | SX8353097828; 50°46′06″N 3°39′11″W | 1259890 | Upload Photo |
| Woodland Farmhouse | Crediton Hamlets | Farmhouse | Probably Early 16th century | 20 May 1985 | SX7740297049; 50°45′36″N 3°44′23″W | 1242735 | Upload Photo |
| Cruwys Morchard House and Walls to Walled Garden | Cruwys Morchard | House | Early 19th century | 5 April 1966 | SS8748112194; 50°53′54″N 3°36′05″W | 1254261 | Cruwys Morchard House and Walls to Walled Garden More images |
| Lychgate to Church of the Holy Cross | Cruwys Morchard | Lych Gate | Circa late 17th century | 28 August 1987 | SS8742912138; 50°53′52″N 3°36′08″W | 1261400 | Lychgate to Church of the Holy Cross More images |
| Hillersdon House | Hillersdon, Cullompton | Country House | 1848 | 5 April 1966 | SS9962607921; 50°51′43″N 3°25′39″W | 1326145 | Hillersdon House More images |
| Langford Court | Langford Court, Cullompton | Cross Passage House | Early 16th century | 5 April 1966 | ST0318402546; 50°48′52″N 3°22′32″W | 1168568 | Langford Court More images |
| The Manor House Hotel | Cullompton | Cross Passage House | 1603 | 24 October 1951 | ST0204507340; 50°51′26″N 3°23′35″W | 1105901 | The Manor House Hotel More images |
| 6 and 7 | Langford, Cullompton | House | Early 16th century | 11 June 1986 | ST0251703008; 50°49′06″N 3°23′07″W | 1168826 | 6 and 7 |
| 8 Fore Street | Cullompton | Merchants House | 17th century | 24 October 1951 | ST0204407294; 50°51′25″N 3°23′35″W | 1326170 | 8 Fore Street More images |
| Barton Lands Farmhouse | Hillmoor, Culmstock | Farmhouse | Probably late 15th century | 17 March 1988 | ST1083013489; 50°54′50″N 3°16′11″W | 1147686 | Upload Photo |
| Church of All Saints | Culmstock | Parish Church | C15, some phases early 16th century | 5 April 1966 | ST1024313531; 50°54′51″N 3°16′41″W | 1325886 | Church of All Saints More images |
| Prescott Baptist Chapel | Prescott, Culmstock | Baptist Chapel | 1715 | 5 April 1966 | ST0913514328; 50°55′16″N 3°17′39″W | 1147714 | Prescott Baptist Chapel More images |
| Spicelands Meeting and Caretakers House | Culmstock | House | 1690 | 5 April 1966 | ST0831514055; 50°55′07″N 3°18′21″W | 1147652 | Upload Photo |
| Bartonbury Farmhouse | Down St. Mary | Farmhouse | Mid-late 16th century | 26 August 1965 | SS7389803465; 50°49′01″N 3°47′29″W | 1242518 | Upload Photo |
| Chaffcombe Farmhouse including Cob Walls adjoining to South and West | Down St. Mary | Farmhouse | 1965 | 26 August 1965 | SS7591703064; 50°48′50″N 3°45′46″W | 1242548 | Upload Photo |
| The Old Rectory | Down St Mary | House | 1986 | 20 November 1986 | SS7437804255; 50°49′27″N 3°47′06″W | 1242601 | Upload Photo |
| Church of All Saints | Eggesford | Parish Church | 15th century | 26 August 1965 | SS6871611135; 50°53′05″N 3°52′04″W | 1162978 | Church of All Saints More images |
| Chapel 110 Metres North East of Bridwell Park | Bridwell, Halberton | Chapel | 1792 | 11 June 1986 | ST0591312690; 50°54′22″N 3°20′22″W | 1105882 | Upload Photo |
| Herne Place with attached Barn and Outbuildings Adjoining to West, and Front Garden Railings | Halberton | Farmhouse | Mid 17th century | 5 April 1966 | ST0018412021; 50°53′56″N 3°25′15″W | 1306796 | Herne Place with attached Barn and Outbuildings Adjoining to West, and Front Garden Railings More images |
| Leonard Farmhouse | Halberton | Farmhouse | 15th century | 11 June 1986 | ST0023409550; 50°52′37″N 3°25′10″W | 1326161 | Upload Photo |
| Old Cordwents and Cordwents Cottage | Halberton | Cross Passage House | 15th century or Early 16th century | 11 June 1986 | ST0042712780; 50°54′21″N 3°25′03″W | 1106644 | Old Cordwents and Cordwents Cottage |
| Rock House and adjacent Range of Outbuildings to Rear | Halberton | Country House | c. 1814 | 5 April 1966 | ST0168913118; 50°54′33″N 3°23′59″W | 1306712 | Rock House and adjacent Range of Outbuildings to Rear More images |
| Sellake Farmhouse | Sellake, Halberton | Farmhouse | c. 1600 | 5 April 1966 | ST0023914099; 50°55′04″N 3°25′14″W | 1168935 | Sellake Farmhouse |
| Stables immediately North North East of Bridwell Park | Bridwell, Halberton | Hayloft | 1779 | 11 June 1986 | ST0584612613; 50°54′19″N 3°20′26″W | 1168895 | Upload Photo |
| The Priory | Halberton | Cross Passage House | 1539 | 24 October 1951 | ST0071813031; 50°54′29″N 3°24′48″W | 1106643 | Upload Photo |
| Church of St Mary | Hemyock | Parish Church | early norman | 5 April 1966 | ST1358613260; 50°54′44″N 3°13′50″W | 1169390 | Church of St Mary More images |
| Culmbridge Manor | Hemyock | Farmhouse | Mid 17th century | 15 April 1987 | ST1436713608; 50°54′56″N 3°13′10″W | 1106519 | Culmbridge Manor |
| Hemyock Castle Gatehouse and Curtain Walls | Hemyock | Castle | c. 1380 | 5 April 1966 | ST1352213282; 50°54′45″N 3°13′53″W | 1325852 | Hemyock Castle Gatehouse and Curtain Walls More images |
| Medlake Farmhouse | Hittisleigh | Farmhouse | Probably early-mid 16th century | 20 May 1985 | SX7270694959; 50°44′25″N 3°48′19″W | 1258376 | Upload Photo |
| Whitethorn Farmhouse | Hittisleigh | Farmhouse | Early-Mid 17th century | 20 May 1985 | SX7328194559; 50°44′12″N 3°47′50″W | 1273372 | Whitethorn Farmhouse |
| Church of St Simon and St Jude | Hockworthy | Parish Church | Probably 15th century | 5 April 1966 | ST0398219533; 50°58′02″N 3°22′08″W | 1106446 | Church of St Simon and St Jude More images |
| Court Hall Farmhouse | Hockworthy | Farmhouse | 1966 | 5 April 1966 | ST0377319455; 50°57′59″N 3°22′18″W | 1147804 | Upload Photo |
| Home Farmhouse (Vicarage Farmhouse on O.S.) including Front Garden Revettment Walls adjoining to South East & Home Farmhouse including Front Garden Revettment Walls adjoining to South East | Hockworthy | Farmhouse | Late C14-early 15th century | 17 March 1988 | ST0384119445; 50°57′59″N 3°22′15″W | 1325894 | Upload Photo |
| Stallenge Thorne Farmhouse Including Rear Courtyard | Hockworthy | Farmhouse | Probable earlier parts | 5 April 1966 | ST0276920895; 50°58′45″N 3°23′11″W | 1106444 | Stallenge Thorne Farmhouse Including Rear Courtyard More images |
| Dovecote and Adjoining Stable Yard Walls Approximately 2 Metres East of Holcombe Court | Holcombe Rogus | Wall | c. 1845 | 5 April 1966 | ST0559319016; 50°57′46″N 3°20′45″W | 1307154 | Dovecote and Adjoining Stable Yard Walls Approximately 2 Metres East of Holcombe Court More images |
| Freathingcott Farmhouse | Holcombe Rogus | Farmhouse | Early 17th century | 17 March 1988 | ST0635420144; 50°58′23″N 3°20′07″W | 1147848 | Freathingcott Farmhouse More images |
| The Priest House | Holcombe Rogus | Cruck House | Early or mid 16th century | 17 March 1988 | ST0564518995; 50°57′45″N 3°20′42″W | 1307172 | The Priest House |
| Church of All Saints | Huntsham | Parish Church | 14th century | 5 April 1966 | ST0013720461; 50°58′30″N 3°25′26″W | 1169256 | Church of All Saints More images |
| Huntsham Court including Walls and Gate Piers to Courtyard Immediately to the West | Huntsham | Country House | 1868-70 | 7 December 1987 | ST0018120600; 50°58′34″N 3°25′23″W | 1169316 | Huntsham Court including Walls and Gate Piers to Courtyard Immediately to the West More images |
| Church of St John the Baptist | Kennerleigh | Parish Church | 14th century | 26 August 1965 | SS8196307448; 50°51′16″N 3°40′42″W | 1107038 | Church of St John the Baptist More images |
| Court Barton | Kentisbeare | Farmhouse | Early 17th century | 5 April 1966 | ST0659008167; 50°51′56″N 3°19′43″W | 1169958 | Upload Photo |
| Priesthall | Kentisbeare | House | by 1681 | 24 October 1951 | ST0675008146; 50°51′55″N 3°19′35″W | 1106504 | Priesthall |
| Bury Barton Farmhouse | Lapford | Farmhouse | late 14th century - early 15th century | 26 August 1965 | SS7328807116; 50°50′59″N 3°48′05″W | 1106998 | Upload Photo |
| Inner Court of Farmbuildings adjoining to North of Bury Barton Farmhouse | Lapford | Garage | Early 19th century | 4 November 1985 | SS7329907147; 50°51′00″N 3°48′04″W | 1170703 | Upload Photo |
| Outer Court of Farmbuildings Approximately 25 Metres North-east of Bury Barton Farmhouse | Lapford | Courtyard | Early 19th century | 4 November 1985 | SS7327307179; 50°51′01″N 3°48′06″W | 1106999 | Upload Photo |
| Pennycotts Farmhouse including Outbuildings adjoining to West | Lapford | Farmhouse | Early 16th century | 26 August 1965 | SS7226306409; 50°50′35″N 3°48′56″W | 1263470 | Upload Photo |
| Church of St Mary | Calverleigh, Loxbeare | Parish Church | 14th century | 5 April 1966 | SS9230714292; 50°55′05″N 3°32′00″W | 1169381 | Church of St Mary More images |
| Parish Church (dedication unknown) | Loxbeare | Parish Church | early medieval | 5 April 1966 | SS9118316115; 50°56′03″N 3°33′00″W | 1106929 | Parish Church (dedication unknown) More images |
| Rudge Farmhouse | Morchard Bishop | Farmhouse | Late C14/Early 15th century | 4 November 1985 | SS7446007607; 50°51′16″N 3°47′06″W | 1263333 | Upload Photo |
| Church of St George | Morebath | Parish Church | 13th century | 5 April 1966 | SS9542325047; 51°00′55″N 3°29′32″W | 1106898 | Church of St George More images |
| East Holme & East Holme Cottage | West Town, Newton St. Cyres | Farmhouse | probably 15th century | 26 August 1965 | SX8764397577; 50°46′01″N 3°35′41″W | 1107040 | Upload Photo |
| Sweetham Bridge | Newton St. Cyres | Road Bridge | late C16-early 17th century | 26 August 1965 | SX8808498567; 50°46′33″N 3°35′19″W | 1309905 | Sweetham Bridge More images |
| Cleaveanger Farmhouse including Barn adjoining to East | Nymet Rowland | Farmhouse | Late C15-Early 16th century | 15 December 1986 | SS7126207009; 50°50′54″N 3°49′48″W | 1163188 | Upload Photo |
| South Yeo Farmhouse and Cottage | Poughill | Farmhouse | Early 16th century | 4 November 1985 | SS8651308504; 50°51′54″N 3°36′50″W | 1250718 | Upload Photo |
| Church of St Thomas of Canterbury | Puddington | Parish Church | 15th century | 26 August 1965 | SS8335210659; 50°53′01″N 3°39′35″W | 1250798 | Church of St Thomas of Canterbury More images |
| East Pitt Farmhouse | Sampford Peverell | Farmhouse | Late C15-early 16th century | 5 April 1966 | ST0353116197; 50°56′14″N 3°22′27″W | 1325885 | Upload Photo |
| The Old Rectory Including Front Garden Walls | Sampford Peverell | House | 1966 | 5 April 1966 | ST0298414242; 50°55′10″N 3°22′54″W | 1168276 | Upload Photo |
| Barton Court | Shute, Sandford | Kitchen | Late C16-Early 17th century | 20 May 1985 | SS8267302505; 50°48′37″N 3°40′00″W | 1243225 | Upload Photo |
| Bremridge Farmhouse including Two adjoining Cob Garden Walls to South West | Sandford | Farmhouse | 16th century | 26 August 1965 | SS8440504155; 50°49′31″N 3°38′33″W | 1258512 | Upload Photo |
| Higher Furzeland Farmhouse Including Adjoining Cob Garden Wall to South West | Sandford | Farmhouse | 17th century | 20 May 1985 | SS7841003507; 50°49′06″N 3°43′39″W | 1258698 | Upload Photo |
| Prowse Farmhouse | Sandford | Cross Passage House | Probably Late 15th century | 26 August 1965 | SS8434305501; 50°50′15″N 3°38′38″W | 1272973 | Upload Photo |
| Stone Cross Approximately 8 Metres South of Church of St Swithun | Sandford | Cross | C14-C15 | 26 August 1965 | SS8286902511; 50°48′37″N 3°39′50″W | 1258907 | Upload Photo |
| Whiterose Farmhouse | Sandford | Farmhouse | Later 16th century | 20 May 1985 | SS8517104558; 50°49′45″N 3°37′55″W | 1272972 | Upload Photo |
| Church of St Swithin | Shobrooke | Parish Church | Anglo-Saxon/Norman origins | 26 August 1965 | SS8629201106; 50°47′54″N 3°36′53″W | 1107048 | Church of St Swithin More images |
| Great Gutton Farmhouse | Shobrooke | Farmhouse | possibly earlier | 26 August 1965 | SS8613202485; 50°48′38″N 3°37′03″W | 1107045 | Upload Photo |
| Uppincott Barton | Uppincott, Shobrooke | Farmhouse | Early 17th century | 30 November 1984 | SS8848702492; 50°48′40″N 3°35′03″W | 1107059 | Upload Photo |
| Clysthayes Farmhouse | Silverton | Farmhouse | Early 16th century | 11 June 1986 | SS9897702100; 50°48′35″N 3°26′07″W | 1106650 | Upload Photo |
| Dunsmore Farmhouse | Dunsmore, Silverton | Farmhouse | Early 16th century | 5 April 1966 | SS9561601424; 50°48′11″N 3°28′58″W | 1169093 | Upload Photo |
| Ellerhayes Bridge | Broadclyst, Silverton | Road Bridge | possibly 15th century | 11 November 1952 | SS9756501178; 50°48′04″N 3°27′18″W | 1098339 | Ellerhayes Bridge More images |
| Great Pit Farmhouse | Silverton | Farmhouse | 15th century | 11 June 1986 | SS9521303312; 50°49′11″N 3°29′20″W | 1306664 | Upload Photo |
| 2 Fore Street | Silverton | Cross Passage House | Pre 15th century | 5 April 1966 | SS9556702871; 50°48′57″N 3°29′02″W | 1325820 | 2 Fore Street More images |
| 4 Fore Street | Silverton, Silverton, Mid Devon | Cross Passage House | Pre 15th century | 5 April 1966 | SS9556802877; 50°48′58″N 3°29′02″W | 1169219 | 4 Fore Street |
| 8 Fore Street | Silverton | Cross Passage House | Pre 15th century | 5 April 1966 | SS9557202894; 50°48′58″N 3°29′01″W | 1306662 | Upload Photo |
| 10 and 12 Fore Street | Silverton | Cross Passage House | Pre 15th century | 5 April 1966 | SS9557302901; 50°48′58″N 3°29′01″W | 1325819 | Upload Photo |
| Church of St Mary the Virgin | Stockleigh English | Parish Church | 14th century | 26 August 1965 | SS8501506332; 50°50′42″N 3°38′05″W | 1250872 | Church of St Mary the Virgin More images |
| Frogpool | Stockleigh Pomeroy | Farmhouse | Late C15/Early 16th century | 4 November 1985 | SS8780203716; 50°49′19″N 3°35′39″W | 1262958 | Upload Photo |
| Church of St Margaret | Stoodleigh | Parish Church | 15th century | 5 April 1966 | SS9225818830; 50°57′32″N 3°32′08″W | 1325674 | Church of St Margaret More images |
| Garden House and Boundary Walls of the Courtyard to the North East of Ravenswood School | Stoodleigh | Gate Pier | 1883 | 7 December 1987 | SS9170918707; 50°57′27″N 3°32′36″W | 1169927 | Upload Photo |
| Ravenswood School | Stoodleigh | Country House | 1883 | 7 December 1987 | SS9169418675; 50°57′26″N 3°32′36″W | 1106910 | Upload Photo |
| Church of St David | Thelbridge | Parish Church | Medieval | 26 August 1965 | SS7875412160; 50°53′46″N 3°43′32″W | 1262898 | Church of St David More images |
| Dunsaller | Thorverton | House | 17th century | 28 August 1987 | SS9210601406; 50°48′08″N 3°31′57″W | 1261223 | Upload Photo |
| Amory House | Tiverton | House | About 1700 | 12 February 1952 | SS9539612631; 50°54′13″N 3°29′20″W | 1384912 | Amory House More images |
| Chevithorne Barton | Chevithorne, Tiverton | Manor House | Early 17th century | 12 February 1952 | SS9861415847; 50°55′59″N 3°26′39″W | 1384703 | Chevithorne Barton More images |
| Chilcot School Including Number 4 at Rear | Tiverton | House | 2000 | 12 February 1952 | SS9537812585; 50°54′12″N 3°29′21″W | 1384948 | Chilcot School Including Number 4 at Rear More images |
| Gotham House including Forecourt Walls and Entrance Gates | Tiverton | Town House | Early 18th century | 12 February 1952 | SS9551712446; 50°54′07″N 3°29′14″W | 1384877 | Gotham House including Forecourt Walls and Entrance Gates More images |
| Great House of St George | Tiverton | Cross Passage House | c. 1613 | 12 February 1952 | SS9539912571; 50°54′11″N 3°29′20″W | 1384950 | Great House of St George More images |
| Old Farmhouse with Integral Barn at East Barton | East Barton, Tiverton | Farmhouse | 16th century | 22 March 1996 | SS9451908679; 50°52′05″N 3°30′01″W | 1384813 | Upload Photo |
| Waldrons Almshouses and Adjoining Chapel | Tiverton | Almshouse | 1579 | 12 February 1952 | SS9506112613; 50°54′12″N 3°29′38″W | 1384977 | Waldrons Almshouses and Adjoining Chapel More images |
| Coldharbour Working Mill Museum | Coldharbour, Uffculme | Stonemasons Yard | 1799 | 15 April 1987 | ST0618712190; 50°54′06″N 3°20′08″W | 1106486 | Coldharbour Working Mill Museum More images |
| Gill's Cottage | Craddock, Uffculme | Cross Passage House | Early 17th century | 15 April 1987 | ST0878312566; 50°54′19″N 3°17′55″W | 1170475 | Upload Photo |
| Parish Church of St Mary | Uffculme | Parish Church | Early 14th century | 5 April 1966 | ST0686212718; 50°54′23″N 3°19′34″W | 1325871 | Parish Church of St Mary More images |
| Church of St Peter | Uplowman | Parish Church | Late C15-early 16th century | 5 April 1966 | ST0132915504; 50°55′50″N 3°24′20″W | 1168409 | Church of St Peter More images |
| Gate House to Middle Coombe Farmhouse | Uplowman | Carriageway | Late C16-early 17th century | 5 April 1966 | ST0004217029; 50°56′38″N 3°25′27″W | 1307055 | Upload Photo |
| Gatehouse with Bridge and Stable Block Adjoining West of Widhayes Farmhouse | Uplowman | Gatehouse & Bridge | Mid 18th century | 5 April 1966 | ST0036814525; 50°55′18″N 3°25′08″W | 1325910 | Upload Photo |
| Higher Chieflowman Farmhouse including Front Garden Walls | Uplowman | Farmhouse | Mid 17th century | 5 April 1966 | ST0054415641; 50°55′54″N 3°25′00″W | 1106400 | Higher Chieflowman Farmhouse including Front Garden Walls |
| Linhay approximately 20 Metres West of Widhayes Farmhouse | Uplowman | Hayloft | Mid 17th century | 5 April 1966 | ST0035314500; 50°55′17″N 3°25′09″W | 1106406 | Upload Photo |
| Middle Coombe Farmhouse including Rear Court Yard Walls | Uplowman | Farnhouse | Probably late C16-early 17th century | 5 April 1966 | ST0003517037; 50°56′39″N 3°25′27″W | 1325907 | Upload Photo |
| Spalsbury Farmhouse including Garden Area Wall to the South East | Uplowman | Farmhouse | Early-mid 16th century | 5 April 1966 | ST0244417580; 50°56′58″N 3°23′24″W | 1106403 | Upload Photo |
| Uplowman Court Farmhouse | Uplowman | Farmhouse | 1966 | 5 April 1966 | ST0129815539; 50°55′51″N 3°24′21″W | 1325911 | Upload Photo |
| Upton Hellions Barton including Cider House and Store Adjoining to North East | Upton Hellions | Farmhouse | 1985 | 20 May 1985 | SS8378403472; 50°49′09″N 3°39′04″W | 1272809 | Upload Photo |
| Church of St Mary the Virgin | Washfield | Parish Church | circa late 15th century | 5 April 1966 | SS9353015406; 50°55′42″N 3°30′59″W | 1106889 | Church of St Mary the Virgin More images |
| Wynerfreds | Washfield | Farmhouse | Late C19/early C20 | 5 April 1966 | SS9352515207; 50°55′35″N 3°30′59″W | 1106888 | Upload Photo |
| Church of St Peter | Washford Pyne | Church | 15th century | 26 August 1965 | SS8122611832; 50°53′37″N 3°41′25″W | 1251263 | Church of St Peter More images |
| Pyne Farmhouse including Cob Garden Wall Adjoining to South | Washford Pyne | Farmhouse | 16th century | 26 August 1965 | SS8026410391; 50°52′50″N 3°42′12″W | 1262871 | Upload Photo |
| Church of St Michael and All Saints | Wembworthy | Parish Church | Medieval origins | 26 August 1965 | SS6628309877; 50°52′22″N 3°54′07″W | 1163114 | Church of St Michael and All Saints More images |
| Rashleigh Barton including Rubble Walls and Outbuildings adjoining to East | Rashleigh Barton, Wembworthy | Farmhouse | Late Medieval/C16 core | 6 February 1952 | SS6719212884; 50°54′00″N 3°53′24″W | 1106584 | Rashleigh Barton including Rubble Walls and Outbuildings adjoining to East More images |
| Church of St Mary | Woolfardisworthy | Parish Church | Medieval | 26 August 1965 | SS8275608598; 50°51′54″N 3°40′03″W | 1251331 | Church of St Mary More images |
| Barn approximately 40 Metres East of Hayne Farmhouse | Zeal Monachorum | Threshing Barn | Mid 17th century | 15 December 1986 | SS7168203369; 50°48′56″N 3°49′22″W | 1163389 | Upload Photo |
| Church of St Peter the Apostle | Zeal Monachorum | Parish Church | 12th century | 26 August 1965 | SS7199804019; 50°49′17″N 3°49′07″W | 1106544 | Church of St Peter the Apostle More images |
| Hayne Farmhouse | Zeal Monachorum | Farmhouse | Mid 17th century | 15 December 1986 | SS7163203387; 50°48′57″N 3°49′25″W | 1325834 | Upload Photo |
| Heron Court including Outbuildings adjoining to West and Cob Garden Walls Adjoining to North | Zeal Monachorum | House | 1965 | 26 August 1965 | SS7202003995; 50°49′17″N 3°49′06″W | 1106540 | Upload Photo |
