= Deanery of Cadbury =

Administrative unit of the Church of England

The Deanery of Cadbury represents the Church of England in mid Devon, within the Archdeaconry of Exeter and the Diocese of Exeter. The current rural dean is Matthew Tregenza.

== Benefice of Crediton, Shobrooke, and Sandford with Upton Hellions ==
Parishes within the United Benefice:

- Crediton (Holy Cross and the Mother of Him who hung thereon) with St Lawrence, Yeoford (Holy Trinity), Posbury (St Luke)
- Shobrooke (St Swithin)
- Sandford, Devon (St Swithun) with New Buildings (Beacon Church) and Upton Hellions (St Mary the Virgin)

Clergy:

- Revd Prebendary Matthew Tregenza Rector

Revd Sandra Collier, Deacon

== Benefice of Cheriton Fitzpaine, Woolfardisworthy, Kennerleigh, Washford Pyne, Puddington, Poughill, Stockleigh English, Morchard Bishop, Stockleigh Pomeroy, Down Saint Mary, Clannaborough, Lapford, Nymet Rowland, Coldridge, Bow, Colebrooke and Zeal Monachorum ==
- Bow (St Bartholomew)
- Cheriton Fitzpaine (St Matthew)
- Clannaborough (St Petrock)
- Coldridge (St Matthew)
- Colebrooke (St Andrew)
- Down St Mary (St Mary the Virgin) with Knowle (St Boniface)
- Kennerleigh (St John the Baptist)
- Lapford (St Thomas of Canterbury)
- Morchard Bishop (St Mary)
- Nymet Rowland see Bow
- Poughill (St Michael and All Angels)
- Puddington (St Thomas a Beckett)
- Stockleigh English (St Mary the Virgin)
- Stockleigh Pomeroy (St Mary the Virgin)
- Washford Pyne (St Peter)
- Woolfardisworthy East (St Mary)
- Zeal Monachorum (St Peter)

== Benefice of Brampford Speke, Cadbury, Newton Saint Cyres, Rewe, Stoke Canon, Huxham, Thorverton and Upton Pyne ==
- Rewe with Nether Exe
- Stoke Canon with Huxham
- Brampford Speke
- Cadbury
- Newton St Cyres
- Thorverton
- Upton Pyne
