= Grade I listed buildings in Mid Devon =

There are over 9,000 Grade I listed buildings in England. This page is a list of these buildings in the district of Mid Devon in Devon.

== Mid Devon ==
Name	Location	Type	Completed (Note: The date given is the date used by Historic England as significant for the initial building or that of an important part in the structure's description.)	Date designated	Grid ref. (Note: The grid reference is based on the British national grid reference system, sometimes known as OSGB36, used by the Ordnance Survey.) Geo-coordinates	Entry number (Note: The "List Entry Number" is a unique number assigned to each listed building and scheduled monument by Historic England.)	Image
Church of St Michael and All Angels	Bampton	Parish Church	13th century	5 April 1966	SS9566622245; 50°59′24″N 3°29′17″W	1306717	Church of St Michael and All Angels More images
Bickleigh Castle	Bickleigh, Mid Devon	Fortified Manor House	circa early 15th century	28 August 1987	SS9365206800; 50°51′03″N 3°30′44″W	1325638	Bickleigh Castle More images
Church of St Bartholomew	Nymet Tracey, Bow, Mid Devon	Parish Church	Norman to Transitional	26 August 1965	SS7274400664; 50°47′30″N 3°48′25″W	1107017	Church of St Bartholomew More images
Bradninch Manor	Bradninch, Mid Devon	Detached House	Post 18th century	16 September 1977	ST0032904105; 50°49′40″N 3°25′00″W	1105925	Bradninch Manor More images
Ayshford Chapel	Ayshford, Burlescombe, Mid Devon	Private Chapel	15th century	5 April 1966	ST0483015211; 50°55′43″N 3°21′20″W	1325900	Ayshford Chapel More images
Canonsleigh Priory Gatehouse	Burlescombe, Mid Devon	Augustinian Nunnery	15th century	24 October 1951	ST0669717380; 50°56′54″N 3°19′46″W	1106457	Canonsleigh Priory Gatehouse More images
Church of St Mary the Virgin	Burlescombe, Mid Devon	Parish Church	15th century	5 April 1966	ST0760216634; 50°56′30″N 3°18′59″W	1106465	Church of St Mary the Virgin More images
Church of St Michael and All Angels	Cadbury	Tower	Possibly 13th century	5 April 1966	SS9108904944; 50°50′01″N 3°32′53″W	1261589	Church of St Michael and All Angels More images
Church of St Bartholomew	Cadeleigh, Mid Devon	Tower	Possibly late 14th century	5 April 1966	SS9140207915; 50°51′38″N 3°32′40″W	1253997	Church of St Bartholomew More images
Church of St James	Chawleigh, Mid Devon	Parish Church	15th century	26 August 1965	SS7120312658; 50°53′56″N 3°49′59″W	1325813	Church of St James More images
Church of St Mary the Virgin	Cheriton Bishop, Mid Devon	Parish Church	Norman origins	26 August 1965	SX7732593566; 50°43′43″N 3°44′22″W	1105969	Church of St Mary the Virgin More images
Church of St Matthew	Cheriton Fitzpaine, Mid Devon	Parish Church	14th century	26 August 1965	SS8673606181; 50°50′39″N 3°36′36″W	1325593	Church of St Matthew More images
Church of St Andrew	Clayhidon, Mid Devon	Parish Church	Late 13th century	5 April 1966	ST1613515597; 50°56′01″N 3°11′41″W	1325826	Church of St Andrew More images
Church of St Matthew	Coldridge, Mid Devon	Parish Church	Late 12th century to Early 13th century	26 August 1965	SS6984607647; 50°51′13″N 3°51′02″W	1106595	Church of St Matthew More images
Church of St Andrew	Colebrooke	Parish Church	Transitional Norman	26 August 1965	SS7699600019; 50°47′12″N 3°44′47″W	1171235	Church of St Andrew More images
Copplestone Cross	Copplestone, Mid Devon	Boundary Stone	10th century	26 August 1965	SS7706602604; 50°48′36″N 3°44′46″W	1242841	Copplestone Cross More images
Church of the Holy Cross	Crediton, Mid Devon	Chapter House	13th century	19 March 1951	SS8364100204; 50°47′23″N 3°39′08″W	1209720	Church of the Holy Cross More images
Church of the Holy Cross	Cruwys Morchard, Cruwys Morchard, Mid Devon	Tower	Rebuilt after fire	28 August 1987	SS8743012162; 50°53′53″N 3°36′08″W	1254134	Church of the Holy Cross More images
Church of St Andrew	Cullompton, Mid Devon	Parish Church	First half of 15th century	11 June 1986	ST0218907170; 50°51′21″N 3°23′28″W	1306902	Church of St Andrew More images
The Walronds	Cullompton, Mid Devon	Cross Passage House	1605	24 October 1951	ST0204507311; 50°51′25″N 3°23′35″W	1105902	The Walronds More images
Church of St Mary the Virgin	Down St Mary, Mid Devon	Parish Church	Possible Anglo-Saxon origins	26 August 1965	SS7429304461; 50°49′34″N 3°47′10″W	1242581	Church of St Mary the Virgin More images
Bridwell Park	Bridwell, Halberton, Mid Devon	Country House	1776-80	5 April 1966	ST0584312580; 50°54′18″N 3°20′26″W	1326159	Bridwell Park More images
Moorstone Barton	Moorstone Barton, Halberton, Mid Devon	Farmhouse	Mid 14th century	5 April 1966	ST0160009916; 50°52′49″N 3°24′00″W	1306763	Moorstone Barton More images
Church of St Andrew	Halberton, Mid Devon	Parish Church	Medieval	5 April 1966	ST0056412893; 50°54′25″N 3°24′56″W	1306759	Church of St Andrew More images
Church of St Andrew	Hittisleigh Barton, Hittisleigh, Mid Devon	Parish Church	Late 13th century	26 August 1965	SX7336795445; 50°44′41″N 3°47′46″W	1273398	Church of St Andrew More images
Church of All Saints	Holcombe Rogus, Mid Devon	Parish Church	15th century	5 April 1966	ST0564919025; 50°57′46″N 3°20′42″W	1106421	Church of All Saints More images
Holcombe Court	Holcombe Rogus, Mid Devon	Country House	Early 16th century	24 October 1951	ST0556119025; 50°57′46″N 3°20′46″W	1168134	Holcombe Court More images
Church of St Mary	Kentisbeare, Mid Devon	Parish Church	by 1529	5 April 1966	ST0680008109; 50°51′54″N 3°19′33″W	1106503	Church of St Mary More images
Wood Barton	Kentisbeare, Mid Devon	Farmhouse	early to mid 14th century	5 April 1966	ST0552708803; 50°52′16″N 3°20′38″W	1106496	Upload Photo
Chapel Approximately 40 Metres North-east of Bury Barton Farmhouse	Lapford, Mid Devon	Chapel	Originally Saxon, rebuilt 15th century	26 August 1965	SS7325007185; 50°51′01″N 3°48′07″W	1325618	Chapel Approximately 40 Metres North-east of Bury Barton Farmhouse More images
Church of St Thomas of Canterbury	Lapford, Mid Devon	Late 12th century church with outstanding 16th century carved screen. Built on the King's orders by a family involved in the murder of Thomas a Becket	15th century; chancel rebuilt 19th century	26 August 1965	SS7315208277; 50°51′36″N 3°48′13″W	1250085	Church of St Thomas of Canterbury More images
Church of St Mary	Morchard Bishop, Mid Devon	Parish Church	MEDIEVAL ORIGINS	26 August 1965	SS7731107485; 50°51′14″N 3°44′40″W	1263283	Church of St Mary More images
Church of St Cyriac and St Julitta	Newton St Cyres, Mid Devon	Sculpture	Early 15th century	26 August 1965	SX8792997996; 50°46′14″N 3°35′26″W	1161827	Church of St Cyriac and St Julitta More images
Church of St Bartholomew	Nymet Rowland, Mid Devon	Parish Church	12th century	26 August 1965	SS7111508213; 50°51′32″N 3°49′57″W	1106570	Church of St Bartholomew More images
Church of St Michael	Poughill, Mid Devon	Parish Church	13th century	26 August 1965	SS8567508457; 50°51′51″N 3°37′33″W	1250726	Church of St Michael More images
Church of St John the Baptist	Sampford Peverell, Mid Devon	Parish Church	Mid 13th century	5 April 1966	ST0297614275; 50°55′11″N 3°22′54″W	1106431	Church of St John the Baptist More images
Church of St Swithun	Sandford	Sundial	1818	26 August 1965	SS8286302527; 50°48′37″N 3°39′50″W	1258905	Church of St Swithun More images
Church of St Mary the Virgin	Silverton	Parish Church	15th century	5 April 1966	SS9567402796; 50°48′55″N 3°28′56″W	1106629	Church of St Mary the Virgin More images
Church of St Mary	Stockleigh Pomeroy, Mid Devon	Parish Church	13th century	26 August 1965	SS8766503560; 50°49′14″N 3°35′46″W	1251012	Church of St Mary More images
Church of St Thomas of Canterbury	Thorverton, Mid Devon	Tower	15th century porch	5 April 1966	SS9246602184; 50°48′33″N 3°31′39″W	1240595	Church of St Thomas of Canterbury More images
Church of St George	Tiverton, Mid Devon	Warehouse	1717-1726	12 February 1952	SS9542912460; 50°54′08″N 3°29′19″W	1384825	Church of St George More images
Church of St Peter	Tiverton, Mid Devon	Parish Church	15th century	12 February 1952	SS9541712840; 50°54′20″N 3°29′20″W	1384949	Church of St Peter More images
Knightshayes Court	Tiverton, Mid Devon	Country House	1869-1874	12 May 1975	SS9602415147; 50°55′35″N 3°28′51″W	1384684	Knightshayes Court More images
Old Blundells Including Forecourt Walls on North East and Entrance Arch and Gates and 2 Lodges	Tiverton, Mid Devon	Kitchen	1604	12 February 1952	SS9579212492; 50°54′09″N 3°29′00″W	1384961	Old Blundells Including Forecourt Walls on North East and Entrance Arch and Gates and 2 Lodges More images
Tiverton Castle	Tiverton, Mid Devon	Castle	14th century core	12 February 1952	SS9543812897; 50°54′22″N 3°29′19″W	1384869	Tiverton Castle More images
Bradfield House	Uffculme, Mid Devon	Country House	Mid 16th century	24 October 1951	ST0518409958; 50°52′53″N 3°20′57″W	1170026	Bradfield House More images
Church of St Mary	Upton Hellions, Mid Devon	Bell Tower	Late 12th century	20 May 1985	SS8422103299; 50°49′03″N 3°38′42″W	1243553	Church of St Mary More images
Church of St Mary the Virgin	Willand, Mid Devon	Parish Church	15th century	5 April 1966	ST0368910428; 50°53′07″N 3°22′14″W	1306617	Church of St Mary the Virgin More images
