= Quadrangular castle =

Type of castle

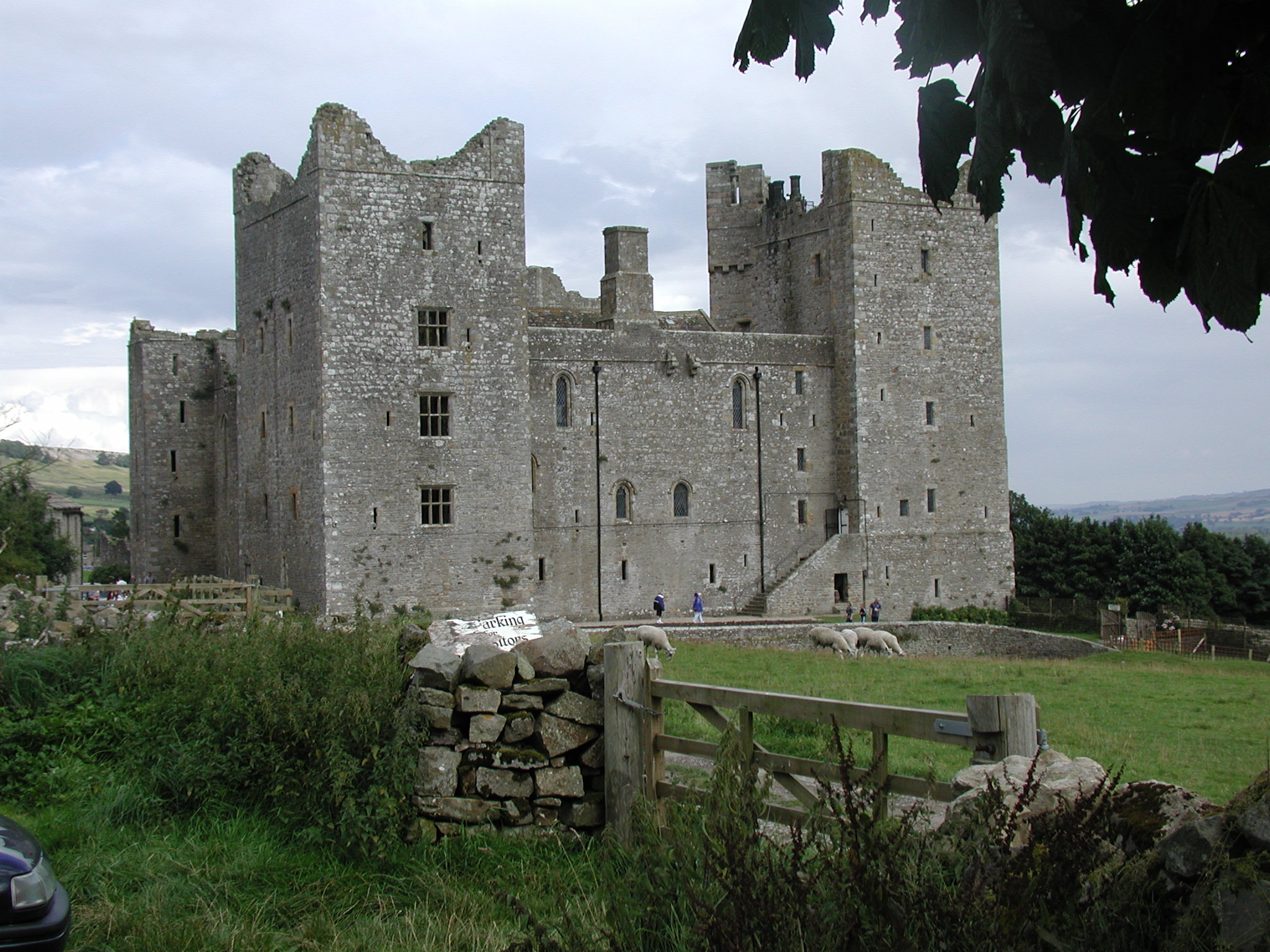
Bolton Castle, in England

A quadrangular castle or courtyard castle is a type of castle characterised by ranges of buildings which are integral with the curtain walls, enclosing a central ward or quadrangle, and typically with angle towers. There is no keep and frequently no distinct gatehouse. The quadrangular form predominantly dates from the mid to late fourteenth century and signals the transition from defensively to domestically oriented great houses. The four walls are also known as ranges.

Quadrangular castles typically display a sophisticated and complex approach to the planning of internal social spaces. There are many quadrangular castles around the UK, for example: Bodiam Castle in East Sussex, and Bolton Castle.

The 27 quadrangular castles identified by John Rickard as being built in England consist roughly 10% of the castles built in the country between 1272 and 1422. No castles of this design were built in Wales.

One of the earliest quadrangular castles in Germany is Neuleiningen, of which substantial ruins remain.

== List of quadrangular castles in the United Kingdom ==
Name	Location	Coordinates	Constructed	Built for	Designed by	Heritage status	Image
Beverston Castle	Cotswold	51.6442°N 2.20139°W	1225	Maurice de Gaunt; Thomas de Berkeley, 3rd Baron Berkeley	anonymous	Grade I listed building scheduled monument	
Bodiam Castle	East Sussex	51.00226°N 0.54353°E	1385	Edward Dalyngrigge	anonymous	Grade I listed building scheduled monument	
Bolton Castle	North Yorkshire	54.3221°N 1.94991°W	1379	Richard le Scrope, 1st Baron Scrope of Bolton	John Lewyn	Grade I listed building scheduled monument	
Caverswall Castle	Staffordshire Moorlands	52.9826°N 2.0746°W	1275	William de Caverswall	anonymous	Grade I listed building	
Cawood Castle	North Yorkshire	53.8313°N 1.1278°W	1378	John Kemp	anonymous	Grade I listed building scheduled monument	
Chideock Castle	Dorset	50.7343°N 2.81825°W	1370s	Sir John Chideock	anonymous	scheduled monument	
Chillingham Castle	Northumberland	55.526°N 1.905°W	1344	Sir Thomas Heton	anonymous	Grade I listed building	
Cooling Castle	Medway	51.4555°N 0.522732°E	1380s	John de Cobham, 3rd Baron Cobham	Henry Yevele	Grade I listed building scheduled monument	
Danby Castle	North Yorkshire	54.4555°N 0.895197°W	1302	William Latimer, 1st Lord Latimer	anonymous	Grade I listed building scheduled monument	
Farleigh Hungerford Castle	Somerset	51.3174°N 2.2869°W	1383	Thomas Hungerford	anonymous	Grade I listed building scheduled monument	
Ford Castle	Northumberland	55.6314°N 2.09025°W	1338	Sir William Heron	anonymous	Grade I listed building	
Fyvie Castle	Aberdeenshire	57.4433°N 2.3949°W	1300s	anonymous	anonymous	category A listed building	
Greys Court	South Oxfordshire	51.545°N 0.956164°W	1348	John de Grey, 1st Baron Grey de Rotherfield; Francis Knollys, 1st Viscount Knollys; Baron Lovel	anonymous	Grade I listed building scheduled monument	
Greystoke Castle	Westmorland and Furness	54.66998°N 2.87705°W	1353	William de Greystoke, 2nd Baron Greystoke	anonymous	Grade II* listed building	
Hartley Castle	Westmorland and Furness	54.4691°N 2.33655°W	1353	Thomas de Musgrave; Sir Richard Musgrave, 1st Baronet	anonymous	scheduled monument Grade II listed building	
Hemyock Castle	Mid Devon	50.9125°N 3.23156°W	1380	Margaret and William Asthorpe	anonymous	scheduled monument Grade II* listed building	
Hever Castle	Hever	51.186944°N 0.113889°E	1271	William de Hever	anonymous	Grade I listed building	
Inverlochy Castle	Highland	56.8326°N 5.081°W	1270s	Clan Cumming	anonymous	category B listed building	
Lumley Castle	County Durham	54.8547°N 1.55293°W	1389	Ralph de Lumley, 1st Baron Lumley	John Lewyn; John Vanbrugh	Grade I listed building	
Maxstoke Castle	Warwickshire	52.4994°N 1.67167°W	1345	William de Clinton, 1st Earl of Huntingdon	anonymous	Grade I listed building scheduled monument	
Moor End Castle	Northamptonshire	52.0949°N 0.900155°W	1347	Edward III of England; Thomas de Ferrers	anonymous	scheduled monument	
Raby Castle	County Durham	54.59092°N 1.80175°W	1378	House of Neville	John Lewyn	Grade I listed building	
Ravensworth Castle	Tyne and Wear	54.9262°N 1.6384°W	1350s	Marmaduke Lumley	anonymous	Grade II* listed building scheduled monument	
Sheriff Hutton Castle	North Yorkshire	54.0881°N 1.00519°W	1382	John Neville, 3rd Baron Neville de Raby	John Lewyn	Grade II* listed building scheduled monument	
Shirburn Castle	South Oxfordshire	51.6576°N 0.9938°W	1377	Warin de Lisle	Henry Yevele	Grade I listed building	
Somerton Castle	North Kesteven	53.1174°N 0.57616°W	1281	Antony Bek	anonymous	Grade I listed building scheduled monument	
Starborough Castle	Surrey	51.1783°N 0.0386396°E	1341	Reginald de Cobham, 1st Baron Cobham	anonymous	scheduled monument Grade II* listed building	
Sudeley Castle	Gloucestershire	51.5650°N 1.5722°W	1443	Ralph Boteler, 1st Baron Sudeley	anonymous	Grade I listed building	
Westenhanger Castle	Kent; Shepway	51.0944°N 1.03144°E	1343	John de Criol; Edward Poynings	anonymous	scheduled monument Grade I listed building	
Wingfield Castle	Mid Suffolk	52.3479°N 1.2614°E	1384	Michael de la Pole, 1st Earl of Suffolk	anonymous	Grade I listed building	
Woodcroft Castle	Cambridgeshire	52.6263°N 0.3172°W	1280	anonymous	anonymous	Grade II* listed building	
Woodsford Castle	Dorset	50.7126°N 2.34389°W	1336	William de Whitefield; Guy de Bryan, 1st Baron Bryan	anonymous	Grade I listed building	
Wressle Castle	East Riding of Yorkshire	53.7755°N 0.929291°W	1390s	Thomas Percy, 1st Earl of Worcester; Henry Percy, 5th Earl of Northumberland	John Lewyn	Grade I listed building scheduled monument	
