= Crazelowman =

Hamlet in mid Devon, England

Coordinates: 50.918°N 3.446°W

Crazelowman (Craze Lowman) is a hamlet in mid Devon, situated near the town of Tiverton and in that town's civil parish. It is situated to the north of the River Lowman, and further upstream, to the east, is Uplowman.
