= Uplowman =

Village and civil parish in Devon, England

Coordinates: 50°56′N 3°24′W

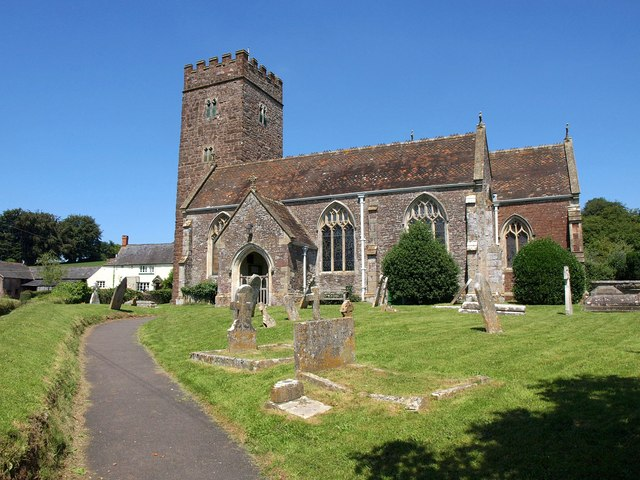
- St Peter's Church, Uplowman

- Location within Devon
- Population: 331 (2011 census)
- Civil parish: Uplowman
- District: Mid Devon
- Shire county: Devon
- Region: South West
- Country: England
- Sovereign state: United Kingdom

Uplowman (/ʌpˈloʊmən/) is a village and civil parish in the Mid Devon district, in Devon, England, situated about 4 miles north-east of the town of Tiverton. The parish is surrounded, clockwise from the north, by the parishes of Hockworthy, Sampford Peverell, Halberton, Tiverton, and Huntsham. It is situated near the River Lowman, and further downstream, to the west, is Crazelowman. In 2011 the parish had a population of 331.

== Notable buildings ==
- St Peter's parish church: the church was built in the 15th century by Margaret Beaufort, the mother of Henry VII. Features of interest include the 15th-century font and a peace window showing St Michael, St George and St Denys.
- Uplowman Court, 14th-century remnant of former manor house situated immediately to north of the church, rubble wall attached to east end of a farmhouse.
- Widhayes, a late 16th-century farmhouse refurbished in 1880.
- Spalsbury, late mediaeval farmhouse.
- Middlecombe, a classic 17th-century thatched farmhouse.
- Uplowman House, late 18th-century stuccoed house. Home to Denys Rhodes and Margaret Rhodes between 1952 and 1973, as a first cousin to Elizabeth II Margaret often hosted Her Majesty Queen Elizabeth The Queen Mother and Princess Margaret at the house over a weekend.
- The Redwoods Inn is a traditional public house.

== Sources ==
- Pevsner, Nikolaus & Cherry, Bridget, The Buildings of England: Devon, London, 2004, pp. 881–2
