= Loxbeare =

Village in Devon, England

Coordinates: 50.933941°N 3.55003°W

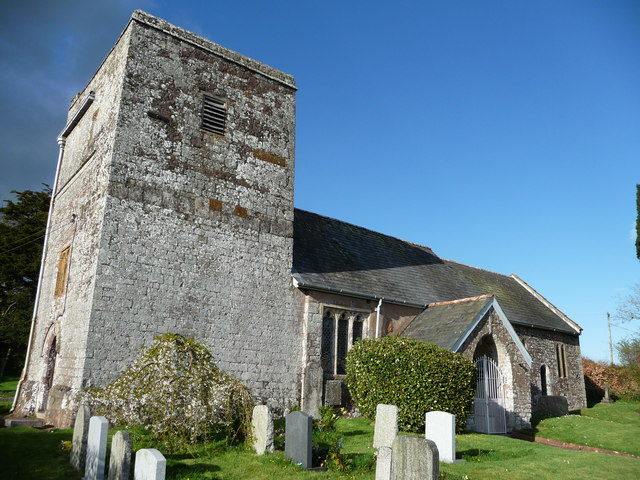
- Loxbeare, St Michael and All Angels Church

- Location within Devon
- Population: 162 (2011 UK Census)
- District: Mid Devon
- Shire county: Devon
- Region: South West
- Country: England
- Sovereign state: United Kingdom
- Police: Devon and Cornwall
- Fire: Devon and Somerset
- Ambulance: South Western
- UK Parliament: Tiverton and Minehead

Loxbeare is a village and civil parish in Devon, England. The church is from the twelfth century and the tower is probably Norman. It is dedicated to St Michael and All Angels and is a grade II* listed building.

In the Domesday Book of 1086, Loxbeare is recorded as Lochesbera.
