= Zeal Monachorum =

Village in Devon, England

Coordinates: 50.816667°N 3.816667°W

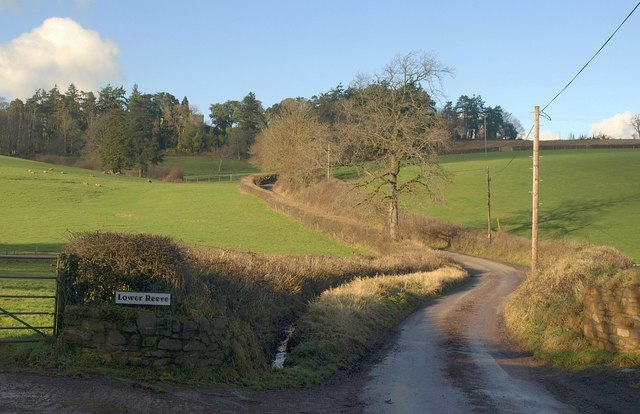
- Lane at Lower Burston, near Reeve Castle

- Location within Devon
- Population: 398 (2001 census)
- OS grid reference: SS7204003537
- Civil parish: Zeal Monachorum
- District: Mid Devon
- Shire county: Devon
- Region: South West
- Country: England
- Sovereign state: United Kingdom
- Post town: Crediton
- Postcode district: EX17
- Police: Devon and Cornwall
- Fire: Devon and Somerset
- Ambulance: South Western
- UK Parliament: Central Devon

Zeal Monachorum (/ziːl ˌmɒnəˈkɔːrəm/; Latin translation Cell of the Monks) is a village and civil parish in the Mid Devon district of Devon, England, about 18 miles (29 km) north-west of Exeter, situated on the River Yeo. According to the 2001 census, it had a population of 398. The village is in the electoral ward of Taw whose population at the 2011 Census was 1,660.

The parish of Zeal Monachorum covers an area of almost 3,400 acres (1370 hectares) at a height of 280 – 640 feet (85 – 195 metres) above sea level. It lies at the centre of Devon, situated between the A3072 Okehampton to Crediton road on the south and the B3220 Torrington to Morchard road on the north, about halfway between Crediton and Okehampton. The village itself is on the south-facing hillside of the Yeo valley looking towards Dartmoor.

The civil parish includes a number of hamlets such as East Leigh, Leigh Cross and Waie.

A mile to the south-west of the village is Reeve Castle, a large turreted house dated 1900 and restored from a ruinous state in the late twentieth century.

== History ==
In the Domesday Book (1086) the present parish of Zeal Monachorum consisted of four manors, Zeal Monachorum and Burston (both known as Limet, because of their proximity to the River Limet or Yeo), Newton and Loosebeare.

There is a local Saxon reference dated AD967 to land at Lesmanoac, and early maps refer to the settlement as Monkenfield, Munkton and Monks Nymet. The present name, written earlier as Sele and Zele, is said to derive from the fact that the manor of Zeal Monachorum had been given to the Abbey of Buckfast in 1018 by King Cnut (along with the manor of Down St Mary), hence a "cell of the monks" ("celle" in Old French and "cella" in Latin). The manor remained the property of Buckfast Abbey until the Dissolution of the Monasteries in 1539. The link with the Cistercian abbey is seen on the village sign at the top of Town Hill outside the church. The sale of the manor of Monckenzeale or Zealemonachorum is reported in documents of 1616.

In 1841 the parish covered over 3,000 acres (12 km^{2}) and had a population of about 600. The Lord of the manor owned nearly 500 acres (2.0 km^{2}), and other large estates included Beer, Sutton, the three Newtons, Burrow, Loosebeare, the Higher, Middle and Lower Burston, Barons Wood, Gillhouse, Foldhay, Higher Week, Serston, Nymphays, Waie and Tuckingmill. By 1901 the population had dropped to 316 and by the end of the First World War in which 19 members of the parish lost their lives, the population was 271.

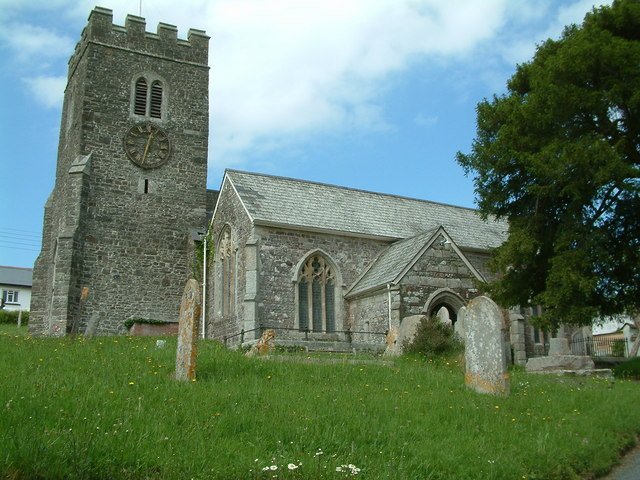
St Peter's church

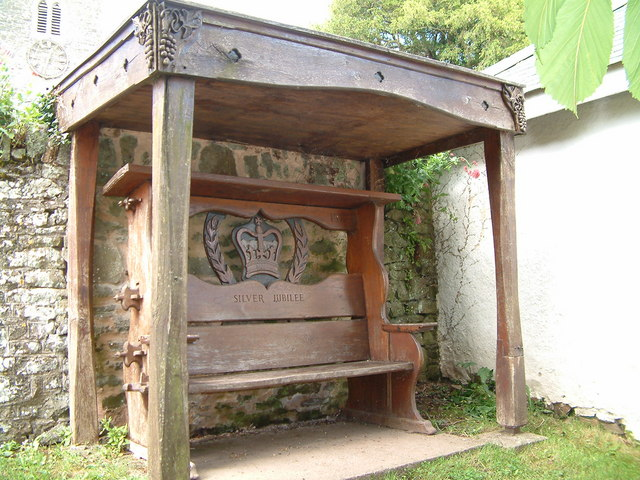
The silver jubilee seat

The parish church dedicated to St Peter the Apostle dates from 1235 with a late-Saxon font; in the churchyard is a yew tree reputed to be at least 1000 years old. The exterior of the tower dates from the early 16th century with a 13th-century interior still extant. It was originally one storey higher. Five of the present peal of six bells were cast in 1749 and the sixth was added in 1925. The Devon Association of Bellringers was founded at Zeal Monachorum in 1924. Ringing ceased in 1967 when the tower became unsafe. After strengthening and renovation, ringing began again in 1990. In 2005 a major restoration was undertaken, funded by a local appeal which raised over £30,000. The bells were rededicated on 18 August 2007. The church clock was also refurbished in 2007 with joint Devon County, Parish Council and Parochial Church Council funding.

There has also been an active Independent Congregational Chapel in the village since the late 19th century, with members of church and chapel attending each other's festive services. It is now closed and in private hands.

Regular community events are held in the village hall which is maintained and managed by a locally elected committee. The hall was originally a primary (public elementary) school which had 108 pupils in 1923 and many more during the Second World War when evacuees arrived, but it closed in 1954. The Church Hall was demolished in 1958, and the site is now a car park.
