= Crediton Hamlets =

Parish in Devon, England

Coordinates: 50.7735°N 3.7281°W

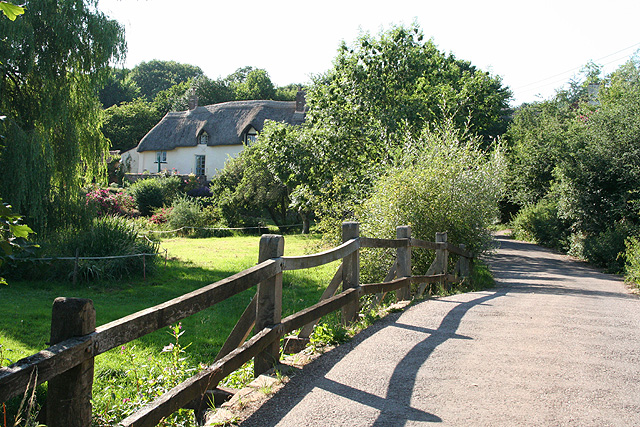
- Neopardy Mill

- Location within Devon
- Population: 1,307 (2001)
- OS grid reference: SX7898
- Civil parish: Crediton Hamlets
- District: Mid Devon
- Shire county: Devon
- Region: South West
- Country: England
- Sovereign state: United Kingdom
- Post town: CREDITON
- Postcode district: EX17
- Dialling code: 01363
- Police: Devon and Cornwall
- Fire: Devon and Somerset
- Ambulance: South Western
- UK Parliament: Central Devon

Crediton Hamlets is a civil parish in Mid Devon in the English county of Devon. It has a population of 1,307. The largest centre of population is Yeoford, and it extends southwards and westwards from the town of Crediton, which is a separate civil parish.
