= Kennerleigh =

Village in Devon, England

Coordinates: 50.8545°N 3.67803°W

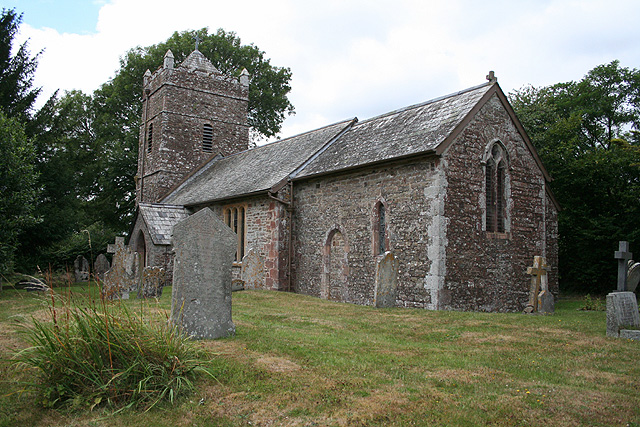
- Kennerleigh, St John the Baptist church

- Location within Devon
- Population: 145 (2011 UK Census)
- District: Mid Devon
- Shire county: Devon
- Region: South West
- Country: England
- Sovereign state: United Kingdom
- Post town: Crediton
- Police: Devon and Cornwall
- Fire: Devon and Somerset
- Ambulance: South Western
- UK Parliament: Central Devon

Kennerleigh is a village and civil parish in Devon, England.

The church is dedicated to St John the Baptist, which underwent significant restoration around 1847. There was previously a chapel dedicated to St. Clement which is first recorded in 1334.

The village, in ancient times known as Kynwarthlegh, was a parish of Crediton Hundred. Lords of the manor included members of the Hidon and Dowrich/Dowrish families.

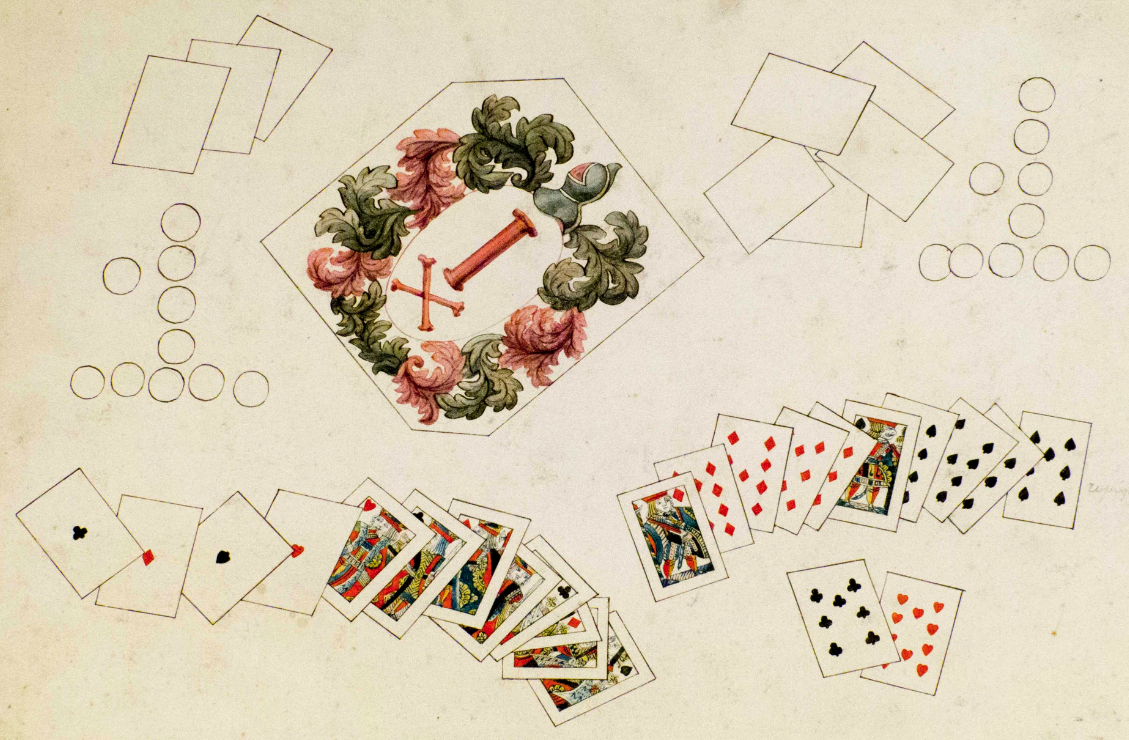
1855 drawing of the top of an inlaid table depicting two hands of a game of piquet on which the manor of Kennersleigh was lost by Thomas Dowrish in the 17th century. The losing hand is that at left, four aces, four kings, and four queens. Collection of Saltram House

Polwhele, in his "History of Devon" states that Thomas Dowrich sold the manor to John Northcote. According to tradition, however, memorialised in a family card table, he instead gambled away the manor to Sir Arthur Northcote, 2nd Baronet in a game of piquet. Sabine Baring-Gould describes the game in his 1898 book An Old English Home and its Dependencies:

Mr. Dowrish, being eldest hand, held the four aces, four kings, and four queens, and promptly offered to bet his manor of Kennerleigh against £500, by no means its value even in those days, that he won the game. Sir Arthur took the bet, having a claim of carte blanche on his undiscarded hand. After Sir Arthur had discarded, he took up two knaves, and held two points of five each, each headed by the knave. Mr. Dowrish being about to declare, was stopped by Sir Arthur's claim for ten for carte blanche, which ruined his chances. The point fell to Sir Arthur, and two quints.
