= Stoodleigh =

Village in Devon, England

Coordinates: 50.9595°N 3.5362°W

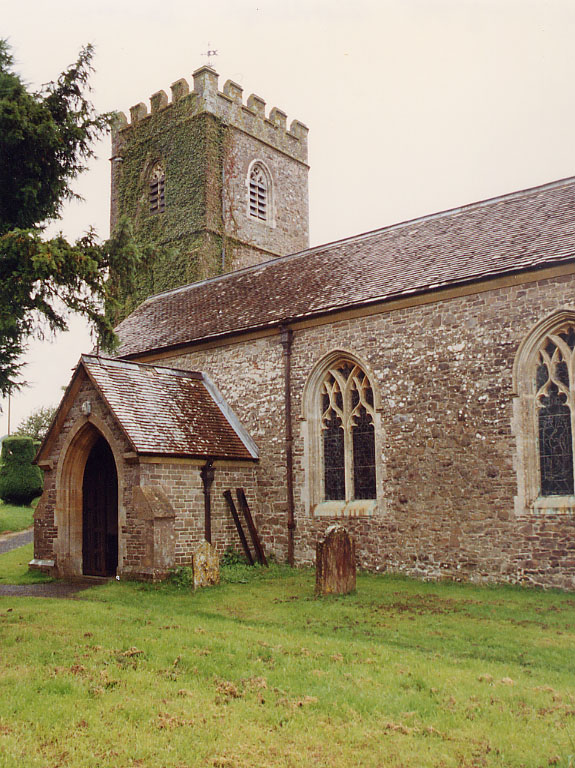
- Stoodleigh parish church

- Location within Devon
- OS grid reference: SS9218818980
- Civil parish: Stoodleigh
- District: Mid Devon
- Shire county: Devon
- Region: South West
- Country: England
- Sovereign state: United Kingdom
- Post town: TIVERTON
- Postcode district: EX16
- Dialling code: 01398
- Police: Devon and Cornwall
- Fire: Devon and Somerset
- Ambulance: South Western
- UK Parliament: Tiverton and Minehead

Stoodleigh is a village and civil parish in the Mid Devon district of Devon, England, located 6 miles (10 km) north of Tiverton and 5 miles (8 km) south of Bampton. It is situated 800 feet (240 m) above the Exe Valley, close to the Devon / Somerset border. The centre of the village is a conservation area.

In the past it formed part of Witheridge Hundred and it is within the Tiverton Deanery of the Church of England.

== Castle Close ==
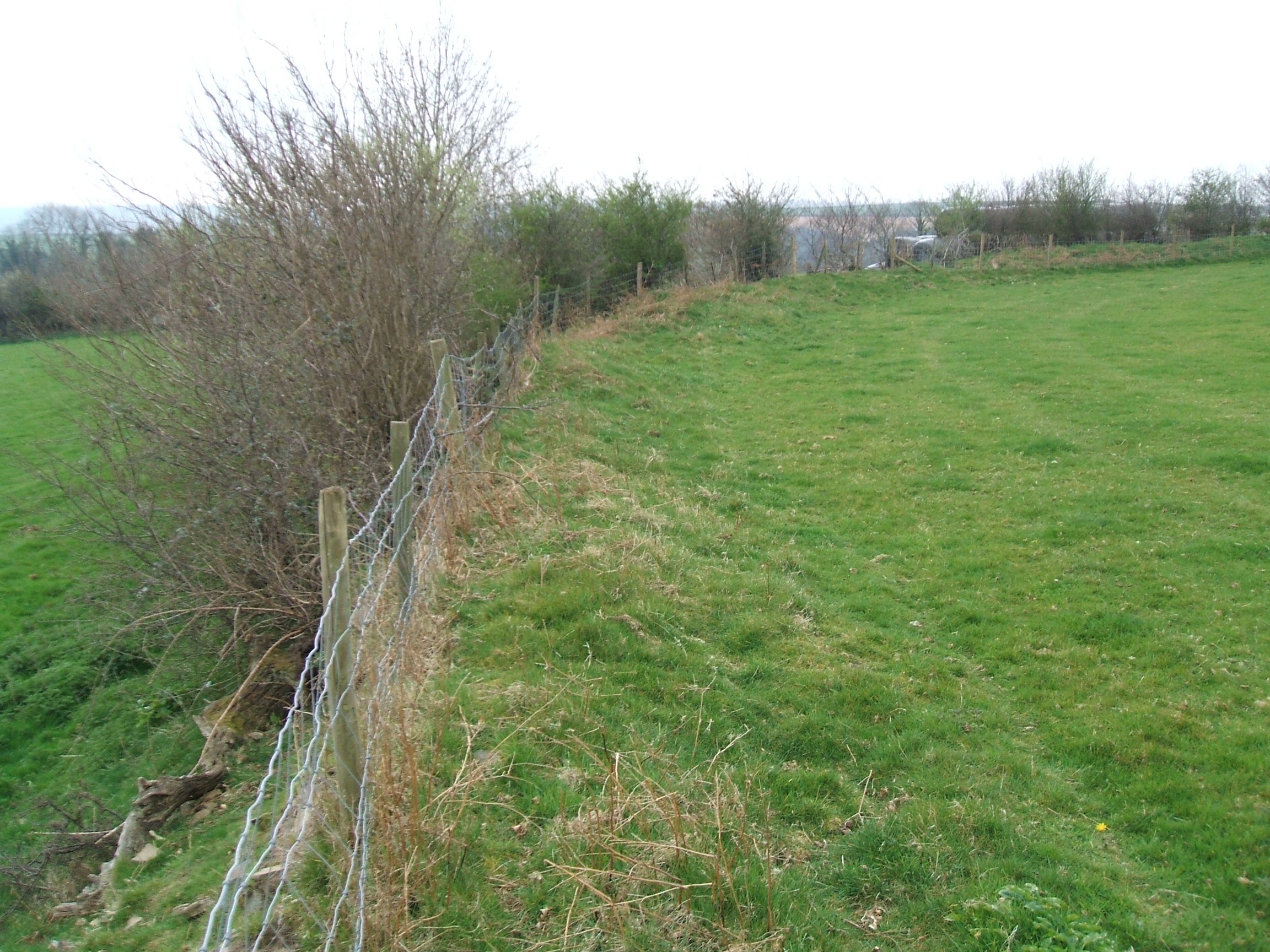
Castle Close

Castle Close is a circular earthwork, close to Stoodleigh, that is most likely to be an Iron Age Hill fort or enclosure.

== Church of St Margaret's ==
The Church of St Margaret's was constructed in the 15th century and was extensively restored in 1782. It contains a Norman font which is likely to have come from an earlier church in the parish where the first recorded incumbent was installed in 1264.

== Stoodleigh Beacon ==
Stoodleigh Beacon is situated about 2 miles west of Stoodleigh village. It was anciently known as Warbrighsleigh, Warbrightley, Warpsley, etc., also the name of the high hill on which it stood. The beacon was ordered to be set up by King Edward II (1307–1327) "when he doubted of the landing of his queen Isabel and Sir John (sic) of Henold" (Risdon) This refers to Isabel's Invasion of England in 1326, having betrothed her son Prince Edward to Philippa of Hainault, the daughter of William I, Count of Hainaut, from whom she received a substantial dowry and several warships. In the 16th and 17th centuries the estate of Warbrighsleigh, etc., was the seat of the Broughton family.
