= Cheriton Bishop =

Village in Devon, England

Coordinates: 50°44′N 3°44′W

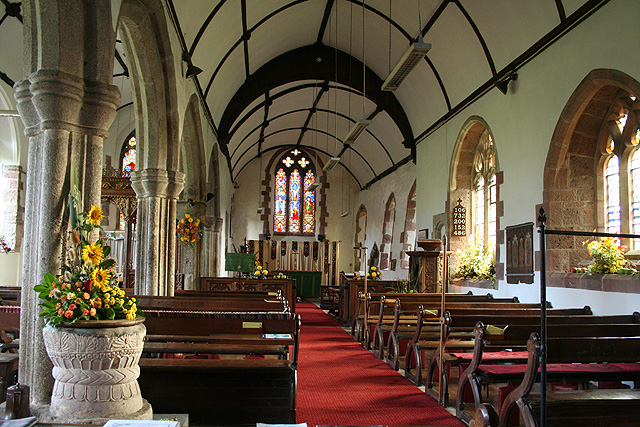
The interior of St Mary's church

Cheriton Bishop is a village and civil parish situated on the northern borders of Dartmoor National park between Exeter and Okehampton, within Mid Devon District, Devon, England. The population at the 2021 Census was 754. The history of the settlement can be traced back over a thousand years when the old village centre was established as a commercial centre for the local farming community.

== History ==
The name "Cheriton" derives from the Old English for "church town".

Treable is a farm in the parish which was first recorded in 1242. Treable is one of the few Celtic place names which survive in Devon; it means the "trev or homestead of Ebell". However it can with certainty be identified with an estate called "Hyple's old land" which was granted by King Edward in 976 to his vassal Aelfsige. "Hyple" is a corrupt form of "Ebell" and also occurs in Ipplepen; this suggests that this Celtic landowner had been in possession of this estate not long before, probably until earlier in the 10th century. The boundaries of the estate are described in the charter of 976 and include on the east a hollow way with two massive earth banks which is still in existence.

== Parish church ==
The church of St Mary has a 13th-century chancel but the remainder of the building is of the Perpendicular period. The west tower and north aisle are built of ashlar-granite. Features of interest include the old wagon roofs of the chancel, the Norman font, the old screen to the north chancel chapel and the 16th century pulpit.

== Present day ==
In the most recent census (2011), the village had a population of around 650. The village has a single public house, the Old Thatch Inn, remaining open, following the closure of the Mulberry (previously the Good Knight Inn) in September 2012. The site was purchased by the Young Farmers Club in 2013, becoming its regional hub. It was formally opened by Prince Charles in 2017. The village is served by a shop, doctor's surgery & primary school.
