= St George's Church, Tiverton =

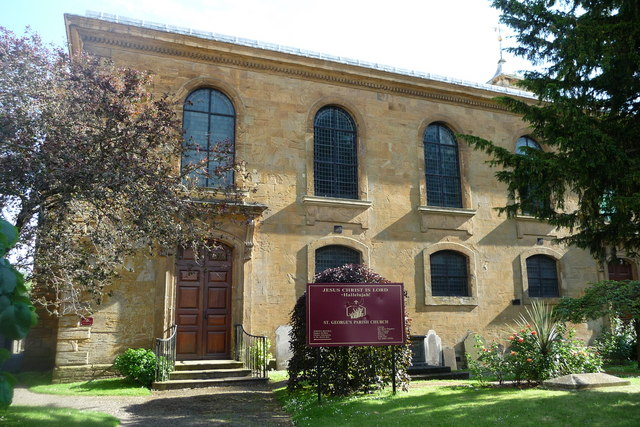
- St George's Church, Tiverton
- St George's Church, Tiverton
- 50°54′6.67″N 3°29′16.45″W
- OS grid reference: SS 95429 12460
- Location: Tiverton, Devon
- Country: England
- Denomination: Church of England
- Website: www.tivertonchurch.org

Architecture
- Architect: John James
- Groundbreaking: 1714
- Completed: 1733

Administration
- Diocese: Diocese of Exeter
- Archdeaconry: Exeter
- Deanery: Tiverton

St George's Church, Tiverton is a Grade I listed parish church in the Church of England in Tiverton, Devon.

== History ==
The church was constructed between 1714 and 1733. The architect was John James.

Nikolaus Pevsner describes the church as having an harmonious interior little disturbed by later alterations.

== Organ ==
The church organ is by Hele & Co. A specification of the organ can be found on the National Pipe Organ Register.
