= Shobrooke =

Village in Devon, England

Coordinates: 50.800381°N 3.606°W

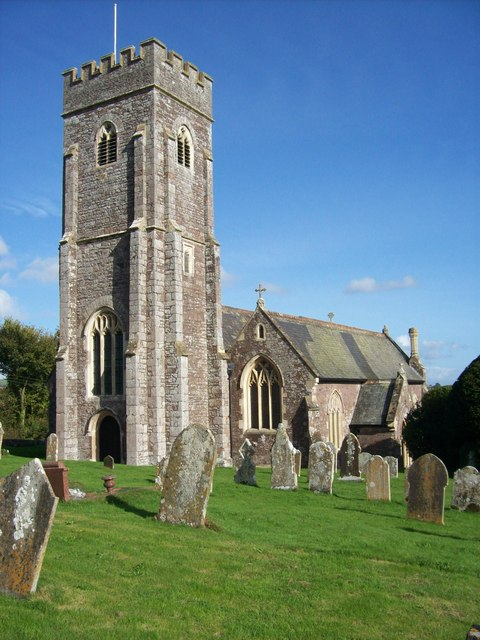
- St Swithun's Church, Shobrooke

- Location within Devon
- Population: 537 (2011 Census)
- OS grid reference: SS8665401327
- Civil parish: Shobrooke
- District: Mid Devon
- Shire county: Devon
- Region: South West
- Country: England
- Sovereign state: United Kingdom
- Post town: CREDITON
- Postcode district: EX17
- Dialling code: 01363
- Police: Devon and Cornwall
- Fire: Devon and Somerset
- Ambulance: South Western

Shobrooke is a village, parish and former manor in Devon, England. The village is situated about 1 1/2 miles north-east of Crediton. It is located close to Shobrooke park. The river Shobrooke Lake flows through the village. It had a population of 537 according to the 2011 census. The name Shobrooke is derived from the old English words of succa and brōc, and translates as goblin brook.

== History ==
Shobrooke has also been known as "Shobrook", the 1809 Ordnance Survey map refers the Parish and the village as Shobrook. Furthermore, in 1583 marriage records the village is once again referred to as Shobrook, it is not known if this was an error or the name of the village has evolved over time. The name itself has Anglo-Saxon origins, recorded in 938AD as Old English 'Sceocabroc' roughly translated as "Goblin brook" or "brook haunted by an evil spirit", this changed to Sotebroca in the Domesday book.

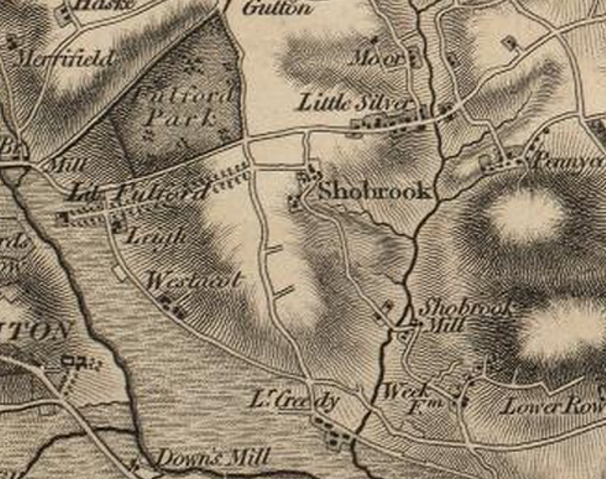
Ordnance Survey Map of Shobrooke from 1809.

In the 1870s, Shobrooke is described as:

A parish, with a village, in Crediton district, Devon; 2 miles NE of Crediton r. station. It has a post-office under Crediton, North Devon. Acres, 3835. Real property, £6,004. Pop. in 1851, 812; in 1861, 630. Houses, 133.

St. Swithun's Church is the oldest structure in the village, the church is of Anglo Saxon origins and was rebuilt in the 15th century, and restored further around 1840 and in 1879. The building has been Grade II listed since 1965. The Red Lion Inn is the last remaining pub in Shobrooke, the pub dates back to the 1580s making it one of the oldest structures in the village. The name of the Red Lion Inn has changed over time, in 1850 the pub was known as The Lion.

The Shobrooke 1914–1918 War Memorial holds the names of 25 men who lost their lives in World War I, the list includes the names of three brothers from the Horwell family, all three died within 15 months of one another.

== Population change and housing ==
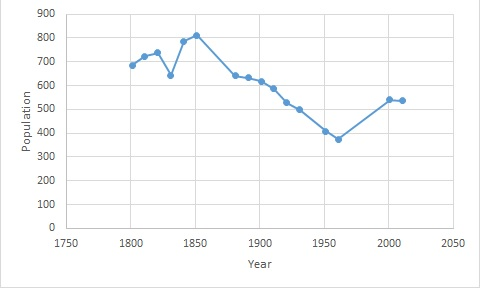
Total population of the Civil Parish of Shobrooke, as reported by the Census of Population 1881–2011

As of the 2011 Census Shobrooke has a population of 537, this is however down from the Parish population peak of 812 in the 1851 census. The population of the Parish has however been on a steady increase since the 1961 census when the population was just 375, this is an average increase in population of 2.7 persons per year.

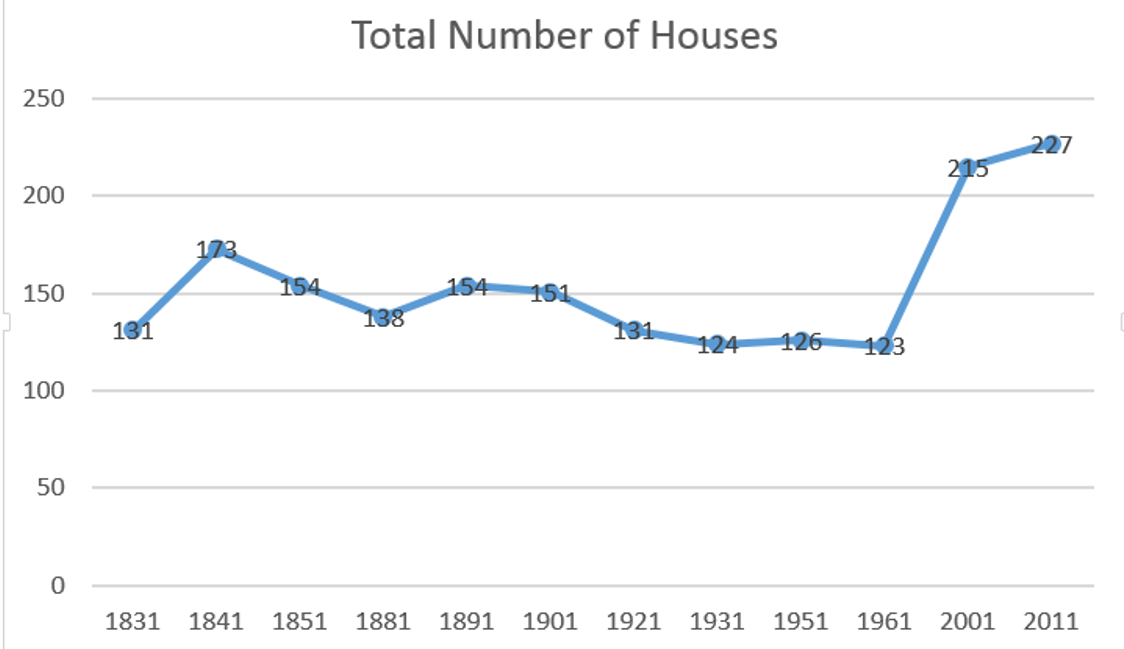
Housing change in the Parish of Shobrooke from 1831–2011.

The growth in the population between 1961 and 2001 can be explained through an increase in the number of houses in the Parish. The graph below shows that the number of houses in the Parish increased from 123 in 1961 to 215 in 2001. Over this period of time from 1831–2011 the overall number of houses in the Parish has increased by 96 properties.

== Occupation ==
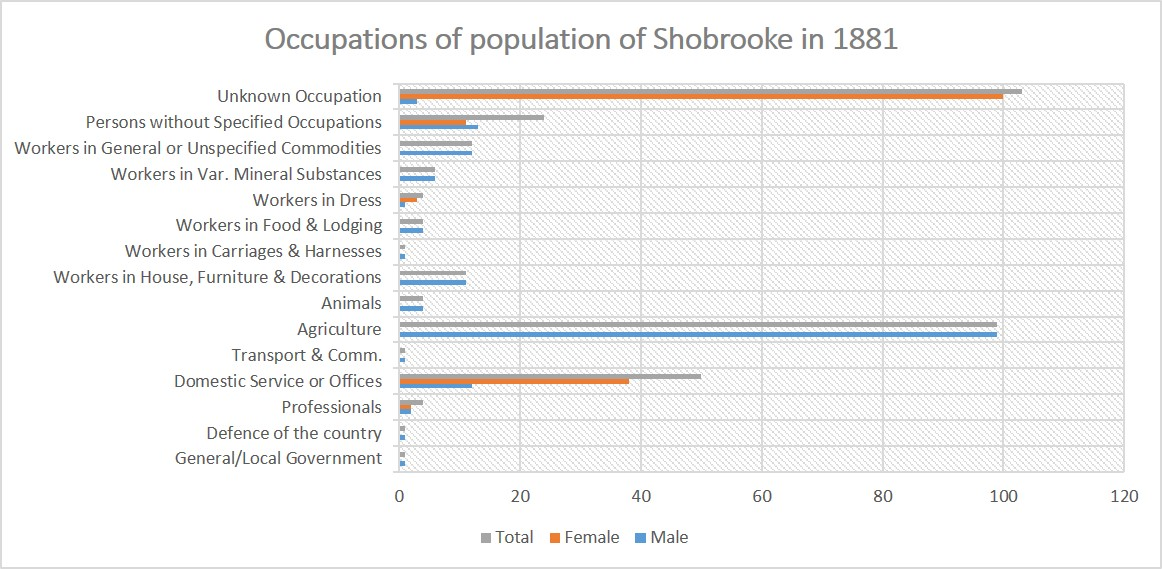
Graph showing the employment in the parish of Shobrooke in 1881.

Graph showing the employment data for Shobrooke in 2011.

When looking at the occupation structure of Shobrooke it is clear to see that in 1881 the majority of employment was in agriculture, with 104 out of 641 people. Other prominent areas of employment in the Parish were Domestic Services or Offices, which was the largest employment sector for women in the Parish with 38 people employed. It appears that unemployment in the village at the time based upon "Unknown Occupation" was 16.07%.

In comparison, in the 2011 census 19 people were employed in "Elementary Occupations" which includes agriculture, this 3.53% of the Parish population compared to 16.22% in 1881. In 2011 the largest employment sector was Professionals with 60 residents employed in this sector, this is followed by 41 people who described themselves as "Skilled Trades Person". In contrast to 1881 only 9 people in 2011 were unemployed, this is an unemployment rate of 1.67%.

== Historic estates and buildings ==
A number of historic estates exist in the Parish of Shobrooke. The most well known is that of Shobrooke Park also known as Little Fulford or Shobrooke House. According to local legend the name of Shobrooke Park was changed from Fulford Park due to a funeral director going to a different Fulford Park near Tedburn St Mary. Little Fulford served as a school during the Second World War for St Peter's Court, a preparatory school evacuated from Broadstairs, Kent, but burnt down in on 23 January 1945 with the loss of two pupils. The site was empty until 1975 when the present owner Sir John Richard Shelley, 11th Baronet built a new house on the land. There are currently 48 buildings and structures within the Parish that are on the Statutory List of Buildings of Special Architectural or Historic Interest.
