= Clayhanger, Devon =

Hamlet in Devon, England

Coordinates: 50.998245°N 3.39514°W

Clayhanger
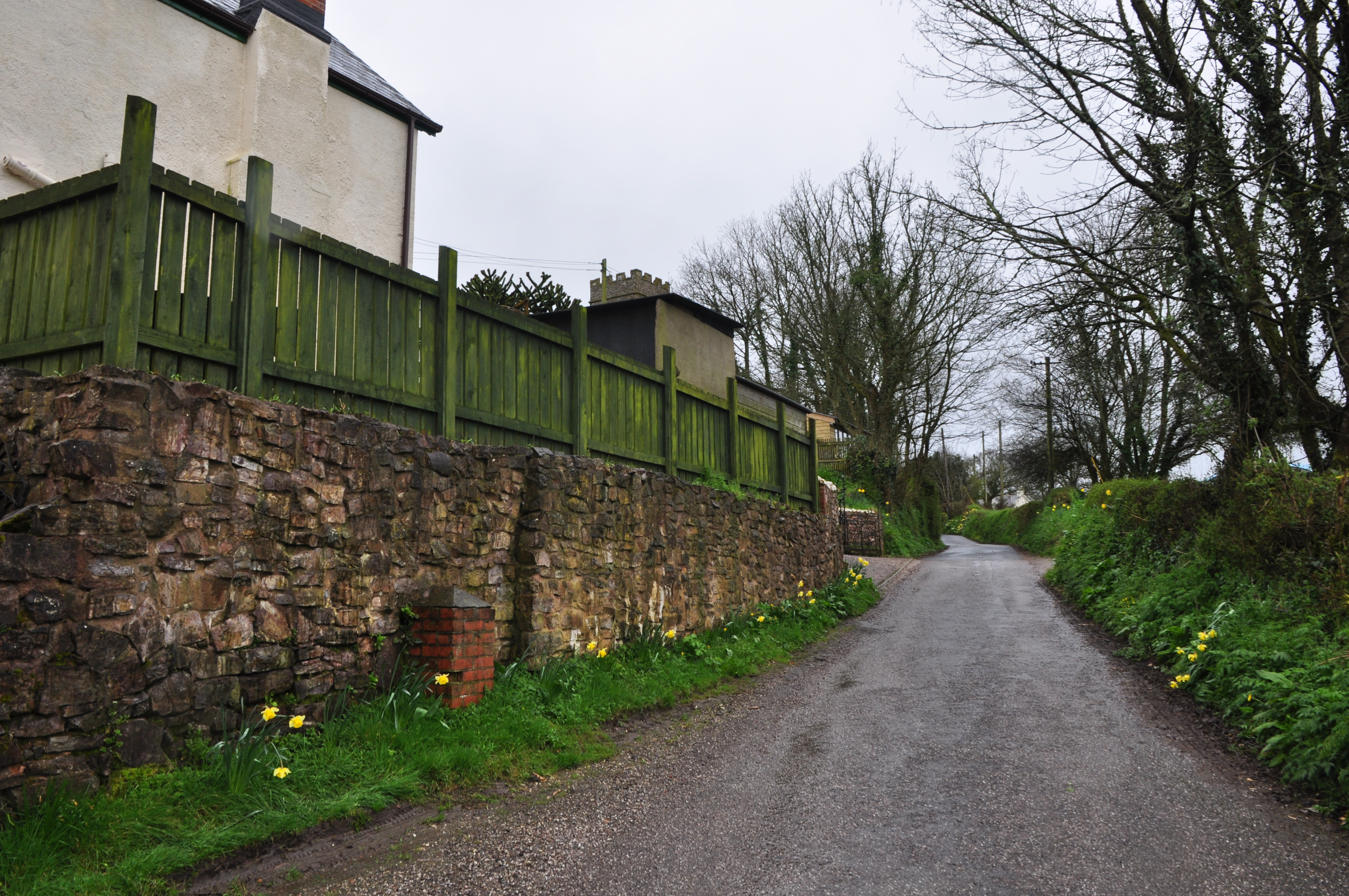
- A lane in the village

- Location within Devon
- Population: 127 (2011 UK Census)
- OS grid reference: ST022230
- District: Mid Devon
- Shire county: Devon
- Region: South West
- Country: England
- Sovereign state: United Kingdom
- Post town: TIVERTON
- Postcode district: EX16 7N
- Police: Devon and Cornwall
- Fire: Devon and Somerset
- Ambulance: South Western
- UK Parliament: Tiverton and Minehead

Clayhanger is a hamlet and civil parish in the Mid Devon district of Devon, England. At the time of the 2011 census it had a population of 127.

== Roman fort ==
Clayhanger is close to the site of a Roman fort at Cudmore Farm, overlooking a small tributary of the River Batherm, (although the fort mostly lies in the parish of Bampton). The site of the fort is a scheduled monument because it is still in a good condition and is considered to be the best surviving example in the south west of England. It is rectangular in shape and approximately 100 m across on each side, with an 8 m rampart and four outer ditches. Cropmarks inside the site probably show the locations of buildings from the period of the fort. Roman tile and samian ware have been recovered from the site.
