= Washford Pyne =

Village in Devon, England

Coordinates: 50.893299°N 3.6902°W

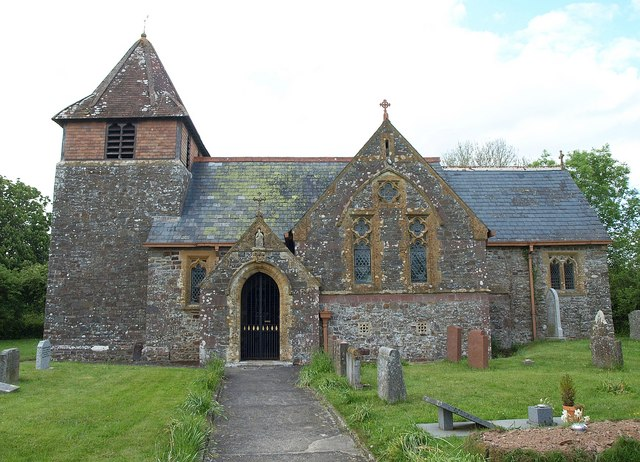
- Church of St Peter, Washford Pyne

- Location within Devon
- Population: 108 (2001 UK Census)
- District: Mid Devon
- Shire county: Devon
- Region: South West
- Country: England
- Sovereign state: United Kingdom
- Police: Devon and Cornwall
- Fire: Devon and Somerset
- Ambulance: South Western
- UK Parliament: Central Devon

Washford Pyne is a village and civil parish in Devon, England. It is 7 miles NE of Morchard Road railway station and 8 N by W of Crediton.

The local church is dedicated to Saint Peter and the base of the tower dates from the 15th century with the rest of the church rebuilt in 1882. It is a grade II* listed building.
