= Lapford =

Village in Devon, England

Coordinates: 50.866667°N 3.8°W

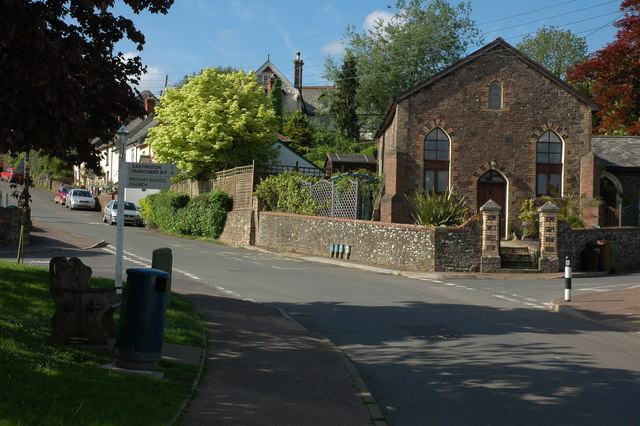
- Lapford

- Location within Devon
- Population: 990 (2021)
- OS grid reference: SS7308
- Civil parish: Lapford
- District: Mid Devon
- Shire county: Devon
- Region: South West
- Country: England
- Sovereign state: United Kingdom
- Post town: CREDITON
- Postcode district: EX17
- Dialling code: 01363
- Police: Devon and Cornwall
- Fire: Devon and Somerset
- Ambulance: South Western
- UK Parliament: Central Devon

Lapford is a village and civil parish in Mid Devon in the English county of Devon. It had a population of 993 in 2001, reducing to 867 at the 2011 census, and increasing to 990 in 2021. Lapford is part of Taw Valley ward whose population at the above census was 1,629.

== Churches ==
There are three churches in the village. St Thomas of Canterbury C of E church, Lapford Community Church and Lapford Congregational church.

Originally a Norman chapel, the church of St Thomas of Canterbury is listed Grade I and partly dates back to shortly after the murder of Thomas Becket (1170), having been almost completely rebuilt, extended and then re-dedicated on the orders of King Henry II by William de Tracey, one of the assassins. De Tracey was lord of the manor of Bradninch, which then included most of what is now Lapford. It was further rebuilt and extended in the 15th & 16th centuries. The wall paintings and plasterwork were lost at the time of the Reformation and the original 12th-century chancel was rebuilt in the late 19th century.

Of special interest is a very fine late 15th-century carved screen, uniquely carved on both sides, and still almost complete. Like many Devon churches, St Thomas' has a series of intricate carved pew ends, variously dating from the 14th, 15th and 16th centuries.

== The village ==
The nearby Bury Barton is the site of a Roman fort, thought to be a large pre-Flavian fort that was succeeded by a smaller one that in turn was abandoned early in the Flavian period.

In the early part of the 20th century the milk processing company Ambrosia had a large creamery and processing facility at Lapford.

There is one pub in the village. "The Old Malt Scoop Inn", located in the village centre, is an old coaching inn dating back to the 16th century.

Lapford playing field features two play areas, a large area of grass including a football pitch and also a fenced playground with various play equipment such as swings, slides and roundabouts.

Lapford railway station is a request stop station.

== Local legends ==
The village is said to be haunted by the spirit of the former Vicar of Lapford's church, the St Thomas of Canterbury Church, John Radford. He murdered his curate, in the 1860s, but was spared from the gallows by a jury consisting of many of his village parishioners and returned to his parish duties. His dying wish was to be buried in the church chancel, he made the ominous threat to haunt the village if his wishes were not carried out. The church authorities would not allow this, instead he was buried outside the vestry door where his grave can still be seen today. His spirit is said to still wander around the village.

Lapford is also said to be haunted by the spirit of the former Archbishop of Canterbury, Thomas Becket. On the anniversary of his murder he is said to gallop through the village on horseback on his way to confront Sir William de Tracey, of nearby Nymet Tracy, for his part in the brutal murder.

== Twin towns – sister cities ==
Lapford is twinned with:

- (France) - Grainville-Langannerie since 1975.
