= Clannaborough =

Village in Devon, England

Coordinates: 50.8089°N 3.7794°W

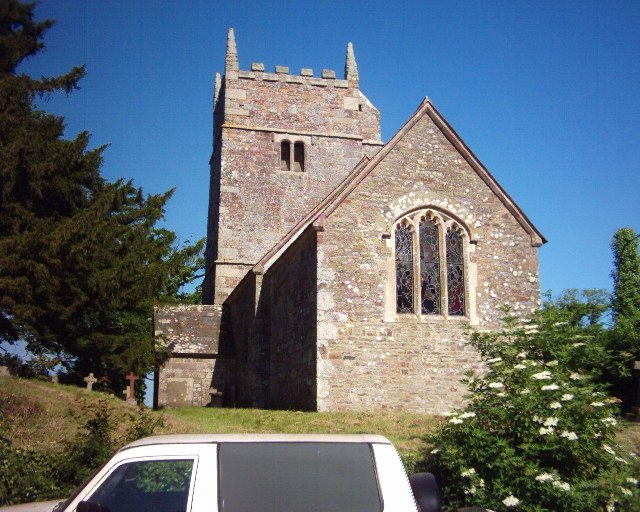
Clannaborough Church

Clannaborough is a parish in the county of Devon, England, situated about 5 1/2 miles north-west of the town of Crediton and 11 miles north-east of Okehampton. No village exists, only scattered farmhouses, including Clannaborough Barton and the bartons of Appledore and Walson, all three estates listed in the Domesday Book of 1066. Walson was the birthplace of Christopher Lethbridge (d.1670), Mayor of Exeter in 1660, who was lord of the manor of nearby Bow (alias Nymet Tracy). The parish church is dedicated to St Petrock.
