= Hockworthy =

Village in Devon, England

Coordinates: 50.966621°N 3.36809°W

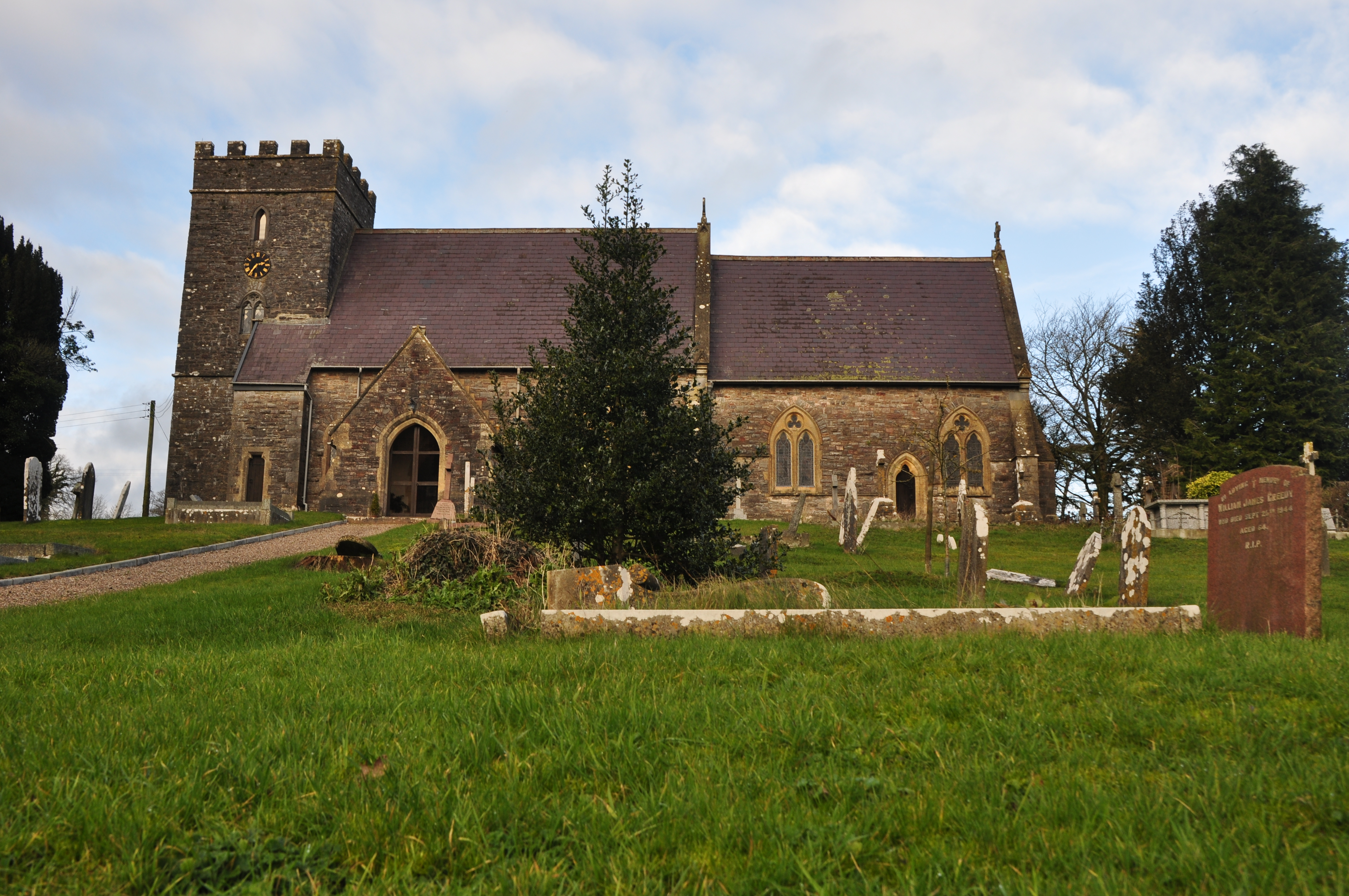
- St Simon and St Jude's church, Hockworthy

- Location within Devon
- Population: 174 (2011 UK Census)
- District: Mid Devon
- Shire county: Devon
- Region: South West
- Country: England
- Sovereign state: United Kingdom
- Police: Devon and Cornwall
- Fire: Devon and Somerset
- Ambulance: South Western
- UK Parliament: Tiverton and Minehead

Hockworthy is a village and civil parish in Devon, England. Its name is Old English and means "Hocca's enclosure". It has a church dedicated to St. Simon and St. Jude which was mostly rebuilt in 1865, and contains a Norman font.
