= Cheriton Fitzpaine =

Village in Devon, England

Coordinates: 50.8438°N 3.61006°W

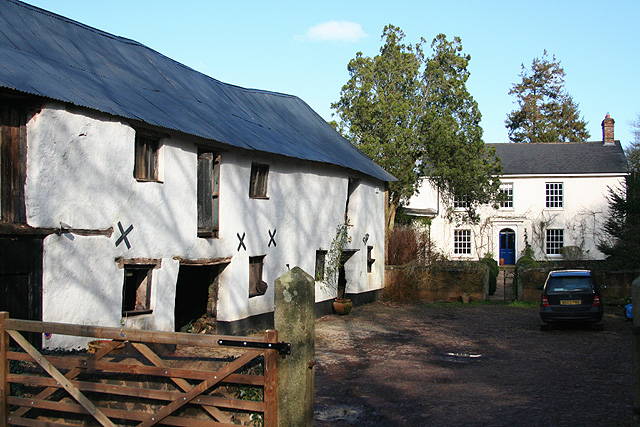
- Cheriton Mill

- Location within Devon
- Population: 556
- OS grid reference: SS867061
- District: Mid Devon
- Shire county: Devon
- Region: South West
- Country: England
- Sovereign state: United Kingdom
- Post town: Crediton
- Postcode district: EX17
- Dialling code: 01363
- Police: Devon and Cornwall
- Fire: Devon and Somerset
- Ambulance: South Western
- UK Parliament: Central Devon

Cheriton Fitzpaine is a village in Devon, England, located 4 miles (7 km) north-east of Crediton. The population of the parish in the 2011 Census was 556.

The village is noted for its historic buildings, including the old Primary School, the longest thatched house in England. Cheriton Fitzpaine is a major part of the electoral ward Way, with a 2011 population of 1,603.

== History ==
The settlement's two part name is derived from the Old English phrase Cheriton, cirice+tun, which means "village with a church". The Fitzpaine part comes from the Fitzpayn family, who were prominent landholders in the parish in the 13th century.

== Local amenities ==
Cheriton Fitzpaine has two pubs: The Half Moon Inn, and The Ring of Bells, which have been serving the village for more than 150 years, and are mentioned in the directories of Kelly 1893 and Whites of 1850.

Jacks Acre is a large field maintained by the parish council, open to public use for leisure activities, such as the annual Wassail and sports activities. The parish council also maintains an under-elevens playground, situated just off the main street.

Cheriton Fitzpaine Community Shop, run largely by volunteers, is the only shop in the village.

Thorne's Farm Shop is a local farm shop placed on the outskirts, which serves local produce and a cafe.

Cheriton Fitzpaine Parish Hall is used by a number of local groups to host activities and events.

== Historic buildings ==
Cheriton Fitzpaine features numerous historic buildings, with many homes originating as early as the fifteenth century.

The original primary school building dates back to 1642 and is the oldest thatched longhouse in England, its former use is believed to have been as the church house. In 1875 a school board was formed and the school started, with the local attendance officer as clerk of the board. The addition of the school house to the teaching space in 1983 accommodated growing numbers, as well as providing space for an outdoor swimming pool. The school campaigned for a new building, beginning with a pupil letter-writing exercise in 1998, where students wrote to Downing Street and received a reply, which can be read on the school's website. Work began on the new school from September 2009 until October 2010, officially opening in November 2010.

Upcott Barton, about 1.5 miles (2.4 km) north of Cheriton Fitzpaine, is a mediaeval Grade II* listed house, the home of a fifteenth-century lawyer, Nicholas Radford, who, in 1455 during the Wars of the Roses, was murdered by a mob directed by the Earl of Devon.

Other historic buildings include the Church of St Matthew, a Gothic-style Church of England church, and an almshouse which dates from 1594.

== Sports ==
The village had its own football club and a cricket club. The Cheriton Fitzpaine Cricket Club previously held the world record for the world's longest cricket marathon at 27 hours 34 minutes on 24–25 June 2006, and was held for 11 months until it was surpassed by Red Row Cricket Club from Northumberland, England in May 2007. The Club plays host to the annual Mid-Devon Twenty 20 Competition, colloquially known by some as the Cheriton Fitzpaine Girt Big Bash.

== Notable residents ==
The writer Jean Rhys spent the last years of her life (1960-1979) in the village.
