= Coldridge =

Village in Devon, England

Coordinates: 50.853359°N 3.85166°W

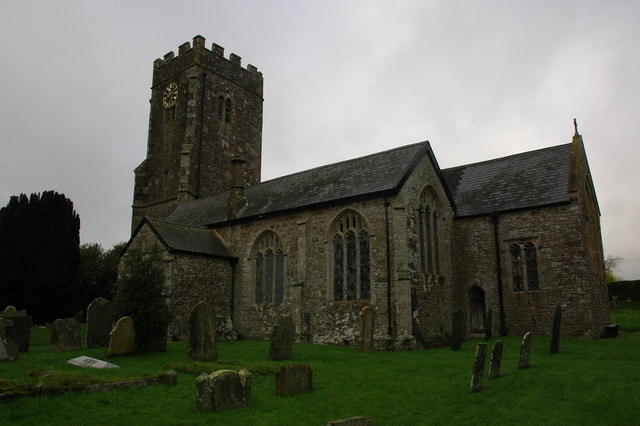
- St Matthew's Church, Coldridge

- Location within Devon
- Population: 498 (2011 UK Census)
- District: Mid Devon
- Shire county: Devon
- Region: South West
- Country: England
- Sovereign state: United Kingdom
- Post town: Crediton
- Police: Devon and Cornwall
- Fire: Devon and Somerset
- Ambulance: South Western
- UK Parliament: Central Devon

Coldridge or Coleridge is a village and parish in central Devon, England. It appears in the Domesday Book of 1086 as Colrige, which is thought to mean ‘the ridge where charcoal is made’. It has a church dedicated to St Matthew dating from the 15th and early 16th century which is a Grade I listed building.

In 2021, investigations started as to whether John Evans, a medieval lord of the manor buried in the church, may in reality have been the missing Edward V, one of the princes in the Tower, whose mother Elizabeth Woodville travelled to Devon in 1484 and whose son Thomas Grey owned land at Coldridge. The church contains an unusual stained glass portrait of Edward V, and other alleged clues. The investigations have been set up by writer and historian Philippa Langley, and follow suggestions originally made in the 1920s by local historian Beatrix Cresswell.

Facebook incorrectly identifies Coldridge as being located in Somerset rather than Devon, though the map correctly shows it is actually in Devon.
