= Morchard Bishop =

Village in Devon, England

Coordinates: 50.85°N 3.75°W

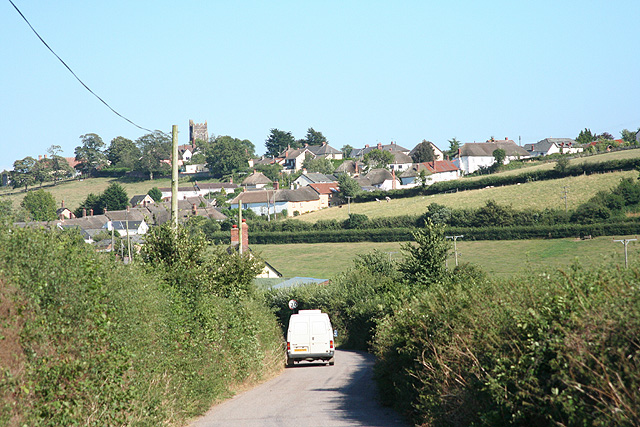
- Morchard Bishop

- Location within Devon
- Population: 1,041 (2021)
- OS grid reference: SS7607
- Civil parish: Morchard Bishop
- District: Mid Devon
- Shire county: Devon
- Region: South West
- Country: England
- Sovereign state: United Kingdom
- Post town: CREDITON
- Postcode district: EX17
- Dialling code: 01363
- Police: Devon and Cornwall
- Fire: Devon and Somerset
- Ambulance: South Western
- UK Parliament: Central Devon

Morchard Bishop is a village and civil parish in Mid Devon in the English county of Devon. It has a population of 975, and contains a primary school, two churches, and a playing field with tennis court. Notable past residents include Ernest Bevin and John Fellowes Wallop, 7th Earl of Portsmouth.

== Etymology ==
The name Morchard is first attested in the Domesday Book of 1086, in the forms Morchet and Morcheta. It is derived from the Common Brittonic words mǭr ("big") and cę̃d ("wood") (corresponding to modern Welsh mawr coed; thus it once meant "large wood". The affix of Bishop, first attested as part of the place-name in 1207, is from the settlement's possession by the Bishop of Exeter, itself first attested in 1086, and to distinguish the settlement from the nearby Cruwys Morchard.

== Characteristics ==
Morchard Bishop is twinned with Saint-Gatien-des-Bois in Normandy. It has a garage, a post office, a pub called The London Inn, a surgery, a blacksmith and its own woodland. It is about 8 miles (13 km) from the market town of Crediton. Community events include: a village pantomime, an allotment association, a ukulele band and football teams.
