= Mid Devon =

Coordinates: 50.900°N 3.490°W

Mid Devon District
- Non-metropolitan district
- Coat of arms

- Mid Devon shown within Devon
- Sovereign state: United Kingdom
- Constituent country: England
- Region: South West England
- Non-metropolitan county: Devon
- Status: Non-metropolitan district
- Admin HQ: Tiverton
- Formed: 1 April 1974

Government
  - Type: Non-metropolitan district council
  - Body: Mid Devon District Council
  - MPs: Richard Foord; Rachel Gilmour; Mel Stride

Area
  - Total: 352.5 sq mi (912.9 km^{2})
  - Rank: 32nd (of 296)

Population (2024)
  - Total: 84,993
  - Rank: 276th (of 296)
  - Density: 241.1/sq mi (93.10/km^{2})
  - Ethnicity: 97.8% White (93.8% White British)
- Time zone: UTC0 (GMT)
  - Summer (DST): UTC+1 (BST)
- ONS code: 18UD (ONS); E07000042 (GSS)
- OS grid reference: SS9523512287

Mid Devon is a local government district in Devon, England. The council is based in the district's largest town of Tiverton. The district also contains the towns of Bampton, Bradninch, Crediton and Cullompton, along with numerous villages and surrounding rural areas. Part of the district lies within the Blackdown Hills, an Area of Outstanding Natural Beauty.

The neighbouring districts are East Devon, Teignbridge, West Devon, Torridge, North Devon and Somerset.

== History ==
The district was formed on 1 April 1974 under the Local Government Act 1972, covering the area of four former districts which were all abolished at the same time:

- Crediton Rural District
- Crediton Urban District
- Tiverton Municipal Borough
- Tiverton Rural District

The new district was initially named Tiverton, after its largest town. The district was renamed Mid Devon with effect from 6 February 1978 by resolution of the district council.

Under current local government restructuring plans it is planned that the district will be abolished in 2028, with six parishes becomine part of an Exeter unitary authority and the remainder forming part of a new Devon unitary.

== Geography ==
Mid Devon shares borders with several other Devon districts as well as the county of Somerset. Neighbouring districts include Exeter, East Devon, North Devon, Teignbridge, West Devon and Torridge. The area of Mid Devon, according to the Office for National Statistics Census table KS101EW is 91293.48 hectares, or 912.9348 sq kilometres, or 352.5 square miles.

=== Rivers ===
The Exe, the Culm, the Yeo, the Dalch, the Little Dart, the Taw, the Dart, the Brockley, the Creedy and the Spratford Stream flow through the district.

=== Raddon Top ===
Raddon Top (772 ft) is the highest point of the Raddon Hills. Excavations at the summit in 1994 uncovered traces of Early Iron Age settlement.

== Governance ==
Mid Devon District Council

Type
- Type: Non-metropolitan district council

History
- Founded: 1 April 1974

Leadership
- Chair: Gordon Czapiewski, Liberal Democrat since 7 May 2025
- Leader: David Wulff, Liberal Democrat since 6 May 2026
- Chief Executive: Stephen Walford since 2016

Structure
- Seats: 42 councillors
- Graph of the party split among 42 seats.
- Political groups: Administration (34) Liberal Democrats (34) Other parties (8) Conservative (3) Green (3) Independent (2)

Elections
- Voting system: Plurality-at-large
- Last election: 4 May 2023

Meeting place
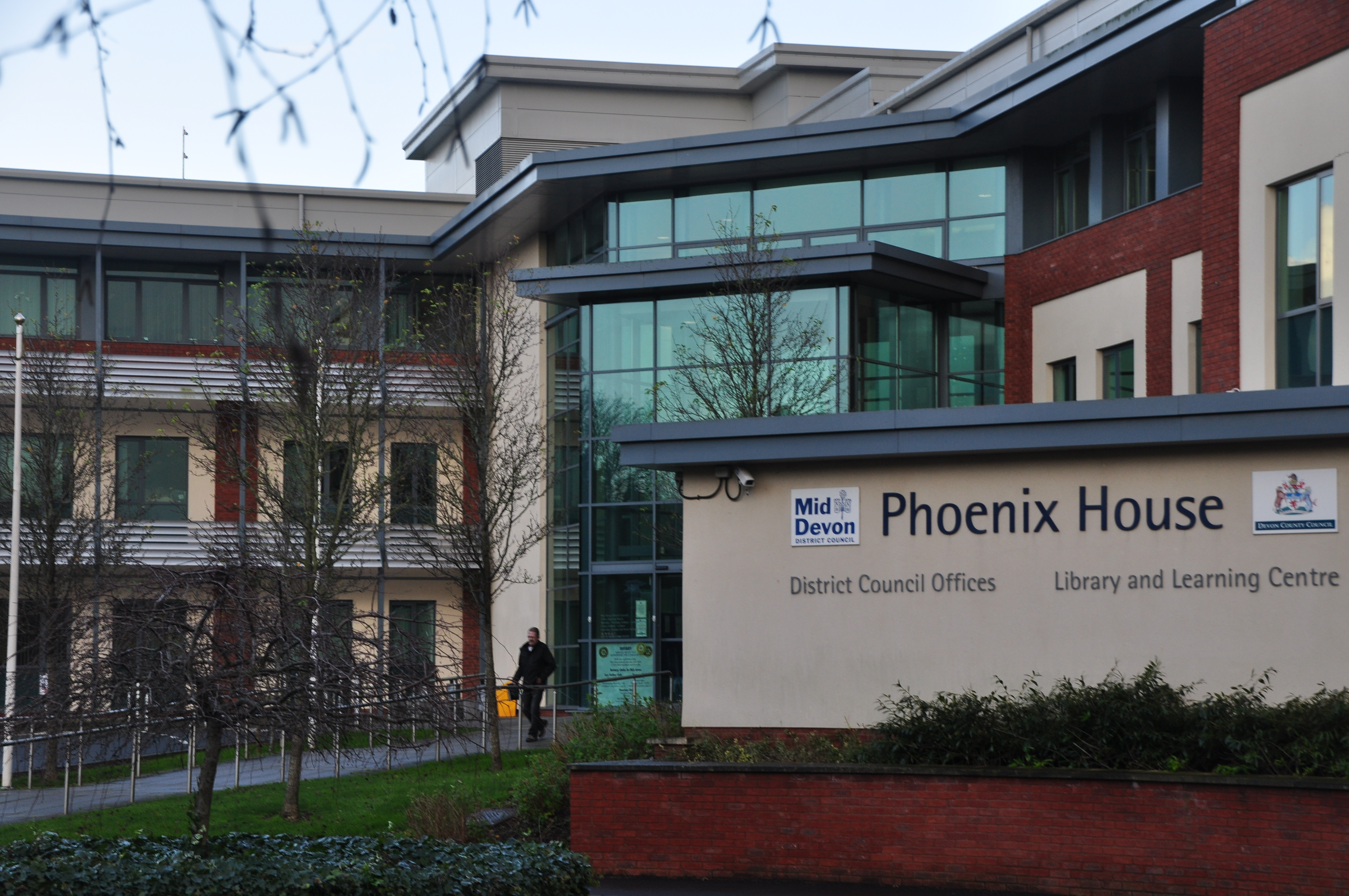
- Phoenix House, Phoenix Lane, Tiverton, EX16 6PP

Website
- www.middevon.gov.uk

Constitution
- The Constitution of Mid Devon District Council

Mid Devon District Council provides district-level services. County-level services are provided by Devon County Council. The whole district is also covered by civil parishes, which form a third tier of local government.

=== Political control ===
The council has been under Liberal Democrat majority control since the 2023 election.

The first election to the council was held in 1973, initially operating as a shadow authority alongside the outgoing authorities until the new arrangements came into effect on 1 April 1974. Political control of the council since 1974 has been as follows:

Party in control	Years
Independent	1974–1995
Liberal Democrats	1995–1999
No overall control	1999–2023
Liberal Democrats	2023–present

=== Leadership ===
The leaders of the council since 2008 have been:

Councillor	Party	From	To
Peter Hare-Scott	Conservative	May 2008	29 Oct 2014
Clive Eginton	Conservative	29 Oct 2014	May 2019
Bob Deed	Independent	22 May 2019	22 Feb 2023
Barry Warren	Independent	22 Feb 2023	May 2023
Luke Taylor	Liberal Democrats	24 May 2023	6 May 2026
David Wulff	Liberal Democrats	6 May 2026	

=== Composition ===
Following the 2023 election, and subsequent by-elections and changes of allegiance up to June 2026, the composition of the council was:

Party	Councillors
Liberal Democrats	34
Conservative	3
Green	3
Independent	2
Total	42

=== Elections ===
Since the last boundary changes in 2023 the council has comprised 42 councillors, representing 22 wards, with each ward electing one, two or three councillors. Elections are held every four years.

=== Premises ===
Since January 2004 the council has been based at a modern office building called Phoenix House on Phoenix Lane in Tiverton.

== Tourism ==
=== Grand Western Canal ===
The Grand Western Canal stretches from Canal Hill in Tiverton to just before the county boundary, near to Greenham, Somerset. It no longer operates for trade purposes, but is a popular tourist location. Visitors are able to walk along its banks or take a trip down the canal in a horse drawn barge. A static barge at the Canal Hill end of the canal offers refreshments. The site is one of two tourism spots owned by Devon County Council.

=== Devon Railway Centre ===
The Devon Railway Centre is located at Bickleigh in Mid Devon, in a restored Victorian railway station on the closed Great Western Railway branch from Exeter to Dulverton. The centre operates a 2 ft (610mm) gauge passenger railway and has a large collection of narrow gauge rolling stock, a miniature railway and a collection of model railways.

=== Coldharbour Working Wool Museum ===
Coldharbour Mill is a Grade II* listed Georgian mill complex in Uffculme, close to junction 27 (Tiverton turnoff) of the M5. The mill has the largest working waterwheel in the south west, and steams up its stationary steam engines most Bank Holidays. It has a number of other collections, such as dolls' houses, a large tapestry showing five local parishes, and a wide range of worsted wool spinning and weaving machines.

== Towns and parishes ==
Mid Devon is entirely divided into civil parishes. Some of the smaller parishes have a parish meeting rather than a parish council, whilst the three parishes of Clayhanger, Hockworthy and Huntsham share a grouped parish council called Borden Gate Parish Council. The parish councils for Bampton, Bradninch, Crediton, Cullompton and Tiverton take the style "town council".

== See also ==
- Grade I listed buildings in Mid Devon
- Grade II* listed buildings in Mid Devon
