= List of civil parishes in Devon =

This is a list of civil parishes in the ceremonial county of Devon, England. There are 426 civil parishes.

Blank map of civil parish boundaries in Devon

== East Devon ==
Image	Name	Status	Population	Former local authority	Refs
	All Saints	Civil Parish	498	Axminster Rural District	
	Awliscombe	Civil Parish	507	Honiton Rural District	
	Axminster	Town	5,626	Axminster Rural District	
	Axmouth	Civil Parish	493	Axminster Rural District	
	Aylesbeare	Civil Parish	527	St Thomas Rural District	
	Beer	Civil Parish	1,381	Axminster Rural District	
	Bicton	Civil Parish	280	St Thomas Rural District	
	Brampford Speke	Civil Parish	307	St Thomas Rural District	
	Branscombe	Civil Parish	513 (2009 est.)	Honiton Rural District	
	Broadclyst	Civil Parish	2,830	St Thomas Rural District	
	Broadhembury	Civil Parish	654	Honiton Rural District	
	Buckerell	Civil Parish	270	Honiton Rural District	
	Budleigh Salterton	Town	4,805	Budleigh Salterton Urban District	
	Chardstock	Civil Parish	838 (2009)	Axminster Rural District	
	Clyst Honiton	Civil Parish	316 (2009)	St Thomas Rural District	
	Clyst Hydon	Civil Parish	305 (2009)	St Thomas Rural District	
	Clyst St George	Civil Parish	768 (2009)	St Thomas Rural District	
	Clyst St Lawrence	Civil Parish	99 (2009)	St Thomas Rural District	
	Clyst St Mary	Civil Parish	642 (2004)	St Thomas Rural District	
	Colaton Raleigh	Civil Parish	669 (2009)	St Thomas Rural District	
	Colyford	Civil Parish		Axminster Rural District	
	Colyton	Civil Parish	3,206 (2009)	Axminster Rural District	
	Combe Raleigh	Civil Parish	234 (2009)	Honiton Rural District	
	Combpyne Rousdon	Civil Parish	335 (2009)	Axminster Rural District	
	Cotleigh	Civil Parish	232 (2009)	Honiton Rural District	
	Cranbrook	Town	6,743	St Thomas Rural District	
	Dalwood	Civil Parish	417 (2009)	Axminster Rural District	
	Dunkeswell	Civil Parish	1,622 (2009)	Honiton Rural District	
	East Budleigh	Civil Parish	819 (2009)	St Thomas Rural District	
	Exmouth	Town	32,972	Exmouth Urban District	
	Farringdon	Civil Parish	356 (2009)	St Thomas Rural District	
	Farway	Civil Parish	248 (2009)	Honiton Rural District	
	Feniton	Civil Parish	1,796	Honiton Rural District	
	Gittisham	Civil Parish	587 (2009)	Honiton Rural District	
	Hawkchurch	Civil Parish	535 (2009)	Axminster Rural District	
	Honiton	Town	11,634 (2009)	Honiton Municipal Borough	
	Huxham	Civil Parish	99 (2009)	St Thomas Rural District	
	Kilmington	Civil Parish	839 (2009)	Axminster Rural District	
	Lands common to Axminster and Kilmington	shared territory	0	Axminster Rural District	
	Luppitt	Civil Parish	488 (2009)	Honiton Rural District	
	Lympstone	Civil Parish	1,754	St Thomas Rural District	
	Membury	Civil Parish	544 (2009)	Axminster Rural District	
	Monkton	Civil Parish	177 (2009)	Honiton Rural District	
	Musbury	Civil Parish	550 (2009)	Axminster Rural District	
	Nether Exe	Civil Parish	39 (2009)	St Thomas Rural District	
	Newton Poppleford and Harpford	Civil Parish	2,128 (2009)	St Thomas Rural District	
	Northleigh	Civil Parish	139 (2009)	Honiton Rural District	
	Offwell	Civil Parish	432 (2009)	Honiton Rural District	
	Otterton	Civil Parish	660 (2009)	St Thomas Rural District	
	Ottery St Mary	Town	7,692	Ottery St Mary Urban District	
	Payhembury	Civil Parish	708 (2009)	Honiton Rural District	
	Plymtree	Civil Parish	614 (2009)	Honiton Rural District	
	Poltimore	Civil Parish	297 (2011)	St Thomas Rural District	
	Rewe	Civil Parish	420 (2009)	St Thomas Rural District	
	Rockbeare	Civil Parish	998 (2009)	St Thomas Rural District	
	Seaton	Town	7,111 (2004)	Seaton Urban District	
	Sheldon	Civil Parish	191 (2009)	Honiton Rural District	
	Shute	Civil Parish	608 (2009)	Axminster Rural District	
	Sidmouth	Town	14,400	Sidmouth Urban District	
	Southleigh	Civil Parish	239 (2009)	Honiton Rural District	
	Sowton	Civil Parish	619 (2009)	St Thomas Rural District	
	Stockland	Civil Parish	673 (2009)	Axminster Rural District	
	Stoke Canon	Civil Parish	674 (2009)	St Thomas Rural District	
	Talaton	Civil Parish	639 (2009)	Honiton Rural District	
	Uplyme	Civil Parish	1,610 (2009)	Axminster Rural District	
	Upottery	Civil Parish	718 (2009)	Honiton Rural District	
	Upton Pyne	Civil Parish	494 (2009)	St Thomas Rural District	
	West Hill	Civil parish		Ottery St Mary Urban District	
	Whimple	Civil Parish	1,778 (2009)	St Thomas Rural District	
	Widworthy	Civil Parish	312 (2009)	Honiton Rural District	
	Woodbury	Civil Parish	3,092 (2009)	St Thomas Rural District	
	Yarcombe	Civil Parish	489 (2009)	Honiton Rural District	

== Exeter ==
The former Exeter County Borough is unparished.

== Mid Devon ==
The whole of the district is parished.

Image	Name	Status	Population	Former local authority	Refs
	Bampton	Town	1,841	Tiverton Rural District	
	Bickleigh	Civil Parish	243	Tiverton Rural District	
	Bow	Civil Parish	1,302	Crediton Rural District	
	Bradninch	Town	2,170	Tiverton Rural District	
	Brushford	Civil Parish	55	Crediton Rural District	
	Burlescombe	Civil Parish	974	Tiverton Rural District	
	Butterleigh	Civil Parish	105	Tiverton Rural District	
	Cadbury	Civil Parish	133	Tiverton Rural District	
	Cadeleigh	Civil Parish	195	Tiverton Rural District	
	Chawleigh	Civil Parish	640	Crediton Rural District	
	Cheriton Bishop	Civil Parish	753	Crediton Rural District	
	Cheriton Fitzpaine	Civil Parish	977	Crediton Rural District	
	Clannaborough	Civil Parish	63	Crediton Rural District	
	Clayhanger	Civil Parish	110	Tiverton Rural District	
	Clayhidon	Civil Parish	507	Tiverton Rural District	
	Coldridge	Civil Parish	384	Crediton Rural District	
	Colebrooke	Civil Parish	445	Crediton Rural District	
	Copplestone	Civil Parish	1,475	Crediton Rural District	
	Crediton	Town	8,125	Crediton Urban District	
	Crediton Hamlets	Civil Parish	1,380	Crediton Rural District	
	Cruwys Morchard	Civil Parish	535	Tiverton Rural District	
	Cullompton	Town	10,492	Tiverton Rural District	
	Culmstock	Civil Parish	986	Tiverton Rural District	
	Down St Mary	Civil Parish	374	Crediton Rural District	
	Eggesford	Civil Parish	84	Crediton Rural District	
	Halberton	Civil Parish	1,883	Tiverton Rural District	
	Hemyock	Civil Parish	2,291	Tiverton Rural District	
	Hittisleigh	Civil Parish	128	Crediton Rural District	
	Hockworthy	Civil Parish	193	Tiverton Rural District	
	Holcombe Rogus	Civil Parish	521	Tiverton Rural District	
	Huntsham	Civil Parish	144	Tiverton Rural District	
	Kennerleigh	Civil Parish	74	Crediton Rural District	
	Kentisbeare	Civil Parish	999	Tiverton Rural District	
	Lapford	Civil Parish	1,118	Crediton Rural District	
	Loxbeare	Civil Parish	167	Tiverton Rural District	
	Morchard Bishop	Civil Parish	1,041	Crediton Rural District	
	Morebath	Civil Parish	326	Tiverton Rural District	
	Newton St Cyres	Civil Parish	969	Crediton Rural District	
	Nymet Rowland	Civil Parish	104	Crediton Rural District	
	Oakford	Civil Parish	384	Tiverton Rural District	
	Poughill	Civil Parish	224	Crediton Rural District	
	Puddington	Civil Parish	195	Crediton Rural District	
	Sampford Peverell	Civil Parish	1,363	Tiverton Rural District	
	Sandford	Civil Parish	1,268	Crediton Rural District	
	Shobrooke	Civil Parish	511	Crediton Rural District	
	Silverton	Civil Parish	2,002	Tiverton Rural District	
	Stockleigh English	Civil Parish	64	Crediton Rural District	
	Stockleigh Pomeroy	Civil Parish	126	Crediton Rural District	
	Stoodleigh	Civil Parish	312	Tiverton Rural District	
	Templeton	Civil Parish	136	Tiverton Rural District	
	Thelbridge	Civil Parish	343	Crediton Rural District	
	Thorverton	Civil Parish	989	Tiverton Rural District	
	Tiverton	Town	22,291	Tiverton Municipal Borough	
	Uffculme	Civil Parish	3,087	Tiverton Rural District	
	Uplowman	Civil Parish	372	Tiverton Rural District	
	Upton Hellions	Civil Parish	67	Crediton Rural District	
	Washfield	Civil Parish	350	Tiverton Rural District	
	Washford Pyne	Civil Parish	106	Crediton Rural District	
	Wembworthy	Civil Parish	254	Crediton Rural District	
	Willand	Civil Parish	3,477	Tiverton Rural District	
	Woolfardisworthy	Civil Parish	186	Crediton Rural District	
	Zeal Monachorum	Civil Parish	405	Crediton Rural District	

== North Devon ==
The whole of the district is parished.

Image	Name	Status	Population (2021)	Former local authority	Refs
	Arlington	Civil Parish	118	Barnstaple Rural District	
	Ashford	Civil Parish	297	Barnstaple Rural District	
	Atherington	Civil Parish	421	Barnstaple Rural District	
	Barnstaple	Town	24,094	Barnstaple Municipal Borough	
	Berrynarbor	Civil Parish	853	Barnstaple Rural District	
	Bishop's Nympton	Civil Parish	919	South Molton Rural District	
	Bishop's Tawton	Civil Parish	1,180	Barnstaple Rural District	
	Bittadon	Civil Parish	51	Barnstaple Rural District	
	Bratton Fleming	Civil Parish	1,023	Barnstaple Rural District	
	Braunton	Civil Parish	8,203	Barnstaple Rural District	
	Brayford	Civil Parish	407	Barnstaple Rural District; South Molton Rural District	
	Brendon and Countisbury	Civil Parish	203	Barnstaple Rural District	
	Burrington	Civil Parish	522	South Molton Rural District	
	Challacombe	Civil Parish	166	Barnstaple Rural District	
	Chittlehamholt	Civil Parish	182	South Molton Rural District	
	Chittlehampton	Civil Parish	953	South Molton Rural District	
	Chulmleigh	Civil Parish	1,584	South Molton Rural District	
	Combe Martin	Civil Parish	2,647	Barnstaple Rural District	
	East and West Buckland	Civil Parish	505	South Molton Rural District	
	East Anstey	Civil Parish	236	South Molton Rural District	
	East Down	Civil Parish	270	Barnstaple Rural District	
	East Worlington	Civil Parish	220	South Molton Rural District	
	Filleigh	Civil Parish	282	South Molton Rural District	
	Fremington	Civil Parish	12,784	Barnstaple Rural District	
	Georgeham	Civil Parish	1,325	Barnstaple Rural District	
	George Nympton	Civil Parish	168	South Molton Rural District	
	Goodleigh	Civil Parish	477	Barnstaple Rural District	
	Heanton Punchardon	Civil Parish	2,600	Barnstaple Rural District	
	Horwood, Lovacott and Newton Tracey	Civil Parish	475	Barnstaple Rural District	
	Ilfracombe	Town	11,035	Ilfracombe Urban District	
	Instow	Civil Parish	660	Barnstaple Rural District	
	Kentisbury	Civil Parish	353	Barnstaple Rural District	
	King's Nympton	Civil Parish	444	South Molton Rural District	
	Knowstone	Civil Parish	231	South Molton Rural District	
	Landkey	Civil Parish	2,175	Barnstaple Rural District	
	Loxhore	Civil Parish	181	Barnstaple Rural District	
	Lynton and Lynmouth	Town	1,404	Lynton Urban District	
	Mariansleigh	Civil Parish	170	South Molton Rural District	
	Martinhoe	Civil Parish	110	Barnstaple Rural District	
	Marwood	Civil Parish	849	Barnstaple Rural District	
	Meshaw	Civil Parish	168	South Molton Rural District	
	Molland	Civil Parish	190	South Molton Rural District	
	Mortehoe	Civil Parish	1,362	Barnstaple Rural District	
	North Molton	Civil Parish	1,159	South Molton Rural District	
	Parracombe	Civil Parish	306	Barnstaple Rural District	
	Pilton West	Civil Parish	270	Barnstaple Rural District	
	Queen's Nympton	Civil Parish	35	South Molton Rural District	
	Rackenford	Civil Parish	417	South Molton Rural District	
	Romansleigh	Civil Parish	102	South Molton Rural District	
	Rose Ash	Civil Parish	316	South Molton Rural District	
	Satterleigh and Warkleigh	Civil Parish	182	South Molton Rural District	
	Shirwell	Civil Parish	429	Barnstaple Rural District	
	South Molton	Town	6,276	South Molton Rural District	
	Stoke Rivers	Civil Parish	173	Barnstaple Rural District	
	Swimbridge	Civil Parish	836	Barnstaple Rural District	
	Tawstock	Civil Parish	2,745	Barnstaple Rural District	
	Trentishoe	Civil Parish	46	Barnstaple Rural District	
	Twitchen	Civil Parish	64	South Molton Rural District	
	West Anstey	Civil Parish	187	South Molton Rural District	
	West Down	Civil Parish	673	Barnstaple Rural District	
	Westleigh	Civil Parish	333	Barnstaple Rural District	
	Witheridge	Civil Parish	1,557	South Molton Rural District	

== Plymouth ==
The former Plymouth County Borough is unparished.

== South Hams ==
The whole of the district is parished.

- Ashprington ^{43}
- Aveton Gifford ^{20}
- Berry Pomeroy ^{43}
- Bickleigh ^{30}
- Bigbury ^{20}
- Blackawton ^{20}
- Brixton ^{30}
- Buckland Tout Saints ^{20}
- Charleton ^{20}
- Chivelstone ^{20}
- Churchstow ^{20}
- Cornwood ^{30}
- Cornworthy ^{43}
- Dartington ^{43}
- Dartmouth (town) ^{11}
- Dean Prior ^{43}
- Diptford ^{43}
- Dittisham ^{43}
- East Allington ^{20}
- East Portlemouth ^{20}
- Ermington ^{30}
- Frogmore and Sherford ^{20}
- Halwell and Moreleigh ^{43}
- Harberton ^{43}
- Harford ^{30}
- Holbeton ^{30}
- Holne ^{43}
- Ivybridge (town) ^{30}
- Kingsbridge (town) ^{21}
- Kingston ^{20}
- Kingswear ^{43}
- Littlehempston ^{43}
- Loddiswell ^{20}
- Malborough ^{20}
- Marldon ^{43}
- Modbury ^{20}
- Newton and Noss ^{30}
- North Huish ^{43}
- Rattery ^{43}
- Ringmore ^{20}
- Salcombe (town) ^{31}
- Shaugh Prior ^{30}
- Slapton ^{20}
- South Brent ^{43}
- South Huish ^{20}
- South Milton ^{20}
- South Pool ^{20}
- Sparkwell ^{30}
- Staverton ^{43}
- Stoke Fleming ^{20}
- Stoke Gabriel ^{43}
- Stokenham ^{20}
- Strete ^{20}
- Thurlestone ^{20}
- Totnes (town) ^{42}
- Ugborough ^{43}
- Wembury ^{30}
- West Alvington ^{20}
- West Buckfastleigh ^{43}
- Woodleigh ^{20}
- Yealmpton ^{30}

== Teignbridge ==
The whole of the district is parished.

- Abbotskerswell ^{23}
- Ashburton (town) ^{1}
- Ashcombe ^{35}
- Ashton ^{35}
- Bickington ^{23}
- Bishopsteignton ^{23}
- Bovey Tracey (town) ^{23}
- Bridford ^{35}
- Broadhempston ^{23}
- Buckfastleigh (town) ^{7}
- Buckland-in-the-Moor ^{23}
- Christow ^{35}
- Chudleigh (town) ^{23}
- Coffinswell ^{23}
- Dawlish (town) ^{12}
- Denbury and Torbryan^{23}
- Doddiscombsleigh ^{35}
- Dunchideock ^{35}
- Dunsford ^{35}
- Exminster ^{35}
- Haccombe with Combe ^{23}
- Hennock ^{23}
- Holcombe Burnell ^{35}
- Ide ^{35}
- Ideford ^{23}
- Ilsington ^{23}
- Ipplepen ^{23}
- Kenn ^{35}
- Kenton ^{35}
- Kingskerswell ^{23}
- Kingsteignton (town) ^{23}
- Lustleigh ^{23}
- Mamhead ^{35}
- Manaton ^{23}
- Moretonhampstead ^{23}
- Newton Abbot (town) ^{24}
- North Bovey ^{23}
- Ogwell ^{23}
- Powderham ^{35}
- Shaldon ^{37}
- Shillingford St George ^{35}
- Starcross ^{35}
- Stokeinteignhead ^{23}
- Tedburn St Mary ^{35}
- Teigngrace ^{23}
- Teignmouth (town) ^{37}
- Trusham ^{23}
- Whitestone ^{35}
- Widecombe in the Moor ^{23}
- Woodland ^{23}

== Torbay ==
Part of the former Torbay County Borough is unparished.

- Brixham (town) ^{40}

== Torridge ==
Lundy is unparished

- Abbots Bickington ^{16}
- Abbotsham ^{6}
- Alverdiscott ^{41}
- Alwington ^{6}
- Ashreigney ^{41}
- Ashwater ^{16}
- Beaford ^{41}
- Bideford (town) ^{5}
- Black Torrington ^{16}
- Bradford ^{16}
- Bradworthy ^{16}
- Bridgerule ^{16}
- Broadwoodwidger ^{16}
- Buckland Brewer ^{6}
- Buckland Filleigh ^{41}
- Bulkworthy ^{6}
- Clawton ^{16}
- Clovelly ^{6}
- Cookbury ^{16}
- Dolton ^{41}
- Dowland ^{41}
- East Putford ^{6}
- Frithelstock ^{41}
- Great Torrington (town) ^{15}
- Halwill ^{16}
- Hartland ^{6}
- High Bickington ^{41}
- Hollacombe ^{16}
- Holsworthy (town) ^{16}
- Holsworthy Hamlets ^{16}
- Huish ^{41}
- Huntshaw ^{41}
- Landcross ^{6}
- Langtree ^{41}
- Littleham ^{6}
- Little Torrington ^{41}
- Luffincott ^{16}
- Merton ^{41}
- Milton Damerel ^{16}
- Monkleigh ^{6}
- Newton St Petrock ^{6}
- Northam (town) ^{25}
- Northcott ^{16}
- Pancrasweek ^{16}
- Parkham ^{6}
- Peters Marland ^{41}
- Petrockstow ^{41}
- Pyworthy ^{16}
- Roborough ^{41}
- Shebbear ^{41}
- Sheepwash ^{41}
- St Giles in the Wood ^{41}
- St Giles on the Heath ^{16}
- Sutcombe ^{16}
- Tetcott ^{16}
- Thornbury ^{16}
- Virginstow ^{16}
- Weare Giffard ^{41}
- Welcombe ^{6}
- West Putford ^{16}
- Winkleigh ^{41}
- Woolfardisworthy ^{6}
- Yarnscombe ^{41}

== West Devon ==
The whole of the borough is parished.

- Beaworthy ^{27}
- Belstone ^{27}
- Bere Ferrers ^{36}
- Bondleigh ^{27}
- Bradstone ^{36}
- Bratton Clovelly ^{27}
- Brentor ^{36}
- Bridestowe ^{27}
- Bridestowe and Sourton Common ^{27}
- Broadwoodkelly ^{27}
- Buckland Monachorum ^{36}
- Chagford ^{27}
- Coryton ^{36}
- Dartmoor Forest ^{36}
- Drewsteignton ^{27}
- Dunterton ^{36}
- Exbourne ^{27}
- Germansweek ^{27}
- Gidleigh ^{27}
- Gulworthy ^{36}
- Hatherleigh (town) ^{27}
- Highampton ^{27}
- Horrabridge ^{36}
- Iddesleigh ^{27}
- Inwardleigh ^{27}
- Jacobstowe ^{27}
- Kelly ^{36}
- Lamerton ^{36}
- Lewtrenchard ^{36}
- Lifton ^{36}
- Lydford ^{36}
- Marystow ^{36}
- Mary Tavy ^{36}
- Meavy ^{36}
- Meeth ^{27}
- Milton Abbot ^{36}
- Monkokehampton ^{27}
- North Tawton (town) ^{27}
- Northlew ^{27}
- Okehampton (town) ^{26}
- Okehampton Hamlets ^{27}
- Peter Tavy ^{36}
- Sampford Courtenay ^{27}
- Sampford Spiney ^{36}
- Sheepstor ^{36}
- Sourton ^{27}
- South Tawton ^{27}
- Spreyton ^{27}
- Sticklepath ^{27}
- Stowford ^{36}
- Sydenham Damerel ^{36}
- Tavistock (town) ^{36}
- Throwleigh ^{27}
- Thrushelton ^{36}
- Walkhampton ^{36}
- Whitchurch ^{36}

== Notes ==
1. Formerly Ashburton Urban District
2. Formerly Axminster Rural District
3. Formerly Barnstaple Municipal Borough
4. Formerly Barnstaple Rural District
5. Formerly Bideford Municipal Borough
6. Formerly Bideford Rural District
7. Formerly Buckfastleigh Urban District
8. Formerly Budleigh Salterton Urban District
9. Formerly Crediton Rural District
10. Formerly Crediton Urban District
11. Formerly Dartmouth Municipal Borough
12. Formerly Dawlish Urban District
13. Formerly Exeter County Borough
14. Formerly Exmouth Urban District
15. Formerly Great Torrington Municipal Borough
16. Formerly Holsworthy Rural District
17. Formerly Honiton Municipal Borough
18. Formerly Honiton Rural District
19. Formerly Ilfracombe Urban District
20. Formerly Kingsbridge Rural District
21. Formerly Kingsbridge Urban District
22. Formerly Lynton Urban District
23. Formerly Newton Abbot Rural District
24. Formerly Newton Abbot Urban District
25. Formerly Northam Urban District
26. Formerly Okehampton Municipal Borough
27. Formerly Okehampton Rural District
28. Formerly Ottery St Mary Urban District
29. Formerly Plymouth County Borough
30. Formerly Plympton St Mary Rural District
31. Formerly Salcombe Urban District
32. Formerly Seaton Urban District
33. Formerly Sidmouth Urban District
34. Formerly South Molton Rural District
35. Formerly St Thomas Rural District
36. Formerly Tavistock Rural District
37. Formerly Teignmouth Urban District
38. Formerly Tiverton Municipal Borough
39. Formerly Tiverton Rural District
40. Formerly Torbay County Borough
41. Formerly Torrington Rural District
42. Formerly Totnes Municipal Borough
43. Formerly Totnes Rural District

== See also ==
- List of civil parishes in England
