= Honiton Rural District =

Rural parish

Honiton Rural District was a rural district within the county of Devon. It was created in 1894 and was abolished in 1974. It was succeeded by the Mid Devon District Council.

== Parishes ==
This rural district contained the following civil parishes.

- Awliscombe
- Branscombe
- Broadhembury
- Buckerell
- Combe Raleigh
- Cotleigh
- Dunkeswell
- Farway
- Feniton
- Gittisham
- Luppitt
- Monkton
- Newton Poppleford and Harpford
- Northleigh
- Offwell
- Payhembury
- Plymtree
- Salcombe Regis
- Sheldon
- Sidbury
- Southleigh
- Talaton
- Upottery
- Venn Ottery
- Widworthy
- Yarcombe
