= Crediton Rural District =

Rural parish

Crediton Rural District was a rural district within the county of Devon. It was created in 1894 and was abolished in 1974. It was succeeded by the Mid Devon District Council.

== Parishes ==
This rural district contained the following civil parishes.

- Bow
- Brushford
- Chawleigh
- Cheriton Bishop
- Cheriton Fitzpaine
- Clannaborough
- Coldridge
- Colebrooke
- Crediton Hamlets
- Down St Mary
- Eggesford
- Hittisleigh
- Kennerleigh
- Lapford
- Morchard Bishop
- Newton St Cyres
- Nymet Rowland
- Poughill
- Puddington
- Sandford
- Shobrooke
- Stockleigh English
- Stockleigh Pomeroy
- Thelbridge
- Upton Hellions
- Washford Pyne
- Wembworthy
- Woolfardisworthy
- Zeal Monachorum
