= Colyton Hundred =

Ancient administrative unit of Devon, England

The hundred of Colyton was the name of one of thirty two ancient administrative units of Devon, England.

The parishes in the hundred were: Branscombe; Colyton; Cotleigh; Farway; Monkton; Northleigh; Offwell; Seaton and Beer; Shute; Southleigh and Widworthy.

== See also ==
- List of hundreds of England and Wales - Devon
