= List of road junctions in the United Kingdom: X-Z =

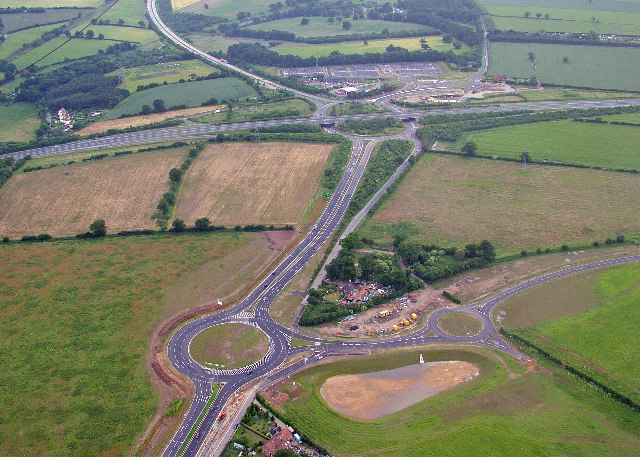
Thickthorn Interchange

This is part of the list of road junctions in the United Kingdom.

Many road junctions are named after pubs. For more information regarding the derivation of pub names see pub names.

== Y ==
Junction Name	Type	Location	Roads	Grid Reference	Notes
Yard Cross	Crossroads	Monkton, Devon	A30; unclass.	ST194044	
Yeoman's Roundabout	Roundabout	Giffard Park, Milton Keynes	V10 Brickhill Street; Yeoman's Drive; Clayton Gate	52°04′08″N 0°44′30″W	
Yorkshire Grey	Roundabout	Eltham, LB Greenwich	A205 Westhorne Avenue; A210 Eltham Road	51°27′10″N 0°02′09″E	Named after the pub on the roundabout.
Young's Corner	Crossroads	Chiswick, LB Hounslow	A315 High Road; A315 King Street; A402 Goldhawk Road; British Grove	TQ219786	Named after C Young, cricketer
