= Garden house =

Garden house may refer to:

- a summer house or small building in a garden
- a house built under the provision of special legislation (usu. in Scandinavia), for instance a Friggebod
- The Garden House, an open garden near Buckland Monachorum, Devon, UK
- Garden House School, in Chelsea, London, England
