= Brushford =

Brushford may refer to:

- Brushford, Devon
- Brushford, Somerset
