= Luppitt Inn =

Coordinates: 50.853017°N 3.18175°W

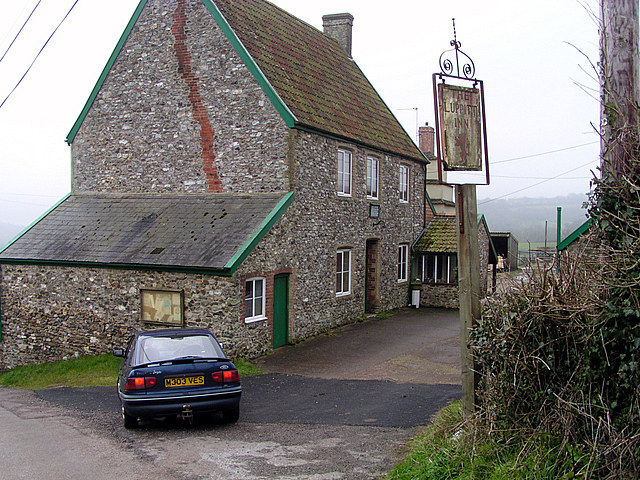
- Luppitt Inn
- Interactive map of the Luppitt Inn area
- Former names: Red Lion Inn, Luppitt

General information
- Type: Farmhouse pub
- Location: Luppitt
- Completed: 19th century
- Owner: Mary Wright

The Luppitt Inn is the only public house at Luppitt, Devon. Located in the front rooms of a farmhouse, the building is constructed from stone, rendered on one side and includes a tiled roof. The main house, still part of a working farm, was built in the early 19th century. The pub entrance is on the north side of the house, leading to a two-roomed pub. The serving room includes a simple counter made of matchboard, and some simple shelves, as well as a few seats, whilst the second room includes a brick fireplace. The toilets are outside, across the yard. The only table in the pub is covered in puzzles. The unique layout has meant that the pub is on the Campaign for Real Ale's National Inventory of Historic Pub Interiors.

Previously known as the Red Lion Inn, Luppitt, it is a farmhouse pub which would have been common around England in the 19th century. One of the last small, informal alehouses in Britain, it does have the licence to sell alcohol. However, it sells only one beer, brewed locally at Otter Brewery, drawn directly from the cask; ciders in a tin and there is a small selection of spirits and the only food on offer is peanut snacks. The room has no till, music or electrical distractions, and the only staff member for many years was the landlady, Vera Mary Wright (commonly known as Mary), latterly more often than not supplemented by members of her family who nevertheless rarely serve anyone but the local regulars. Mary had a reputation for testing new customers by handing them three dimensional metal puzzles to solve. The pub has been run by Wright's family for more than 100 years; Mary inherited it from her husband, William Wright, who in turn inherited it from his father, Charles Wright. Alas Mary Wright died on 23 December 2020 and the running of the pub is now solely in the hands of her relatives.
