= Otter Brewery =

Brewery in Devon, England

- Industry: Alcoholic beverage
- Founded: 1990
- Headquarters: Luppitt, Devon, England
- Products: Beer, Lager
- Production output: ~20,000 UK barrels
- Owner: McCaig family
- Number of employees: 35
- Website: http://www.otterbrewery.com

Otter Brewery is a brewery in Luppitt, near Honiton, Devon, and named after the nearby River Otter. The brewery was founded in 1990 by David and Mary Ann McCaig and is still run by the family, who also run a pub owned by the company, the Holt in Honiton. The company invests heavily in sustainability, with such innovations as a cellar built mostly underground to save the needs for refrigeration and the use of reed beds to recycle waste water.

== Awards ==
Otter Brewery has won a number of awards, including The Good Pub Guide "Brewery of the Year" in 2013 as well as being named "Most Sustainable Brewery" at the 2011 Society of Independent Brewers awards.

== Products ==
Otter produce five regular beers and two lagers, as well as speciality and seasonal ales.

=== Regular beers ===
- Otter Bitter (ABV 3.6%) - Green label / badge
- Otter Ale (ABV 4.5%) - Red label / badge
- Otter Amber (ABV 4.3%) - Orange badge (cask only)
- Otter Bright (ABV 4.0%) - Creme label / badge
- Otter Head (ABV 5.8%) - Blue label / badge

=== Lager ===
- Tarka (ABV 4.8%)
- Four (ABV 4.0%)

=== Cider ===
- Wildsider (ABV 4.6%) - Black badge (cask only)

=== Gin ===
- New Moon (ABV 42%) - Blue bottle (bottle only)

=== Speciality and seasonal beers ===
Otter produce one standard winter beer which goes under a number of names, including Otter Witch (Halloween), Otter Claus (Christmas), MacOtter (Burns Night) and Otter Cupid (Valentine's Day). The brewery says that "We firmly believe that one particularly good beer is better than a bucketful of seasonals". It also produces a session beer named Beautiful Daze which is sold at Beautiful Days music festival at nearby Escot, where it runs the beer stalls, and a speciality Flaming Ale which is sold at the Tar Barrels event in Ottery St Mary.

== Pubs ==
The brewery opened a pub named The Holt in Cathedral Close, Exeter in 2025.
