= Cliston Hundred =

Ancient administrative unit of Devon, England

The hundred of Cliston was the name of one of thirty-two ancient administrative units of Devon, England.

The parishes in the hundred were: Broadclyst; Butterleigh; Clyst Hydon; Clyst St Lawrence and Whimple.

== See also ==
- List of hundreds of England and Wales - Devon
