= South Molton Rural District =

Rural district of Devon

Coordinates: 51.020909°N 3.838348°W

- Rural district
- Population
  - 1901: 10,964
  - 1971: 10,620
- History
  - Created: 28 December 1894
  - Abolished: 31 March 1974
  - Succeeded by: North Devon
  - HQ: South Molton
- Contained within
  - County: Devon

South Molton Rural District was a rural district in the administrative county of Devon, England, from 1894 to 1974, covering an area in the north of the county. The district was named after the town of South Molton and had its offices there. The town itself was initially excluded from the rural district, being a self-governing municipal borough. In 1967 the town was absorbed into the district.

The district was abolished in 1974, when the area became part of the new district of North Devon.

== History ==
The district had its origins in the South Molton Poor Law Union, which had been created in 1835 covering South Molton itself and several surrounding parishes. In 1872 sanitary districts were established, giving public health and local government responsibilities for rural areas to the existing boards of guardians of poor law unions. The South Molton Rural Sanitary District therefore covered the area of the poor law union except for the town of South Molton, which as a municipal borough formed its own urban authority. The South Molton Rural Sanitary District was administered from South Molton Union Workhouse, which had been built in 1837–1838 on North Road in South Molton.

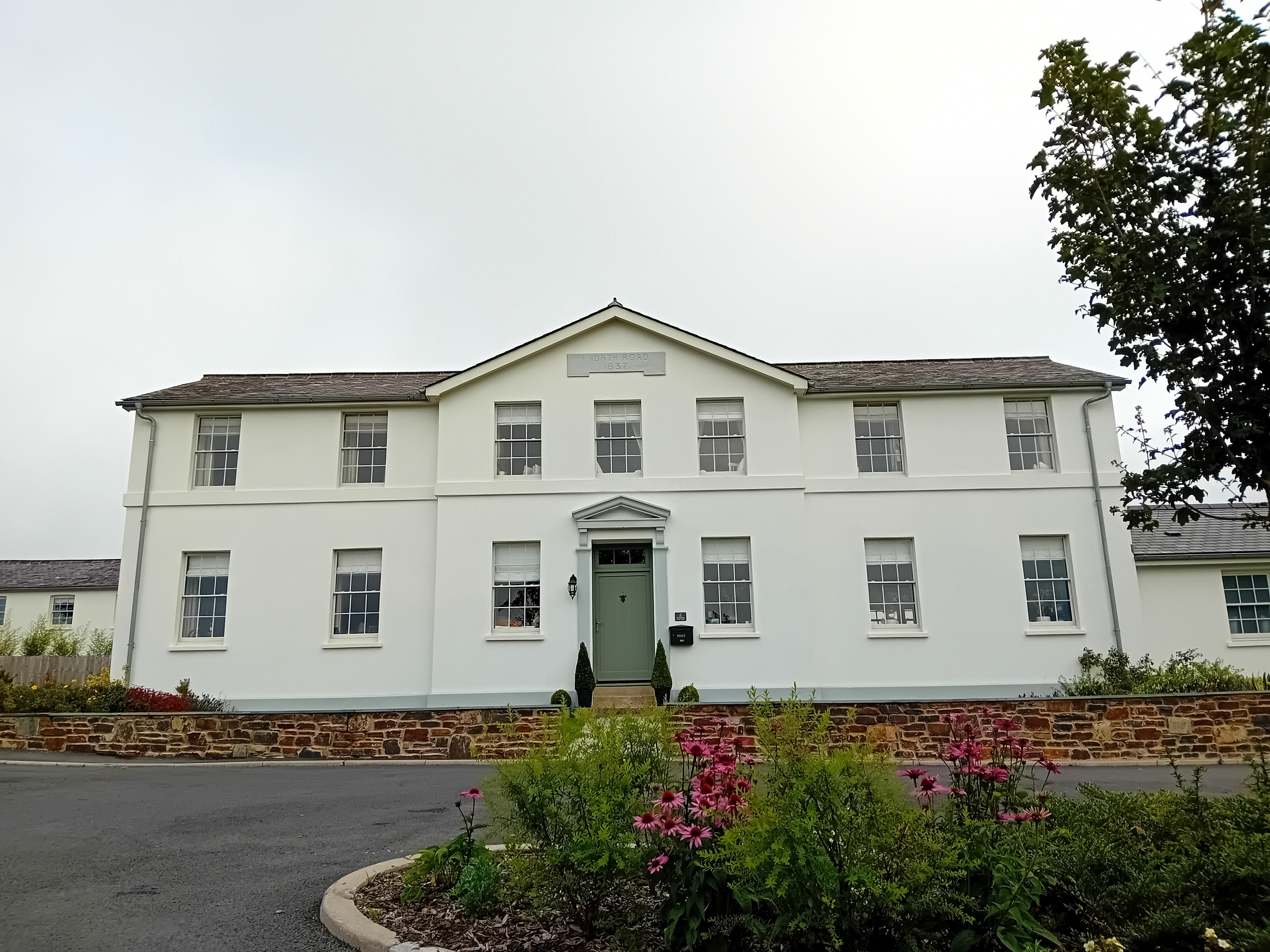
Former South Molton Union Workhouse: Council's meeting place until 1950.

Under the Local Government Act 1894, rural sanitary districts became rural districts from 28 December 1894. The South Molton Rural District Council held its first meeting on 3 January 1895 at the workhouse. John Mortimer of Chittlehampton was appointed the first chairman of the council.

On 1 April 1966 part of Brushford and East Anstey parishes were transferred to Dulverton Rural District. On 1 April 1967 the town of South Molton was added to the South Molton Rural District as a rural borough.

South Molton Rural District was abolished in 1974 under the Local Government Act 1972. The area was merged with the neighbouring Barnstaple Rural District and the borough of Barnstaple and urban districts of Ilfracombe and Lynton to become North Devon.

== Premises ==
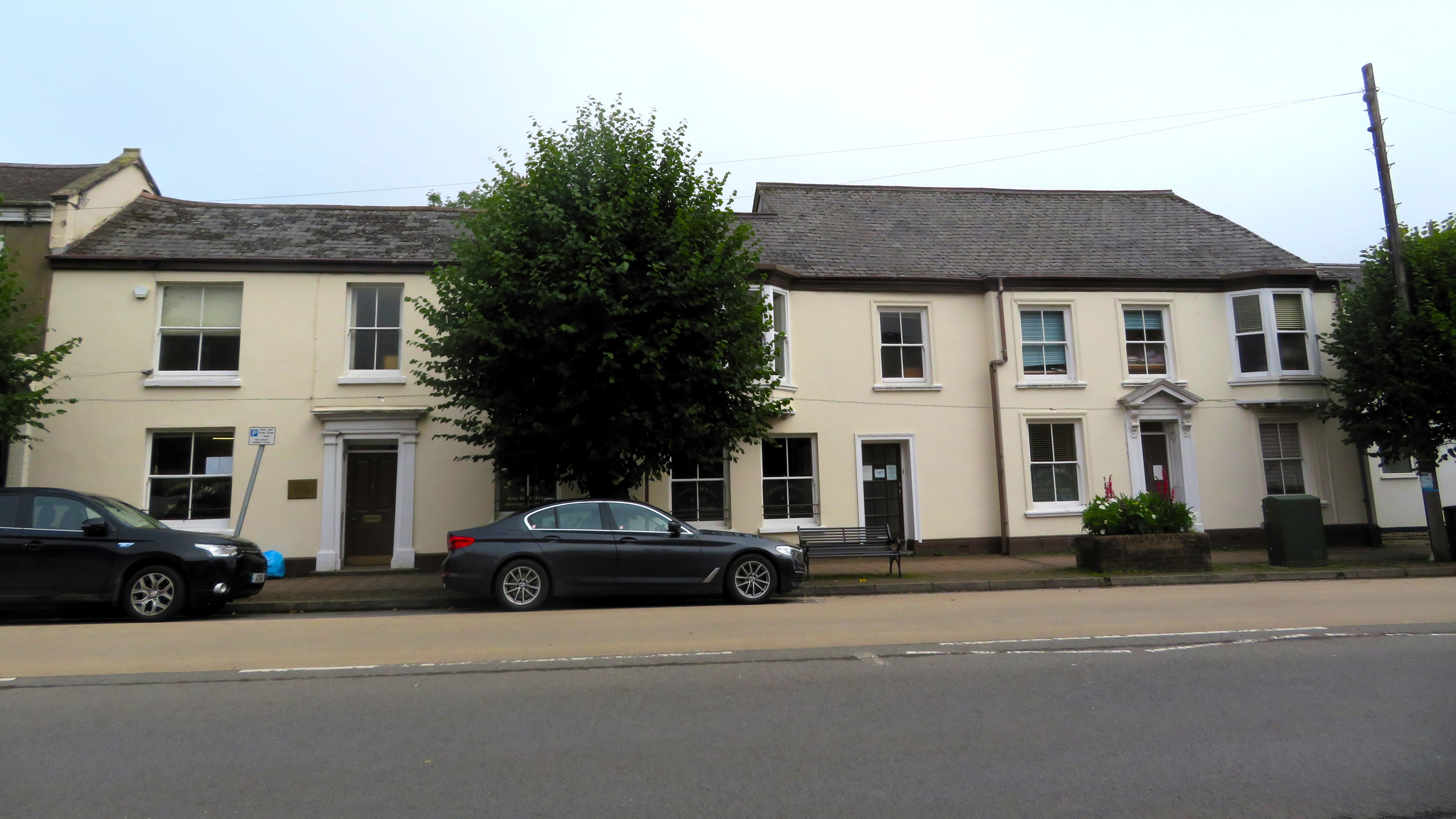
7-8 East Street, South Molton: Council's offices.

The council's offices were at 7 East Street in South Molton, which was also the office of the solicitor who acted as clerk to the council. In 1937 the council bought the neighbouring house at 8 East Street to serve as additional offices. Meetings continued to be held in the boardroom at the workhouse until 1950 when it was converted into the Beech House care home following the creation of the National Health Service. The council then moved its meeting place to a room rented from the town council at its offices at 1 East Street.
