= Dunkeswell =

Village in Devon, England

Coordinates: 50.863°N 3.221°W

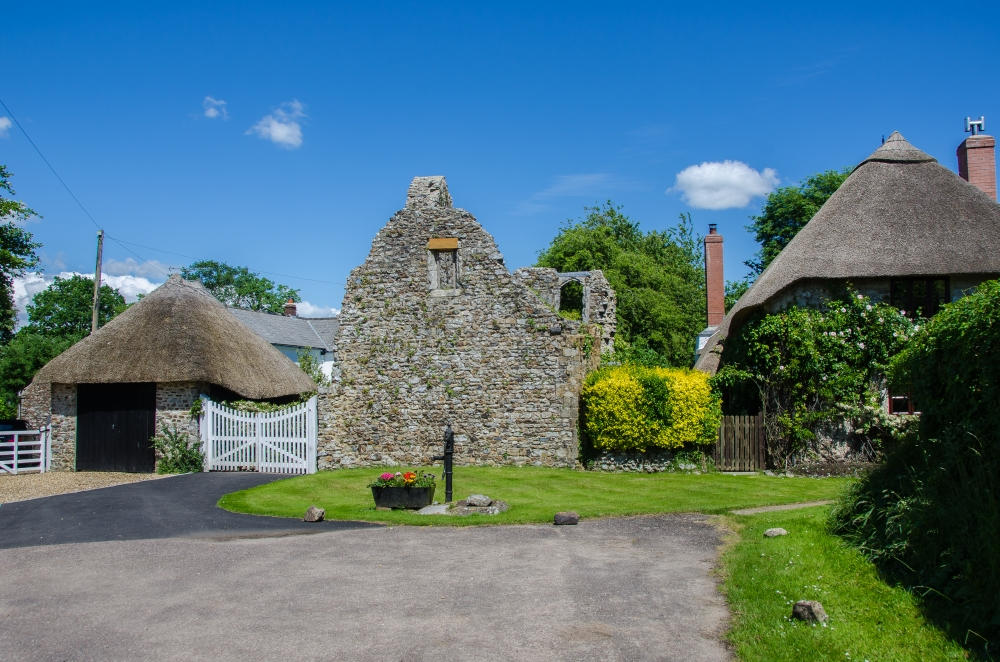
- The gatehouse at Dunkeswell Abbey

- Location within Devon
- Population: 1,361 (2011)
- OS grid reference: ST1407
- Civil parish: Dunkeswell
- District: East Devon
- Shire county: Devon
- Region: South West
- Country: England
- Sovereign state: United Kingdom
- Post town: HONITON
- Postcode district: EX14
- Dialling code: 01404
- Police: Devon and Cornwall
- Fire: Devon and Somerset
- Ambulance: South Western
- UK Parliament: Honiton and Sidmouth

Dunkeswell is a village and civil parish in East Devon, England, located about 5 miles (8.0 km) north of the town of Honiton. At the 2001 census, the parish had a population of 1,553, reducing to 1,361 at the 2011 Census. There is an electoral ward with the same name whose population at the above census was 2,000. The parish is surrounded, clockwise from the north, by the parishes of Hemyock, Luppitt, Combe Raleigh, Awliscombe, Broadhembury and Sheldon.

== History ==
Dunkeswell is notable for having a busy small airfield, now Dunkeswell Aerodrome which was initially established as an American Navy air base during World War II, and continues to offer civil flight services to this day.

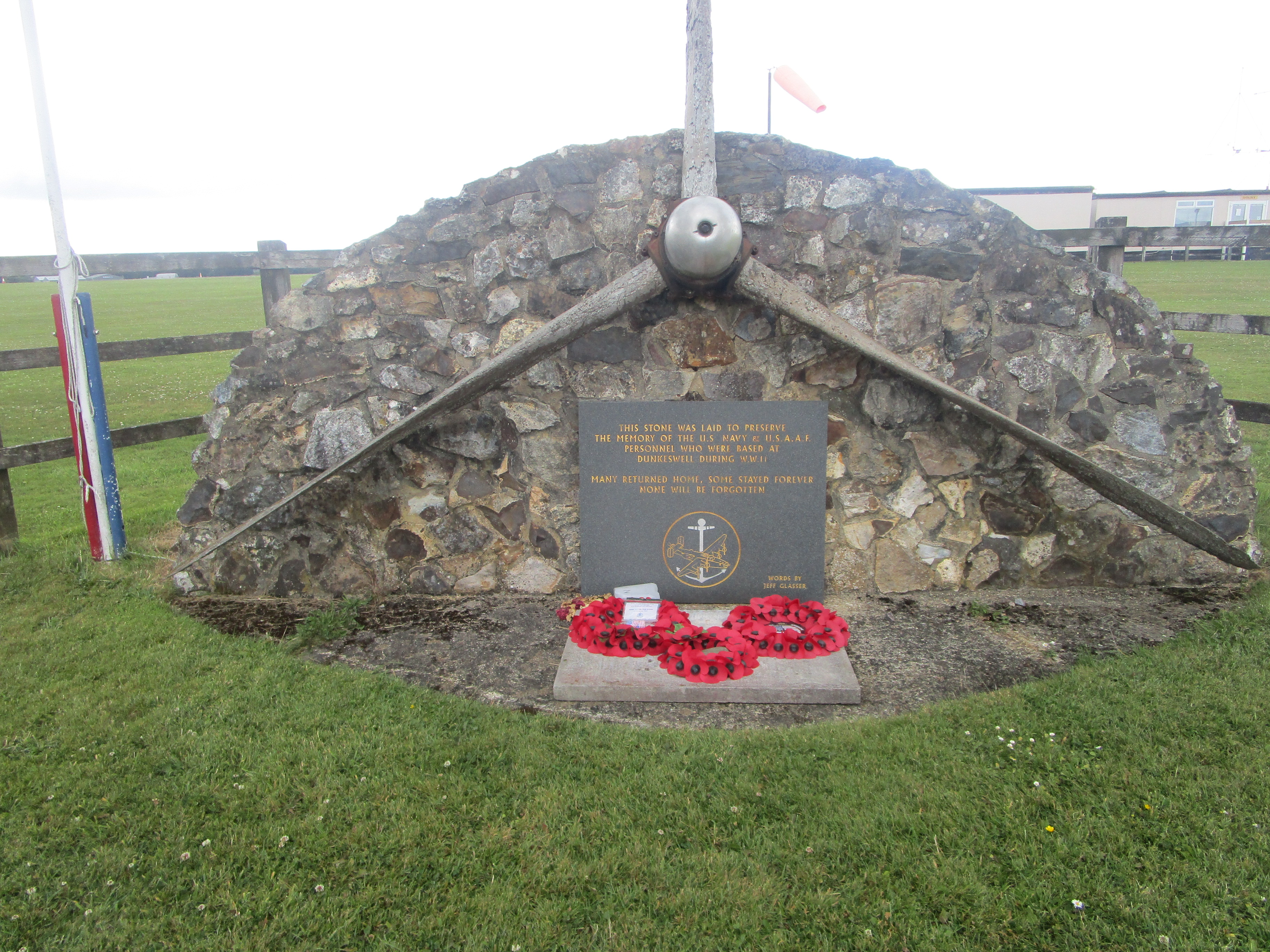
Dunkeswell Aerodrome war memorial to all the US pilots who served at the aerodrome during WWII

The church, restored in 1868 from an older foundation, is of interest for its Norman font.

Dunkeswell Eco Business Park, located near the aerodrome, was constructed to provide environmentally-friendly business space for start-up businesses, businesses who are considered to be at a disadvantage such as those run by younger owners or women, and businesses that have outgrown existing premises.

Dunkeswell was the birthplace of the Canadian clergyman Henry Scadding.

== Climate ==
The highest recorded temperature since 1979 was 33.9 °C (93.0 °F) on 13 August 2026 and the lowest was −11.8 °C (10.8 °F) on 13 January 1987.

Climate data for Dunkeswell Aerodrome 252m amsl (1991–2020) (extremes 1979–present)
Month	Jan	Feb	Mar	Apr	May	Jun	Jul	Aug	Sep	Oct	Nov	Dec	Year
Record high °C (°F)	13.5 (56.3)	16.2 (61.2)	19.9 (67.8)	23.7 (74.7)	29.7 (85.5)	33.0 (91.4)	31.1 (88.0)	33.9 (93.0)	27.8 (82.0)	24.1 (75.4)	16.6 (61.9)	13.5 (56.3)	33.9 (93.0)
Mean daily maximum °C (°F)	7.0 (44.6)	7.3 (45.1)	9.5 (49.1)	12.2 (54.0)	15.3 (59.5)	18.1 (64.6)	19.9 (67.8)	19.6 (67.3)	17.3 (63.1)	13.4 (56.1)	9.9 (49.8)	7.6 (45.7)	13.1 (55.6)
Daily mean °C (°F)	4.5 (40.1)	4.6 (40.3)	6.2 (43.2)	8.3 (46.9)	11.2 (52.2)	14.0 (57.2)	15.8 (60.4)	15.7 (60.3)	13.6 (56.5)	10.5 (50.9)	7.3 (45.1)	5.1 (41.2)	9.8 (49.6)
Mean daily minimum °C (°F)	2.0 (35.6)	1.9 (35.4)	2.9 (37.2)	4.4 (39.9)	7.0 (44.6)	9.8 (49.6)	11.8 (53.2)	11.9 (53.4)	9.9 (49.8)	7.6 (45.7)	4.7 (40.5)	2.6 (36.7)	6.4 (43.5)
Record low °C (°F)	−11.8 (10.8)	−10.5 (13.1)	−7.5 (18.5)	−3.8 (25.2)	−0.9 (30.4)	1.9 (35.4)	4.2 (39.6)	4.9 (40.8)	1.8 (35.2)	−2.2 (28.0)	−5.7 (21.7)	−9.2 (15.4)	−11.8 (10.8)
Average precipitation mm (inches)	112.2 (4.42)	86.1 (3.39)	77.7 (3.06)	75.5 (2.97)	64.4 (2.54)	72.8 (2.87)	67.4 (2.65)	86.4 (3.40)	78.4 (3.09)	119.3 (4.70)	127.8 (5.03)	119.5 (4.70)	1,087.5 (42.81)
Average precipitation days (≥ 1.0 mm)	15.8	13.0	12.3	11.0	10.5	9.8	10.5	11.7	10.9	14.7	15.6	16.0	151.9
Mean monthly sunshine hours	57.2	76.7	115.0	169.8	196.2	209.1	198.9	181.6	149.6	106.0	69.4	57.9	1,587.4
Source 1: Met Office
Source 2: Starlings Roost Weather

== Dunkeswell Abbey ==
The abbey is 2 miles (3.2 km) north of the village. The abbey was founded in 1201 by William Briwere as a Cistercian monastery and offshoot of Forde Abbey. The founder granted much property within Devon to the abbey. Around two years before his death in 1226, he entered the community and was eventually buried in front of the high altar of the abbey church.

Following the Dissolution of the Monasteries the abbey was closed in 1539 and granted to John Russell, 1st Baron Russell (1485–1555), later 1st Earl of Bedford, and was mostly demolished quickly, though a section remained in domestic use until the 19th century. In 1842, a parish church was built over part of the site. Some surviving fragments of monastery include the partial end wall of the cellarer's range and parts of a gatehouse. Some carved fragments survive within Holy Trinity Church which was built here in 1842 in Early English style.

== See also ==
- Wolford Chapel
