= The Garden House =

Open garden in Buckland Monachorum

Coordinates: 50°29′40″N 4°7′22″W

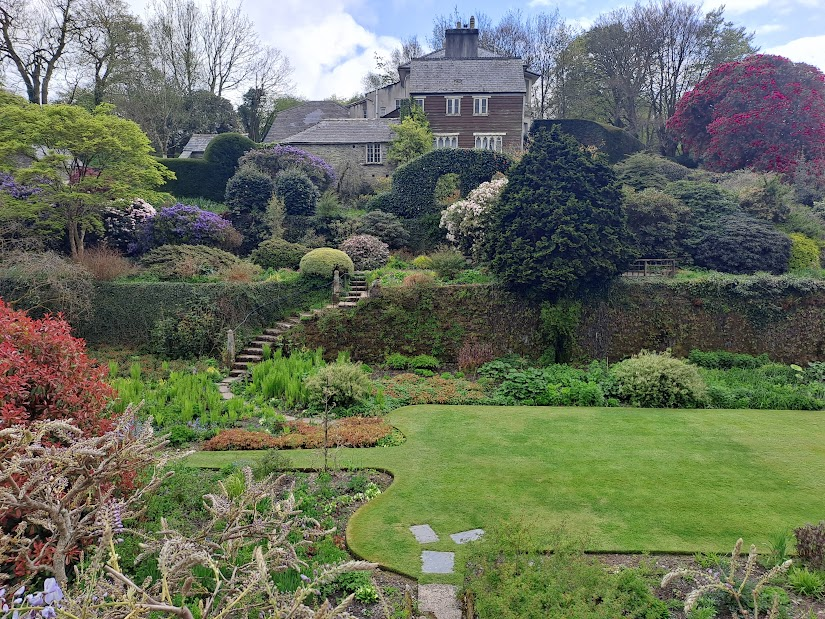
- North-facing view of garden and house
- Interactive map of the The Garden House area

General information
- Location: Buckland Monachorum, The Garden House, Buckland Monachorum, Yelverton, Devon, PL20 7LQ, England

Website
- www.thegardenhouse.org.uk

The Garden House is an open garden located in Buckland Monachorum, Devon, England. The first house built in 1305 was intended to be a home for the vicars of the civil parish.

The gardens are now open to the public and are home to a number of historical features, including the ruins of the old vicarage, a 14th-century barn, and a 17th-century dovecote.

== History ==
The first house was built in 1305 by the Abbot, upon instruction from the Bishop to build a house for the parish priest, and was later enlarged to become a three-storey building.

The Garden House was originally the early 19th century home of the vicars of Buckland Monachorum. The garden was bought by Lionel Fortescue, a former head of languages and master at Eton College, and his wife Katherine Fortescue in the 1940s following World War II. They began a process of restoration and expansion over the course of 40 years and created a series of linked gardens.

The remains of this building are a tower with spiral staircase and a thatched barn, formerly the kitchen, are now ruins on the lower terrace in the walled garden. A tearoom has also been built on the ground floor.

== Grounds ==
The Garden House covers 10 acres of land and is divided into themed areas. There are five terraces in the walled garden that began the garden. They include formally planted areas, including a tennis court, camellia walk and a lower terrace of folial borders.

The Walled Garden is a 2-acre plot set around the remnants of a 16th-century vicarage. It features terraced layout and a tower offering views of the landscape.

The Jubilee Arboretum, which contains over a hundred specimen trees as well as a man made lake, was officially opened by HRH The Countess of Wessex in 2013.

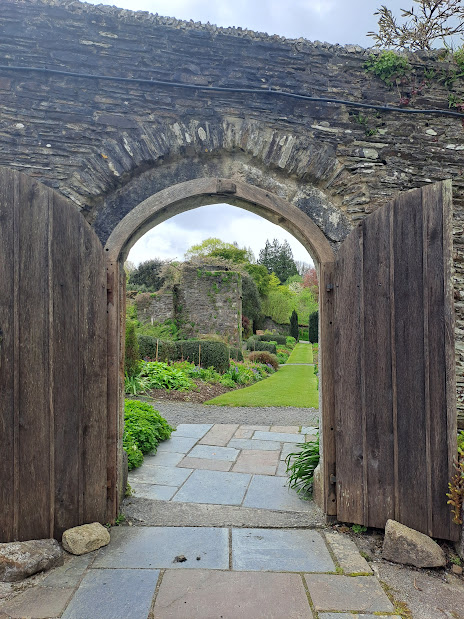
Doors into the walled garden

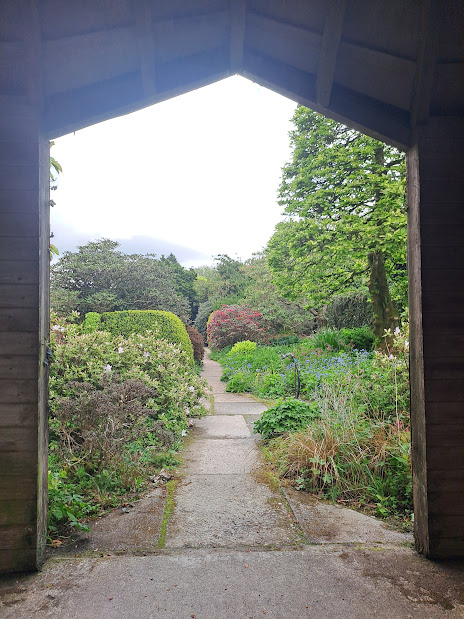
View onto path from the dovecote

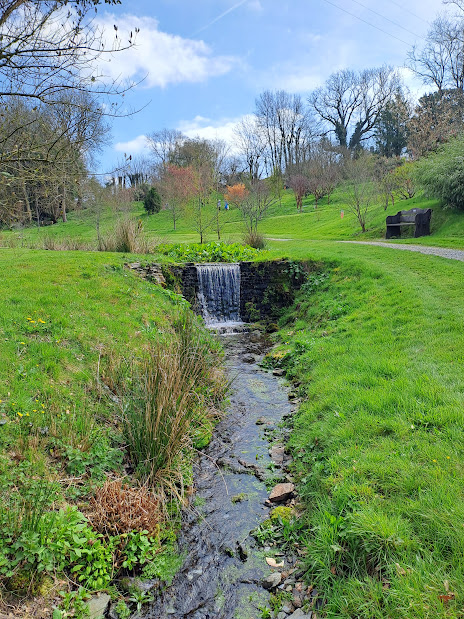
The Jubilee Arboretum, stream flowing from the lake

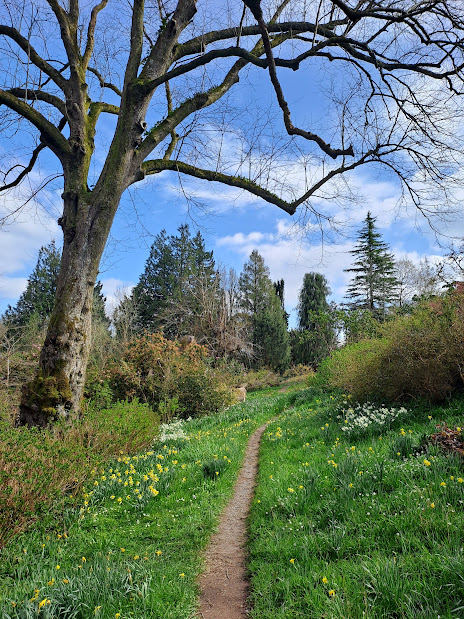
Path through the lime tree walk

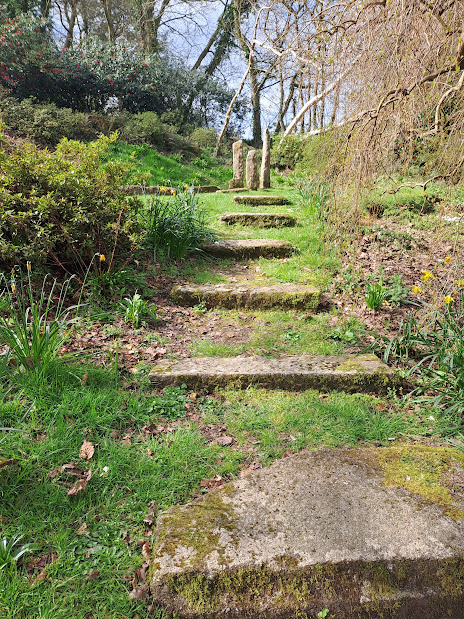
Path onto the magic stone circle
