= Axminster Rural District =

Former administrative unit in Devon, England

Coordinates: 50.781°N 3.000°W

Axminster Rural District is a former district council area based around Axminster, Devon. It was administered by Axminster Rural District Council. It was created in 1894 and abolished in 1974.
