= Buckerell =

Village in Devon, England

Coordinates: 50.7977°N 3.2476°W

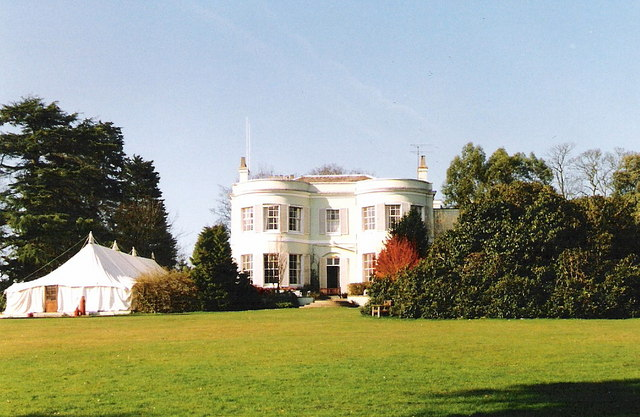
- The Deer Park Country House, near Buckerell.

- Location within Devon
- Population: 270
- Shire county: Devon
- Region: South West
- Country: England
- Sovereign state: United Kingdom
- Post town: Honiton
- Postcode district: EX14
- Dialling code: 01404
- Police: Devon and Cornwall
- Fire: Devon and Somerset
- Ambulance: South Western
- UK Parliament: Honiton and Sidmouth

Buckerell is a small village and civil parish in the East Devon district of Devon, England. The village is about 2.5 miles west of the nearest town, Honiton. In the 2001 census a population of 270 was recorded for the parish, which is surrounded clockwise from the north by the parishes of Awliscombe, Honiton, Gittisham, Feniton and Payhembury.

== History ==
The Church of St Mary and St Giles dates from the 13th or 14th century and has been designates as a Grade II* listed building. There is a richly-carved Chancel screen. There is a statue of Britannia by John Bacon, in memory of Admiral Samuel Graves and his wife.
