= St Thomas Rural District =

Former local government area in the UK

St. Thomas was a rural district, in the County of Devon, England from 1894 to 1974. The offices were in Southernhay East, inside the City of Exeter, but outside the County of Devon.

It was created by the Local Government Act 1894 based on the St. Thomas rural sanitary district, and covered an area entirely surrounding the City of Exeter, and also bordering Exmouth. It was named after the parish of St. Thomas the Apostle, which was an urban district in its own right, with offices opposite St Thomas Church in Cowick Street, until 1900 when it was annexed to Exeter.

The district remained in existence until 1974 when it was abolished by the Local Government Act 1972, and was split between the new districts of East Devon and Teignbridge. Alphington, Pinhoe and Topsham had already been transferred in 1966 to the City of Exeter.
