= Upottery =

Village in Devon, England

Coordinates: 50.863°N 3.135°W

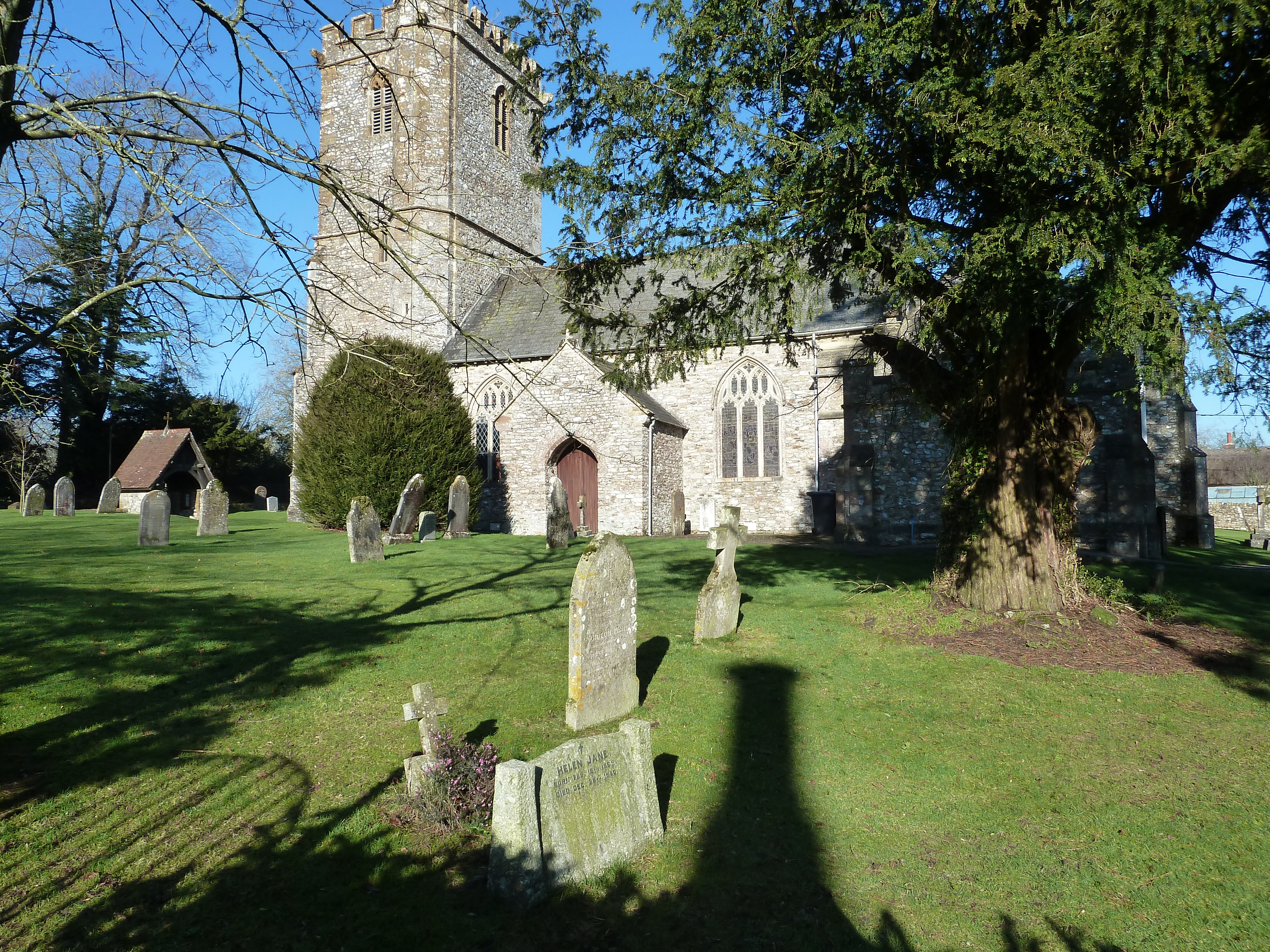
- Upottery church

- Location within Devon
- Area: 23.89 km^{2} (9.22 sq mi)
- Population: 701 (2011 census)
  - Density: 29/km^{2} (75/sq mi)
- District: East Devon
- Shire county: Devon
- Region: South West
- Country: England
- Sovereign state: United Kingdom
- Post town: Honiton
- Postcode district: EX14
- Dialling code: 01404
- Police: Devon and Cornwall
- Fire: Devon and Somerset
- Ambulance: South Western
- UK Parliament: Honiton and Sidmouth

Upottery (originally Up Ottery) is a rural village, civil parish and former manor in East Devon, England.

== Location ==
Upottery takes up both sides of the upper vale of the Otter which flows to the English Channel south of Ottery St Mary and is a clustered village.

Its northern limit forms the border with Somerset. Clockwise from which are the Devon parishes of Yarcombe, Stockland, Cotleigh, Monkton, Luppitt and Clayhidon.

== History ==
Parts of the parish church of St Mary the Virgin date from the 12th century. The Viscounts Portman, as in Portman Square and surrounding areas of London, which remain the family hands, held the manor house and main lands here for about two centuries but in 1934 inherited a property in Wiltshire which they substituted for this home, casting off local landholding also to other ownership, on sale.

The former World War II airfield of RAF Upottery is in the outer parts of the parish.

== Housing and demography ==
Housing type
Type	Number	Percentage
Whole house or bungalow: Detached	227	73.9%
Whole house or bungalow: Semi-detached	51	16.6%
Whole house or bungalow: Terraced (including end-terrace)	18	5.9%
Flat, maisonette or apartment	9	3.1%

Most, 81.6%, of housing is owned (with/without mortgage); the next largest category is 12.0% which is privately rented, next is socially rented which is 3.9% of the stock as residents identified in 2011. 7.8% of the 307 homes had (in 2011) no usual residents.

The United Kingdom Census 2011 recorded the population of the parish as 701.

== In media, literature and the arts ==
Fields and some houses featured in the 2001 television mini-series Band of Brothers.
