= Clyst St Lawrence =

Village and civil parish in Devon, England

- Village
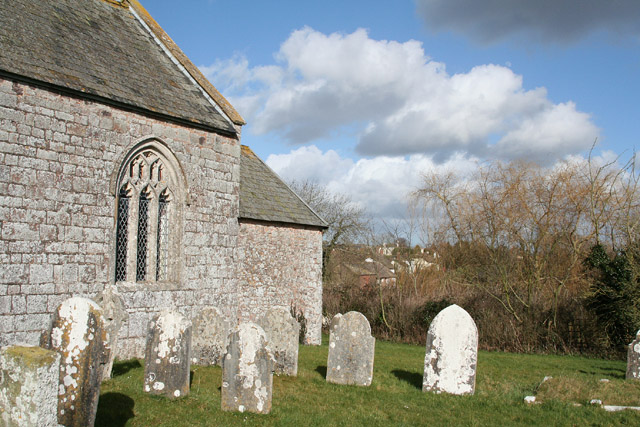
- The churchyard of the parish church

- Location within Devon Location within the United Kingdom
- Coordinates: 50.792°N 3.379°W
- Country: England
- County: Devon
- District: East Devon
- Civil parish: Clyst St Lawrence

Population (2001)
  - Total: 105
- Time zone: UTC+0:00 (GST)

Clyst St Lawrence is a village and civil parish in the East Devon district, in the county of Devon, England, about 8 miles north-east of the city of Exeter. Historically it formed part of Cliston Hundred. The parish is surrounded, clockwise from the north, by the parishes of Clyst Hydon, Whimple and the large parish of Broad Clyst. In 2001 its population was 105, little changed from the 113 people who lived there in 1901.

The parish church, which is dedicated to St Lawrence, was founded in 1203 or earlier and it retains its granite font of that date.
