= Bridestowe =

Village in Devon, England

Coordinates: 50.68519974°N 4.10470194°W

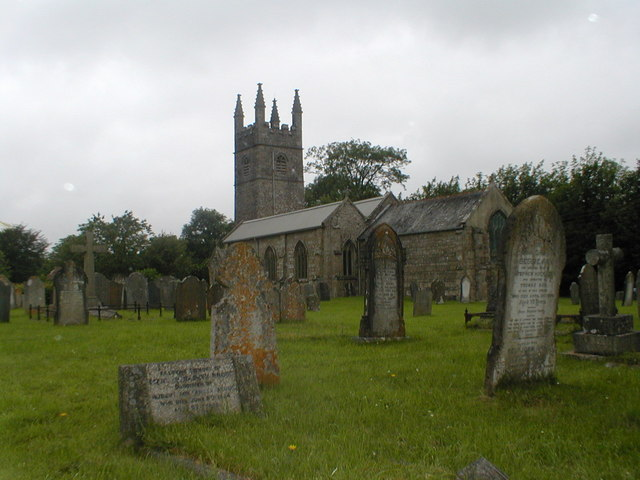
- St Bridget's Church, Bridestowe

- Location within Devon
- OS grid reference: SX 5141 8940
- District: West Devon
- Shire county: Devon
- Region: South West
- Country: England
- Sovereign state: United Kingdom
- Post town: Okehampton
- Postcode district: EX20
- Dialling code: 01837
- Police: Devon and Cornwall
- Fire: Devon and Somerset
- Ambulance: South Western
- UK Parliament: Torridge and Tavistock

Bridestowe (/ˈbrɪdɪstoʊ/) is a civil parish and village in the district of West Devon, Devon, England. The parish is surrounded clockwise from the north by the parishes of Bratton Clovelly, Sourton, Bridestowe and Sourton Common, Lydford, Lewtrenchard and Thrushelton.

The village is 6 miles south-west of Okehampton on the edge of Dartmoor and on the A30 main road. It has a primary school, pre-school, village stores and post office, a number of public houses and accommodation providers, Methodist chapel and village hall.

== Landmarks ==
The parish church, St Bridget's Church, is mostly 13th and 15th century, with a west tower and some fragments of Norman work. It is dedicated to the Irish Saint Bride or Bridget, who is depicted in one of the stained glass windows, and from whom the place-name is derived. The church's distinctive gateway is described in White's Directories as "a fine Norman arch".

The village contains the Georgian mansion Millaton House, the childhood home of Lord Carrington which served as a hospital run by American soldiers during the Second World War. Also within the parish are an Elizabethan mansion Great Bidlake, the seat of the Bidlake family since 1268, and disused mine-workings which once produced lead and copper.

Bridestowe railway station was opened in 1874 and closed in 1968, together with the stretch of line from Okehampton station to Bere Alston.

== Today ==
The town has a parish council which meets monthly. The local paper is the Bridestowe and Sourton Extra.

In 2021 the population of the parish was 656, compared with 457 in 1901. There is an electoral ward with the same name; its population at the 2011 census was 1610.
