= Stockland, Devon =

Village in Devon, England

Coordinates: 50.837°N 3.074°W

Stockland
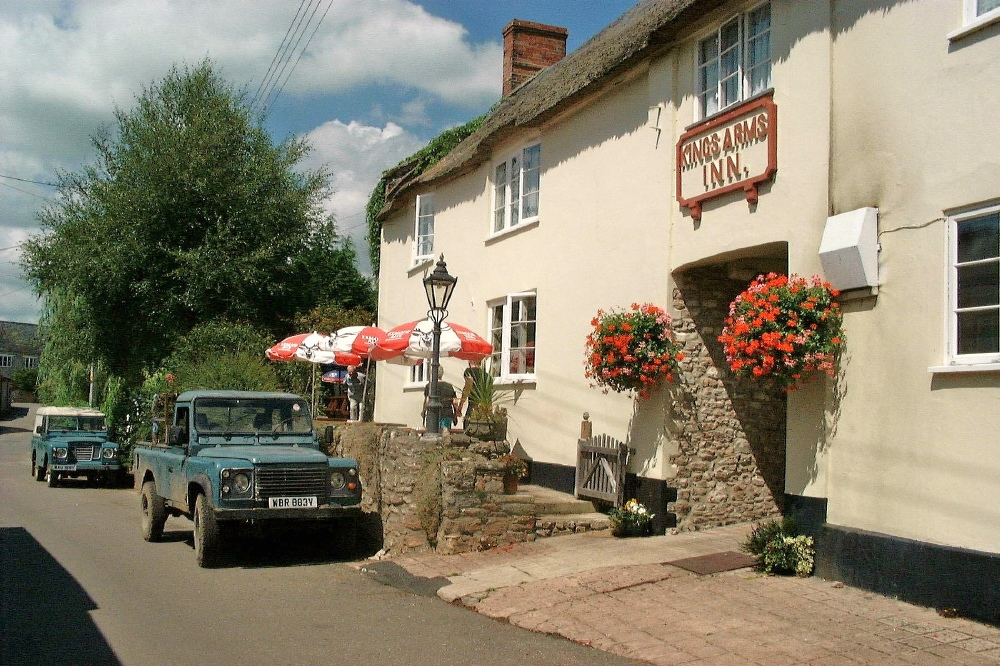
- The Kings Arms

- Location within Devon
- Shire county: Devon
- Region: South West
- Country: England
- Sovereign state: United Kingdom
- Post town: HONITON
- Postcode district: EX14
- Dialling code: 01404
- Police: Devon and Cornwall
- Fire: Devon and Somerset
- Ambulance: South Western
- UK Parliament: Honiton and Sidmouth

Stockland is a village and civil parish in Devon, close to the Somerset boundary. The parish is surrounded clockwise from the north by the parishes of Yarcombe, Membury, Dalwood, Widworthy, Offwell, Cotleigh and Upottery. Its nearest neighbouring towns are Honiton and Axminster, which are 6 miles (10 km) and 5 miles (8 km) away respectively. It has a population of around 600. The village is placed within the Blackdown Hills Area of Outstanding Natural Beauty. The Stockland parish had historically been an exclave of Dorset until the Counties (Detached Parts) Act 1844.

== Notable features ==
Stockland has a village hall where community events are held and is the location of the local pre-school. The village hall also includes a children's play area, cricket pitch and tennis court. The village hall is the location for the annual Stockland Fair held on May bank holiday. This fair was granted by King Henry III to the Manor of Stockland in 1252.

From 2016-2019 the village community conducted a campaign to protect their last remaining pub, the Kings Arms, from being developed mainly into housing with the loss of the skittle alley and most of the car park. It successfully culminated in acquisition by Stockland Community Pub Limited, a Community Benefit society, which now owns the freehold. Following a year of repair and refurbishment, the Kings Arms reopened to trade in late January 2020.

Stockland Primary School resides in a Victorian school house and provides education 4 to 11 year olds. Stockland Primary School has received excellent status in the past. An Ofsted inspection in 2007 gave it a Grade 1 'Outstanding' rating and it has received several achievements including coming in the top 50 Primary schools in the Sunday Times Parent Power study

Stockland has an Anglican church, St Michael and All Angels. The building itself was mainly built in the 15th century.
