= Tiverton Rural District =

Former local government area in Devon, England

Tiverton Rural District was a rural district within the county of Devon. It was abolished in 1974 and succeeded by Mid Devon District Council.
