= Deer Park Country House, Buckerell =

Country house hotel in Buckerell, Devon, England

Coordinates: 50.7943°N 3.2337°W

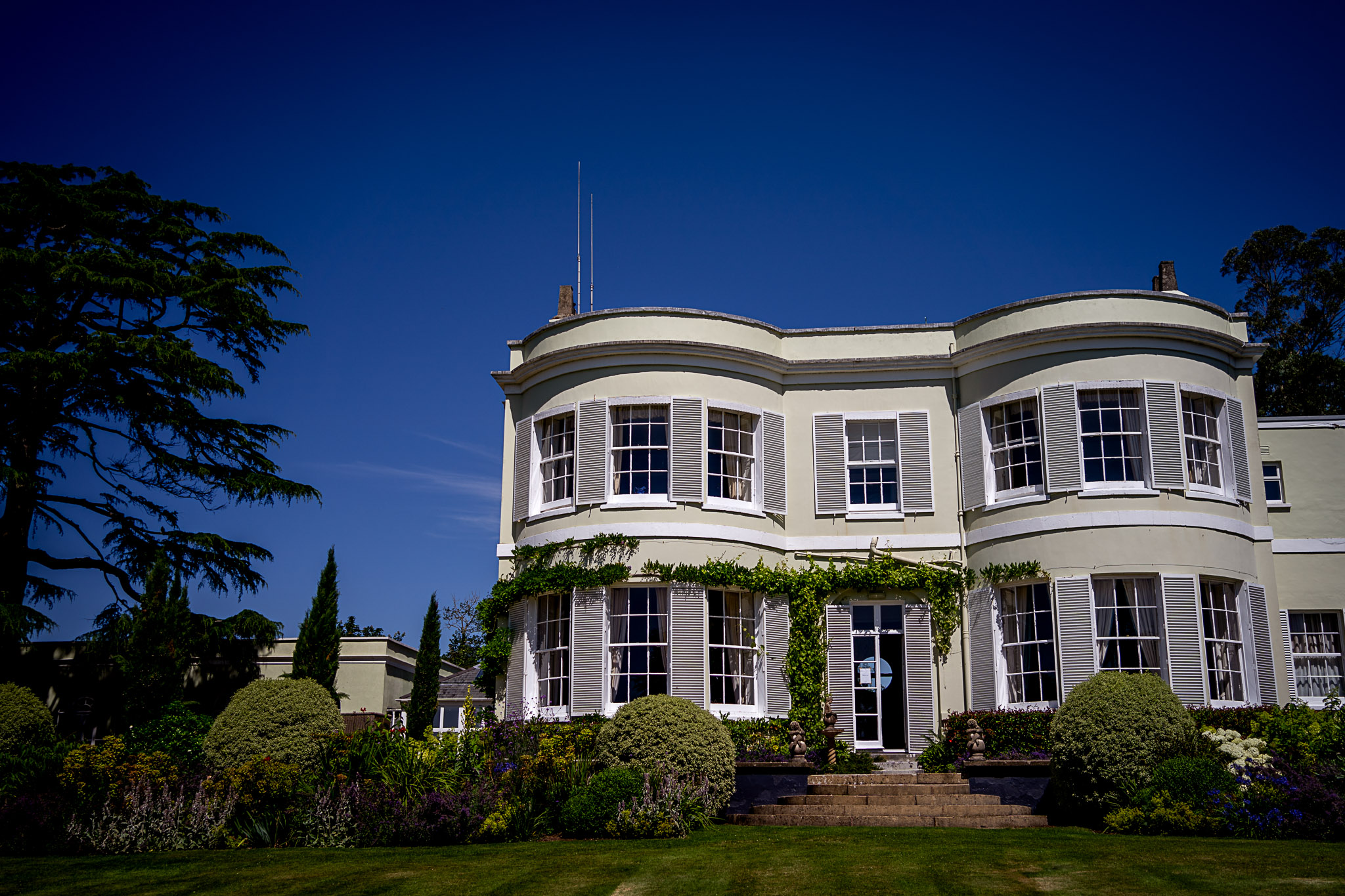
Deer Park Country House

Deer Park Country House near Honiton, Devon is a house of historical significance and is Grade II listed on the English Heritage Register. It was built in the early 1700s by a wealthy landowner and was the home of many notable people over the next two centuries. Today it is a venue for special events including conferences and weddings.

== Early history ==
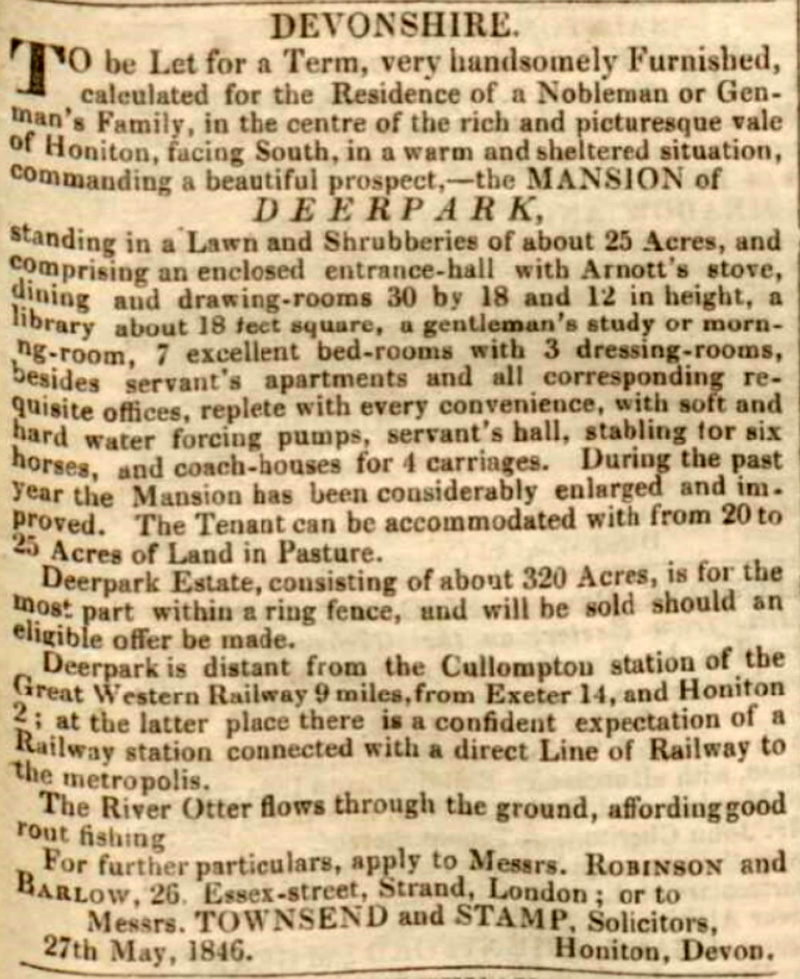
Rental notice for Deer Park in1846

Nicholas Fry (1676-1714) built the present house which is possibly a remodelling of an older residence that was on the site. He inherited the property in 1707 from his uncle Richard Fry. Therefore, it is most likely the house was constructed between 1707 and 1714.

Nicholas was born in 1676 in Devon. In 1704 he married Dorothy Haydon, daughter of Gideon Haydon of Cadhay. The couple had two children. Their son Henry Fry (1707-1772) inherited Deer Park in 1714 when Nicholas died. He married three times and was the last of the Fry family to own the property. When he died in 1772 he devised the house to his third wife Elizabeth Yonge who died in 1787. By 1797 the house was owned by Thomas Hunt Andrews.

Thomas Hunt Andrews (1766-1850) had inherited his uncle's fortune in 1789, so it may be this that enabled him to buy the property. By 1805 Arthur Lemuel Shuldham (1752-1839) was living at the house. In 1827 William Meade Smythe (1785-1866) was the owner of Deer Park.

William Meade Smythe (1785-1866) was born in 1785 in Muncaster, Cumbria. His father was William Smythe of Barbavilla Manor in Ireland. In 1815 he married Lady Isabella Howard (1791-1840) who was the sister of William Howard, 4th Earl of Wicklow.

In 1856 the Earl of Wicklow bought Deer Park from his brother in law William Meade Smythe and gave it to his only child Lady Frances Howard and her husband Colin Lindsay.

== Later residents ==
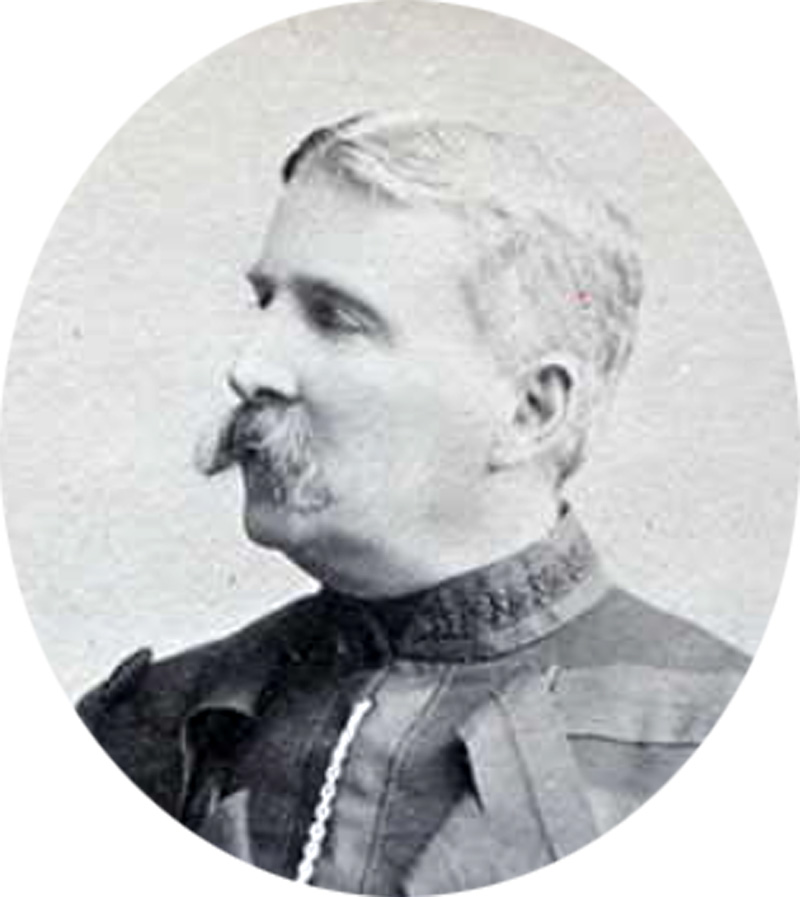
Walter Fell Smith

Colin Lindsay (1819-1892) who owned the house from 1856 until his death in 1892 was the son of Sir James Lindsay, 24th Earl of Crawford. In 1845 he married Lady Frances Howard (1821-1897) and the couple had seven children. The 1861 Census records the family living at Deer Park with a butler, a housekeeper, two ladies maids, and three other household servants. Colin died in 1892 and his wife Lady Frances continued to live at the house until her death in 1897. The property was inherited by their eldest son William Alexander Lindsay (1846-1926).

From about 1900 until 1922 the Fell-Smith family were the residents of Deer Park. Walter Fell Smith retired to the property and lived there for over twenty years until he died there aged 81. Before this he was Superintendent of the Police in Bengal and then Deputy Chief of Police in Manchester. He was described in his obituary as “having all the characteristics of the fine old English country squire.” Soon after his death in 1922 Robert Dand became the owner of the house.

Robert Dand (1876-1950) was an attorney. In 1920 the married Janet Mary Hebeler (née Scott) who was a widow. They lived at Deer park until about 1930 when it was purchased by the Parry family.

Edward Arthur Parry (1879-1946) was a barrister. In 1911 he married Angela Ida Harriet Scully who was the daughter of William Scully an Irishman who had made a vast fortune as a land developer in America. When he died in 1906 he left an estate of 50 million dollars which today would be about 1.5 billion dollars. He left most of this to the three surviving children of his second marriage one of whom was Angela.

The couple had three sons, one of whom John Edward Parry was awarded the Military Cross in 1942. Edward died in 1946 and shortly after the property was sold. In 1947 Deer Park opened as a hotel.
