= Monkton, Devon =

Village in Devon, England

Coordinates: 50.821580°N 3.1547332°W

Monkton
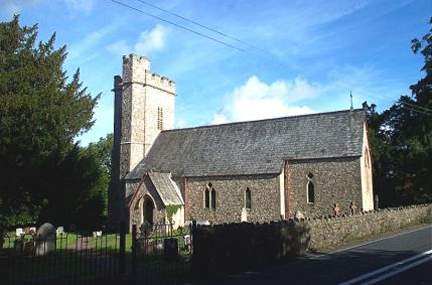
- Church of St Mary Magdalene

- Location within Devon
- Area: 5.0244 km^{2} (1.9399 sq mi)
- Population: 169 (2011 census)
  - Density: 34/km^{2} (88/sq mi)
- Civil parish: Monkton
- District: East Devon
- Shire county: Devon
- Region: South West
- Country: England
- Sovereign state: United Kingdom
- Post town: Honiton
- Postcode district: EX14
- Police: Devon and Cornwall
- Fire: Devon and Somerset
- Ambulance: South Western
- UK Parliament: Honiton and Sidmouth
- Website: http://monkton-devon.org/

Monkton is a village and civil parish on the River Otter, about 2 miles north east of Honiton railway station, in the East Devon district, in the county of Devon, England. In 2011 the parish had a population of 169. The parish touches Cotleigh, Upottery, Honiton, Offwell and Luppitt. The parish is in the Blackdown Hills Area of Outstanding Natural Beauty.

== Features ==
There are 5 listed buildings in Monkton.

== History ==
The name "Monkton" means 'Monks' farm/settlement' and is likely to have been of Ango-Saxon origin. The parish was historically in the Colyton hundred. On the 24th of March 1884 an area from Combe Raleigh parish was transferred to the parish. The transferred area contained 4 houses in 1891.
