= Barnstaple Rural District =

Former local government area in the UK

Coordinates: 51.08021°N 4.05405°W

- Rural district
- Population
  - 1901: 17,725
  - 1971: 28,835
- History
  - Created: 28 December 1894
  - Abolished: 31 March 1974
  - Succeeded by: North Devon
  - HQ: Barnstaple
- Contained within
  - County: Devon

Barnstaple Rural District was a rural district in the administrative county of Devon, England, from 1894 to 1974, covering a coastal area in the north of the county. Whilst the district was named after the town of Barnstaple and had its offices there, the district did not include the town itself.

The district was abolished in 1974, when the area became part of the district of North Devon.

== Origins ==
The district had its origins in the Barnstaple Poor Law Union, which had been created in 1835 covering Barnstaple itself and several surrounding parishes. In 1872 sanitary districts were established, giving public health and local government responsibilities for rural areas to the existing boards of guardians of poor law unions. The Barnstaple Rural Sanitary District therefore covered the area of the poor law union except for the three towns of Barnstaple, Ilfracombe and Lynton, which had their own urban authorities. The Barnstaple Rural Sanitary District was administered from Barnstaple Union Workhouse, which had been built in 1837 on Alexandra Road in Barnstaple.

Under the Local Government Act 1894, rural sanitary districts became rural districts from 28 December 1894. The Barnstaple Rural District Council held its first meeting on 28 December 1894 at the workhouse. George Christopher Davie of Bishop's Tawton was appointed the first chairman of the council, having already chaired the board of guardians for the previous six years.

== Premises ==
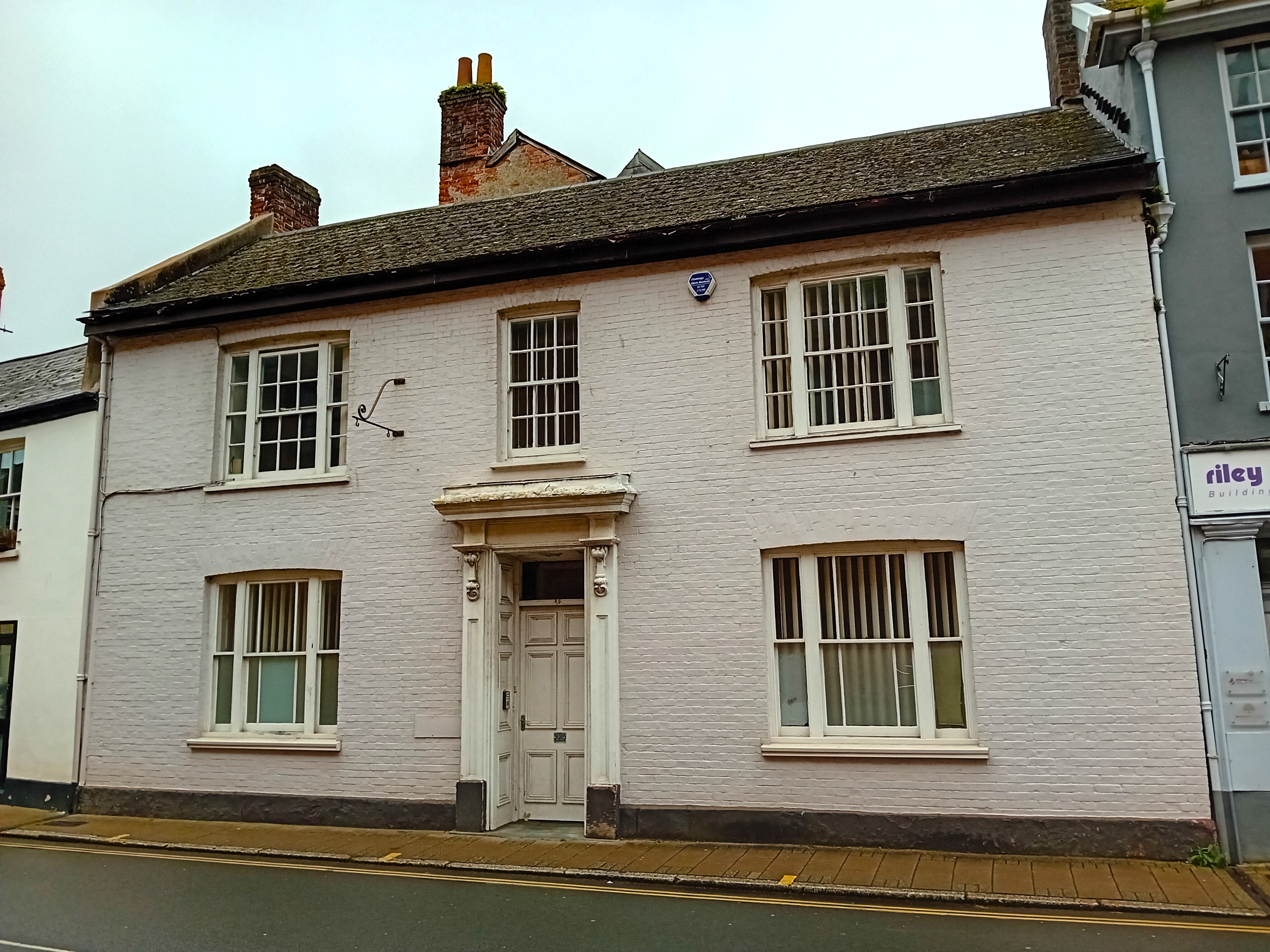
Red House, 23 Castle Street, Barnstaple: Council's offices 1911–1969

In 1911 the council moved its main offices to a converted late eighteenth century house called the Red House at 23 Castle Street in Barnstaple. Meetings continued to be held in the boardroom at the old workhouse until it was converted into the Alexandra Hospital on the creation of the National Health Service in 1948. The council then extended the Red House to incorporate a council chamber in 1950. The council remained based at the Red House until 1969 when it took offices in the new Barnstaple Civic Centre on North Walk, sharing the building with Barnstaple Town Council.

== Abolition ==
Barnstaple Rural District was abolished in 1974 under the Local Government Act 1972. The area was merged with the neighbouring South Molton Rural District and the borough of Barnstaple and urban districts of Ilfracombe and Lynton to become North Devon.
