= Clyst Hydon =

Village in Devon, England

Coordinates: 50°48′21″N 3°22′12″W

- Village and civil parish
- Interactive map of Clyst Hydon
- Country: England
- County: Devon
- District: East Devon

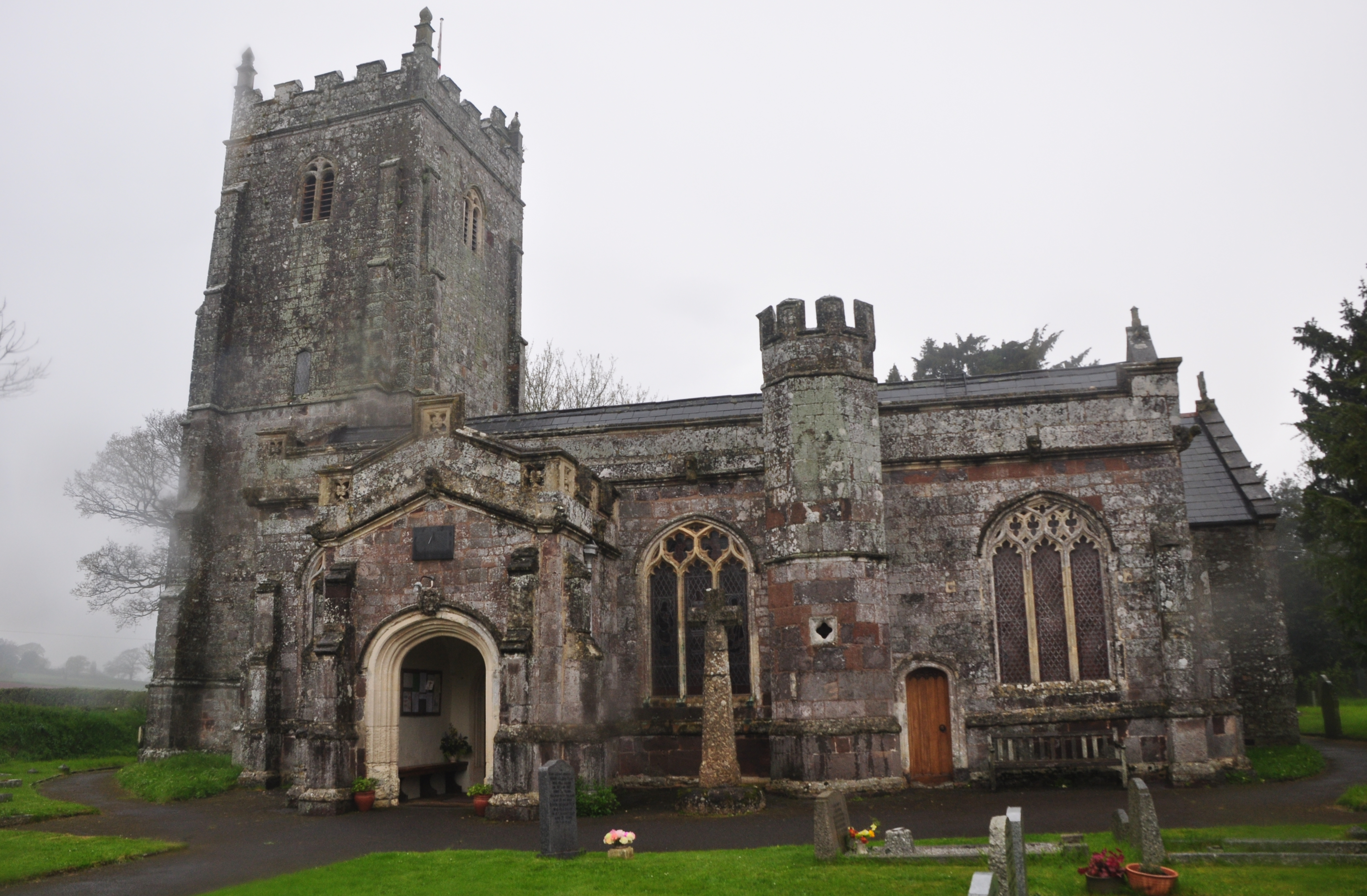
Clyst Hydon - St Andrews Church

Clyst Hydon is a village and civil parish in the county of Devon, England. It was in the Cliston Hundred and has a church dedicated to St Andrew. The parish is surrounded, clockwise from the north, by the parishes of Cullompton, Plymtree, Payhembury, Talaton, Whimple, Clyst St Lawrence and Broad Clyst.

The village is four miles from Cullompton. It has a primary school, Clyst Hydon Primary; other amenities include a pub/restaurant and a sports club.

From 1971 to 1974 the village was the site of an artists colony which published the radical Beau Geste Press, a small press that worked in the lineage of the Fluxus and mail art movements.

== Historic estates ==
Within the parish are situated various historic estates including:

- Aunk
