= Bridestowe and Sourton Common =

Civil parish in Devon, England

Coordinates: 50.6772°N 4.0522°W

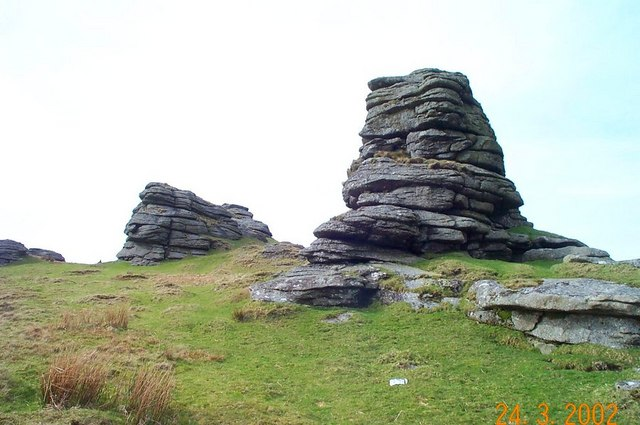
- Great Links Tor

- Location within Devon
- Civil parish: LCPs of Bridestowe and Sourton
- Shire county: Devon
- Region: South West
- Country: England
- Sovereign state: United Kingdom
- Post town: Exeter
- Postcode district: EX20
- Police: Devon and Cornwall
- Fire: Devon and Somerset
- Ambulance: South Western

Bridestowe and Sourton Common, also known as Common to Bridestowe and Sourton and Lands common to the Parishes of Bridestowe and Sourton, is a civil parish in the district of West Devon, Devon, England. It is surrounded by the parishes of Okehampton Hamlets, Dartmoor Forest, Lydford, Bridestowe and Sourton.

== History ==
It was formerly an extra-parochial area.
