= Stockleigh English =

Village in Devon, England

Coordinates: 50.84523°N 3.63592°W

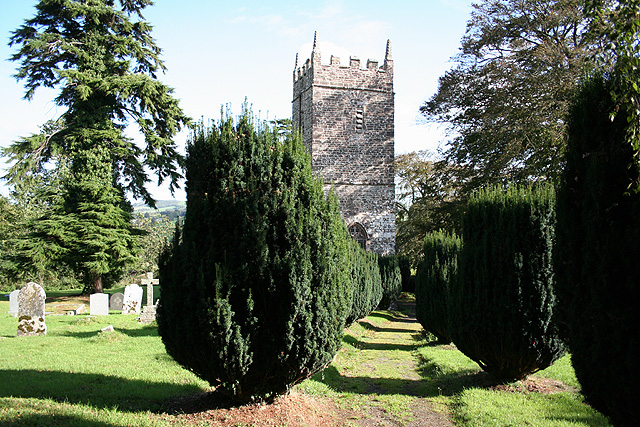
- St Mary's church, Stockleigh English

- Location within Devon
- Population: 63 (2001 UK Census)
- District: Mid Devon
- Shire county: Devon
- Region: South West
- Country: England
- Sovereign state: United Kingdom
- Police: Devon and Cornwall
- Fire: Devon and Somerset
- Ambulance: South Western
- UK Parliament: Central Devon

Stockleigh English is a village and civil parish in Devon, England. It has a 15th-century church, Saint Mary the Virgin, which was restored 1878–83.

Stockleigh Court in the parish is a grade II listed building which was the home of the Bellew family who lived at Stockleigh Court from the 16th to 20th century.
