= Poughill, Devon =

Village in Devon, England

Coordinates: 50.86°N 3.63°W

Poughill
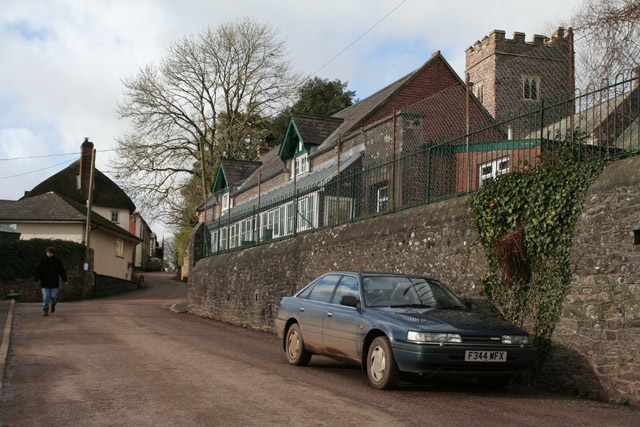
- Poughill village

- Location within Devon
- Population: 216 (2011 census)
- OS grid reference: SS8508
- Civil parish: Poughill
- District: Mid Devon
- Shire county: Devon
- Region: South West
- Country: England
- Sovereign state: United Kingdom
- Post town: CREDITON
- Postcode district: EX17
- Dialling code: 01363
- Police: Devon and Cornwall
- Fire: Devon and Somerset
- Ambulance: South Western
- UK Parliament: Central Devon

Poughill (/pɔɪl/ poyl) is a village and civil parish in the Mid Devon district, in the county of Devon, England. It lies 5 miles (8 km) north of Crediton. In 2011, the parish had a population of 216.

Anciently, Poughill was held by the Poughill or Poghill family and was recorded in the Domesday Book in 1086. The topynym, recorded in the Domesday Book as Pochehille, is either from the Old English pohha "pouch" and hyll "hill", meaning "hill by a pouch or hollow", or from a man named Pohha.

The historical map of Poughill (in 1945) shows a number of contour lines where land reaches 600 feet (180 m) above sea level. This variation in relief is shown today, particularly in the image of Poughill towards Cheriton Fitzpaine.

== Social class ==
83 households were recorded in Poughill in 2011 and 45 of these households were not deprived in any dimension. No houses were recorded to be deprived in either 3 or 4 dimensions however 28 households were deprived in 1 dimension and 10 households were deprived in 2 dimensions. In 2001, only 23 households had been recorded with no selected characteristic of deprivation and 5 households had selected characteristics of 3 dimension deprivation suggesting deprivation had been improved by 2011. Approximated social grades in 2001 recorded 19 residents, of 148 residents aged 16 and over in households, on state benefit, unemployed and/or lowest grade workers (in class E). 50 residents were in class 1 as people with supervisory, clerical, junior managerial/administrative/professional jobs. The highest social grade (AB) included 25 residents of Poughill who worked as higher and intermediate managerial/administrative/professional positions.

== Demographics ==
1841 saw the beginning of a large downward trend in the total population levels. In 1901 we see a 'pause' in the total population changing - in 1911 the total population has increased by 1 to 223. The next census data collection showed Poughill's total population had fallen lower than ever at the time, recorded at 154 residents in 1931 (-69) . A minimal rise was shown again, increasing the population back up to 165 residents however this positive up rise was reduced when the 1951 census data was collected and the lowest population levels for Poughill were collected. 147 residents were recorded, as shown on the total population graph.

There is a national school, with a small endowment from Pyncombe's charity; a charity of £1,013 a year for schools, small livings, and the poor. Out of the whole population, 39 of Poughill's residents were of school age in 2011. Census data from 2011 shows that residents aged 45–59 years made up the highest percent of the total population, accounting for 28.2%. The smallest percentage of the total population is 0.5% (residents aged 85–89 years). 2001 data shows the highest percentage of the total population to be 24.7% however this percent was due to those aged 30–44 years, unlike 2011.

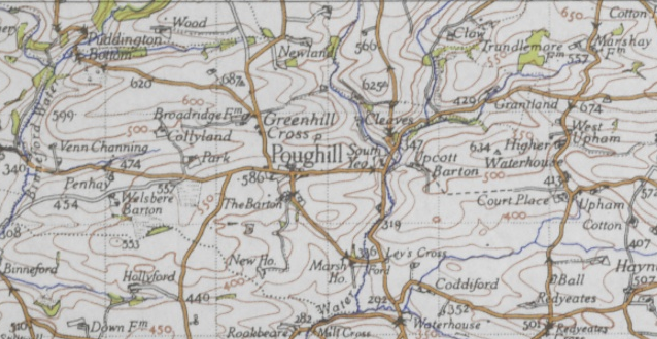
Historical Map of Poughill, 1945

According to the 2011 Census there were 109 males and 107 females living in the parish. As shown in the graph, Poughill's total population has varied since the 1800s. The graph shows a number of troughs and peaks with the highest peak being in 1841 when the population was recorded at 361.

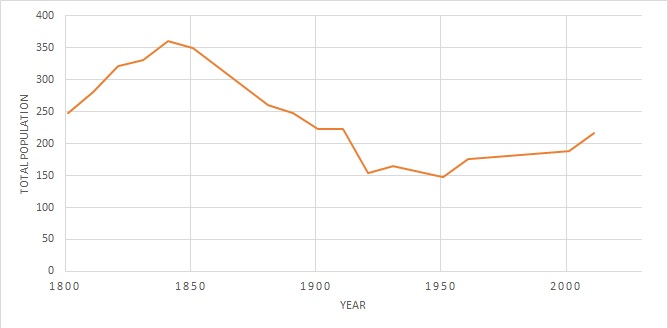
Total Population of Poughill Civil Parish, Devon, 1801-2011

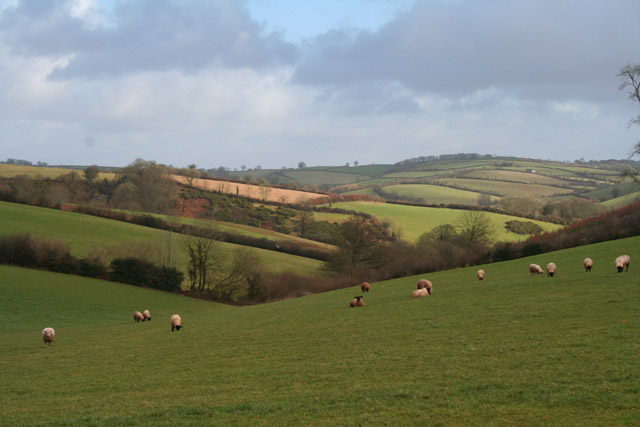
Poughill, towards Cheriton Fitzpaine parish

== Poughill Health Statistics ==
Way has more residents (3.85%) describing their health as very good than the national average for England.

== Religion ==
The 2001 Census showed 137 residents stating they were Christian. Whilst 37 residents stated they did not follow any religion, 15 residents of Poughill did not state their religion. Data regarding religion varied more in the 2011 census: total population had increased but the number of Christians in Poughill had decreased to 122 residents. 74 residents did not follow a religion and still 16 residents did not state their religion. The parish church, dedicated to St Michael, is a Grade I listed building. The church is early perpendicular English; consists of a double nave and chancel, with a tower; had formerly a chantry; and was thoroughly repaired in 1856.

== Housing ==
1841 shows the highest recorded number of 'total houses' in the Parish: 80 homes were recorded in that year's census. The 'total houses' count in 1951 is 40, this piece of data is the lowest recording of homes in Poughill and correlates with the total population being at its lowest. From the graph we can see that at the last reading, 1950, the total number of homes was rising. In 2011 total 'houses' were recorded at 83.

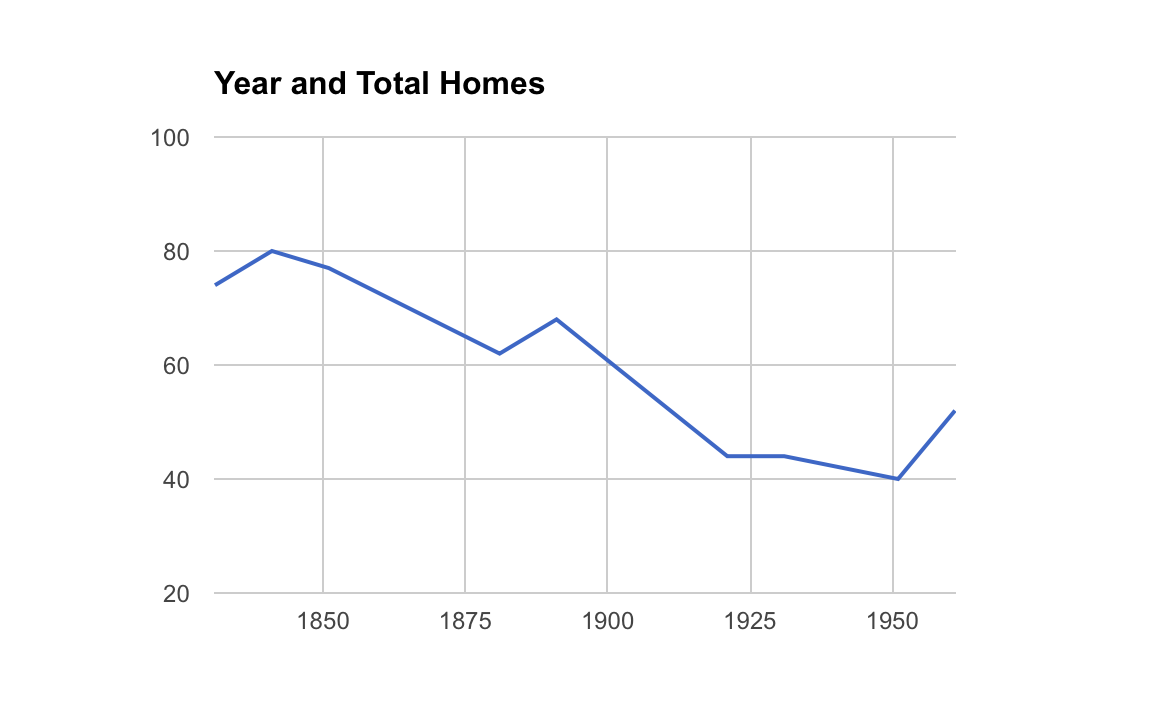
Total Homes, Ploughill

== Employment ==
Census data from 1831 suggests there were 7 active occupational categories in use during this time. With a small population of 325, the highest working occupational category contained only 36 residents. These residents were agricultural laborers. The second highest occupation was retail and handicrafts of which 23 residents worked in this area. No residents worked as servants or manufacturers. In 2011, census data revealed 13 active occupational categories although many of which only had one resident working within it. The highest working category noted in 2011 was in Agriculture, Forestry and Fishing with 15 residents working in this industry. This data shows, similarly to 1831, residents of Poughill don't tend to work in the manufacturing industry.

1881 occupational categories shows a large number of Poughill's population working in agriculture, suggesting land use in Poughill was mostly farmland. Data shows us that out of the 53 members of the community working in agriculture (as shown on the graph below), 52 of these workers were male. Many of the categories shown below on the graph have only a small number of workers attached to them whilst the second largest occupational category with 34 community members related to it is the 'unknown occupation' category. Similarly, there were 74 males and 71 females working in Poughill in this time period. This meant only 145 members of the Poughill community were working out of a total of 260 residents.

The working occupational categories in Poughill, 1881
