= Thelbridge =

Village in Devon, England

Coordinates: 50.8946°N 3.7226°W

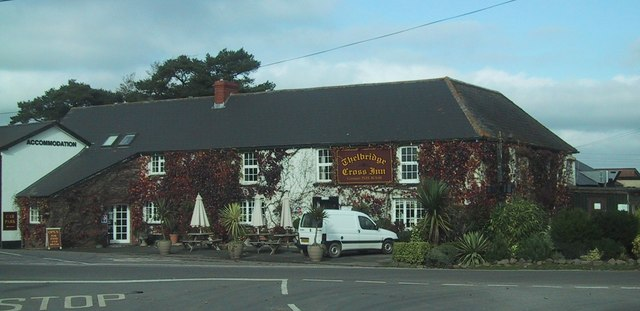
- Thelbridge Cross Inn

- Location within Devon
- Population: 337 (2011 UK Census)
- Civil parish: Thelbridge
- District: Mid Devon
- Shire county: Devon
- Region: South West
- Country: England
- Sovereign state: United Kingdom
- Post town: Crediton
- Police: Devon and Cornwall
- Fire: Devon and Somerset
- Ambulance: South Western
- UK Parliament: Central Devon

Thelbridge is a village and civil parish in the Mid Devon district, in the county of Devon, England. It is 5 miles NE of Morchard Road railway station and 8½ NNW of Crediton. In 2011, the parish had a population of 337.

The local church, St David's has medieval origins but was completely rebuilt in 1872–1875. It is grade II* listed and is in a Gothic style.

The Thelbridge Cross Inn, formerly a pub and now running as a B&B and private events venue, is a former coaching inn built of stone and cob and dates from the 1700s.
