= Feniton =

Village in Devon, England

Coordinates: 50.78661°N 3.28257°W

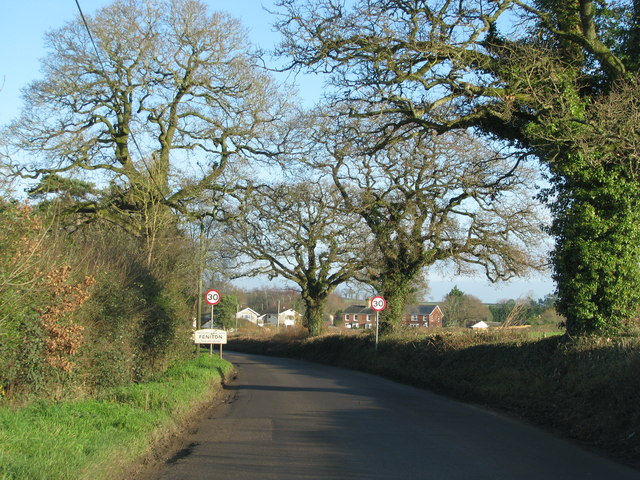
- Approaching Feniton

- Location within Devon
- Population: 1,568 (2011)
- OS grid reference: SY0999
- Civil parish: Feniton
- District: East Devon
- Shire county: Devon
- Region: South West
- Country: England
- Sovereign state: United Kingdom
- Post town: HONITON
- Postcode district: EX14
- Dialling code: 01404
- Police: Devon and Cornwall
- Fire: Devon and Somerset
- Ambulance: South Western
- UK Parliament: Honiton and Sidmouth

Feniton is a village and civil parish in East Devon in the English county of Devon. The village lies about 4 miles (6.4 km) west of Honiton, 3 miles (4.8 km) north of Ottery St Mary, and 2 miles (3.2 km) east of Talaton.

The parish of Feniton incorporates the hamlets of Colesworthy, Higher Cheriton and Curscombe. It covers an area of 644 hectares (1591 acres), and is surrounded, clockwise from the north, by the parishes of Payhembury, Buckerell, Gittisham, Ottery St Mary and Talaton. At the 2011 census the parish had a population of 1,806, increasing to 1,965 at the 2021 Census.

The 2012 draft East Devon Local Plan recorded 716 houses within the Built Up Area Boundary. Feniton is a major part of the electoral ward called "Feniton and Buckerell". The total population of this ward at the 2011 census was 2,274.

== The village ==
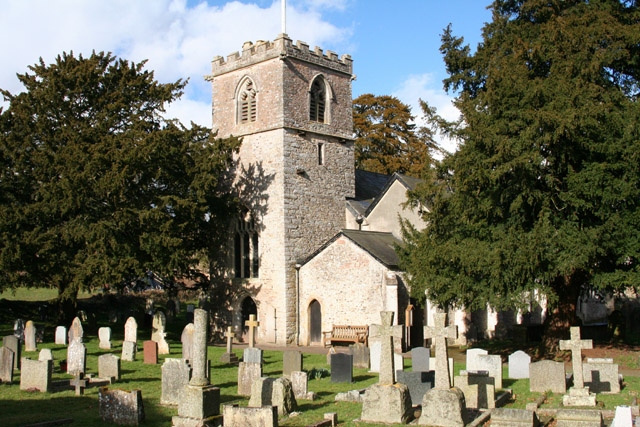
St Andrew's church

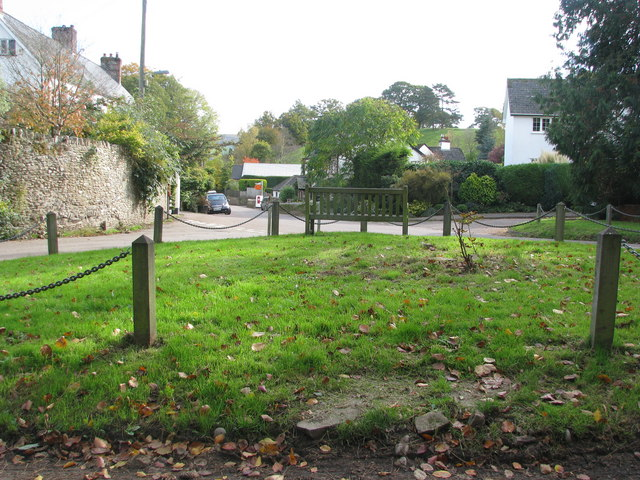
The triangular green at the centre of Feniton Court

The original village of Feniton contains the 13th-century Church of St Andrew, the post office, and a number of thatched cottages. The Wesley chapel which was built in 1850 is now disused and functions as an animal store.

The Vine Water, a tributary of the River Otter, runs through this part of the village and is generally believed to have given the village its name.

Feniton new village lies about 0.75 miles (1.21 km) west of the original village and is separated by open countryside. This area was formerly known as Sidmouth Junction and for many years consisted of just a few houses, a public house and a chapel, which were associated with the building and operation of the railway station of the same name. From the mid-1960s onwards, this area was transformed into Feniton new village by various medium-scale housing developments. These were accompanied by the building of Feniton Primary School, two village shops (one of which has since closed), and a playing field. In 1967, when the new village was taking shape, the original Sidmouth Junction railway station and its associated branch line were closed as part of the Beeching cuts. The station was reopened by British Rail in 1971 with the new name of Feniton. South Western Railway operate services from it to Exeter and London Waterloo.

In 1976, Feniton signed a twinning charter with the village of Louvigny in Normandy, France

More recently, a sports and social club, private dental practice, hairdresser and fast food takeaway have opened in this part of the village.

== Feniton today ==
In 2008 a number of residents were forced to move into the upper storeys of their houses to escape rising flood waters, and the village suffered again in November 2012: the village has its own Flood Warden scheme, and Devon County Council has estimated the cost of a flood defence scheme as in the region of £1.6 million.

Under East Devon District Council's draft Local Plan, the Council deemed that in the period up to 2026 it would be appropriate for Feniton to host another 35 houses. However, several developers have applied to build a large number of houses in and around the village.
