= Awliscombe =

Village in Devon, England

Coordinates: 50.816667°N 3.233333°W

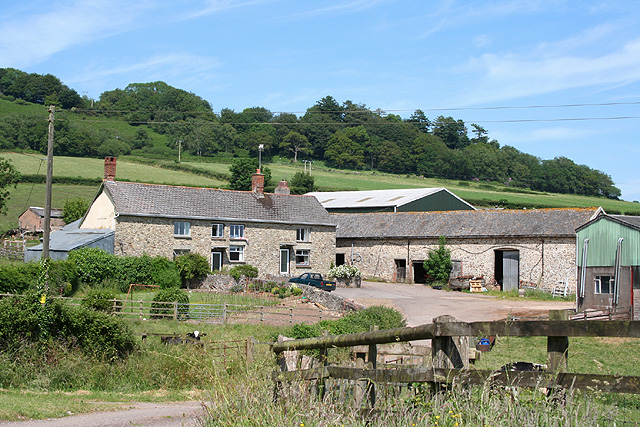
- Farm buildings, Awliscombe

- Location within Devon
- Population: 500 (2011)
- Civil parish: Awliscombe
- Shire county: Devon
- Region: South West
- Country: England
- Sovereign state: United Kingdom
- Post town: Honiton
- Postcode district: EX14
- Police: Devon and Cornwall
- Fire: Devon and Somerset
- Ambulance: South Western
- UK Parliament: Honiton and Sidmouth

Awliscombe is a village and civil parish in the East Devon district of Devon, England. The village is about two miles west of Honiton. The 2011 census showed a population of 500 for the parish, which is surrounded clockwise from the north by the parishes of Dunkeswell, Combe Raleigh, Honiton, Gittisham, Buckerell, Payhembury and Broadhembury.

In the centre of the village is the church of St Michael & All Angels and Awliscombe C of E Primary School.

The village has been described as having "a fine show of medieval stonework", and the church screen as being "one of the splendid survivals of the best craftsmanship of medieval Devon".
