= Combe Raleigh =

Village and civil parish in Devon, England

Coordinates: 50°48′53″N 3°11′42″W

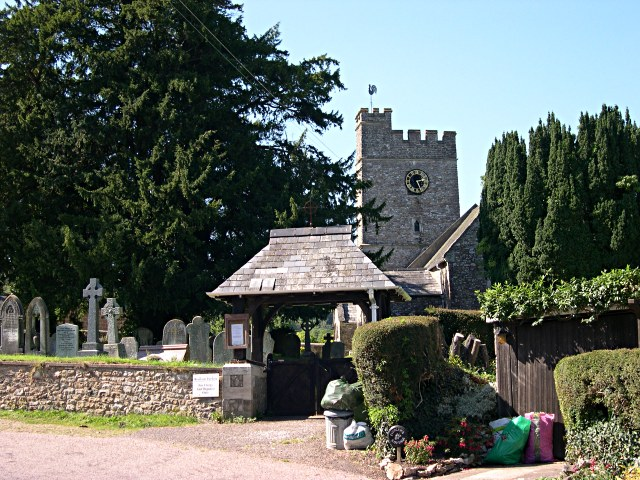
Combe Raleigh Church

Combe Raleigh (/kuːm ˈrɑːli/) is a village and civil parish in the county of Devon, England. The village lies about 1.5 miles north of the town of Honiton, and the parish is surrounded, clockwise from the north, by the parishes of Luppitt, Honiton, Awliscombe and Dunkeswell.

The word 'Combe' is of Celtic origin meaning 'valley' (the same as cwm) whilst the name 'Raleigh' comes from the Raleigh family's ownership of the village in the thirteenth century.

The 15th-century parish church (St. Nicholas) has six bells and its minister is shared with the nearby village of Awliscombe. The village has no shops.

In the past twenty to thirty years agriculture has declined considerably in the area, but the village does have three horticulture-based businesses. The most recently opened business being St. Isidore Agriculture Ltd.
