= Payhembury =

Village in Devon, England

Coordinates: 50.806911°N 3.29403°W

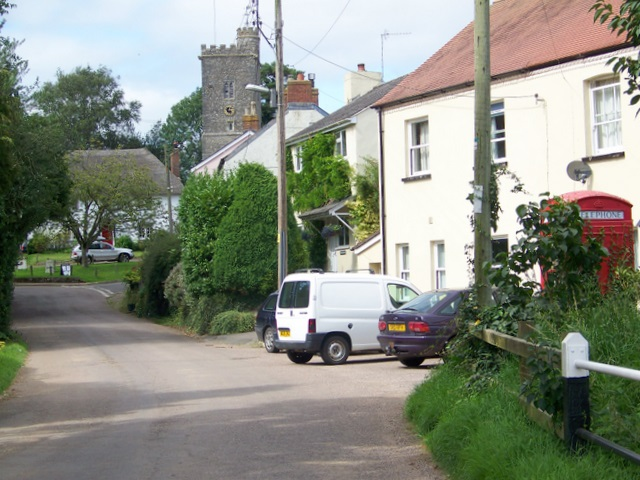
- Village of Payhembury

- Location within Devon
- Population: 790 (2021)
- Civil parish: Payhembury
- District: East Devon
- Shire county: Devon
- Region: South West
- Country: England
- Sovereign state: United Kingdom
- Post town: Honiton
- Postcode district: EX14
- Police: Devon and Cornwall
- Fire: Devon and Somerset
- Ambulance: South Western
- UK Parliament: Honiton and Sidmouth

Payhembury is a village and civil parish in the East Devon district of Devon, England.

== Geography ==
The village is about six miles west of Honiton. At the time of the 2021 consensus the parish had a population of ~790, and it is surrounded clockwise from the north by the parishes of Broadhembury, Awliscombe, Buckerell, Feniton, Talaton, Clyst Hydon and Plymtree. The parish includes the hamlets of Colestocks, Lower Cheriton, Tale, and Upton.

== Religion ==
The parish church is dedicated to St. Mary and was mostly built in the fifteenth century. It includes a stone arcade made of Beer Stone which has several shields including the arms of the Courtenay family, a coloured roof and altar rails from the reign of Queen Anne.
