= Northleigh =

Village in Devon, England

Coordinates: 50.758°N 3.142°W

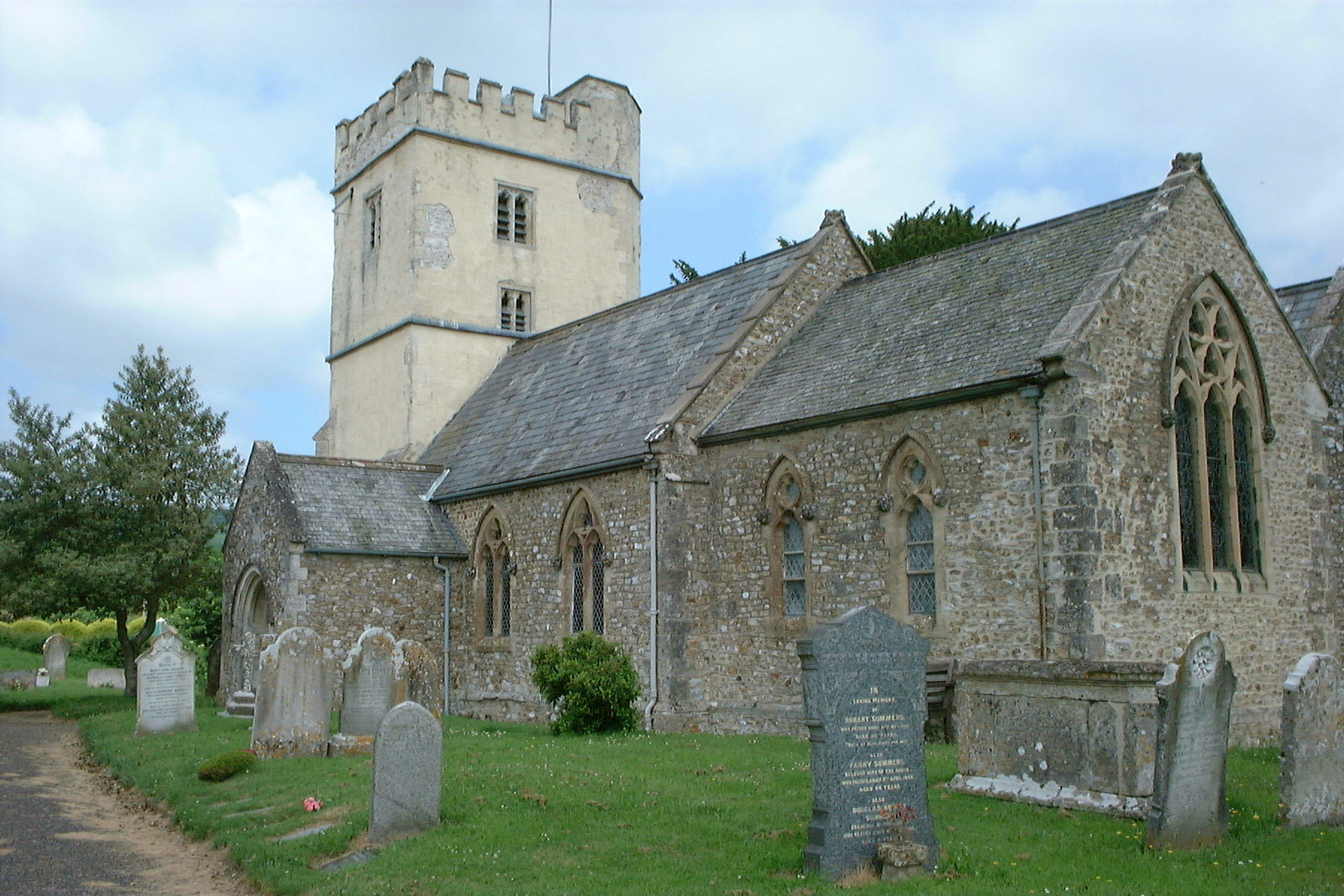
- St Giles' church

- Location within Devon
- OS grid reference: SY19589601
- Civil parish: Northleigh
- District: East Devon
- Shire county: Devon
- Region: South West
- Country: England
- Sovereign state: United Kingdom
- Post town: COLYTON
- Postcode district: EX24
- Dialling code: 01404
- Police: Devon and Cornwall
- Fire: Devon and Somerset
- Ambulance: South Western
- UK Parliament: Honiton and Sidmouth

Northleigh is a village and civil parish in the East Devon district of Devon, England. Its nearest town is Colyton, which lies approximately 3.5 miles (5.6 km) south-east from the village.

The church of St Giles was built in the Perpendicular style and has a western tower. Features of interest are the plain Norman south doorway, two screens – one to the chancel and one to the north chancel chapel – and the Jacobean pulpit. It is a Grade II* listed building.
