= Cotleigh =

Village in Devon, England

Coordinates: 50.81°N 3.13°W

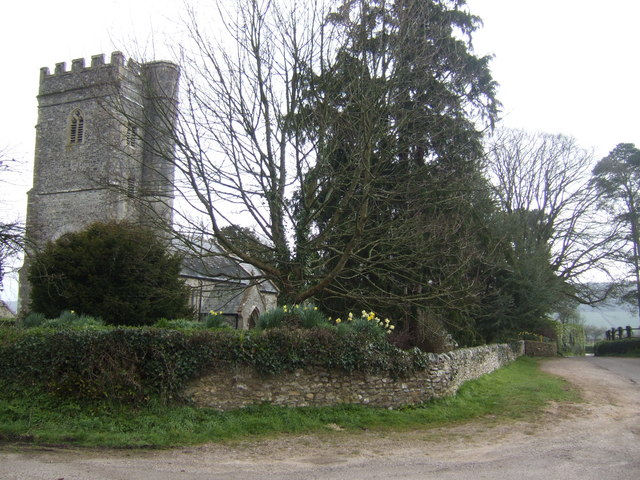
- St. Michael's church, Cotleigh

- Location within Devon
- OS grid reference: ST2002
- District: East Devon
- Shire county: Devon
- Region: South West
- Country: England
- Sovereign state: United Kingdom
- Post town: Honiton
- Postcode district: EX14
- Police: Devon and Cornwall
- Fire: Devon and Somerset
- Ambulance: South Western
- UK Parliament: Honiton and Sidmouth

Cotleigh is a village and civil parish near Honiton in Devon, England. It is surrounded clockwise from the north by the parishes of Upottery, Stockland, Offwell and Monkton. In the 19th century the rector of Cotleigh Devon was also rector of Barwick, Somerset.
