= Sheldon, Devon =

Village and civil parish in Devon, England

Coordinates: 50.870°N 3.253°W

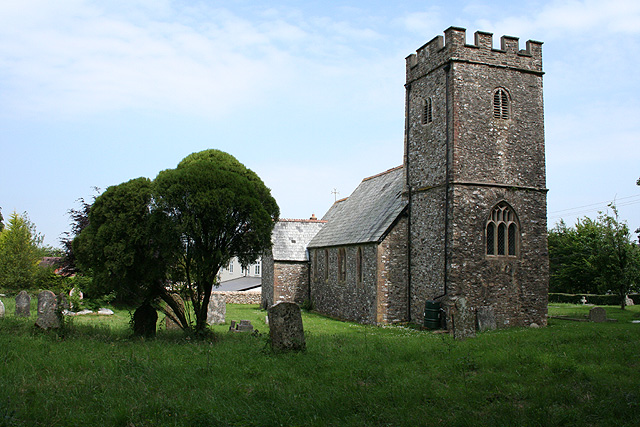
St James Church

Sheldon is a village and civil parish in the East Devon district of the county of Devon in England. It is located in the Blackdown Hills, 6.5 miles (10.5 km) north-northwest of Honiton. In the 2011 UK census, its population was recorded as 189 persons, with an average (mean) age of 45.

The parish church, the Church of St James the Greater, is a Grade II listed building with a Norman font and a 15th-century tower.
