= Brushford, Devon =

Village and civil parish in Devon, UK

Coordinates: 50°51′04″N 3°53′00″W

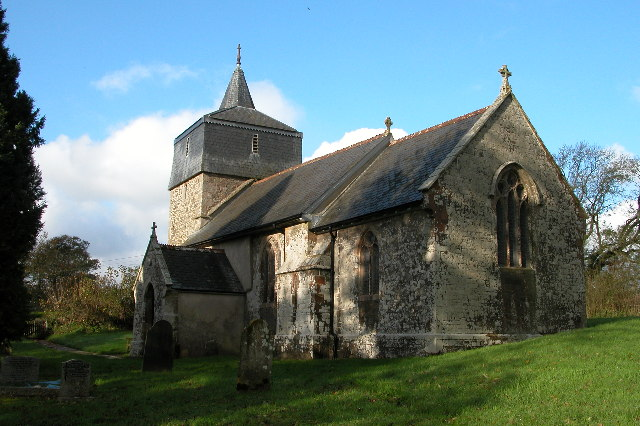
Brushford Church

Brushford is a village and civil parish in the Mid Devon district of Devon in England. According to the 2001 census it had a population of 59. The village is situated on the River Taw, and is about 12 miles north-east of Okehampton.

The church has a Norman Doorway, 16th century screen and Jacobean Pulpit.

- Brushford at GENUKI
- Brushford community page
