= Luppitt =

Village in Devon, England

Coordinates: 50°51′10″N 3°10′53″W

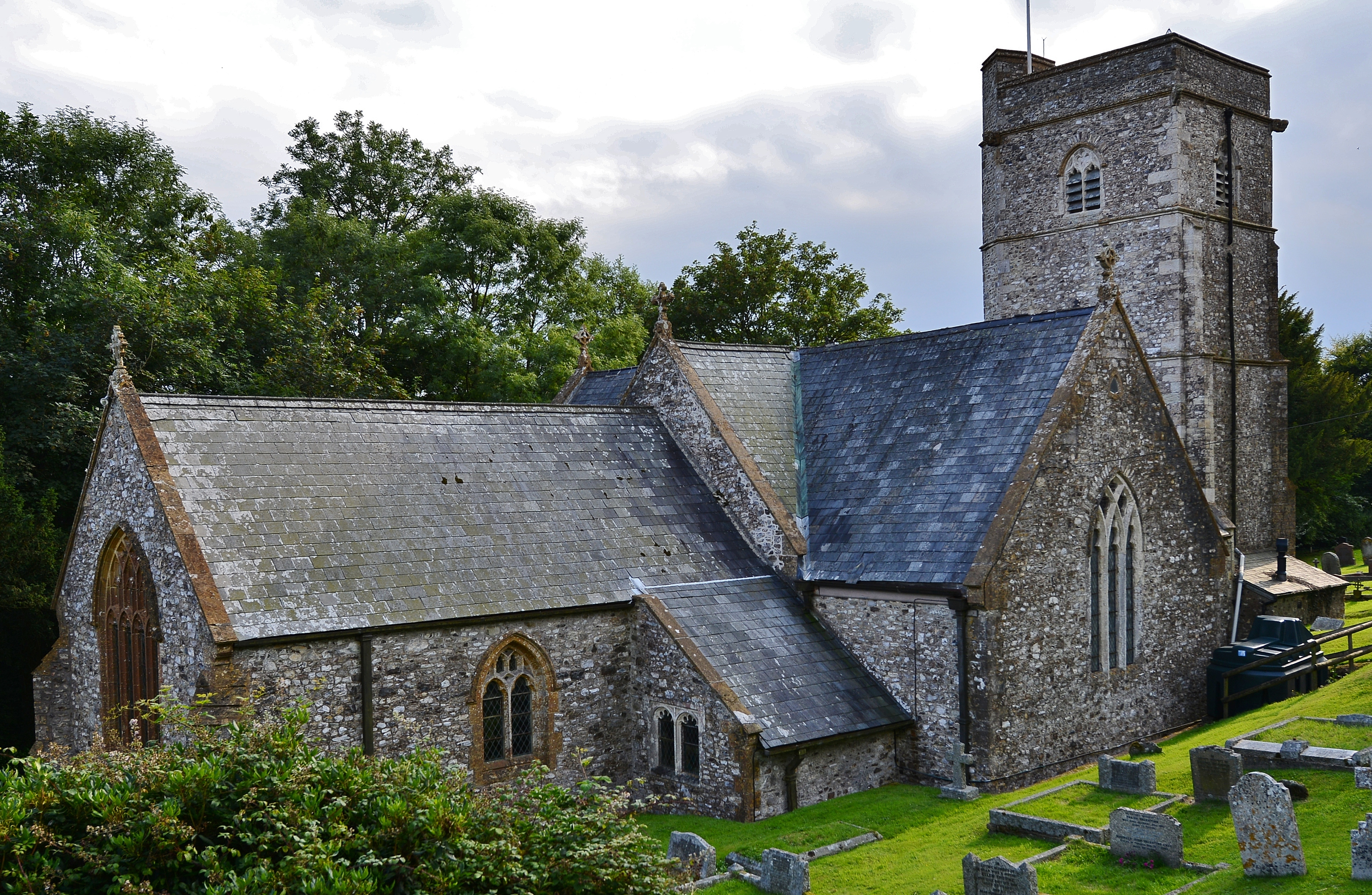
- Parish church of St Mary

- Location within Devon
- Population: 444 (2001 Census)
- OS grid reference: ST169066
- Civil parish: Luppitt
- District: East Devon
- Shire county: Devon
- Region: South West
- Country: England
- Sovereign state: United Kingdom
- Post town: Honiton
- Postcode district: EX14
- Dialling code: 01404
- Police: Devon and Cornwall
- Fire: Devon and Somerset
- Ambulance: South Western
- UK Parliament: Honiton and Sidmouth

Luppitt is a village and civil parish in East Devon situated about 4 miles (6 km) due north of Honiton.

St Mary's church, Luppitt, is a Grade I listed building. The font is probably Norman but may be late Anglo-Saxon; the bowl is covered with elaborate sculpture and the east face features a martyrdom.

The historian William Harris was preacher at the village's Presbyterian chapel from 1741 to 1770.

Towards the end of his life, the painter Robert Polhill Bevan (1865-1925) had a cottage called Marlpits on Luppitt Common, in which he painted a number of views of the neighbourhood.

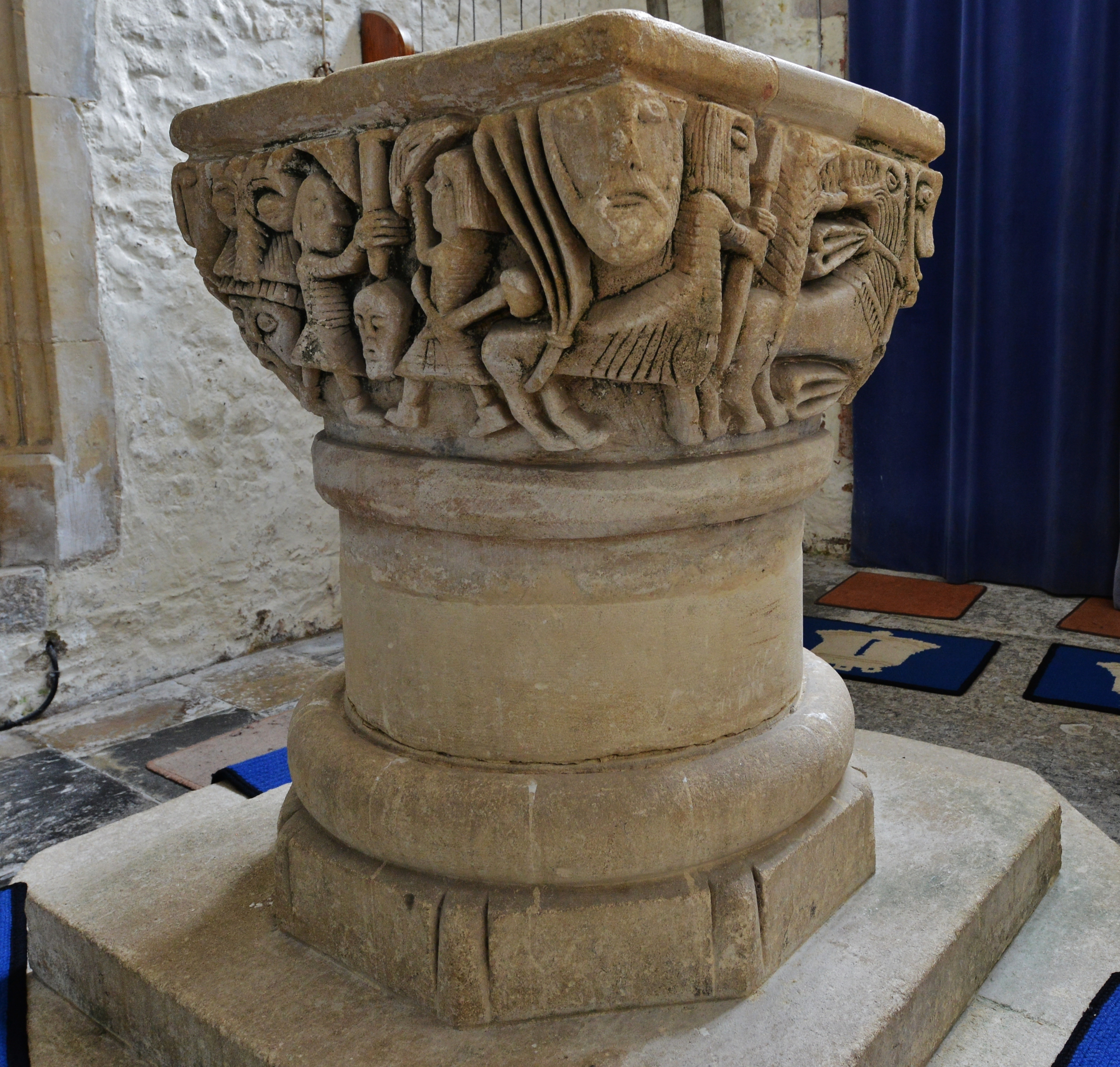
St Mary's Church, NE corner of the Norman font

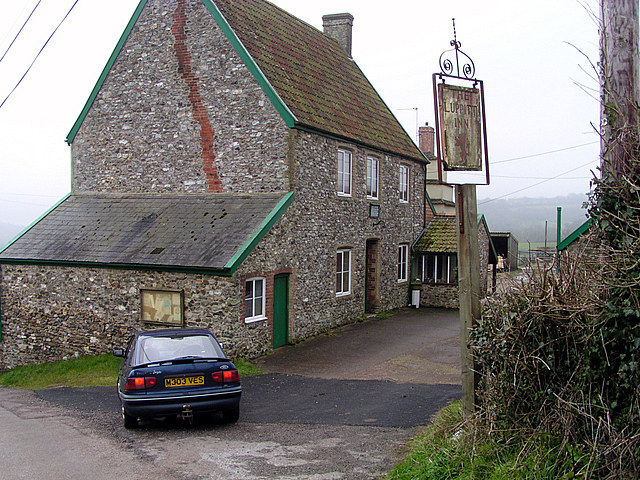
The Luppitt Inn

The Luppitt Inn is a public house on the Campaign for Real Ale's National Inventory of Historic Pub Interiors.

== Historic estates ==
- Mohuns Ottery, a seat of the Carew family, Barons Carew. See: William Henry Hamilton Rogers (1823-1913), Memorials of the West, Historical and Descriptive, Collected on the Borderland of Somerset, Dorset and Devon, Exeter, 1888, Chapter The Nest of Carew (Ottery-Mohun). See also: Vivian, Lt.Col. J.L., (Ed.) The Visitations of the County of Devon: Comprising the Heralds' Visitations of 1531, 1564 & 1620, Exeter, 1895, pp. 134–5, pedigree of Carew of Mohuns Ottery.
