= Diocese of Exeter =

Diocese of the Church of England

Coordinates: 50°43′21″N 3°31′46″W

Diocese of Exeter Dioecesis Exoniensis
- Coat of arms

- Flag

Location
- Ecclesiastical province: Canterbury
- Archdeaconries: Barnstaple, Exeter, Plymouth, Totnes

Statistics
- Parishes: 506
- Churches: 625

Information
- Cathedral: Exeter Cathedral
- Language: English

Current leadership
- Bishop: Mike Harrison, Bishop of Exeter
- Suffragans: James Grier, Bishop of Plymouth; Moira Astin, Bishop of Crediton
- Archdeacons: Douglas Dettmer, Archdeacon of Totnes; Andrew Beane, Archdeacon of Exeter; Verena Breed, Archdeacon of Barnstaple; Jane Bakker, Archdeacon of Plymouth

Website
- exeter.anglican.org

The Diocese of Exeter is a Church of England diocese covering the county of Devon. It is one of the largest dioceses in England. The Cathedral Church of St Peter in Exeter is the seat of the diocesan Bishop of Exeter. It is part of the Province of Canterbury. The diocesan bishop (Mike Harrison) is assisted by two suffragan bishops, the Bishop of Crediton and the Bishop of Plymouth. The See of Crediton was created in 1897 and the See of Plymouth in 1923.

== History ==
The Diocese of Crediton was created out of the Diocese of Sherborne in AD 909 to cover the area of Devon and Cornwall. Crediton was chosen as the site for its cathedral, possibly due it having been the birthplace of Saint Boniface and also the existence of a monastery there.

In 1046, Leofric became the Bishop of Crediton: following his appointment he decided that the see should be moved to the larger, more culturally significant and defensible walled town of Exeter. In 1050, King Edward the Confessor authorised that Exeter was to be the seat of the bishop for Devon and Cornwall and that a cathedral was to be built there for the bishop's throne. Thus, Leofric became the last diocesan Bishop of Crediton and the first Bishop of Exeter.

The diocese remained unchanged until 1876, when the former Archdeaconry of Cornwall became the independent Diocese of Truro.

== Organisation ==
=== Bishops ===
The Bishop of Exeter is Mike Harrison; James Grier as Bishop suffragan of Plymouth; and Moira Astin as Bishop suffragan of Crediton. The provincial episcopal visitor (for parishes in this diocese – among twelve others in the western part of the Province of Canterbury – which do not accept the ordination of women as priests, since 1994) is the Bishop suffragan of Oswestry (for traditional Anglo-Catholics), and Rod Thomas, Bishop of Maidstone (for conservative evangelicals); they are licensed as honorary assistant bishops in the diocese.

There are three former bishops licensed as honorary assistant bishops in the diocese:

- 2005–present: Richard Hawkins, retired former Bishop suffragan of Plymouth and of Crediton, lives in Whipton.
- 2010–present: Martin Shaw, a retired former Bishop of Argyll and the Isles, lives in Exeter itself.
- 2018–present: Mark Rylands, former Bishop of Shrewsbury, lives in Ashburton

=== Archdeaconries and deaneries ===
The diocese is divided into four archdeaconries. The Bishop suffragan of Crediton generally oversees the Archdeaconries of Barnstaple and Exeter and the Bishop suffragan of Plymouth the Archdeaconries of Plymouth and Totnes.

The following mergers of deaneries have taken place:

- the deaneries of Tiverton and Cullompton merged in 2012 to form the deanery of Tiverton & Cullompton
- the deaneries of Devonport, Moorside and Sutton merged in 2015 to form the deanery of Plymouth City.

Diocese	Archdeaconries	Rural Deaneries	Paid clergy	Churches	Population	People/clergy	People/church	Churches/clergy
Diocese of Exeter	Archdeaconry of Exeter (est. bef. 1083)	Deanery of Aylesbeare	11	23	58,471	5,315	2,542	2.09
Diocese of Exeter	Archdeaconry of Exeter (est. bef. 1083)	Deanery of Cadbury	5	36	23,413	4,683	650	7.2
Diocese of Exeter	Archdeaconry of Exeter (est. bef. 1083)	Deanery of Christianity	21*	27*	114,781	5,466	4,251	1.29
Diocese of Exeter	Archdeaconry of Exeter (est. bef. 1083)	Deanery of Honiton	11	38	45,324	4,120	1,193	3.45
Diocese of Exeter	Archdeaconry of Exeter (est. bef. 1083)	Deanery of Kenn	5	25	44,834	8,967	1,793	5
Diocese of Exeter	Archdeaconry of Exeter (est. bef. 1083)	Deanery of Ottery	5.8	22	29,911	5,157	1,360	3.79
Diocese of Exeter	Archdeaconry of Exeter (est. bef. 1083)	Deanery of Tiverton & Cullompton	13.2	40	51,389	3,893	1,285	3.03
Diocese of Exeter	Archdeaconry of Totnes (est. bef. 1140)	Deanery of Moreton	6	21	24,363	4,061	1,160	3.5
Diocese of Exeter	Archdeaconry of Totnes (est. bef. 1140)	Deanery of Newton Abbot & Ipplepen	6	19	52,299	8,717	2,753	3.17
Diocese of Exeter	Archdeaconry of Totnes (est. bef. 1140)	Deanery of Okehampton	5	27	21,108	4,222	782	5.4
Diocese of Exeter	Archdeaconry of Totnes (est. bef. 1140)	Deanery of Torbay	18	23	131,539	7,308	5,719	1.28
Diocese of Exeter	Archdeaconry of Totnes (est. bef. 1140)	Deanery of Totnes	11	28	34,237	3,112	1,223	2.55
Diocese of Exeter	Archdeaconry of Totnes (est. bef. 1140)	Deanery of Woodleigh	8	30	23,116	2,890	771	3.75
Diocese of Exeter	Archdeaconry of Barnstaple (est. bef. 1143)	Deanery of Barnstaple	15	27	65,804	4,387	2,437	1.8
Diocese of Exeter	Archdeaconry of Barnstaple (est. bef. 1143)	Deanery of Hartland	5	20	35,882	7,176	1,794	4
Diocese of Exeter	Archdeaconry of Barnstaple (est. bef. 1143)	Deanery of Holsworthy	4	21	11,676	2,919	556	5.25
Diocese of Exeter	Archdeaconry of Barnstaple (est. bef. 1143)	Deanery of Shirwell	5	23	11,477	2,295	499	4.6
Diocese of Exeter	Archdeaconry of Barnstaple (est. bef. 1143)	Deanery of South Molton	8	31	15,767	1,971	509	3.88
Diocese of Exeter	Archdeaconry of Barnstaple (est. bef. 1143)	Deanery of Torrington	8	32	17,860	2,233	558	4
Diocese of Exeter	Archdeaconry of Plymouth (est. 1918)	Deanery of Ivybridge	5	10	22,779	4,556	2,278	2
Diocese of Exeter	Archdeaconry of Plymouth (est. 1918)	Deanery of Plymouth City	33	42	261,382	7,921	6,223	1.27
Diocese of Exeter	Archdeaconry of Plymouth (est. 1918)	Deanery of Tavistock	12	30	31,519	2,627	1,051	2.5
Total/average			221	595	1,128,931	5,108	1,897	2.69

*including Cathedral

== Coat of arms ==
The arms of the diocese are Gules two keys in saltire Or a sword hilt downwards in pale Argent with hilt Or surmounted by a mitre. The charges are emblems of Saints Peter (keys) and Paul (sword) who are the patron saints of the cathedral.

== List of churches ==
Last fully updated 5 October 2018.

=== Outside deanery structures ===
Benefice	Churches	Link	Clergy	Population served	Ref
Cathedral	Cathedral Church of St Peter, Exeter		Dean: Jonathan Greener; Treasurer: Michael Williams; Canon Residentiary: Becky Totterdell; Precentor: James Mustard; Chancellor: Christopher Palmer; Priest Vicar: David Gunn-Johnson; Priest Vicar: Ian Morter	38	

=== Deanery of Aylesbeare ===
Benefice	Churches	Link	Clergy	Population served	Ref
Aylesbeare (Blessed Virgin Mary), Clyst St George, Clyst St Mary, Farringdon, Woodbury with Exton, and Woodbury Salterton – White Cross Mission Community	Blessed Virgin Mary, Aylesbeare; St Mary, Clyst St Mary; St George, Clyst St George; SS Petrock & Barnabas, Farringdon; Holy Trinity, Woodbury Salterton; St Andrew, Exton; St Swithun, Woodbury		Vicar: Sidney Humphries; Curate: Chris Cant	6,443	
Broadclyst (St John the Baptist), Clyst Honiton, Pinhoe, Rockbeare and Sowton – Clyst Mission Community	St John the Baptist, Broadclyst; Holy Evangelist, Killerton (?); St Michael & All Angels, Clyst Honiton; St Michael & All Angels, Pinhoe; Pinhoe Hall Church; SS Mary & Andrew, Rockbeare; St Michael & All Angels, Sowton		Team Rector: Elizabeth Slater; Team Vicar: Bernard Lane	8,600	
Budleigh Salterton (St Peter), East Budleigh with Bicton, and Otterton – Raleigh Mission Community	St Peter, Budleigh Salterton; All Saints, East Budleigh; St Michael, Otterton		Vicar: Martin Jacques; Curate: Pennie Hartopp; NSM: Karen Young	6,901	
Littleham (St Margaret) with Lympstone – Littleham cum Exmouth with Lympstone Mission Community	SS Margaret & Andrew, Littleham; Holy Trinity, Exmouth; Nativity of the Blessed Virgin Mary, Lympstone		Team Rector: James Hutchings; Team Vicar: Benedict Cambridge; Curate: Huw Ryden; NSM: Maureen Douglas; NSM: Lesley Holman	11,875	
Withycombe Raleigh (St John the Evangelist) (St John in the Wilderness) (All Saints) – Withycombe Raleigh Mission Community	All Saints, Exmouth; St John in the Wilderness, Exmouth; St John the Evangelist, Withycombe Raleigh		Team Rector: Robert Sellers; Team Vicar: Stephen Hoyle	24,562	

=== Deanery of Cadbury ===
Benefice	Churches	Link	Clergy	Population served	Ref
Bow (St Bartholomew) with Broad Nymet	St Bartholomew, Bow^{1}		Rector/Vicar: Vacant	2,083	
Colebrooke (St Andrew)	St Andrew, Colebrooke^{1}		Rector/Vicar: Vacant	2,083	
Zeal Monachorum (St Peter)	St Peter, Zeal Monachorum^{1}		Rector/Vicar: Vacant	2,083	
Brampford Speke (St Peter), Cadbury, Newton St Cyres, Poltimore, Rewe, Stoke Canon, Thorverton and Upton Pyne – Netherexe Mission Community	St Peter, Brampford Speke; St Michael & All Angels, Cadbury; SS Cyr & Julitta, Newton St Cyres; St Mary the Virgin, Huxham; St Mary the Virgin, Poltimore; St John the Baptist, Netherexe; St Mary the Virgin, Rewe; St Mary Magdalene, Stoke Canon; St Thomas of Canterbury, Thorverton; Our Lady, Upton Pyne		Rector: Katie Cross; NSM: Sue Sheppard	4,226	
Crediton (Holy Cross) (St Lawrence) Shobrooke and Sandford with Upton Hellions – Crediton Mission Community	Holy Cross & St Mary, Crediton		Rector: Vacant; Curate: Paul Fillery; Curate: Helen Drever	10,778	
Crediton (Holy Cross) (St Lawrence) Shobrooke and Sandford with Upton Hellions – Crediton Mission Community	St Lawrence, Crediton; St Luke, Posbury; Holy Trinity, Yeoford; Beacon Church, New Buildings; St Swithin, Sandford; St Mary the Virgin, Upton Hellions; St Swithin, Shobrooke		Rector: Vacant; Curate: Paul Fillery; Curate: Helen Drever	10,778	
Creedy, North: Cheriton Fitzpaine, Woolfardisworthy, Kennerley, Washford Pyne, Puddington, Poughill, Stockleigh English, Morchard Bishop, Stockleigh Pomeroy, Down St Mary, Clannaborough, Lapford, Nymet Rowland, and Coldridge	St Matthew, Cheriton Fitzpaine^{2}; St Petrock, Clannaborough^{1}; St Matthew, Coldridge^{1}; St Mary the Virgin, Down St Mary^{1}; St Boniface, Knowle^{1}; St John the Baptist, Kennerleigh^{2}; St Thomas of Canterbury, Lapford^{1}; St Mary, Morchard Bishop^{1}; St Bartholomew, Nymet Rowland^{1}; St Michael & All Angels, Poughill^{2}; St Thomas a Becket, Puddington^{2}; St Mary the Virgin, Stockleigh English^{2}; St Mary the Virgin, Stockleigh Pomeroy^{2}; St Peter, Washford Pyne^{2}; St Mary, Woolfardisworthy East^{2}		Priest-in-Charge: Kingsley Cross; Team Vicar: Lindsey Starrs	6,326	

^{1}part of the North Creedy West Mission Community ^{2}part of the North Creedy East Mission Community

=== Deanery of Christianity ===
Benefice	Churches	Link	Clergy	Population served	Ref
Alphington (St Michael and All Angels), Shillingford St George and Ide – Alphington Mission Community	St Michael & All Angels, Alphington		Rector: Mike Partridge; Curate: Helen Sherlock	5,495	
Alphington (St Michael and All Angels), Shillingford St George and Ide – Alphington Mission Community	St Ida, Ide		Rector: Mike Partridge; Curate: Helen Sherlock	5,495	
Alphington (St Michael and All Angels), Shillingford St George and Ide – Alphington Mission Community	St George, Shillingford St George		Rector: Mike Partridge; Curate: Helen Sherlock	5,495	
Exeter (St David) (St Michael and All Angels) – Exeter St David Mission Community	St David, Exeter		Vicar: Nigel Guthrie; Curate: Christopher Durrant; Hon. Curate: Peter Lee	10,845	
Exeter (St David) (St Michael and All Angels) – Exeter St David Mission Community	St Michael & All Angels, Mount Dinham		Vicar: Nigel Guthrie; Curate: Christopher Durrant; Hon. Curate: Peter Lee	10,845	
Exeter (St James) – Exeter St James Mission Community	St James, Exeter		Rector: Henry Pryse	9,127	
Exeter (St Leonard with Holy Trinity) – Exeter St Leonard Mission Community	St Leonard, Exeter		Rector: Simon Austen; Assoc. Rector: Chris Keane; Curate: Paul Sutton	5,562	
Exeter (St Mark)^{1}	St Mark, Exeter		Priest-in-Charge: Tanya Hockley-Still	12,496	
Exeter St Matthew with St Sidwell	St Matthew, Exeter; St Sidwell's Chapel		Rector: Ed Hodges (from 22 July 2019)		
Whipton (St Boniface)^{1}	St Boniface, Whipton; Holy Trinity, Whipton		Priest-in-Charge: John Byatt	10,765	
Exeter Holy Trinity – Exeter Trinity Mission Community	Trinity Church Exeter (2003)		Vicar: Jonny Elvin; Curate: Phill Brokenshire	3,419	
Exeter, Central (St Martin) (St Mary Arches) (St Olave) (St Pancras) (St Petrock) (St Stephen) – Central Exeter Mission Community	St Mary Arches, Exeter; St Olave, Exeter; St Pancras, Exeter; St Petrock, Exeter; St Stephen, Exeter		Hon. Priest-in-Charge: Sheila Swarbrick	937	
Exwick (St Andrew)^{2}	St Andrew, Exwick		Priest-in-Charge: Jeremy Bird	6,057	
Exeter (St Thomas the Apostle) (Emmanuel) (St Andrew) (St Philip)^{2}	St Thomas the Apostle, Exeter		Team Rector: Dave Nixon; Team Vicar: Charles Keay	19,175	
Heavitree (St Michael and All Angels) (St Lawrence) and St Mary Steps – Heavitree Mission Community	St Michael & All Angels, Heavitree; St Mary Steps, Exeter; St Lawrence, Heavitree		Team Rector: Robin Eastoe; Team Vicar: Jolyon Seward; Curate: Alexander Hobbs; NSM: Andrew Johnson	23,246	
Topsham (St Margaret) and Wear – Topsham & Countess Wear Mission Community	St Margaret, Topsham; St Luke, Countess Wear		Vicar: Louise Grace; Curate: Peter Ingerslev; NSM: Juliet Horwood	7,619	
Exeter Network Church – Exeter Network Church Mission Community	Exeter Network Church		Minister (PTO): Jon Soper	N/A	

^{1}part of the East Exeter Mission Community ^{2}part of the West Exe Mission Community

=== Deanery of Honiton ===
Benefice	Churches	Link	Clergy	Population served	Ref
Axminster (St Mary), Chardstock, All Saints, Combpyne with Rousdon and Membury – Axe Valley Mission Community	St Mary, Axminster; All Saints, All Saints; Holy Cross, Woodbury; St Andrew, Chardstock; St Mary the Virgin, Combe Pyne; St John the Baptist, Membury		Team Rector: Vacant	8,809	
Broadhembury (St Andrew the Apostle and Martyr), Dunkeswell, Luppitt, Plymtree, Sheldon, and Upottery – Dunkeswell Mission Community	St Andrew, Apostle & Martyr, Broadhembury; St Nicholas, Dunkeswell; St Mary, Luppitt; St John the Baptist, Plymtree; St James the Greater, Sheldon; St Mary the Virgin, Upottery		Rector: John Hayhoe	4,367	
Colyton (St Andrew), Musbury, Southleigh and Branscombe – Holyford Mission Community	St Andrew, Colyton; St Winifred, Branscombe; St Michael, Colyford (1889); St Michael, Musbury; St Lawrence, Southleigh		Rector: Fr Steven Martin	4,458	
Honiton (St Michael) (St Paul), Gittisham, Combe Raleigh, Monkton, Awliscombe and Buckerell – Honiton Mission Community	St Michael, Honiton; St Paul, Honiton; St Michael & All Angels, Awliscombe; SS Mary & Giles, Buckerell; St Nicholas, Combe Raleigh; St Michael, Gittisham		Team Rector: Sue Roberts; Team Vicar: Vacant	12,888	
Kilmington (St Giles), Stockland, Dalwood, Yarcombe and Shute – Five Alive Mission Community	St Giles, Kilmington; St Peter, Dalwood; St Michael, Shute; St Mary at the Cross, Whitford; St Michael & All Angels, Stockland; St John the Baptist, Yarcombe		Priest-in-Charge: Simon Holloway	2,970	
Offwell (St Mary the Virgin), Northleigh, Farway, Cotleigh and Widworthy – Offwell Mission Community	St Mary the Virgin, Offwell; St Michael & All Angels, Cotleigh; St Michael & All Angels, Farway; St Giles, Northleigh; St Cuthbert, Widworthy		Priest-in-Charge: Vacant	1,287	
Seaton (St Gregory) and Beer – Coastal Mission Community	St Gregory, Seaton; St Michael, Beer		Vicar: Jeremy Trew; Curate: Simon Hitchcock	8,410	
Uplyme (St Peter and St Paul) with Axmouth – Undercliff Mission Community	SS Peter & Paul, Uplyme		Rector: Vacant	2,135	
Uplyme (St Peter and St Paul) with Axmouth – Undercliff Mission Community	St Michael, Axmouth		Rector: Vacant	2,135	

=== Deanery of Kenn ===
Benefice	Churches	Link	Clergy	Population served	Ref
Christow (St James), Ashton, Bridford, Dunchideock, Dunsford and Doddiscombsleigh – Teign Valley and Haldon Hill Mission Community	St James, Christow		Vicar: Vacant	2,758	
Christow (St James), Ashton, Bridford, Dunchideock, Dunsford and Doddiscombsleigh – Teign Valley and Haldon Hill Mission Community	St John the Baptist, Ashton; St Thomas a Becket, Bridford; St Michael, Doddiscombsleigh; St Michael & All Angels, Dunchideock; St Mary, Dunsford		Vicar: Vacant	2,758	
Dawlish (St Gregory), Cofton and Starcross – Holiday Coast Mission Community	St Gregory, Dawlish; St Mary, Cofton; St George, Holcombe; St Paul, Starcross		Rector: Dallas Ayling; Curate: Tim Collins; NSM: Christine Curd; NSM: John Teed	14,945	
Exminster (St Martin), Kenn, Kenton with Mamhead, and Powderham – Five Red Churches Mission Community	St Martin, Exminster		Rector: John Williams; Hon. Curate: Peter Dawkes	5,977	
Exminster (St Martin), Kenn, Kenton with Mamhead, and Powderham – Five Red Churches Mission Community	St Andrew, Kenn		Rector: John Williams; Hon. Curate: Peter Dawkes	5,977	
Exminster (St Martin), Kenn, Kenton with Mamhead, and Powderham – Five Red Churches Mission Community	All Saints, Kenton		Rector: John Williams; Hon. Curate: Peter Dawkes	5,977	
Exminster (St Martin), Kenn, Kenton with Mamhead, and Powderham – Five Red Churches Mission Community	St Clement, Bishop & Martyr, Powderham		Rector: John Williams; Hon. Curate: Peter Dawkes	5,977	
Tedburn St Mary (St Mary), Cheriton Bishop, Whitestone with Oldridge and Holcombe Burnell – North Kenn Mission Community	St Mary, Tedburn St Mary; St Mary, Cheriton Bishop; St John the Baptist, Holcombe Burnell; St Thomas, Oldridge; St Catherine, Whitestone (St John the E?)		Vicar: Martin Wood	3,425	
Teignmouth (St James) (St Michael the Archangel), Ideford with Luton, Ashcombe and Bishopsteignton – Haldon Mission Community	St James, Teignmouth; St Michael, Teignmouth; St Nectan, Ashcombe; St John the Baptist, Bishopsteignton; St Mary the Virgin, Ideford; St John, Luton		Team Rector: Roderick Withnell; Team Vicar: Vacant; NSM: Val Atkinson	17,729	

=== Deanery of Ottery ===
Benefice	Churches	Link	Clergy	Population served	Ref
Ottery St Mary (St Mary the Virgin), Alfington, West Hill, Tipton St John, Venn Ottery, Newton Poppleford, Harpford, Colaton Raleigh, Payhembury, Feniton and Escot – Otter Vale Mission Community	St Mary the Virgin, Ottery St Mary		Team Rector: Stephen Weston; Team Vicar: Mark Ward; Team Vicar: David Carrington; NSM: Richard Allen; NSM: Malcolm Dick; Hon. Curate: Ann Turner; Hon. Curate: John Pangbourne	13,545	
Ottery St Mary (St Mary the Virgin), Alfington, West Hill, Tipton St John, Venn Ottery, Newton Poppleford, Harpford, Colaton Raleigh, Payhembury, Feniton and Escot – Otter Vale Mission Community	SS James & Anne, Alfington; St John the Baptist, Colaton Raleigh; SS Philip & James, Escot; St Andrew, Feniton; St Gregory the Great, Harpford; St Luke, Newton Poppleford; St Edward the Confessor, Wiggaton; St Mary the Virgin, Payhembury; St John, Tipton; St Gregory, Venn Ottery; St Michael the Archangel, West Hill		Team Rector: Stephen Weston; Team Vicar: Mark Ward; Team Vicar: David Carrington; NSM: Richard Allen; NSM: Malcolm Dick; Hon. Curate: Ann Turner; Hon. Curate: John Pangbourne	13,545	
Sidmouth (St Nicholas with St Giles), Woolbrook, Salcombe Regis, Sidbury with Sidford, and All Saints Sidmouth – Sid Valley Mission Community	SS Giles & Nicholas, Sidmouth; SS Mary & Peter, Salcombe Regis; SS Giles & Peter, Sidbury; St Peter, Sidford; All Saints, Sidmouth; St Francis of Assisi, Woolbrook		Team Rector: Vacant; Team Vicar: David Caporn; NSM: Annita Denny	13,651	
Whimple (St Mary), Talaton, Clyst St Lawrence and Clyst Hydon – Churches4All Mission Community	St Mary, Whimple; St Andrew, Clyst Hydon; St Lawrence, Clyst St Lawrence; St James the Apostle, Talaton		Rector: Chris Martin; Curate: Marc Kerslake	2,715	

=== Deanery of Tiverton & Cullompton ===
Benefice	Churches	Link	Clergy	Population served	Ref
Bampton (St Michael and All Angels), Morebath, Clayhanger, Petton and Huntsham – Hukeley Mission Community	St Michael & All Angels, Bampton; St Peter, Clayhanger; All Saints, Huntsham; St George, Morebath; St Petrock, Petton		Vicar: Charles Wheeler	2,424	
Bradninch (St Disen)	St Disen, Bradninch		Priest-in-Charge: Olly Mears; Curate: Chris Martin (see above)	2,208	
Cullompton (St Andrew) (Langford Chapel)	St Andrew, Cullompton		Rector: Edward Hobbs; Curate: Russ Morgan; Curate: Olly Mears (see above)	8,528	
Hemyock (St Mary) with Culm Davy, Clayhidon and Culmstock – Upper Culm Valley Mission Community	St Mary, Hemyock; St Mary's Chapel, Culm Davy; St Andrew, Clayhidon; All Saints, Culmstock		Priest-in-Charge: Vacant	3,369	
Sampford Peverell (St John the Baptist), Uplowman, Holcombe Rogus, Hockworthy, Burlescombe and Halberton with Ash Thomas – Sampford Peverell Team Mission Community	St John the Baptist, Sampford Peverell; St Mary, Burlescombe; St Andrew, Halberton; SS Simon & Jude, Hockworthy; Holcombe Rogus, All Saints; St Peter, Uplowman		Team Rector: Glyn Lewry	5,001	
Silverton (St Mary), Butterleigh, Bickleigh and Cadeleigh – Silverton Mission Community	St Mary, Silverton; St Mary, Bickleigh; St Matthew, Butterleigh; St Bartholomew, Cadeleigh		Rector: Alan MacDonald; NSM: Catherine Jenkins; NSM: Thomas Thompson	2,577	
Tiverton (St Peter) and Chevithorne with Cove^{1}	St Peter, Tiverton; St Thomas, Chevithorne		Rector/Priest-in-Charge: Robert Gordon; Curate (St Andrew): Richard Maudsley	13,359	
Tiverton (St Andrew)^{1}	St Andrew, Tiverton		Rector/Priest-in-Charge: Robert Gordon; Curate (St Andrew): Richard Maudsley	13,359	
Tiverton (St George) (St Paul)^{1}	St George, Tiverton; St Paul, Tiverton		Priest-in-Charge: Andy Humm; Curate: Justin Montague; NSM: David Lyddon	7,505	
Washfield (St Mary the Virgin), Stoodleigh, Withleigh, Calverleigh, Oakford, Templeton, Loxbeare, Rackenford, and Cruwys Morchard – Exe Valley Mission Community	St Mary the Virgin, Washfield; St Mary the Virgin, Calverleigh; Holy Cross, Cruwys Morchard; St Michael & All Angels, Loxbeare; St Peter, Oakford; All Saints, Rackenford; St Margaret, Stoodleigh; St Margaret, Templeton; St Catherine, Withleigh		Team Rector: Stephanie Jeffs; NSM: John Roberts	2,468	
Willand (St Mary the Virgin), Uffculme, Kentisbeare and Blackborough – Culm Valley Mission Community	St Mary the Virgin, Willand		Priest-in-Charge: Simon Talbot; Curate: John Dale; NSM: Michael North	3,950	
Willand (St Mary the Virgin), Uffculme, Kentisbeare and Blackborough – Culm Valley Mission Community	St Mary the Virgin, Uffculme		Priest-in-Charge: Simon Talbot; Curate: John Dale; NSM: Michael North	3,950	
Willand (St Mary the Virgin), Uffculme, Kentisbeare and Blackborough – Culm Valley Mission Community	All Saints, Blackborough (?); St Mary, Kentisbeare; St Stephen, Ashill		Priest-in-Charge: Simon Talbot; Curate: John Dale; NSM: Michael North	3,950	

^{1}part of the Tiverton Mission Community

=== Deanery of Moreton ===
Benefice	Churches	Link	Clergy	Population served	Ref
Ashburton (St Andrew), Bickington, Buckland in the Moor, Holne, Huccaby, Leusdon, Princetown, Postbridge, and Widecombe-In-The-Moor – Ashburton & Moorland Mission Community	St Andrew, Ashburton; St Mary the Virgin, Bickington; St Peter, Buckland in the Moor; St Mary the Virgin, Holne; St Raphael, Huccaby; St John the Baptist, Leusdon; St Gabriel, Postbridge; St Pancras, Widecombe-in-the-Moor		Priest-in-Charge: Mark Rylands; Team Vicar: Geoffrey Fenton	5,671	
Bovey Tracey (St John the Evangelist) with Heathfield^{1}	St John the Evangelist, Bovey Tracey; St Catherine, Heathfield		Vicar: Vacant	3,939	
Bovey Tracey (St Peter and St Paul and St Thomas of Canterbury) with Hennock^{1}	SS Peter, Paul & Thomas of Canterbury, Bovey Tracey; St Mary, Hennock		Vicar: Graham Hamilton	3,692	
Ilsington (St Michael)^{1}	St Michael, Ilsington		Vicar: David Harris	2,371	
Moretonhampstead (St Andrew), Manaton, North Bovey and Lustleigh^{1}	St Andrew, Moretonhampstead; St John the Baptist, Lustleigh; St Winifred, Manaton; Doccombe Chapel; St John the Baptist, North Bovey		Rector: Simon Franklin	2,818	
Chudleigh (St Mary and St Martin) with Chudleigh Knighton and Trusham – Chudleigh Mission Community	SS Mary & Martin, Chudleigh		Vicar: Paul Wimsett; NSM: Martin Fletcher	5,872	
Chudleigh (St Mary and St Martin) with Chudleigh Knighton and Trusham – Chudleigh Mission Community	St Michael & All Angels, Trusham		Vicar: Paul Wimsett; NSM: Martin Fletcher	5,872	
Chudleigh (St Mary and St Martin) with Chudleigh Knighton and Trusham – Chudleigh Mission Community	St Paul, Chudleigh Knighton		Vicar: Paul Wimsett; NSM: Martin Fletcher	5,872	

^{1}part of the Bovey Valley Mission Community

=== Deanery of Newton Abbot and Ipplepen ===
Benefice	Churches	Link	Clergy	Population served	Ref
Kingskerswell (St Mary) with Coffinswell^{1}	St Mary, Kingskerswell; St Bartholomew, Coffinswell		Vicar/Priest-in-Charge: Vacant	6,724	
Abbotskerswell (Blessed Virgin Mary)^{1}	Blessed Virgin Mary, Abbotskerswell		Vicar/Priest-in-Charge: Vacant	6,724	
Ipplepen (St Andrew) with Torbryan, Denbury, Broadhempston and Woodland – Beacon Parishes Mission Community	St Andrew, Ipplepen; SS Peter & Paul, Broadhempston; St Mary the Virgin, Denbury; St John the Baptist, Woodland		Rector: Andrew Down	4,158	
Kingsteignton (St Michael) and Teigngrace – Kingsteignton Mission Community	St Michael, Kingsteignton; SS Peter & Paul, Teigngrace		Vicar: Mark Smith; NSM: Sandra Gill	10,722	
Newton Abbot (All Saints) (St Mary) (St Paul) – Newton Abbot Mission Community	All Saints, Highweek; St Paul, Newton Abbot; St Mary, Wolborough; St Luke, Milber; St Bartholomew, Ogwell		Team Rector: Patrick Parkes; Team Vicar: Nicholas Debney; Team Vicar: Gareth Regan	27,143	
Shaldon (St Nicholas) (St Peter), Stokeinteignhead, Combeinteignhead and Haccombe – Shaldon Mission Community	St Nicholas, Shaldon; St Peter, Shaldon; All Saints, Combeinteignhead; St Blaise, Haccombe; St Andrew, Stokeinteignhead		Rector: Annie Church	3,552	

^{1}part of the Abbotskerswell Mission Community

=== Deanery of Okehampton ===
Benefice	Churches	Link	Clergy	Population served	Ref
Chagford (St Michael), Gidleigh, Throwleigh, Drewsteignton, South Tawton, Spreyton, Hittisleigh, North Tawton, Bondleigh, Honeychurch and Sampford Courtenay – Whiddon Mission Community	St Michael the Archangel, Chagford		Team Rector: Paul Seaton-Burn; Team Vicar: Nicholas Weldon; NSM: Harriet Every; NSM: Rita Bullworthy	6,939	
Chagford (St Michael), Gidleigh, Throwleigh, Drewsteignton, South Tawton, Spreyton, Hittisleigh, North Tawton, Bondleigh, Honeychurch and Sampford Courtenay – Whiddon Mission Community	St Peter, North Tawton		Team Rector: Paul Seaton-Burn; Team Vicar: Nicholas Weldon; NSM: Harriet Every; NSM: Rita Bullworthy	6,939	
Chagford (St Michael), Gidleigh, Throwleigh, Drewsteignton, South Tawton, Spreyton, Hittisleigh, North Tawton, Bondleigh, Honeychurch and Sampford Courtenay – Whiddon Mission Community	St James the Apostle, Bondleigh; Holy Trinity, Drewsteignton; Holy Trinity, Gidleigh; St Andrew, Hittisleigh; St Mary, Honeychurch; St Andrew, Sampford Courtenay; St Andrew, South Tawton; St Mary's Chapel, South Zeal; St Michael, Spreyton; St Mary the Virgin, Throwleigh		Team Rector: Paul Seaton-Burn; Team Vicar: Nicholas Weldon; NSM: Harriet Every; NSM: Rita Bullworthy	6,939	
Okehampton (All Saints) (St James), Inwardleigh, Belstone, Sourton, Bridestowe, Bratton Clovelly, Germansweek, Lydford, Hatherleigh, Northlew with Ashbury, Exbourne, Meeth and Jacobstowe – Northmoor Mission Community	All Saints, Okehampton; St James, Okehampton; St Mary, Belstone; St Mary the Virgin, Bratton Clovelly; St Bridget, Bridestowe; St Mary the Virgin, Exbourne; St German, Germansweek; St John the Baptist, Hatherleigh; St Petroc, Inwardleigh; St James, Jacobstowe (?); St Petrock, Lydford; St Michael & All Angels, Meeth; St Thomas of Canterbury, Northlew; St Thomas of Canterbury, Sourton; St Mary, Sticklepath		Team Rector: Stephen Cook; Team Vicar: Adrian Brook; Curate: Rich Foley	14,169	

=== Deanery of Torbay ===
Benefice	Churches	Link	Clergy	Population served	Ref
Brixham (St Mary) (All Saints) with Churston Ferrers and Kingswear – Brixham Mission Community	St Mary, Brixham; All Saints, Brixham		Team Rector: Ian Blyde; Team Vicar: John Gay; Curate: Pamela Wheeler	20,486	
Brixham (St Mary) (All Saints) with Churston Ferrers and Kingswear – Brixham Mission Community	St Mary the Virgin, Churston Ferrers; Good Shepherd, Galmpton; St Thomas of Canterbury, Kingswear		Team Rector: Ian Blyde; Team Vicar: John Gay; Curate: Pamela Wheeler	20,486	
Cockington (St George and St Mary) (St Matthew)^{2}	SS George & Mary, Cockington (MED); St Matthew, Chelston (1884)		Priest-in-Charge: Dave George; NSM: Paul Evans	8,847	
Shiphay Collaton (St John the Baptist)^{2}	St John the Baptist, Shiphay (1897)		Priest-in-Charge: Paul Ireton	6,518	
Goodrington (St George) and Collaton St Mary – Goodrington & Collaton St Mary Mission Community	St Mary, Collaton St Mary; St George, Goodrington		Vicar: Gary Deighton	12,240	
Paignton (Christ Church) and Preston St Paul – Preston & Christchurch Mission Community	St Paul, Preston; Christ Church, Paignton		Vicar: John Pout	13,773	
Paignton (St John the Baptist) (St Andrew) (St Boniface) – Paignton St John Mission Community	St John the Baptist, Paignton; St Andrew the Apostle, Paignton; St Boniface, Foxhole		Vicar: Roger Carlton; Curate: Harry Jevons	20,388	
St Marychurch (St Mary the Virgin)^{1}	St Mary the Virgin, St Marychurch (MED)		Priest-in-Charge: Robert Ward	8,811	
Torquay (St John)^{1}	St John the Apostle, Torquay (1822)		Hon. Curate: John Lee	1,977	
Babbacombe (All Saints)^{1}	All Saints, Babbacombe (1865)		Vicar: Paul Jones	6,399	
Torquay (St Martin) Barton^{1}	St Martin, Barton (1928)		Vicar: Gorran Chapman	10,125	
Torquay (St Matthias) (St Mark) (Holy Trinity) – Wellswood Mission Community	St Matthias, Wellswood (1857)		Rector: John Beckett; Curate: Stephen Yates; NSM: Paul Barton	8,702	
Torre (All Saints)^{3}	All Saints, Torre (1867)		Priest-in-Charge: Peter March	6,655	
Torquay (St Luke)^{3}	St Luke, Torquay (1861)		Priest-in-Charge: Peter March	6,655	
Upton (St Mary Magdalene) – Town Centre Mission Community	St Mary Magdalene, Upton (1848)		Rector: Samuel Leach; Priest-in-Charge: Simon May; Curate: Robert Densmore; NSM: John Garner; NSM: Innocent Kiyaga	6,618	

^{1}part of the Our Lady & All the Saints Mission Community ^{2}part of the West Torquay Mission Community ^{3}part of the All Saints & St Luke Mission Community

=== Deanery of Totnes ===
Benefice	Churches	Link	Clergy	Population served	Ref
Brent, South (St Petroc) and Rattery	St Petroc, South Brent; Blessed Virgin Mary, Rattery		Vicar: Vacant	3,303	
Dartmouth (St Petrox) (St Saviour) and Dittisham – Dartmouth Dittisham Mission Community	St Petrox, Dartmouth; St Saviour, Dartmouth; St Clement, Townstal		Vicar: Will Hazlewood; Assoc. Priest: Robert Boyle; Curate: Andrew Langley	6,045	
Dartmouth (St Petrox) (St Saviour) and Dittisham – Dartmouth Dittisham Mission Community	St George, Dittisham		Vicar: Will Hazlewood; Assoc. Priest: Robert Boyle; Curate: Andrew Langley	6,045	
Diptford (St Mary the Virgin), North Huish, Harberton, Harbertonford, Halwell and Moreleigh^{1}	St Mary the Virgin, Diptford; St James' Chapel, Avonwick; St Leonard, Halwell; St Andrew, Harberton; St Peter, Harbertonford; All Saints, Moreleigh		Priest-in-Charge: David Sayle	5,297	
Ermington (St Peter and St Paul) and Ugborough^{1}	SS Peter & Paul, Ermington; St Peter, Ugborough		Priest-in-Charge: David Sayle	5,297	
Staverton (St Paul De Leon) with Landscove, Littlehempston, Buckfastleigh and Dean Prior – Dart Valley Mission Community	St Luke, Buckfastleigh; St Paul de Leon, Staverton; St George the Martyr, Dean Prior; St John the Baptist, Littlehempston; St Matthew, Landscove		Rector: Tom Benson; Curate: Fiona Wimsett	5,185	
Totnes (St Mary) with Bridgetown, Berry Pomeroy, Dartington, Maarldon, Ashprington, Cornworthy and Stoke Gabriel – Totnes Mission Community	St Mary, Totnes; St John, Bridgetown		Team Rector: Julian Ould; Team Vicar: Deborah Parsons; Curate: Gill Still; Curate: Jane Frost; Curate: Steven Jones; NSM: Angela Sumner	14,407	
Totnes (St Mary) with Bridgetown, Berry Pomeroy, Dartington, Maarldon, Ashprington, Cornworthy and Stoke Gabriel – Totnes Mission Community	St John the Baptist, Marldon		Team Rector: Julian Ould; Team Vicar: Deborah Parsons; Curate: Gill Still; Curate: Jane Frost; Curate: Steven Jones; NSM: Angela Sumner	14,407	
Totnes (St Mary) with Bridgetown, Berry Pomeroy, Dartington, Maarldon, Ashprington, Cornworthy and Stoke Gabriel – Totnes Mission Community	SS Mary & Gabriel, Stoke Gabriel		Team Rector: Julian Ould; Team Vicar: Deborah Parsons; Curate: Gill Still; Curate: Jane Frost; Curate: Steven Jones; NSM: Angela Sumner	14,407	
Totnes (St Mary) with Bridgetown, Berry Pomeroy, Dartington, Maarldon, Ashprington, Cornworthy and Stoke Gabriel – Totnes Mission Community	St David, Ashprington; St Mary, Berry Pomeroy; St Peter, Cornworthy; St Mary, Dartington; St Barnabas, Brooking		Team Rector: Julian Ould; Team Vicar: Deborah Parsons; Curate: Gill Still; Curate: Jane Frost; Curate: Steven Jones; NSM: Angela Sumner	14,407	

^{1}part of the Three Rivers Mission Community

=== Deanery of Woodleigh ===
Benefice	Churches	Link	Clergy	Population served	Ref
Kingsbridge (St Edmund the King and Martyr), Dodbrooke, and West Alvington – Kingsbridge Mission Community	St Edmund King & Martyr, Kingsbridge; St Thomas a Becket, Dodbrooke; All Saints, West Alvington		Rector: Jacqueline Taylor; Curate: David Bond	6,313	
Modbury (St George), Bigbury, Ringmore, Kingston, and Aveton Gifford – Modbury Mission Community	St George, Modbury; St Andrew, Aveton Gifford; St Lawrence, Bigbury; St James, Kingston; All Hallows, Ringmore		Rector: Matthew Rowland	3,566	
Salcombe (Holy Trinity) and Malborough with South Huish – Salcombe and Marlborough Mission Community	Holy Trinity, Salcombe		Vicar: Daniel French; Curate: Ruth Frampton; NSM: Stephen Ball	3,350	
Salcombe (Holy Trinity) and Malborough with South Huish – Salcombe and Marlborough Mission Community	All Saints, Malborough; St Clement, Hope Cove; Holy Trinity, South Huish		Vicar: Daniel French; Curate: Ruth Frampton; NSM: Stephen Ball	3,350	
Stoke Fleming (St Peter), Blackawton, Strete and East Allington – Coast & Country Mission Community	St Peter, Stoke Fleming; St Michael, Blackawton; St Andrew, East Allington; St Michael, Strete		Vicar: Alison Shaw	2,883	
Stokenham (St Michael and All Angels), Slapton, Charleton with Buckland-Tout-Saints, East Portlemouth, South Pool, and Chivelstone – Start Bay Mission Community	St Peter, Buckland Tout Saints; St Mary, Charleton; St Sylvester, Chivelstone; St Winwaloe Onocaus, East Portlemouth; St James the Great, Slapton; SS Nicholas & Cyriac, South Pool		Priest-in-Charge: Pam Kemp; NSM: Michael Berrett	4,033	
Stokenham (St Michael and All Angels), Slapton, Charleton with Buckland-Tout-Saints, East Portlemouth, South Pool, and Chivelstone – Start Bay Mission Community	St Andrew, Beesands; St Martin, Sherford; St Michael & All Angels, Stokenham		Priest-in-Charge: Pam Kemp; NSM: Michael Berrett	4,033	
Thurlestone (All Saints), South Milton, Churchstow, Woodleigh and Loddiswell – Aune Valley Mission Community	All Saints, Thurlestone; St Mary, Churchstow; St Michael & All Angels, Loddiswell; All Saints, South Milton; St Mary the Virgin, Woodleigh		Rector: Daniel Hartley	2,971	

=== Deanery of Barnstaple ===
Benefice	Churches	Link	Clergy	Population served	Ref
Braunton (St Brannock) – Braunton Mission Community	St Brannock, Braunton; St Anne, Saunton		Priest-in-Charge: Anne Thorne; Hon. Curate: Leslie Buttle	8,086	
Fremington (St Peter), Instow and Westleigh – Fremington Mission Community	St Peter, Fremington		Vicar: Steve Goodbody; Curate: Keith Brimacombe; Curate: Tom Simpson	7,327	
Fremington (St Peter), Instow and Westleigh – Fremington Mission Community	St John the Baptist, Instow; All Saints, Instow; St Peter, Westleigh		Vicar: Steve Goodbody; Curate: Keith Brimacombe; Curate: Tom Simpson	7,327	
Georgeham (St George) – Georgeham Mission Community	St George, Georgeham; St Mary Magdalene, Croyde		Priest-in-Charge: Tim Solosy	1,434	
Heanton Punchardon (St Augustine), Marwood and West Down – Villages North Devon Mission Community	St Augustine, Heanton Punchardon; St Michael & All Angels, Marwood; St Calixtus, West Down		Priest-in-Charge: Steve Painting; Curate: Caroline Raby	3,817	
Ilfracombe (Holy Trinity) (St Peter), Lee, Woolacombe, Bittadon and Mortehoe^{1}	Holy Trinity, Ilfracombe; St Peter, Ilfracombe		Priest-in-Charge: John Roles; Team Vicar: Giles King-Smith; Curate: Murray Aldridge-Collins; NSM: Linda Walters	11,133	
Ilfracombe (Holy Trinity) (St Peter), Lee, Woolacombe, Bittadon and Mortehoe^{1}	St Matthew, Lee; St Mary Magdalene, Mortehoe; St Sabinus, Woolacombe		Priest-in-Charge: John Roles; Team Vicar: Giles King-Smith; Curate: Murray Aldridge-Collins; NSM: Linda Walters	11,133	
Ilfracombe (Holy Trinity) (St Peter), Lee, Woolacombe, Bittadon and Mortehoe^{1}	St Peter, Bittadon		Priest-in-Charge: John Roles; Team Vicar: Giles King-Smith; Curate: Murray Aldridge-Collins; NSM: Linda Walters	11,133	
Ilfracombe (St Philip and St James)^{1}	SS Philip & James, Ilfracombe		Rector: Vacant	2,132	
Newport (St John the Baptist) and Bishops Tawton^{2}	St John the Baptist, Newport; St John the Baptist, Bishop's Tawton; Herner Chapel		Vicar: Andy Dodwell; NSM: Catherine Scoffield	6,238	
Pilton (St Mary the Virgin) with Ashford^{2}	St Mary the Virgin, Pilton; St Peter, Ashford		Vicar: Nigel Dilkes; NSM: Marion Sanders	5,678	
Sticklepath (St Paul) with Roundswell^{2}	St Paul, Barnstaple		Vicar: Guy Chave-Cox	6,734	
Barnstaple (Holy Trinity) and Goodleigh^{2}	Holy Trinity, Barnstaple		Vicar: Benjamin Lillie; NSM: Shirley Paterson	7,076	
Barnstaple (Holy Trinity) and Goodleigh^{2}	St Gregory, Goodleigh		Vicar: Benjamin Lillie; NSM: Shirley Paterson	7,076	
Barnstaple (St Peter and St Mary Magdalene)^{2}	SS Peter & Mary Magdalene, Barnstaple		Vicar: David Fletcher	6,149	

^{1}part of the Coast and Combe Mission Community (which also includes the parishes of Berrynarbor and Combe Martin from Shirwell deanery) ^{2}part of the Barnstaple Mission Community

=== Deanery of Hartland ===
Benefice	Churches	Link	Clergy	Population served	Ref
Abbotsham (St Helen)	St Helen, Abbotsham		Hon. Priest-in-Charge: Vacant	1,386	
Appledore (St Mary), Northam, and Westward Ho! – Appledore, Northam, and Westward Ho Mission Community	St Mary, Appledore; St Margaret, Northam; Holy Trinity, Westward Ho!		Vicar: Derek Arnold; NSM: Sandra Juniper	11,297	
Bideford (St Mary), Landcross, Littleham, Monkleigh, and Weare Gifford – Bideford & the Four Villages Mission Community	St Mary, Bideford		Team Rector: Claire Rose-Casemore; Team Vicar: Marisa Cockfield; Curate: Leigh Winsbury; NSM: Alan Glover	17,630	
Bideford (St Mary), Landcross, Littleham, Monkleigh, and Weare Gifford – Bideford & the Four Villages Mission Community	Holy Trinity, Landcross; St Swithin, Littleham; St George, Monkleigh; Holy Trinity, Weare Giffard		Team Rector: Claire Rose-Casemore; Team Vicar: Marisa Cockfield; Curate: Leigh Winsbury; NSM: Alan Glover	17,630	
Parkham (St James), Alwington, Buckland Brewer, Hartland, Welcombe, Clovelly, Woolfardisworthy West, Bucks Mills and Lundy – Hartland Coast Mission Community	St Andrew, Alwington; SS Mary & Benedict, Buckland Brewer; St Anne, Bucks Mills; All Saints, Clovelly; St Peter, Clovelly; St Nectan, Hartland; St Helen, Lundy; St James, Parkham; St Nectan, Welcombe; All Hallows, Woolfardisworthy		Team Rector: Vacant; Team Vicar: Madeline Bray; NSM: Kevin Beer; NSM: Jane Hayes	5,569	

=== Deanery of Holsworthy ===
Benefice	Churches	Link	Clergy	Population served	Ref
Ashwater (St Peter Ad Vincula), Halwill, Beaworthy, Clawton and Tetcott with Luffincott^{1}	St Peter ad Vincula, Ashwater		Rector: Jane Lucas	2,466	
Ashwater (St Peter Ad Vincula), Halwill, Beaworthy, Clawton and Tetcott with Luffincott^{1}	St Alban, Beaworthy; St Leonard, Clawton; SS Peter & James, Halwill; Holy Cross, Tetcott		Rector: Jane Lucas	2,466	
Black Torrington (St Mary), Bradford with Cookbury, Thornbury and Highampton^{1}	St Mary, Black Torrington; All Saints, Bradford; St John the Baptist & the Seven Maccabees, Cookbury; Holy Cross, Highampton; St Peter, Thornbury		Rector: Kathy Roberts	1,629	
Bradworthy (St John the Baptist), Sutcombe, Putford, Abbots Bickington, Bulkworthy, and Milton Damerel^{1}	St John the Baptist, Bradworthy; St James, Abbots Bickington; St Michael, Bulkworthy; Holy Trinity, Milton Damerel; St Stephen, Putford; St Andrew, Sutcombe		Rector: Rick Freeman	2,310	
Holsworthy (St Peter and St Paul), Hollacombe, Pyworthy, Pancrasweek and Bridgerule^{1}	SS Peter & Paul, Holsworthy; St Bridget, Bridgerule; St Petroc, Hollacombe; St Pancras, Pancrasweek; St Swithun, Pyworthy		Priest-in-Charge: Elizabeth Burke	5,271	

^{1}part of the Holsworthy Mission Community

=== Deanery of Shirwell ===
Benefice	Churches	Link	Clergy	Population served	Ref
Lynton, Brendon, Countisbury, Parracombe, Martinhoe and Trentishoe			Rector: Miles Welborn	5,606	
Lynton, Brendon, Countisbury, Parracombe, Martinhoe and Trentishoe	St Brendon, Brendon^{2}; St John the Evangelist, Countisbury^{2}; St John the Baptist, Lynmouth^{2}; St Mary the Virgin, Lynton^{2}; St Bartholomew, Barbrook^{2}; St Martin, Martinhoe^{2}; Christ Church, Parracombe^{2}; St Peter, Trentishoe^{2}		Rector: Miles Welborn	5,606	
Shirwell (St Peter), Loxhore, Kentisbury, Arlington, East Down, Bratton Fleming, Challacombe and Stoke Rivers – Shirwell Mission Community	St Peter, Shirwell; St Peter, Bratton Fleming; Holy Trinity, Challacombe; St James, Arlington; St John the Baptist, East Down; St Thomas, Kentisbury; St Michael & All Angels, Loxhore; St Bartholomew, Stoke Rivers		Team Rector: Rosie Austin; Team Vicar: Katie Welborn	2,549	
Swimbridge (St James the Apostle), West Buckland, Landkey, and East Buckland – Four Ways Mission Community	St James the Apostle, Swimbridge; St Michael, East Buckland; Holy Name Chapel, Gunn; St Peter, West Buckland		Priest-in-Charge: Shaun O'Rourke; NSM: Geoffrey Squire	3,322	
Swimbridge (St James the Apostle), West Buckland, Landkey, and East Buckland – Four Ways Mission Community	St Paul, Landkey		Priest-in-Charge: Shaun O'Rourke; NSM: Geoffrey Squire	3,322	

^{1}part of the Coast and 'Combe Mission Community (which also includes seven churches from Barnstaple deanery) ^{2}part of the Lyn Valley Mission Community

=== Deanery of South Molton ===
Benefice	Churches	Link	Clergy	Population served	Ref
Bishopsnympton (St Mary the Virgin), Charles, East Anstey, High Bray, Knowstone, Mariansleigh, Molland, North Molton with Twitchen, Rose Ash, and West Anstey – Edgemoor Mission Community	St Mary the Virgin, Bishop's Nympton; St John the Baptist, Charles; St Michael, East Anstey; All Saints, High Bray; St Peter, Knowstone; St Mary, Mariansleigh; St Mary, Molland; All Saints, North Molton; St Peter, Twitchen; St Peter, Rose Ash; St Petrock, West Anstey		Team Rector: David Baker; Team Vicar: Alastair Forman; NSM: Penny Lawson	3,782	
Burrington (Holy Trinity), Chawleigh, Cheldon, Chulmleigh, Meshaw, Romansleigh, Thelbridge, Wembworthy with Eggesford, Witheridge with Creacombe, East Worlington and West Worlington – Little Dart Mission Community	Holy Trinity, Burrington; St James, Chawleigh; St Mary, Cheldon; St Mary Magdalene, Chulmleigh; St Mary, East Worlington; St John, Weshaw; St Rumon, Romansleigh; St David, Thelbridge; All Saints, Eggesford; St Michael, Wembworthy; St Mary, West Worlington; St John the Baptist, Witheridge		Team Rector: Tony Rockey; Team Vicar: Adrian Wells; Curate: Janet May; NSM: Clive Jobbins	5,060	
Molton, South (St Mary Magdalene) with Nymet St George, Chittlehamholt, Chittlehampton with Umberleigh, Filleigh, Kingsnympton, and Warkleigh with Satterleigh – South Molton Mission Community	St Mary Magdalene, South Molton; St John the Baptist, Chittlehamholt; St Hieritha, Chittlehampton; Good Shepherd, Umberleigh; St Paul, Filleigh; St James the Apostle, King's Nympton; St George, Nymet St George; St John the Evangelist, Warkleigh		Team Rector: Michael Grandey; Team Vicar: Dave Coleman; Curate: Bryant Sanders; NSM: Lynn Flatt; NSM: Christopher Pouncey	6,925	

=== Deanery of Torrington ===
Benefice	Churches	Link	Clergy	Population served	Ref
Ashreigney (St James)^{1}	St James, Ashreigney		Priest-in-Charge: Helen Blaine	2,375	
Broadwoodkelly (All Saints)^{1}	All Hallows, Broadwoodkelly		Priest-in-Charge: Helen Blaine	2,375	
Brushford (St Mary the Virgin)^{1}	St Mary the Virgin, Brushford		Priest-in-Charge: Helen Blaine	2,375	
Winkleigh (All Saints)^{1}	All Saints, Winkleigh		Priest-in-Charge: Helen Blaine	2,375	
Dolton (St Edmund King and Martyr), Dowland, Iddesleigh, and Monkokehampton – Torridge 6 Ecumenical Mission Community	St Edmund King & Martyr, Dolton; St Peter, Dowland; St James, Iddesleigh; All Saints, Monkokehampton		Rector: Susan Oldham	1,304	
Newton Tracey (St Thomas À Becket), Horwood, Alverdiscott, Huntshaw, Yarnscombe, Tawstock, Atherington, High Bickington, Roborough, St Giles in the Wood and Beaford – Two Rivers Mission Community	St Thomas a Becket, Newton Tracey; All Saints, Alverdiscott; St Mary, Atherington; All Saints, Beaford; St Mary, High Bickington; St Michael, Horwood; St Mary Magdalene, Huntshaw; St Peter, Roborough; St Giles, St Giles in the Wood; St Peter, Tawstock; St Andrew, Yarnscombe		Team Rector:Gary Owen; Team Vicar: vacant; Curate: Tracey Doyle	4,345	
Shebbear (St Michael), Buckland Filleigh, Sheepwash, Langtree, Newton St Petrock, Petrockstowe, Petersmarland, Merton and Huish – Torridge Mission Community	St Michael, Shebbear; St Mary & Holy Trinity, Buckland Filleigh; St James the Less, Huish; All Saints, Langtree; All Saints, Merton; St Petrock, Newton St Petrock; St Peter, Petersmarland; St Petroc, Petrockstowe; St Lawrence, Sheepwash		Team Rector: Martin Warren	3,407	
Torrington, Great (St Michael), Little Torrington and Frithelstock – Torrington Mission Community	St Michael & All Angels, Great Torrington; St Giles, Little Torrington; St Mary Magdalene, Taddiport; SS Mary & Gregory, Frithelstock		Vicar:vacant	6,429	

^{1}part of the Winkleigh Mission Community

=== Deanery of Ivybridge ===
Benefice	Churches	Link	Clergy	Population served	Ref
Sparkwell (All Saints)^{1}	All Saints, Sparkwell		Vicar/Priest-in-Charge: Vacant	2,223	
Cornwood (St Michael and All Angels)^{1}	St Michael & All Angels, Cornwood		Vicar/Priest-in-Charge: Vacant	2,223	
Ivybridge (St John the Evangelist) with Harford^{1}	St John the Evangelist, Ivybridge; St Petroc, Harford		Vicar: Chris Osborne	12,073	
Holbeton (All Saints)^{2}	All Saints, Holbeton		Priest-in-Charge: Anne Legge; Curate (N. Ferrers): Joe Lannon	2,474	
Newton Ferrers (Holy Cross) with Revelstoke^{2}	Holy Cross, Newton Ferrers; St Peter the Poor Fisherman, Revelstoke		Priest-in-Charge: Anne Legge; Curate (N. Ferrers): Joe Lannon	2,474	
Wembury (St Werburgh)^{3}	St Werburgh, Wembury		Priest-in-Charge: Martin Kirkbride	2,723	
Yealmpton (St Bartholomew) and Brixton^{3}	St Bartholomew, Yealmpton; St Mary, Brixton		Priest-in-Charge: Owen Murphy	3,286	

^{1}part of the South Dartmoor Mission Community ^{2}part of the Yealm & Erme Mission Community ^{3}part of the Yealmside Mission Community

=== Deanery of Plymouth City ===
Benefice	Churches	Link	Clergy	Population served	Ref
Bickleigh Roborough (St Mary the Virgin) and Shaugh Prior^{1}	St Mary the Virgin, Bickleigh; St Anne, Glenholt; St Edward King & Martyr, Shaugh Prior; St Cecilia, Woolwell		Priest-in-Charge: Simon Rundell; Curate: Chris Routledge (see below); NSM: Michael Fairall	7,402	
Plymouth Crownhill (Ascension)^{1}	Ascension, Crownhill		Priest-in-Charge: Tim Thorp; Curate: Simon Rundell (see above); Curate: Chris Routledge (see below); Curate: Richard Wakerell	6,652	
Charles with Plymouth St Matthias – Plymouth Charles Mission Community	St Matthias, Plymouth		Priest-in-Charge: Olly Ryder; Curate: Rob Fowler; Curate: Reuben Crossley	10,803	
Devonport (St Bartholomew) and Ford St Mark – St Bartholomew & St Mark Ford Mission Community	St Bartholomew, Devonport; St Mark, Ford		Vicar/Priest-in-Charge: Richard Silk; NSM (St Gabriel): Andrew Overton	18,576	
Plymouth (St Gabriel) Peverell^{2}	St Gabriel, Peverell Park		Vicar/Priest-in-Charge: Richard Silk; NSM (St Gabriel): Andrew Overton	18,576	
Sutton-On-Plym (St John the Evangelist), Plymouth St Simon and St Mary Laira^{2}	St Mary the Virgin, Laira; St John the Evangelist, Plymouth; St Simon the Apostle, Plymouth		Priest-in-Charge: Vacant; NSM: Andrew Overton (see above)	12,950	
Devonport (St Boniface)	St Boniface, Devonport		Vicar: Mike Doyle	12,358	
Weston Mill (St Philip)	St Philip, Weston Mill		Vicar: Mike Doyle	12,358	
Devonport (St Budeaux)	St Budeaux, St Budeaux		Vicar: Stephen Beach; Curate: Adam Price	5,110	
Devonport (St Michael) (St Barnabas) – St Michael & St Barnabas Mission Community	SS Michael & Barnabas, Devonport		Vicar: Tim Buckley	9,254	
Eggbuckland (St Edward) with Estover – Forder Valley Mission Community	St Edward, Eggbuckland		Vicar: Chris Routledge; Curate: Carl Budden; Curate: Simon Rundell (see above); Curate: Keith Murphy	20,297	
Eggbuckland (St Edward) with Estover – Forder Valley Mission Community	Christ Church, Estover		Vicar: Chris Routledge; Curate: Carl Budden; Curate: Simon Rundell (see above); Curate: Keith Murphy	20,297	
Elburton (St Matthew) – Elburton Mission Community	St Matthew, Elburton		Vicar: James Croucher; Curate (SCC minister): Tom Brassil	4,525	
Elburton (St Matthew) – Elburton Mission Community	Sherford Community Church		Vicar: James Croucher; Curate (SCC minister): Tom Brassil	4,525	
Ernesettle (St Aidan), Whitleigh and Honicknowle – Our Lady of Glastonbury Mission Community	St Aidan, Ernesettle; St Francis of Assisi, Honicknowle; St Chad, Whitleigh		Vicar: David Bailey; NSM: David Watson	18,567	
Pennycross (St Pancras) – St Pancras Mission Community	St Pancras, Pennycross		Vicar: Lawrence Braschi	9,941	
Plymouth (Emmanuel), St Paul Efford and St Augustine – Plymouth Emmanuel Mission Community	Emmanuel, Plymouth		Team Rector: Karl Freeman; Curate: Chris Taylor; Curate: Tony Williams; NSM: Darryl Cree; NSM: Beverley Cree	19,007	
Plymouth (Emmanuel), St Paul Efford and St Augustine – Plymouth Emmanuel Mission Community	St Paul, Efford		Team Rector: Karl Freeman; Curate: Chris Taylor; Curate: Tony Williams; NSM: Darryl Cree; NSM: Beverley Cree	19,007	
Plymouth (St Andrew) and St Paul Stonehouse – St Andrew St Paul Mission Community	Minster of St Andrew, Plymouth; St Paul, Stonehouse		Team Rector: Joe Dent; Team Vicar: Leon Sim; Curate: Tim Partridge	9,897	
Plymouth (St Jude) – St Jude Mission Community	St Jude, Plymouth		Priest-in-Charge: Tim Smith; Curate: Kimberley Lovell	6,358	
Plymouth (St Peter) and the Holy Apostles – St Peter & the Holy Apostles Mission Community	St Peter the Apostle, Plymouth; St James the Less, Ham Drive; St Thomas the Apostle, Keyham		Priest-in-Charge: Dave Way	15,839	
Plympton (St Mary the Blessed Virgin) (St Maurice) – Plympton Mission Community	St Mary the Blessed Virgin, Plympton		Team Rector: Rob Harris; Team Vicar: Will Sweeney; Curate: Sarah Sharland	29,965	
Plympton (St Mary the Blessed Virgin) (St Maurice) – Plympton Mission Community	St Maurice, Plympton		Team Rector: Rob Harris; Team Vicar: Will Sweeney; Curate: Sarah Sharland	29,965	
Plymstock (St Mary and All Saints) and Hooe – Plymstock Mission Community	St Mary & All Saints, Plymstock; St John the Evangelist, Hooe; Good Shepherd, Oreston; Holy Family, Staddiscombe		Team Rector: Jennie Appleby; Team Vicar: Dave Appleby	20,633	
Stoke Damerel (St Andrew with St Luke) and Devonport St Aubyn	SS Andrew & Luke, Stoke Damerel; St Aubyn, Devonport		Priest-in-Charge: Vacant	8,022	
Tamerton Foliot (St Mary) and Southway – Tamerton Foliot & Southway Mission Community	St Mary, Tamerton Foliot		Team Rector: David Gill; Team Vicar: Iain Robertson	15,226	
Tamerton Foliot (St Mary) and Southway – Tamerton Foliot & Southway Mission Community	Holy Spirit, Southway		Team Rector: David Gill; Team Vicar: Iain Robertson	15,226	

^{1}part of the Holy Family Mission Community ^{2}part of the Sacred Heart Mission Community

=== Deanery of Tavistock ===
Benefice	Churches	Link	Clergy	Population served	Ref
Bere Ferrers (St Andrew) – Bere Ferrers with Bere Alston Mission Community	St Andrew, Bere Ferrers; Holy Trinity, Bere Alston		Rector: Nick Law; Curate: Dawn Oakley	3,002	
Buckland Monachorum (St Andrew) – Buckland Monachorum Mission Community	St Andrew, Buckland Monachorum; Holy Spirit, Milton Combe		Vicar: Graham Cotter; Curate: Andrew Farmer	2,140	
Lifton (St Mary), Broadwoodwidger, Stowford, Lewtrenchard, Thrushelton and Kelly with Bradstone^{1}	St Mary, Lifton; St Nicholas, Broadwoodwidger; St Mary the Virgin, Kelly; St Peter, Lewtrenchard; St John the Baptist, Stowford; St George, Thrushelton		Vicar: Vacant	2,687	
Milton Abbot (St Constantine), Dunterton, Lamerton, Sydenham Damerel, Marystowe and Coryton^{1}	St Constantine, Milton Abbot; St Andrew, Coryton; St Peter, Lamerton; St Mary, Sydenham Damerel; St Mary the Virgin, Marystowe; All Saints, Dunterton		Vicar: Andy Atkins	2,068	
Peter Tavy (St Peter) and Mary Tavy^{2}	St Peter, Peter Tavy; St Mary, Mary Tavy		Rector: Vacant	1,134	
Tavistock (St Eustachius), Gulworthy and Brent Tor^{2}	St Eustachius, Tavistock; St Paul, Gulworthy		Vicar: Christopher Hardwick; Curate: Steven Martin; Curate: Judith Blowey; NSM: Michael Loader; NSM: Susan Tucker	10,374	
Tavistock (St Eustachius), Gulworthy and Brent Tor^{2}	St Michael de Rupe, Brent Tor; Christ Church, North Brentor		Vicar: Christopher Hardwick; Curate: Steven Martin; Curate: Judith Blowey; NSM: Michael Loader; NSM: Susan Tucker	10,374	
Whitchurch (St Andrew)^{2}	St Andrew, Whitchurch		Priest-in-Charge: Sean Brassil; NSM: Miranda Donne	3,383	
Yelverton (St Paul), Meavy, Sheepstor, Walkhampton, Sampford Spiney and Horrabridge – West Dartmoor Mission Community	St Paul, Yelverton; St John the Baptist, Horrabridge; St Peter, Meavy; St Mary, Sampford Spiney; St Leonard, Sheepstor; St Mary the Virgin, Walkhampton; St Michael & All Angels, Princetown		Rector: Nick Shutt; Curate: Gary Shirley; Curate: Diane Caine	6,731	

^{1}part of the Tamar Mission Community ^{2}part of the Tavy Mission Community

== See also ==
- List of the bishops of Exeter
