= St Paul's Church, Burnthouse Lane =

St Paul's Church, Exeter
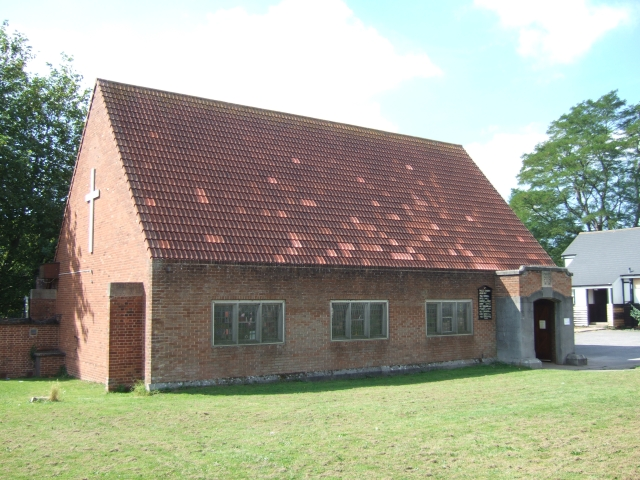
- St Paul's Church, Exeter
- St Paul's Church, Exeter
- 50°42′54″N 3°30′47″W
- OS grid reference: SX 93277 91690
- Location: Exeter
- Country: England
- Denomination: Church of England
- Website: heavitreeparish.co.uk

History
- Dedication: St Paul

Architecture
- Demolished: 2010

Administration
- Province: Canterbury
- Diocese: Exeter
- Archdeaconry: Exeter
- Deanery: Christianity
- Parish: Heavitree with St Paul

Clergy
- Rector: Fr Benjamin Rabjohns

St Paul's Church, Burnthouse Lane was a church in Exeter, Devon. The church, vicarage and hall were subject to acts of vandalism and arson. The decision was made to redevelop the site to provide social housing.

== History ==
St Paul's was established to serve the new Burnthouse Lane estate built after the Second World War. It was a parish in its own right until it was merged with Heavitree in 1977 to form a new parish.

== Clergy ==
| | Parish of Exeter St Paul |
|---|---|
| 1966–1969 | The Revd Frederick Herbert Gilbert, Curate |
| 1969–1977 | The Revd Whately Ian Eliot, Rector |
| 1977 | The Revd Robin Jeffries Tinniswood, Priest in Charge |
| | Parish of Heavitree with St Paul |
| 1966–1969 | The Revd Frederick Herbert Gilbert, Curate |
| 1969–1977 | The Revd Whately Ian Eliot, Rector |
| 1977 | The Revd Robin Jeffries Tinniswood, Priest in Charge |
| 2000-2005 | The Revd Lawrence Bate, Team Vicar |
| 2005-2016 | The Revd Paul Morrell, Team Vicar |
