= Deanery of Barnstaple =

Administrative unit of the Church of England

The Deanery of Barnstaple is part of the Archdeaconry of Barnstaple, one of the four archdeaconries in the Diocese of Exeter.

== Parishes of the Barnstaple Deanery ==
The parishes of the Barnstaple Deanery are:

- Barnstaple Holy Trinity Church, Barnstaple
- Barnstaple St Peter and St Mary Magdalene St Peter's Church, Barnstaple
- Bishops Tawton Church of St John the Baptist, Bishop's Tawton
- Braunton St Brannock's Church, Braunton
- Fremington, Devon Church of St Peter, Fremington
- Georgeham St George's Church, Georgeham
- Goodleigh
- Heanton Punchardon
- Instow
- Marwood, Devon
- Newport Church of St John the Baptist, Barnstaple
- Pilton with Ashford, North Devon Church of St Mary the Virgin, Pilton
- Sticklepath with Roundswell
- West Down
- Westleigh, North Devon
