= Deanery of Christianity =

The Deanery of Christianity may refer to two different deaneries of the Church of England:

- Deanery of Christianity (Lincoln)
- Deanery of Christianity (Exeter)
