= Holy Trinity Church, Ilfracombe =

Church in Devon, England

Holy Trinity Church
- Church of the Holy Trinity
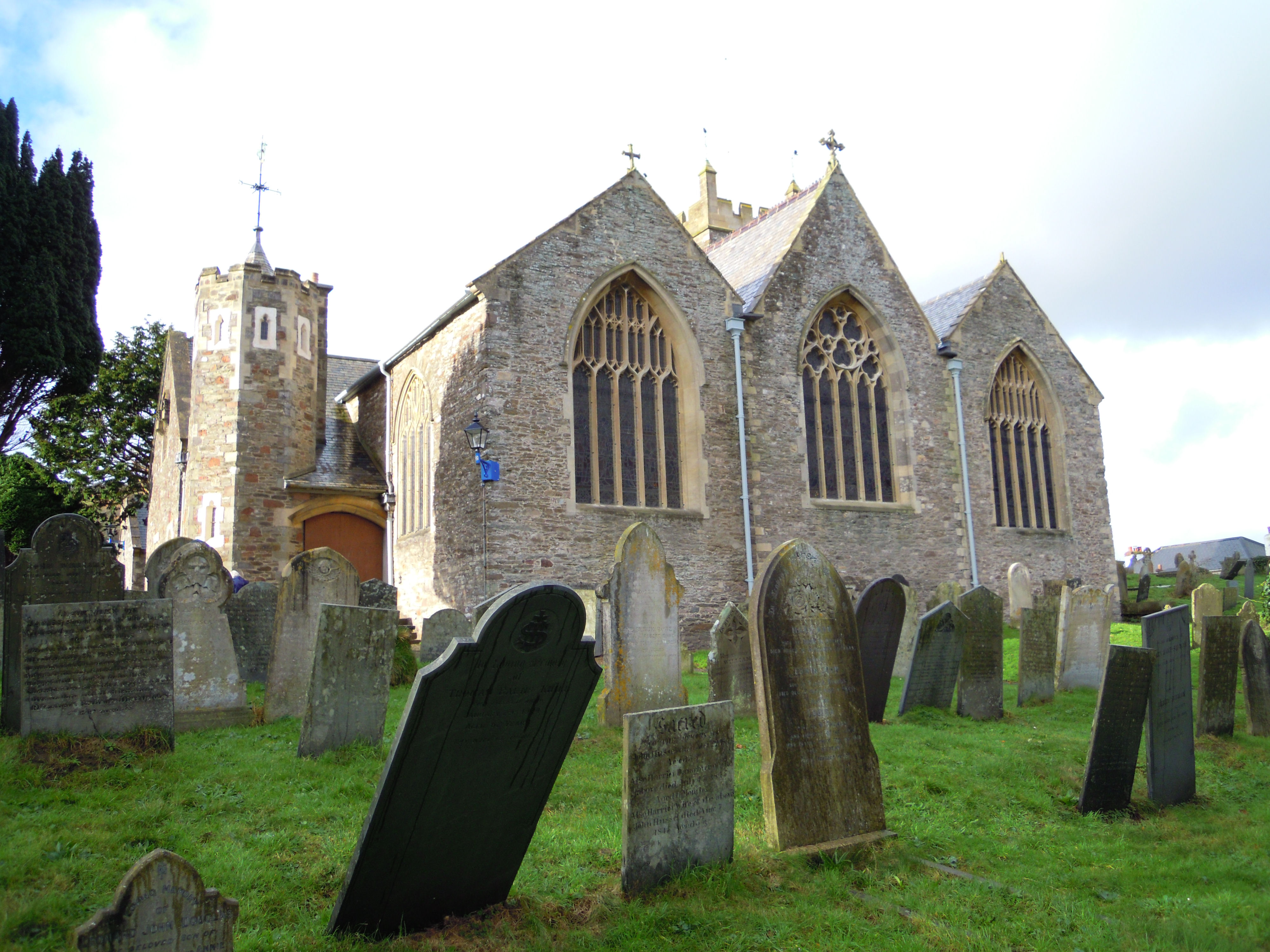
- The church in 2018
- Holy Trinity Church
- 51°12′20″N 4°07′43″W
- OS grid reference: SS 51406 47305
- Location: Ilfracombe, Devon
- Country: England
- Denomination: Anglican

Architecture
- Completed: 1263; 1322

Administration
- Province: Canterbury
- Diocese: Exeter
- Archdeaconry: Barnstaple
- Deanery: Barnstaple
- Benefice: Ilfracombe
- Parish: Ilfracombe

The Church of the Holy Trinity is the Anglican parish church for Ilfracombe in Devon. The building has been a Grade I listed building since 1951 and comes under the Diocese of Exeter.

== Architecture ==
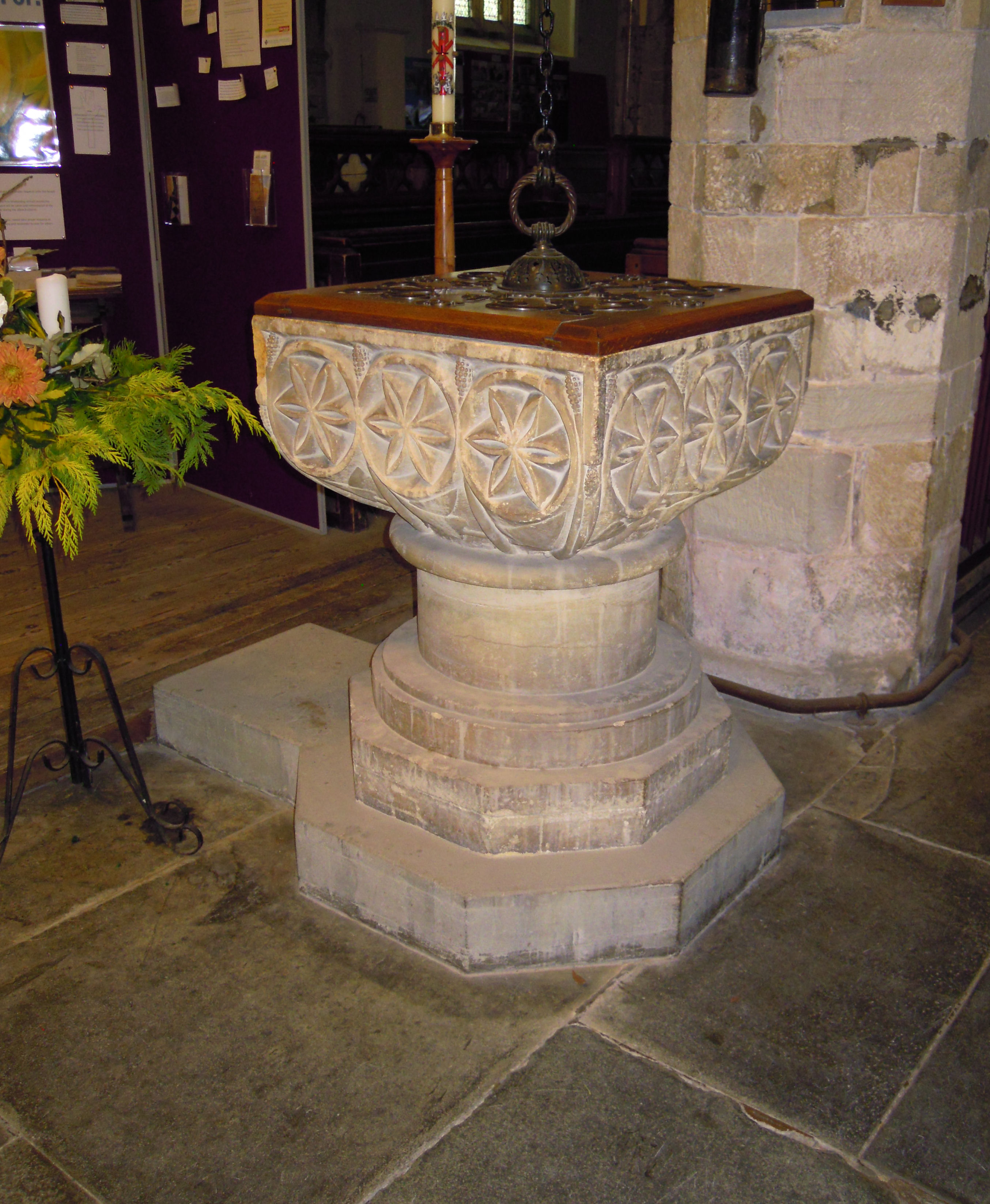
The Norman font dates to about 1160

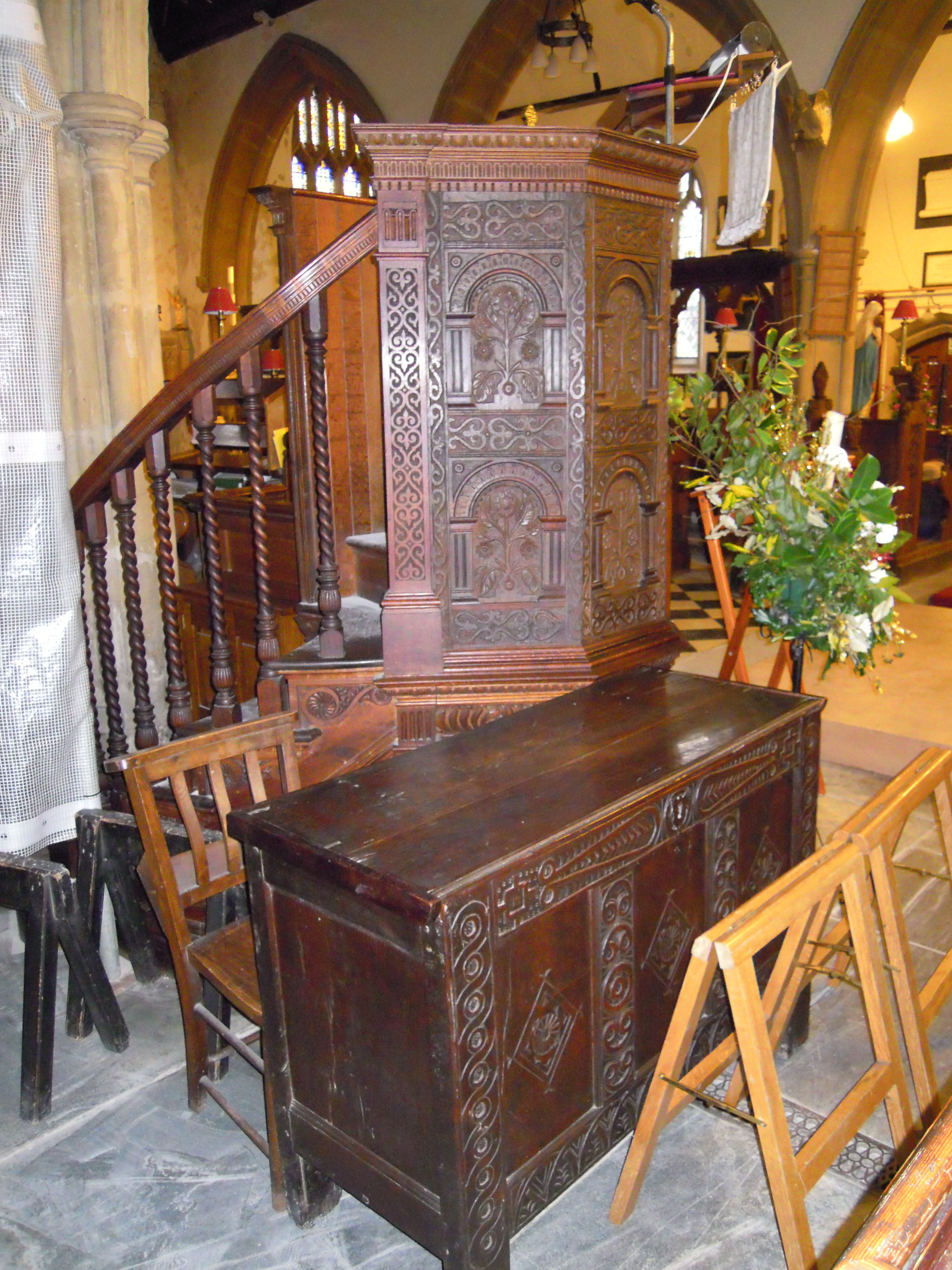
The Elizabethan pulpit

Standing on the site of a Saxon church, the Norman church was enlarged to its present size in 1322, and the tower was incorporated inside the building. Built of mostly random rubble slate walls, some rendered, with limestone dressings, the church has one of the finest wagon-roofs in the West Country dating from the 15th-century which is richly carved with bosses, angels, figures and five Green Men in a row. At the East end of the nave above the former rood screen is a ceilure or Glory, with three bays enriched by cross-ribs and much decoration. The chancel ceiling was modernized by George Fellowes Prynne in 1899. The square baptismal font is Norman of about 1160 and is decorated with three rosettes and ears of wheat on each face with a scalloped underside. It was moved to its present position in 1861 during the 1861–1864 restoration by John Hayward. The Elizabethan pulpit has arched columns and panels containing floral motifs. The lychgate and the vestry date from 1894 and are by Henry Wilson, the best pupil of J. D. Sedding.

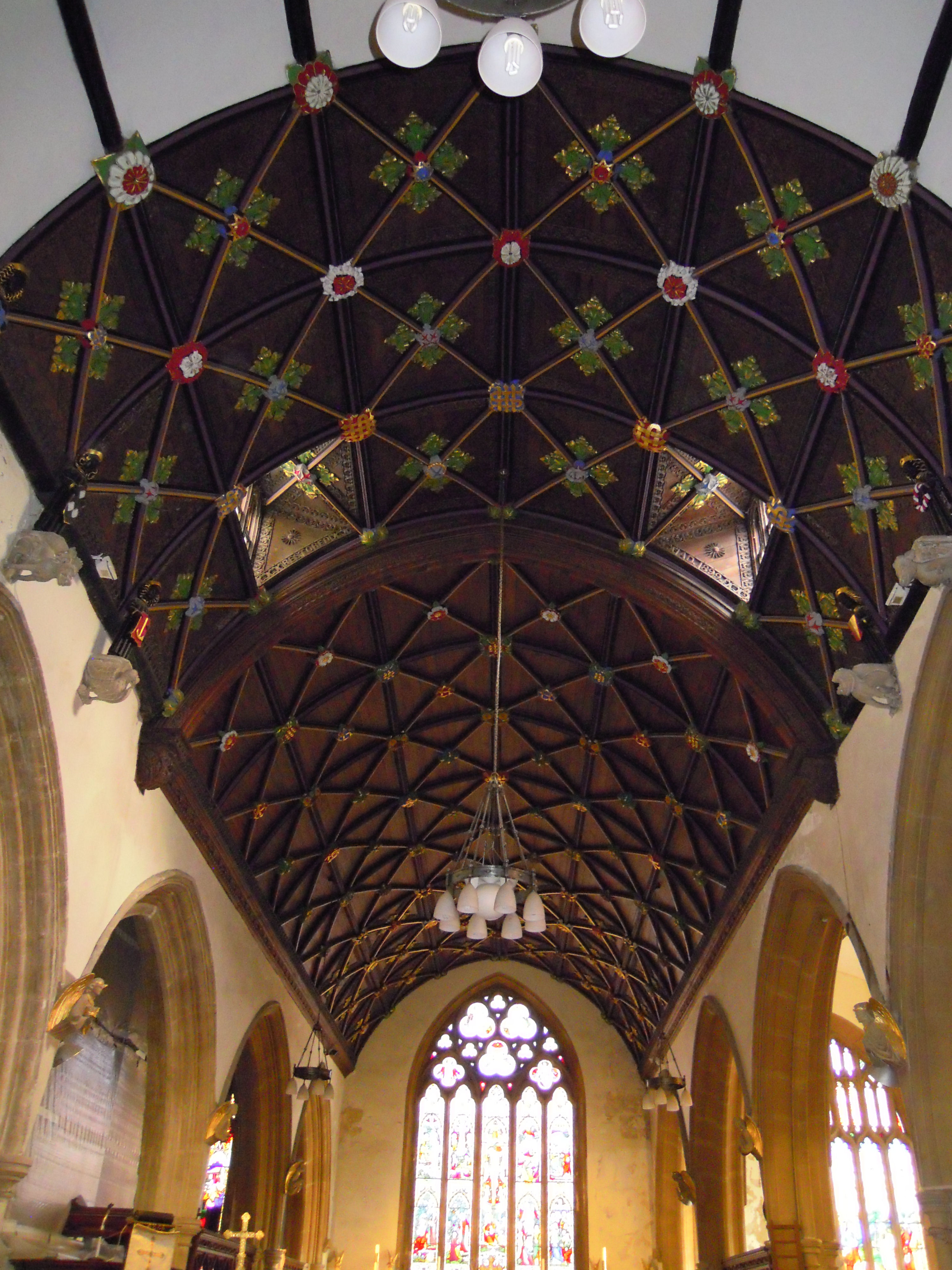
The 'Glory' ceiling is 15th-century

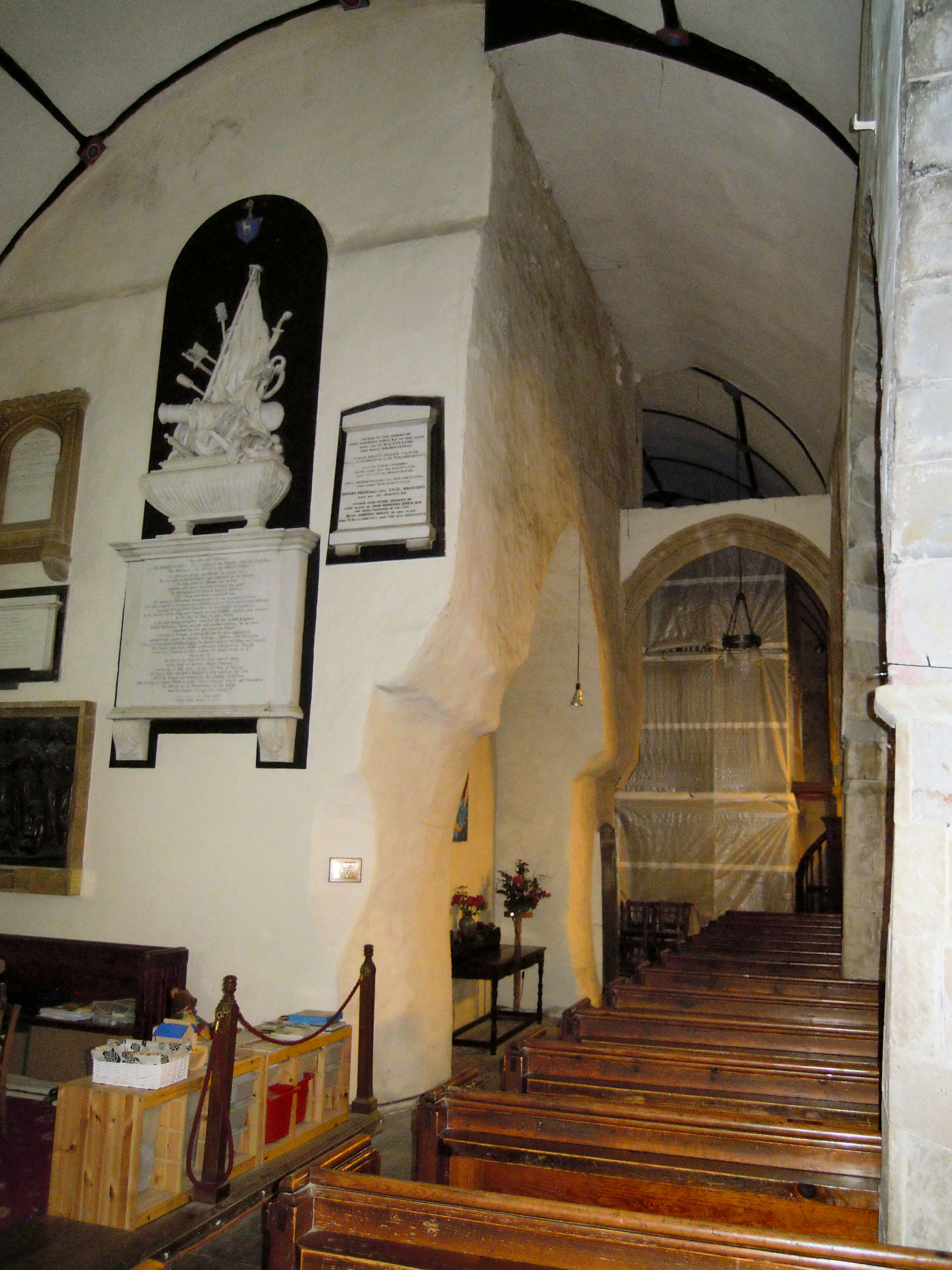
The base of the 14th-century tower

The first recorded Rector was Oliver de Tracey in 1263, which is also the approximate date of the first stone building on the site. Little remains of this church, ordered to be enlarged in 1321 by Walter de Stapledon, Bishop of Exeter when the nave was lengthened and the aisles added. The tower is 14th-century and is the oldest part of the building: it is low, single stage and very plain with a pointed north door, a lancet window and a low unmoulded arch opening into the nave. It is located in a north transeptal position, frequent in early North Devon churches. The north and south aisles are separated from the nave and chancel by eight bays of chamfered arches, four on each side on stunted octagonal piers; these are mid-to late 14th-century, while a piscina of the same date can be found in the chancel. The nave roof rests on stone corbels representing mythical beasts. The chapel in the north of the chancel is early 15th-century, while the aisle windows are from the Perpendicular Period. In the early 15th-century a North chapel was added. The stained glass is 19th-century and includes examples by Kempe (window in North aisle); Hardman (East window); Willement (south aisle East window) and Ballantyne (Stabb Memorial window).

The church has numerous monuments. There is a small brass cross which commemorates six men of the parish who died during World War I. In the churchyard is buried Anna Catherine Parnell, the Irish nationalist and younger sister of Charles Stewart Parnell. Also in the churchyard are buried 19 British servicemen who died during World War I and whose graves are maintained by the Commonwealth War Graves Commission (CWGC) along with those of two Belgian Foreign Nationals.
