= St Paul's Church, Gulworthy =

Church in Devon, England

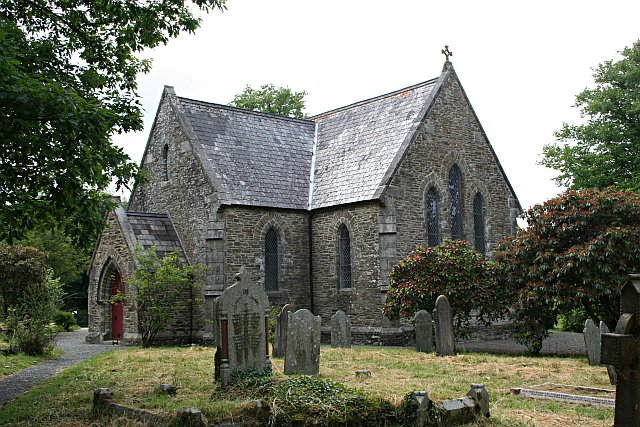
- St Paul's Church, viewed from the churchyard
- St Paul's Church, Gulworthy
- OS grid reference: SX 44784 72734
- Location: 50°32′01″N 04°11′30″W
- Country: England
- Denomination: Church of England
- Churchmanship: Central churchmanship
- Website: gulworthychurch.wordpress.com

History
- Dedication: Saint Paul
- Consecrated: 5 July 1856

Architecture
- Heritage designation: Grade II listed

Specifications
- Materials: Granite, Hurdwick Stone

Administration
- Province: Canterbury
- Diocese: Exeter
- Parish: Gulworthy

St Paul's Church is a Church of England Church in Gulworthy, Devon and is one of the central buildings in the disparate parish, together with the neighbouring school. It is a Grade II listed building.

== History ==
In the mid-1800s, the Gulworthy area was the centre of substantial mining activity and the population increased rapidly Francis Sackville Russell, the 7th Duke of Bedford gave land for the church and neighbouring school to be built to cater for "the spiritual and educational needs" of the community.

The church was built of granite and the local Hurdwick stone and was consecrated on 5 July 1856

== Current day ==
The church is now run as part of the benefice of St Eustachius Tavistock, and shares clergy with the Tavistock church and the Tavy Mission Community. Regular services are only held on Sunday mornings.

The church is notable for having replaced its heating system in 2008 with an environmentally-friendly biomass boiler burning wood pellets.
