= Church of St John the Evangelist, Plymouth =

Church in Devon, England

Coordinates: 50.3702°N 4.1283°W

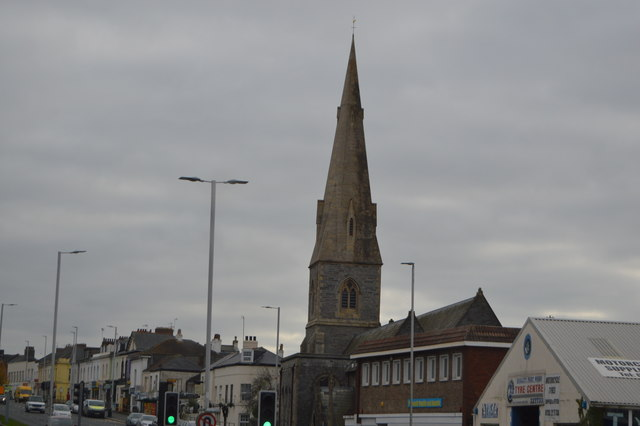
Church of St John the Evangelist

The Church of St John the Evangelist in Plymouth, Devon, England is a grade II listed Anglican parish church. It was built 1851-1855 by Benjamin Ferrey, who had been a pupil of Pugin.

It is in the ecclesiastical parish of "Saint John the Evangelist Sutton-on-Plym with Saint Simon Plymouth and Saint Mary the Virgin Laira" in the Diocese of Exeter and is part of the Sacred Heart Mission Community.

The church was consecrated on 21 June 1855. It is built of rag-stone dressed with sandstone. The Lady Chapel in the north aisle was built in 1883 and was bomb-damaged during World War II but rebuilt in 1955.
