= Mike Harrison (bishop) =

Anglican bishop of Exeter

The Right Reverend Mike Harrison
- Bishop of Exeter
- Diocese: Diocese of Exeter
- In office: 25 September 2024 – present
- Predecessor: Robert Atwell
- Other posts: Director of Mission and Ministry, Diocese of Leicester (2006 to 2016); Bishop of Dunwich (2016–2024)

Orders
- Ordination: 1990 (deacon); 1991 (priest)
- Consecration: 24 February 2016 by Justin Welby

Personal details
- Born: Michael Robert Harrison; 7 March 1963 (age 63)
- Spouse: Rachel
- Children: Four
- Education: Selwyn College, Cambridge; Ripon College Cuddesdon; Union Theological Seminary; King's College London; University of Bradford

Michael Robert Harrison (born 7 March 1963) is a British Anglican bishop who has served as the Bishop of Exeter in the Church of England since 2024. He was previously the Bishop of Dunwich, a suffragan bishop in the Diocese of St Edmundsbury and Ipswich, from February 2016 until September 2024; from 2006 to 2016, he was the Director of Mission and Ministry in the Diocese of Leicester.

== Early life and education ==
Harrison was born on 7 March 1963. He studied mathematics and statistics at Selwyn College, Cambridge, and graduated from the University of Cambridge with a Bachelor of Arts (BA) degree in 1984. He then worked in London as a management consultant and a social worker.

Harrison trained for ordination and studied theology at Ripon College Cuddesdon, an Anglican theological college, and graduated with a BA degree in 1989. He then spent a year studying at the Union Theological Seminary in New York City, United States, and graduated with a Master of Sacred Theology (STM) in 1990.

During the early years of his ordained ministry, Harrison also undertook postgraduate research. He studied doctrine at King's College London, and graduated with a Doctor of Philosophy (PhD) degree in 1997. His doctoral thesis was titled "Sharing in the life of God - a study of participation in Christian thought". He studied international development at the University of Bradford, and graduated with a Master of Arts (MA) degree in 1999.

== Ordained ministry ==
Harrison was ordained in the Church of England as a deacon in 1990 and as a priest in 1991. From 1990 to 1994, he served his curacy at St Anne and All Saints, South Lambeth, in the Diocese of Southwark. He then moved to the Diocese of Bradford, where he was chaplain to the University of Bradford, and to Bradford and Ilkley Community College. During this time, he also served as the Diocesan World Development Advisor.

In 1998, Harrison returned to the Diocese of Southwark. He was Vicar of Holy Trinity, Eltham, between 1998 and 2006. From 2005 to 2006, he also served as Rural Dean of Eltham and Mottingham. He then moved to the Diocese of Leicester where he served as the Director of Ministry and Mission from 2006 to 2016; in this role his duties include "growing the mission of local parishes ... developing missional leadership, pioneer ministry and fresh expressions of church". In 2006, he was made an honorary canon of Leicester Cathedral.

=== Episcopal ministry ===
On 16 December 2015, Harrison was announced as the next Bishop of Dunwich, the sole suffragan bishop in the Diocese of St Edmundsbury. On 24 February 2016, he was consecrated a bishop during a service at Westminster Abbey. He was installed as the Bishop of Dunwich at St Edmundsbury Cathedral on 27 February.

On 4 June 2024, it was announced that Harrison would be the next Bishop of Exeter, the diocesan bishop of the Diocese of Exeter, from autumn 2024. He legally became Bishop of Exeter on 25 September 2024, when his election to that See was confirmed at Lambeth Palace Chapel.

=== Views ===
In January 2023, Harrison welcomed the Church of England's introduction of blessings of same-sex couples but expressed disappointment that it did not go further: "the faithful, pastoral, loving and just way forward is to extend Holy Matrimony to same-sex couples".

In November 2023, he was one of 44 Church of England bishops who signed an open letter supporting the use of the Prayers of Love and Faith (i.e. blessings for same-sex couples) and called for "Guidance being issued without delay that includes the removal of all restrictions on clergy entering same-sex civil marriages, and on bishops ordaining and licensing such clergy".

== Personal life ==
Harrison is married to Rachel, an occupational therapist. Together, they have four children.
