= Gulworthy =

Hamlet in Devon, England

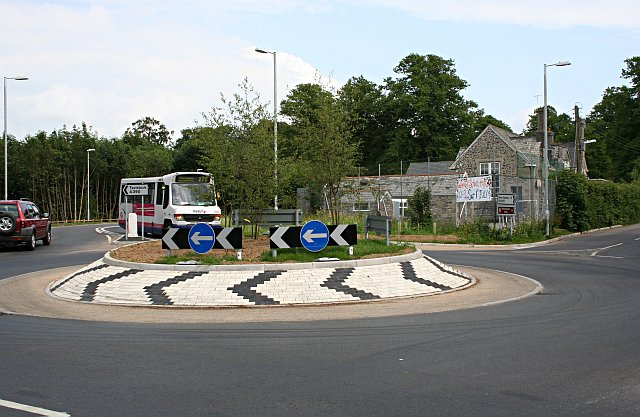
- The roundabout and school

- Location within Devon
- Area: 23.78 km^{2} (9.18 sq mi)
- Population: 518 (2011 census)
  - Density: 22/km^{2} (57/sq mi)
- Civil parish: Gulworthy
- District: West Devon
- Shire county: Devon
- Region: South West
- Country: England
- Sovereign state: United Kingdom

Gulworthy is a hamlet and civil parish in the West Devon district, in Devon, England that adjoins the border with Cornwall. There are a group of buildings by the road junction Gulworthy Cross (50°32′03″N 04°11′33″W) which constitute the centre of the parish. These are Gulworthy School, St Paul's Church and the Parish Hall. In 2011 the parish had a population of 518. However it is part of the electoral ward of Tamarside, the population of Tamarside at the 2011 census was 1,622.

== History ==
The parish was formed on 1 April 1987 from Tavistock Hamlets. It is connected by the sixteenth-century Gunnislake Newbridge to Gunnislake in Cornwall.
