= Hittisleigh =

Village in Devon, England

Coordinates: 50.741°N 3.798°W

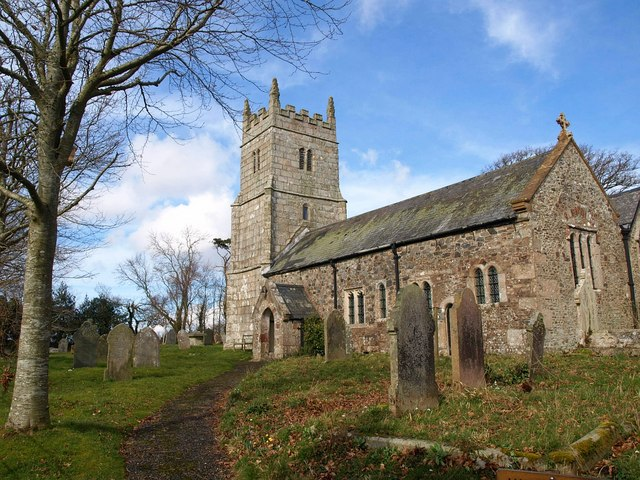
- St Andrew's Church, Hittisleigh

- Location within Devon
- Population: 113
- OS grid reference: SX734954
- District: Mid Devon
- Shire county: Devon
- Region: South West
- Country: England
- Sovereign state: United Kingdom
- Post town: Exeter
- Postcode district: EX6
- Dialling code: 01647
- Police: Devon and Cornwall
- Fire: Devon and Somerset
- Ambulance: South Western
- UK Parliament: Central Devon

Hittisleigh is a small rural parish just north-east of Dartmoor in the Mid Devon district of Devon, England, about 7 miles (11 km) south-west of Crediton. Its largest settlements are the hamlets of Hittisleigh and Hittisleigh Barton.

Once part of the ancient district of the Wonford Hundred, it is now administered by Mid Devon District Council and part of the Central Devon constituency. The name Hittisleigh may be derived from Hyttin's leah (from the Old English for wood/clearing). Alternatively it may come from the Old English hithisce (a family or tenants) and have meant 'tenant's place or pasture'. Although it is difficult to date the initial settlement, Hittisleigh is mentioned in the 1086 Domesday Book, as a place with nine households. Hittisleigh is known as the birthplace of Samuel Bellamy, the 18th-century pirate.

The parish has a church, a village hall, and several farms. In the past it has also boasted a school, public house (The Hunters Inn), post office, blacksmith, bakery and Wesleyan Methodist chapel. These have all closed with the buildings often becoming residential.

The Grade I listed St Andrew's Church at Hittisleigh Barton has a nave and chancel of the 14th century and a 15th-century aisle built of granite. According to John Betjeman, "it was restored late and lovingly" and is "an adorable little church".
