= Church of St Peter, Fremington =

Church in Devon, England

Coordinates: 51°04′23″N 4°07′32″W

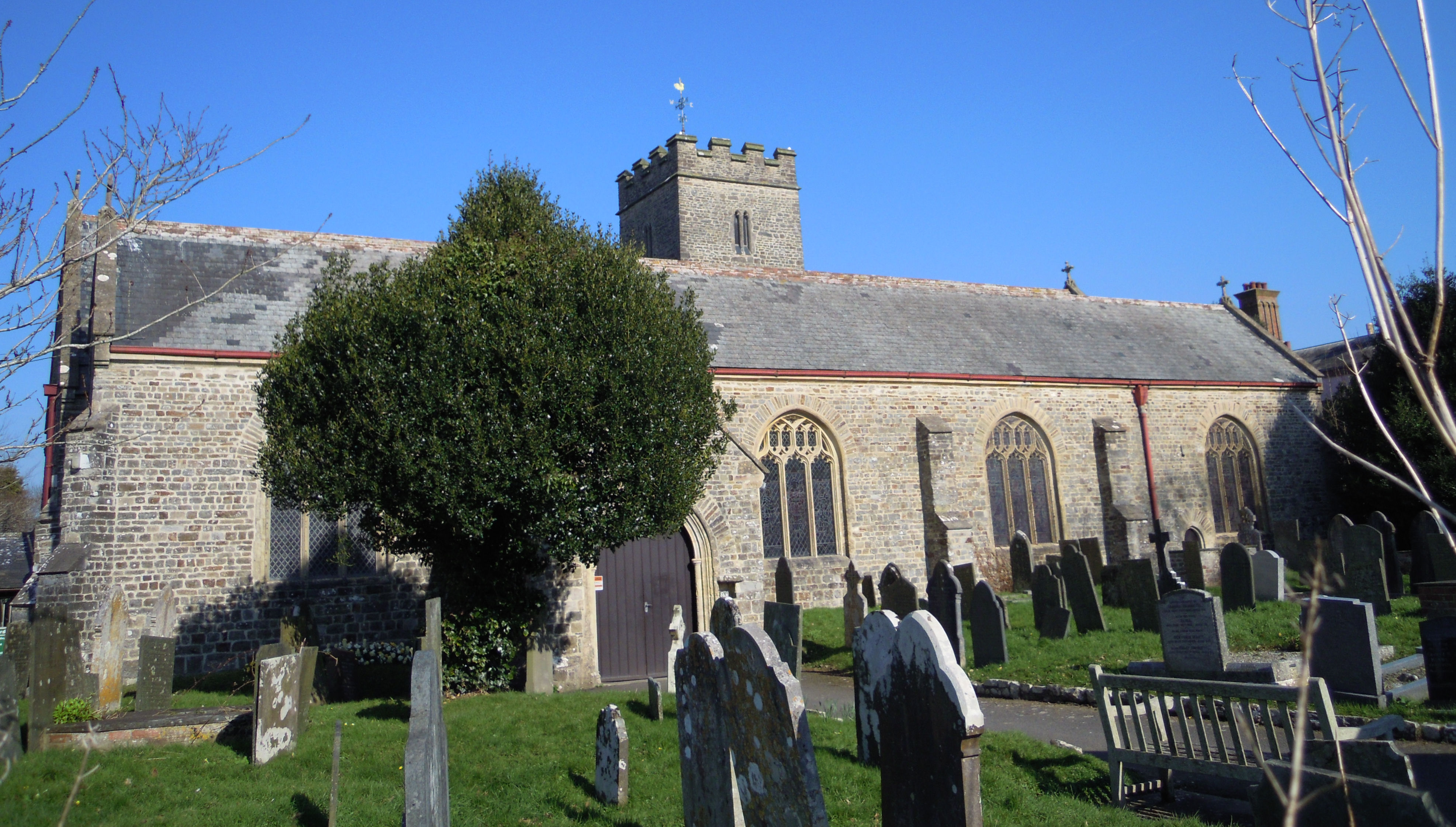
St Peter's church in Fremington

The Church of St Peter is the Anglican parish church for Fremington, now a suburb of nearby Barnstaple but at one time a separate village. There has been a church on the site since at least 1268 with the present structure mostly dating to the 13th and 15th-centuries. The church comes under the Diocese of Exeter and has been a Grade II* listed building since 1965.

== History and design ==
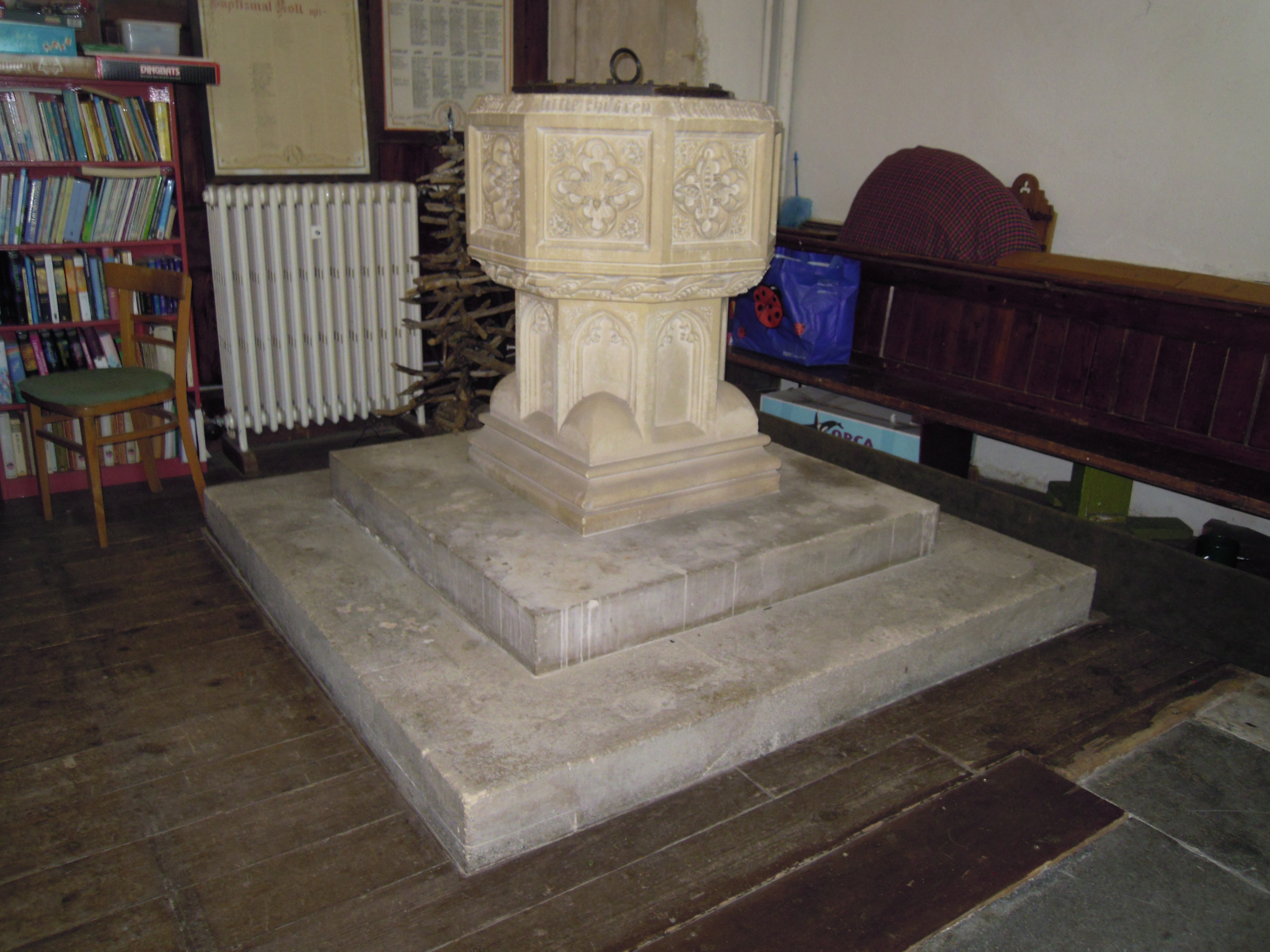
The baptismal font dates to 1867

It is known that there has been a church on the site since at least 1268 when the first chaplain, Roger, was appointed, and there is substantial evidence of Norman construction following the Norman Conquest of 1066. Built of roughly coursed stone rubble with ashlar dressings, the porch and the bell tower are the oldest parts of the church with their remains of Norman arches dating to the 12th and 13th-centuries. Recessed into the outside wall to the right of the church door is a holy water font or stoup which is pre-Reformation and which would have been used for making the sign of the cross before entering the church. The square tower may originally have had a lead-covered spire, removed for unknown reasons. Between the 13th and 15th-centuries the church was enlarged and embellished so that it now comprises two aisles with two parallel roofs, one smaller than the other and decorated with Perpendicular-style pillars and arches.

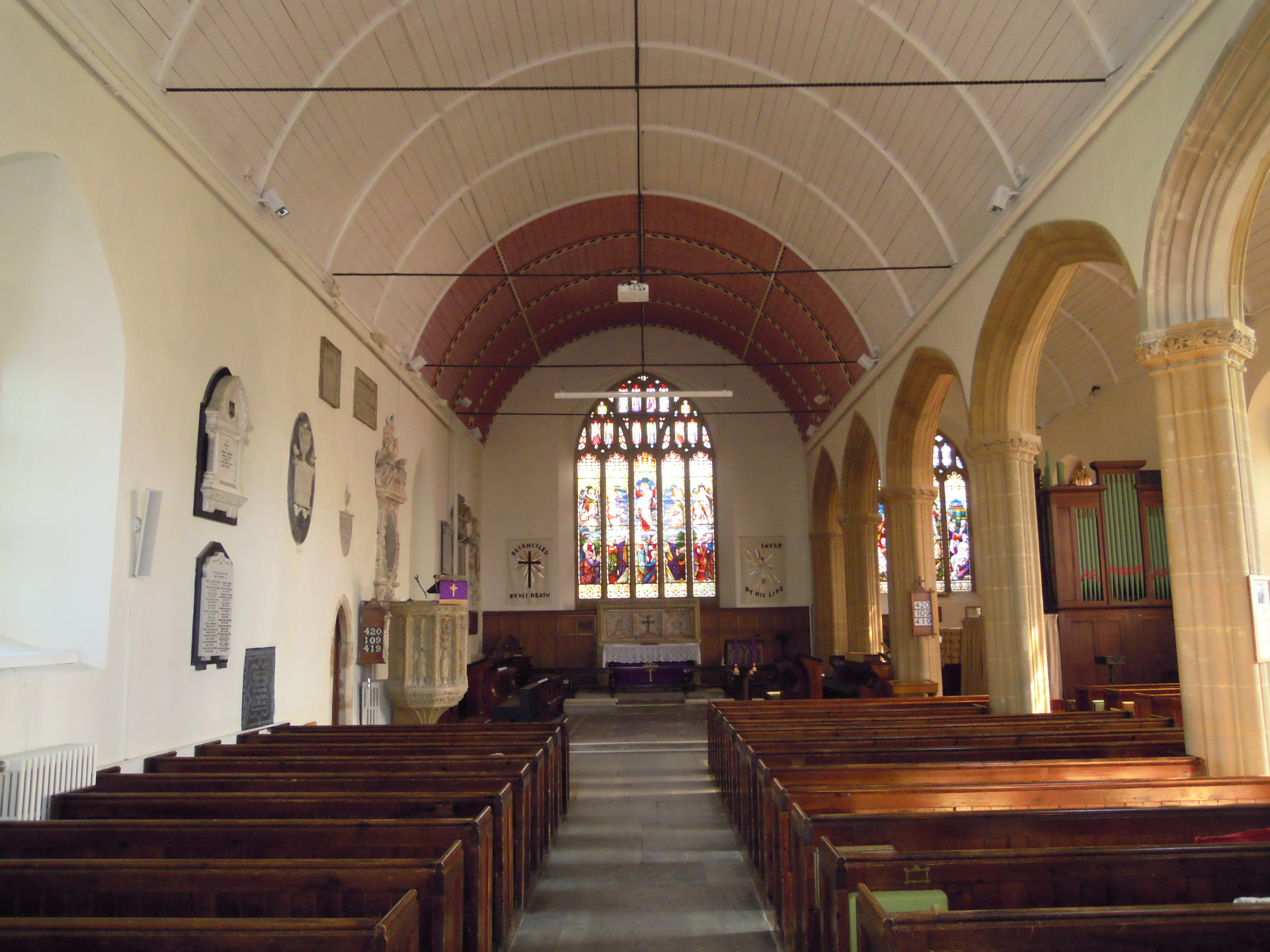
View down the nave towards the chancel

In 1813 the ancient pillars and a "rich and elegant" Gothic rood screen were removed and replaced by far less elegant columns. At this time a singing gallery was added at the back of the church in order to accommodate a string band while the window frames with their fine tracery were also removed. However, in 1866 the architect Sir Gilbert Scott was working nearby in Barnstaple on St Peter's church and his services were secured from 1867 to 1868 at St Peter's in Fremington. Scott reversed the earlier "improvements" with the singing gallery being removed and eight new columns being reintroduced decorated with vines, fruit and faces (some grotesque) connected along the length of the church with Gothic-style arches. New arched stone window frames were inserted and some of the old tracey having been found was placed back in its original position. The church was reopened for worship in 1867.

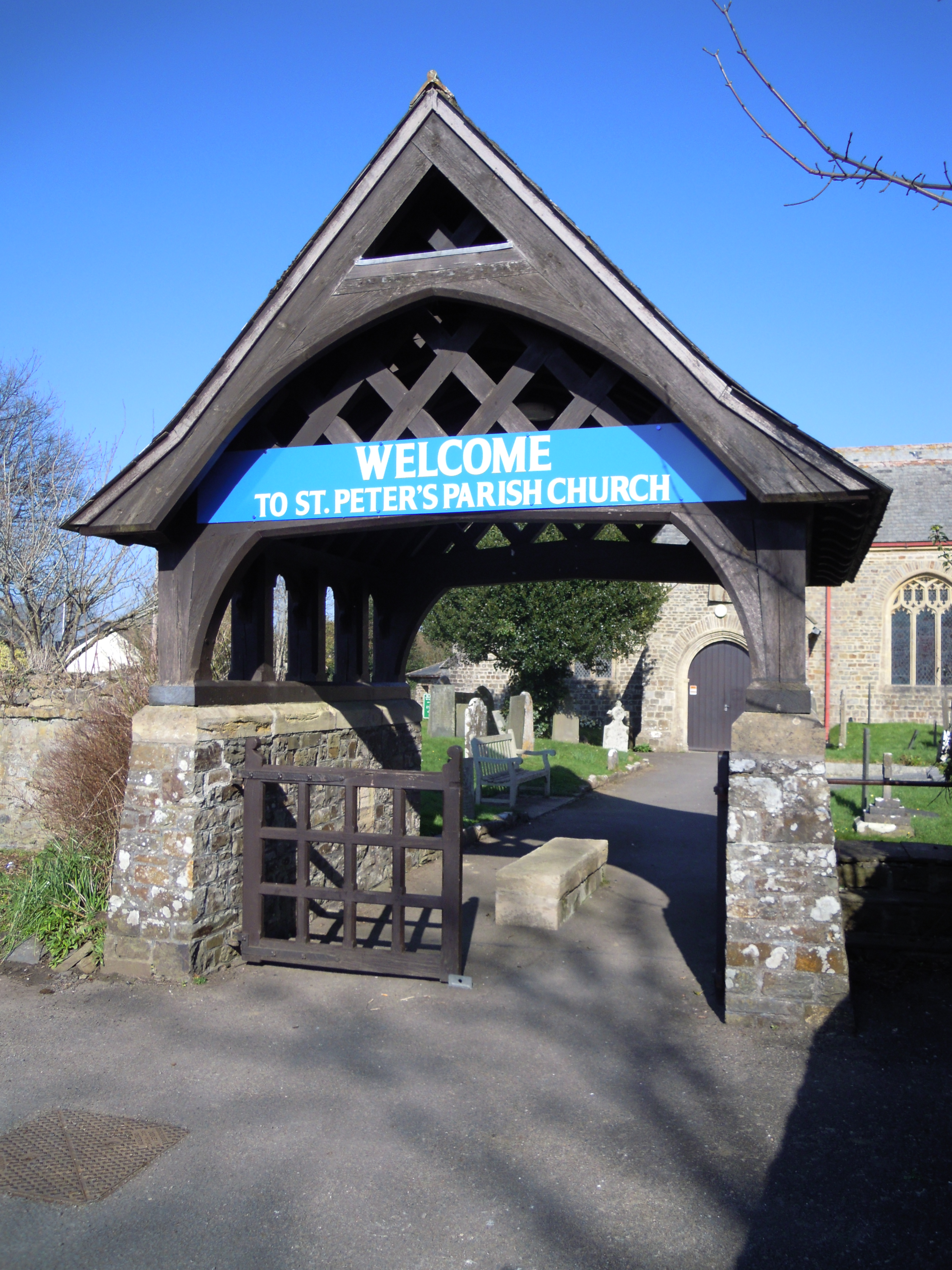
The lychgate was designed by Sir George Gilbert Scott (c1867)

Scott also designed the lychgate which presumably replaced an earlier structure; he incorporated the large rectangular stone traditionally used for resting coffins on into his design. The gates were replaced in the early 21st-century following Scott's original design.

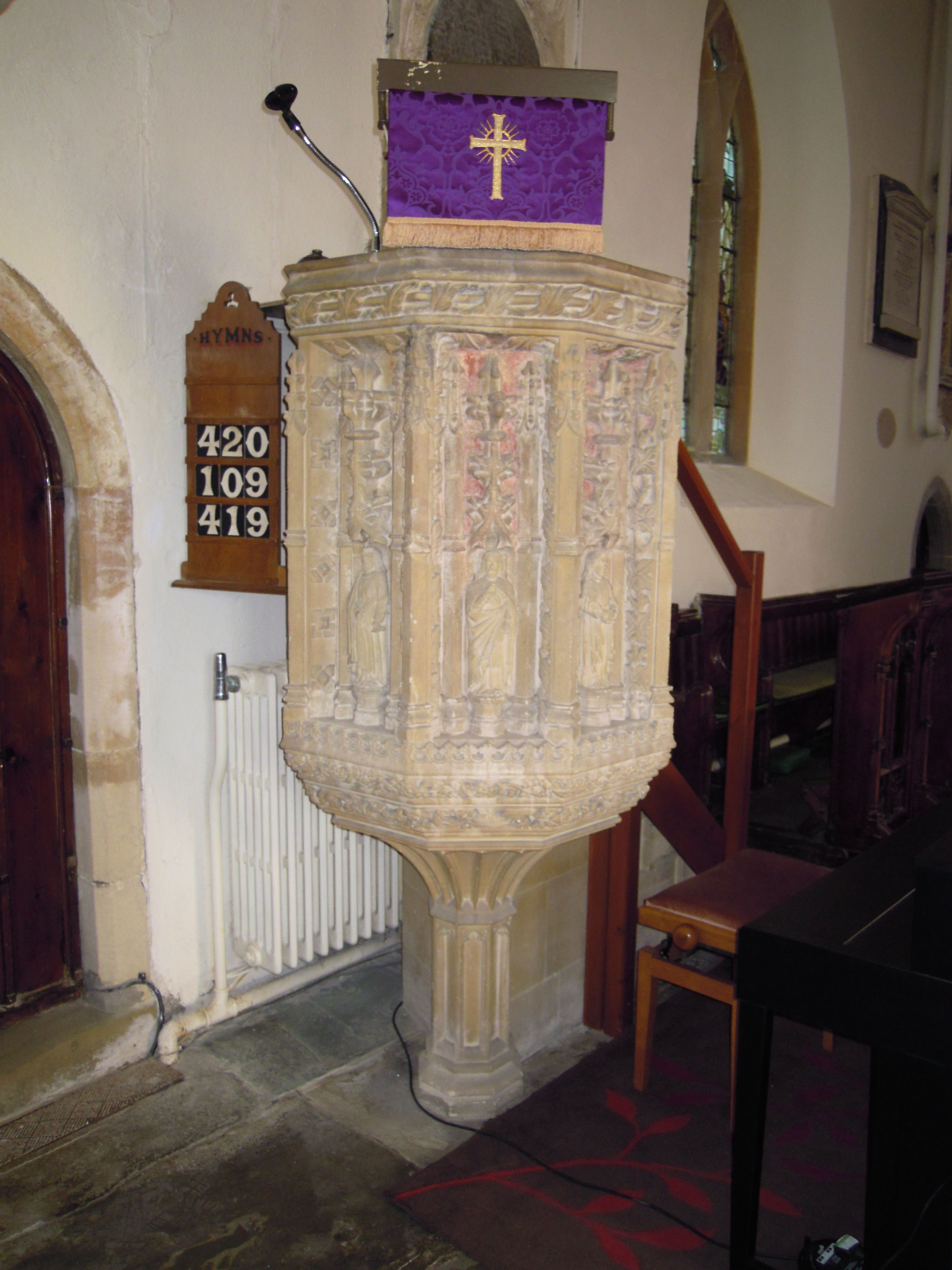
The heavily restored 15th-century pulpit

The wine-glass stone pulpit was unearthed during restoration in the 1860s buried in a mutilated condition beneath the church floor. It is believed to be 15th-century and is decorated with beautifully carved figures of Jesus and the Four Evangelists; it retains some of its original colour but was heavily restored during the 19th-century. The baptismal font dates to 1867 and its fine carvings around the bowl depict Noah's Ark and the dove sent out to find land. Also around the bowl are carved the words of Jesus, "Suffer little children to come unto me, and forbid them not: for of such is the kingdom of God". The church organ with its hand-cranked pianola roll was originally in a private home but was donated to the church where it was installed in 1907. It has a range of fifty-six notes and was rebuilt in 2002. There is a fragment of a medieval wall painting on the south wall which shows two angels and two towers of the Holy City.

The reredos is of alabaster and Caen stone with the symbols Alpha and Omega (the first and last) carved on either side of the marble cross. The altar table is Elizabethan. Above the main door is a large painted panel depicting the Royal Coat of Arms of Queen Anne which was placed here sometime between 1707 and her death in 1714, as the insignia shown are those of the monarch after the Acts of Union of 1707.

The stained glass is 19th and 20th-century and variously depicts Jesus blessing the Little Children; the Pharisee and the Tax Collector; the Good Shepherd; the Raising of Jairus' Daughter; Jesus as a Fisher of Men; the Resurrection, and the Parable of the Good Samaritan. The bell tower contains a peal of six bells with two medieval bells no longer in use and stored in the bell chamber. The wall monuments and tablets are to Susanna Davie, (d.1694), with its oval medallion swathed with drapery, a scallop and skull to the base and amorini to each side. There is an undated memorial to Richard Slowly with its broken pediment and central achievement. A slate tablet is dedicated to George Bragg of Loveacot (d.1629). There are five diamond-shaped hatchments with painted arms and a large 18th-century wall monument to the Harding family.
