= Church of St John the Baptist, Barnstaple =

Church in Barnstaple, Devon, England

Coordinates: 51.0709°N 4.0466°W

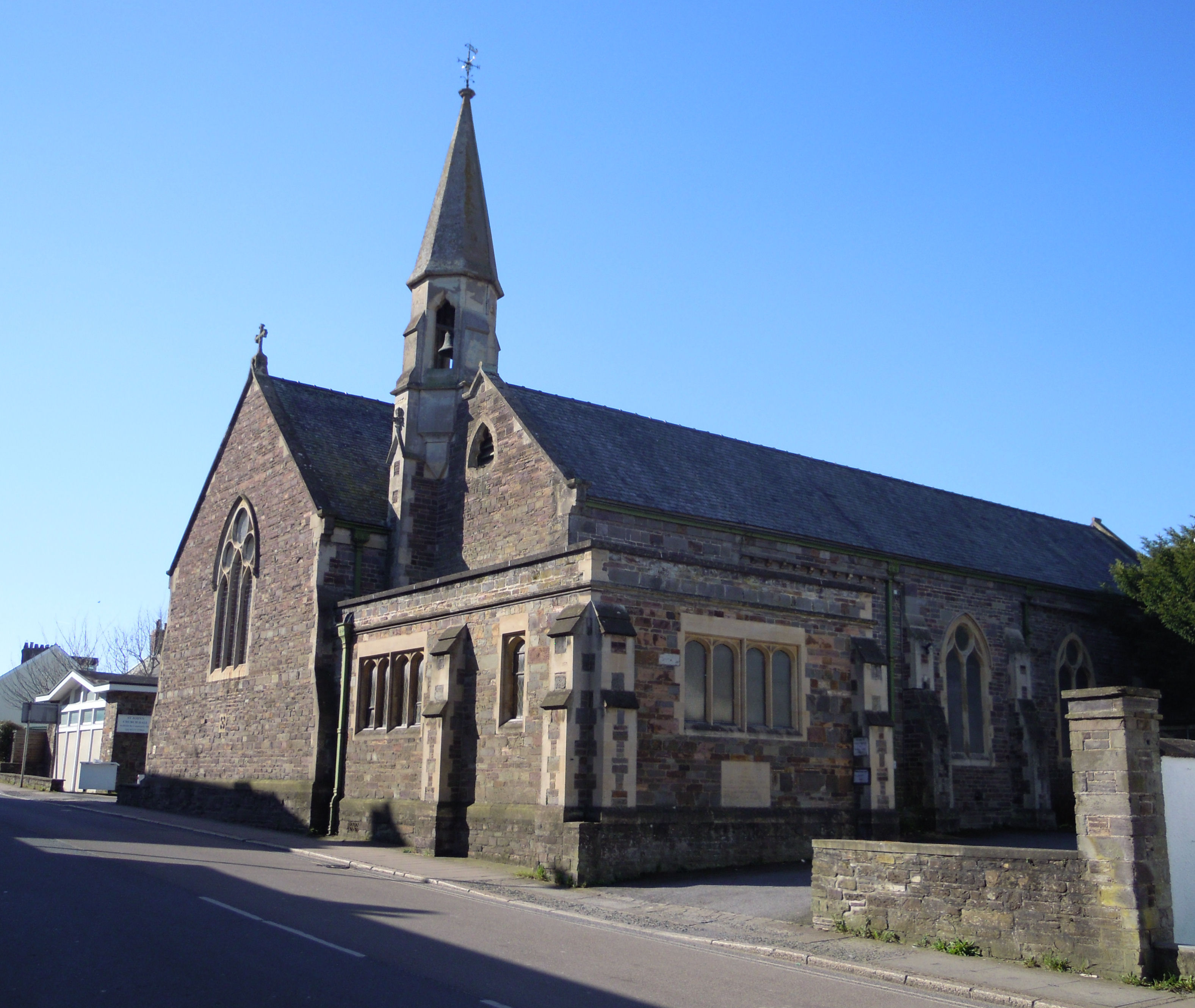
Church of St John the Baptist in Newport

The Church of St John the Baptist on South Street in Barnstaple in Devon is the Anglican parish church for the Newport area of the town. The church comes under the Diocese of Exeter.

The original church of 1829 before demolition

In 1829 a church was built on the site of a former medieval chapel as a chapel of ease for the community of Newport within the parish of Bishop's Tawton. The parish became independent in 1847, at which time the church building was in urgent need of repair. The current building was completed in 1882. The nave, chancel, north aisle, vestries and the north porch are built of local limestone. In the 1960s a church hall was built adjacent to the church and linked to it by a covered walkway.

On the north wall of the church is a memorial to the men of the parish who lost their lives during World War II. The choir vestry, a new bell and windows on the north side of the church were added in 1929 in commemoration of the church's centenary, with celebrations being led by Lord William Cecil, Bishop of Exeter.
