= St Andrew's Church, Hittisleigh =

Church in Devon, England

Coordinates: 50°44′41″N 3°47′46″W

St Andrew's Church
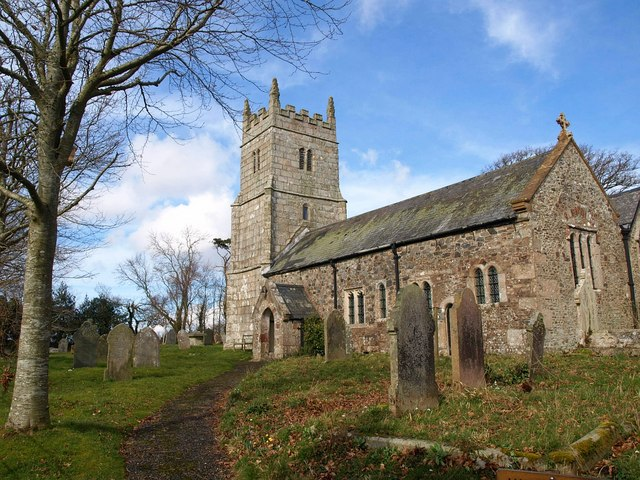
- St Andrew's Church, Hittisleigh in 2010
- St Andrew's Church
- OS grid reference: SX 73367 95445
- Location: Hittisleigh, Devon
- Country: England
- Denomination: Anglican
- Website: Official website

History
- Status: Parish church

Architecture
- Heritage designation: Listed Grade I

St Andrew's Church, Hittisleigh, is an Anglican parish church in Hittisleigh in Mid Devon. It is listed Grade I on the National Heritage List for England.

It was restored in 1914 and 1967. The tower dates from the late 15th century.
