= Creacombe =

Village in Devon, England

Coordinates: 50.966666°N 3.683333°W

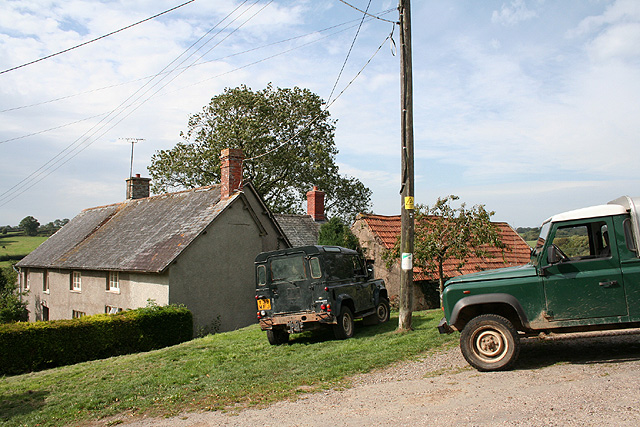
- A farmhouse in Creacombe

- Location within Devon
- OS grid reference: SS8189319932
- Civil parish: Rackenford
- District: North Devon
- Shire county: Devon
- Region: South West
- Country: England
- Sovereign state: United Kingdom
- Post town: TIVERTON
- Postcode district: EX16
- Police: Devon and Cornwall
- Fire: Devon and Somerset
- Ambulance: South Western
- UK Parliament: North Devon

Creacombe is a small village and former civil parish, now in the parish of Rackenford, in the North Devon district of Devon, England. Its nearest town is Tiverton, which lies approximately 9.4 miles (15.1 km) south-west from the village, just off the A361 road. In 1961 the civil parish had a population of 52. On the 1 April 1986 the civil parish was abolished and merged with Rackenford.
