= Deanery of Christianity (Exeter) =

Administrative unit of the Church of England

The Deanery of Christianity is a deanery in the Archdeaconry of Exeter, Diocese of Exeter. The deanery covers most of the city of Exeter. It takes the name "Christianity" because there is a tradition that a diocese and a deanery should not share the same name.

== Benefice of Alphington (St Michael and All Angels) ==
Parishes within the mission community:

- St Michael and All Angels, Alphington
- St George, Shillingford St George
- St Ida, Ide

Clergy:

- Mike Partridge - rector and priest in charge

== Benefice of Cathedral (St Peter) ==
Clergy:

- Jonathan Draper - Dean of Exeter
- Carl Turner - canon precentor
- Andrew Godsall - canon chancellor
- Paul Avis - canon theologian
- Ian Morter - canon treasurer

== Benefice of Central Exeter (St Stephen, St Mary Arches, St Olave, St Pancras, St Petrock) ==
Parishes within the benefice:

- St Stephen with St Mary Arches
- St Olave with St Pancras and St Petrock

Clergy:

- Jonathan Draper - priest in charge-designate
- Ann Hall - assistant curate (NSM)
- Sheila Swarbrick - assistant curate (NSM)

== Benefice of Countess Wear (St Luke) ==
Clergy:

- Richard Jeffery Priest in charge of Countess Wear

== Benefice of Exeter St David (St David with St Michael and All Angels) ==
Clergy:

== Benefice of Exeter St James (St James) ==
Clergy:

- Henry Pryse Rector of St James′

== Benefice of Exeter St Leonard with Holy Trinity (St Leonard and Holy Trinity) ==
Clergy:

- Simon Austin Rector of St Leonard's
- Chris Keane Associate Minister

Other staff:

- Rachel Holyome Youth Minister
- Sophie Gower Associate Women's Minister
- Helen Morrissey Ministry Assistant
- Tom Richards Ministry Assistant
- Jonnie Armstrong Ministry Assistant
- Joanna Raven Ministry Assistant

== Benefice of Exeter St Mark ==
Clergy:

- Rev Tanya Hockley-Still

== Benefice of St Matthew with St Sidwell, Exeter ==
Clergy:

- Rev Ed Hodges (from 22 July 2019)
- Rev Matt Clayton Assistant Curate (Associate Vicar)
- Rev Vanessa Pestridge Assistant Curate

== Benefice of Heavitree and St Mary Steps ==
Parishes within the benefice:

- Heavitree (St Michael and All Angels) with St Lawrence, St Clare and St Paul.
- St Mary Steps (St Mary)
- Trinity Conventional District

Clergy:

- Ben Rabjohns Rector
- Andrew Johnson
- David Apps (Semi-Retired)
- John Fairweather (Semi-Retired)

== Benefice of Exeter St Thomas and Emmanuel ==
Parishes within the benefice:

- Exeter St Thomas (St Thomas the Apostle) with St Andrew
- Exeter Emmanuel (Emmanuel) with St Philip

Clergy:

- Nicholas Edwards, Team Rector
- Anne Dowdeswell, Team Vicar
- Georgina Vye, Curate

== Benefice of Exwick (St Andrew) ==
Clergy:

- Jerry Bird, Priest in charge

== Benefice of Whipton (St Boniface with Holy Trinity) ==
Clergy:

- Carl Robinson Priest-in-Charge

== Exeter Network Church: A Bishop’s Mission Order ==
Leaders:

- Jon Soper
- Jo Soper
