= West Down =

Village in Devon, England

Coordinates: 51°09′30″N 4°07′23″W

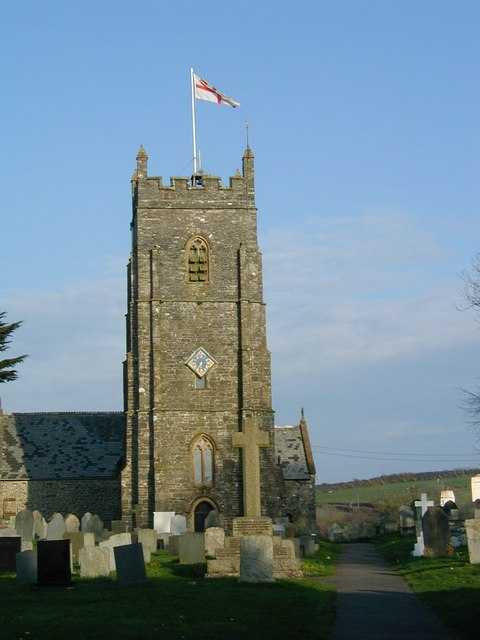
- Parish church of St Calixtus

- Location within Devon
- Population: 671
- Civil parish: West Down
- District: North Devon
- Shire county: Devon
- Region: South West
- Country: England
- Sovereign state: United Kingdom
- Post town: ILFRACOMBE
- Postcode district: EX34
- Police: Devon and Cornwall
- Fire: Devon and Somerset
- Ambulance: South Western

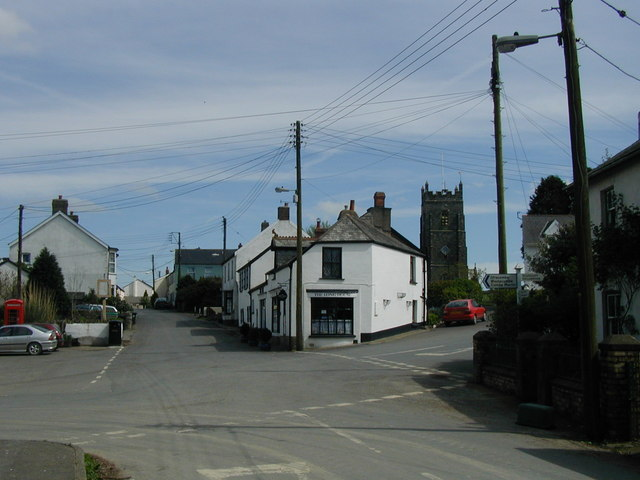
The centre of the village

West Down is a small village and civil parish located in North Devon, England. It is to be found on the route between Braunton and Ilfracombe, 9 miles (14 km) north-west of Barnstaple. The village sits in a bowl in the hills at 450 feet (140 m) above sea level. In 2011 its population was 671.

West Down's church is dedicated to St Calixtus and its first recorded priest was in 1272. The present church dates from the 14th century, partly rebuilt in 1712. Its Norman font was buried in the churchyard in the Civil War and only rediscovered in the 19th century. Many of the village's other older buildings date back to the 17th century.

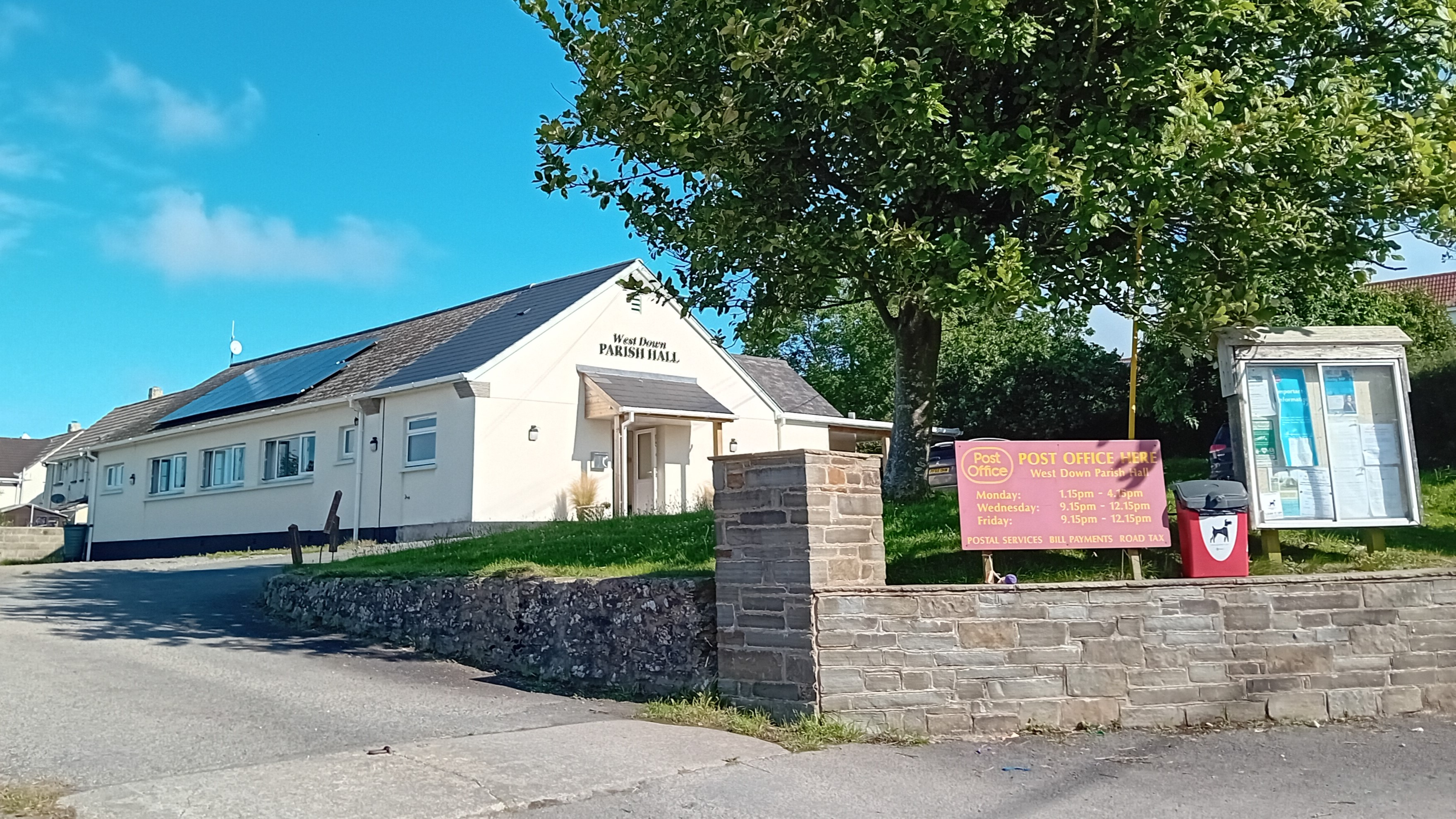
West Down Parish Hall

== Fullabrook Wind Farm ==
For many years controversy surrounded the proposed erection of wind turbines at the local Fullabrook Wind Farm. There was opposition on the grounds that the wind farm would spoil the surrounding landscape and thereby disrupt tourism on which the local economy depends. However, in 2007 the proposals to build 22 wind turbines were given the go-ahead, to become fully operational in 2010.
