= Manor of King's Nympton =

Manor house in Devon, England

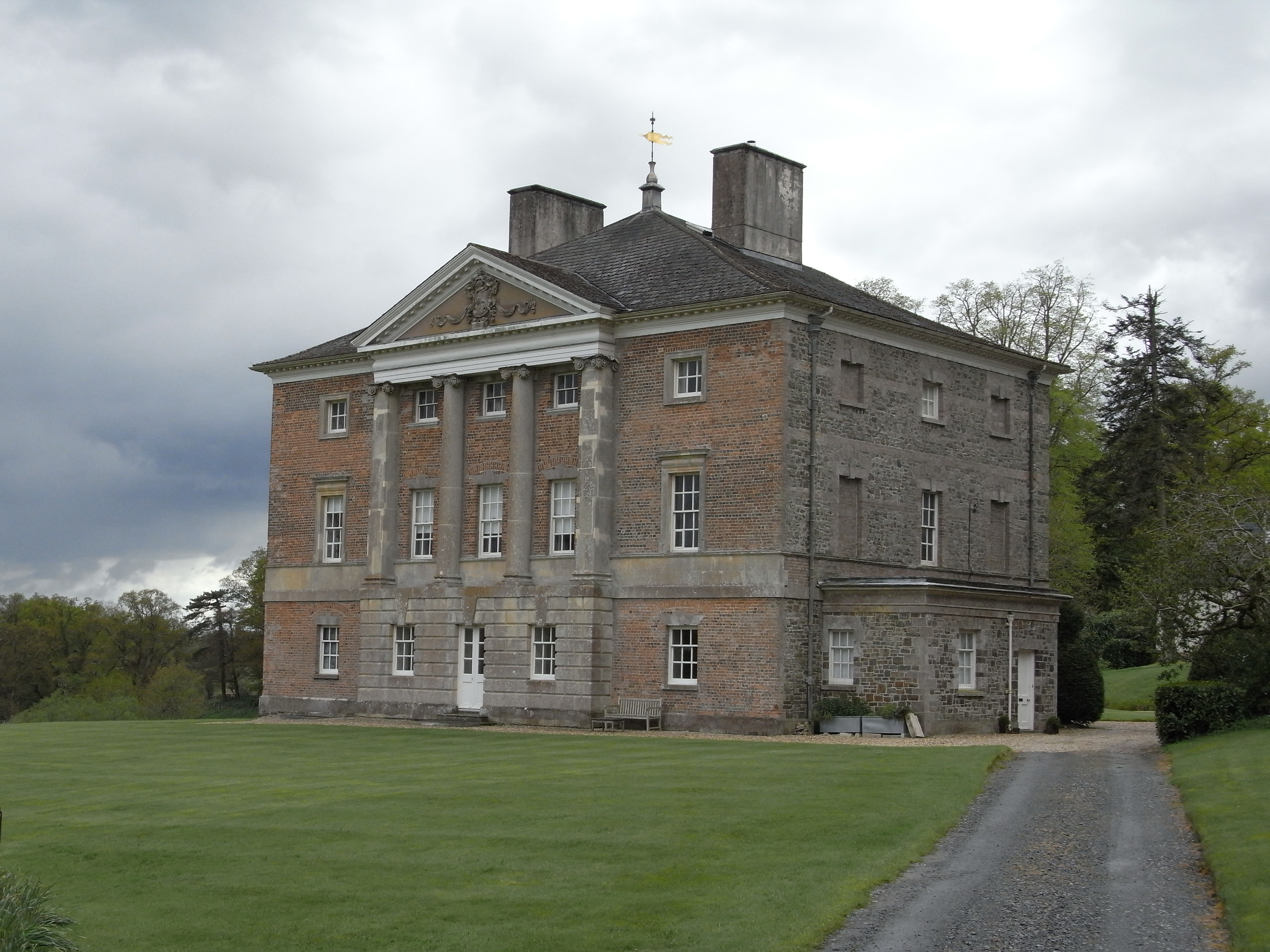
Kings Nympton Park, built as "New Place" by James Buller (1717–1765) between 1746–9 to the design of Francis Cartwright of Blandford in Dorset, based on Marble Hill House in Twickenham, one of the earliest Palladian houses in England built between 1724–9

The Manor of King's Nympton was a manor largely co-terminous with the parish of King's Nympton in Devon, England.

== Descent of the manor ==
At the time of the Domesday Book of 1086, the whole manor of Nimetone, in the hundred of Witheridge, belonged to the King and was held by him in demesne, but King Henry I (1100–1135) granted the manor, together with that of Black Torrington, in Torrington hundred, to Joel de Mayne (Latinised to de Meduana). He appears to have been a resident of Normandy, as when that former possession of the English kings became separated from England, King John (1199–1216) seized it back into royal ownership.

=== de Luscy ===
The manor was probably re-granted by King John (1199–1216), as is known to have been the case with Black Torrington, to Geoffrey de Luscy. The manor subsequently escheated to the crown by cause unknown.

=== de la Zouche ===
King Henry III (1216–1272) granted the manor, again together with Black Torrington, to Roger la Zouche, lord of the manor of North Molton. Risdon states that la Zouche granted the manor to Godfrey Lucy.

=== de Cornwall ===
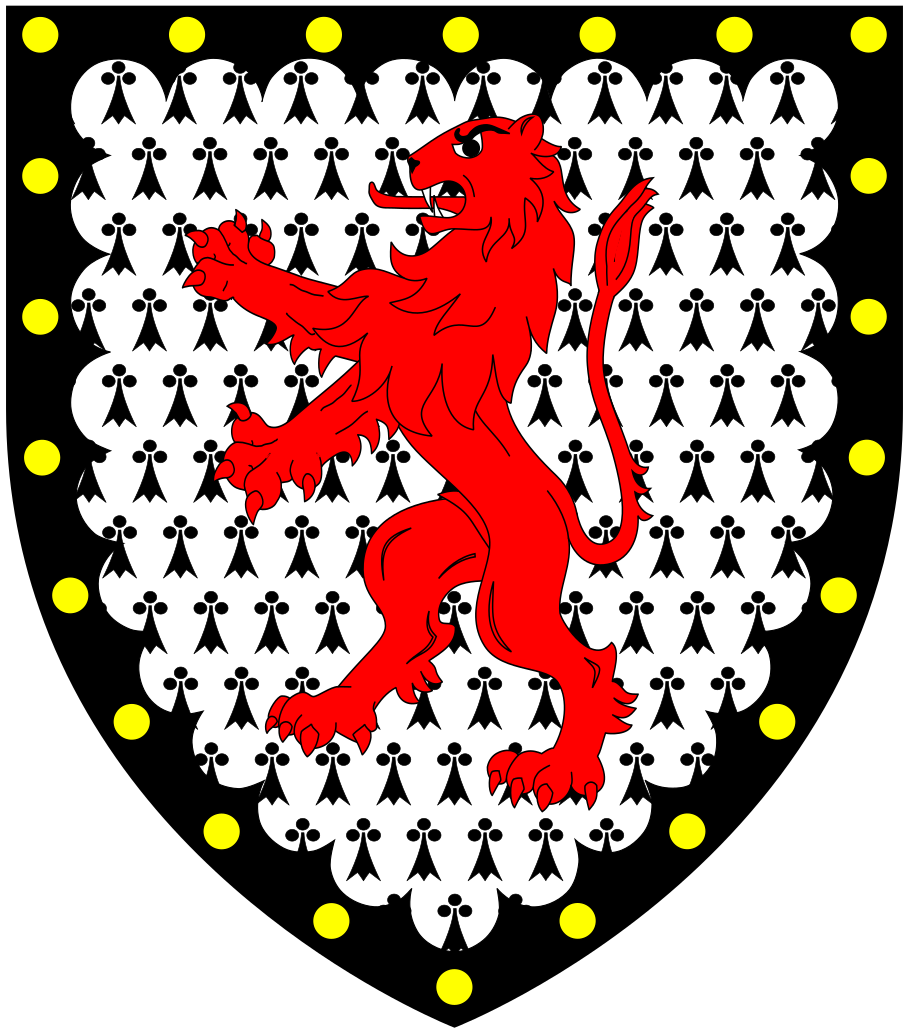
Arms of Sir Jeffrey Cornwall of King's Nympton: Ermine, a lion rampant (gules) a bordure engrailed sable bezantee, These are the arms of Richard, 1st Earl of Cornwall (1209-1272) with differences a bordure engrailed and field ermine

Sir Geoffrey de Cornwall was lord of the manor tempore King Edward III (1327–1377). His heir was a minor and became the ward of Enguerrand VII, Lord of Coucy, Earl of Bedford (1340–1397). He was succeeded successively by Sir Bryan de Cornwall and Sir John de Cornwall, temp Kings Henry IV (1399–1413) and Henry V (1413–1422).

=== Pollard ===
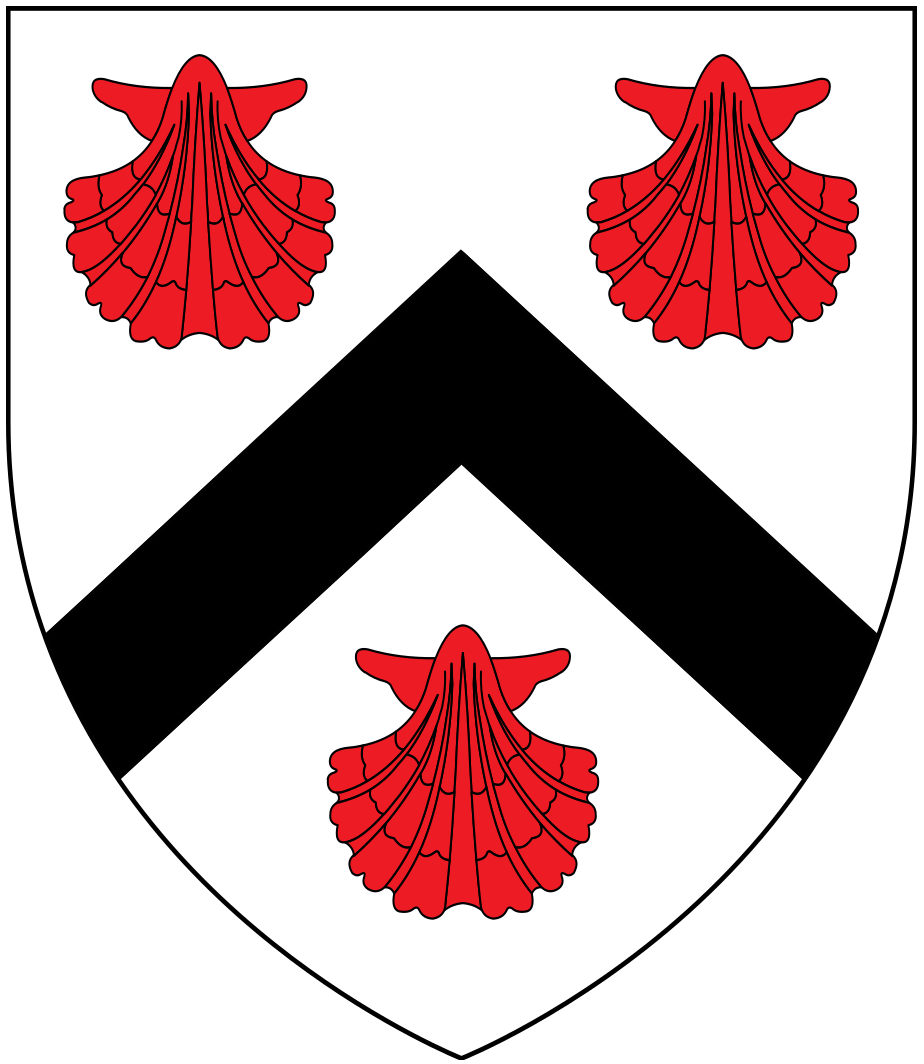
Arms of Pollard of King's Nympton: Argent, a chevron sable between three escallops gules

==== Sir Lewis Pollard (died 1526) ====
The manor of King's Nympton was eventually purchased by Sir Lewis Pollard (c. 1465 – 1526), of Grilstone, Bishop's Nympton, Justice of the Common Pleas from 1514 to 1526 and MP for Totnes in 1491 and JP in Devon in 1492. He enclosed a deer park in the late 15th century. His heir was his eldest son and heir Sir Hugh Pollard.

==== Sir Hugh Pollard (fl. 1545) ====
Sir Hugh Pollard (fl. 1535, 1545), eldest son and heir, great-grandfather of Sir Lewis Pollard, 1st Baronet of King's Nympton. He was Sheriff of Devon in 1335/6 and Recorder of Barnstaple in 1545. He married twice:

- Firstly to Elizabeth Valletort, daughter and heiress of John Valletort of Clyst St Lawrence, by whom he had three sons and one daughter:
  - Sir Lewis Pollard, eldest son and heir. (see below)
  - Richard Pollard
  - John Pollard
  - Elizabeth Pollard, married firstly Richard Bury (1516–1543) lord of the manor of Colleton, Chulmleigh, whose wardship and marriage had been purchased by her father, with the helpful influence of his brother Richard Pollard, the government official. Richard Pollard managed at the same time to persuade Richard Bury's father John Bury (1481–1533) to give him for his own wife his daughter Jacquetta Bury. Secondly Elizabeth Pollard married Henry Dillon (died 1579) of Chimwell, Bratton Fleming, lord of the manor of Bratton Fleming, whose sister Dorothy Dillon was the wife of Elizabeth's cousin Hugh Pollard of Knowstone.

In 1539 Hugh Pollard acquired a 21-year lease of the site and demesne of Torre Abbey at the Dissolution of the Monasteries, and in 1543 acquired the freehold from John St. Leger (died 1596) of Annery.

==== Sir Lewis Pollard (died before 1569) ====
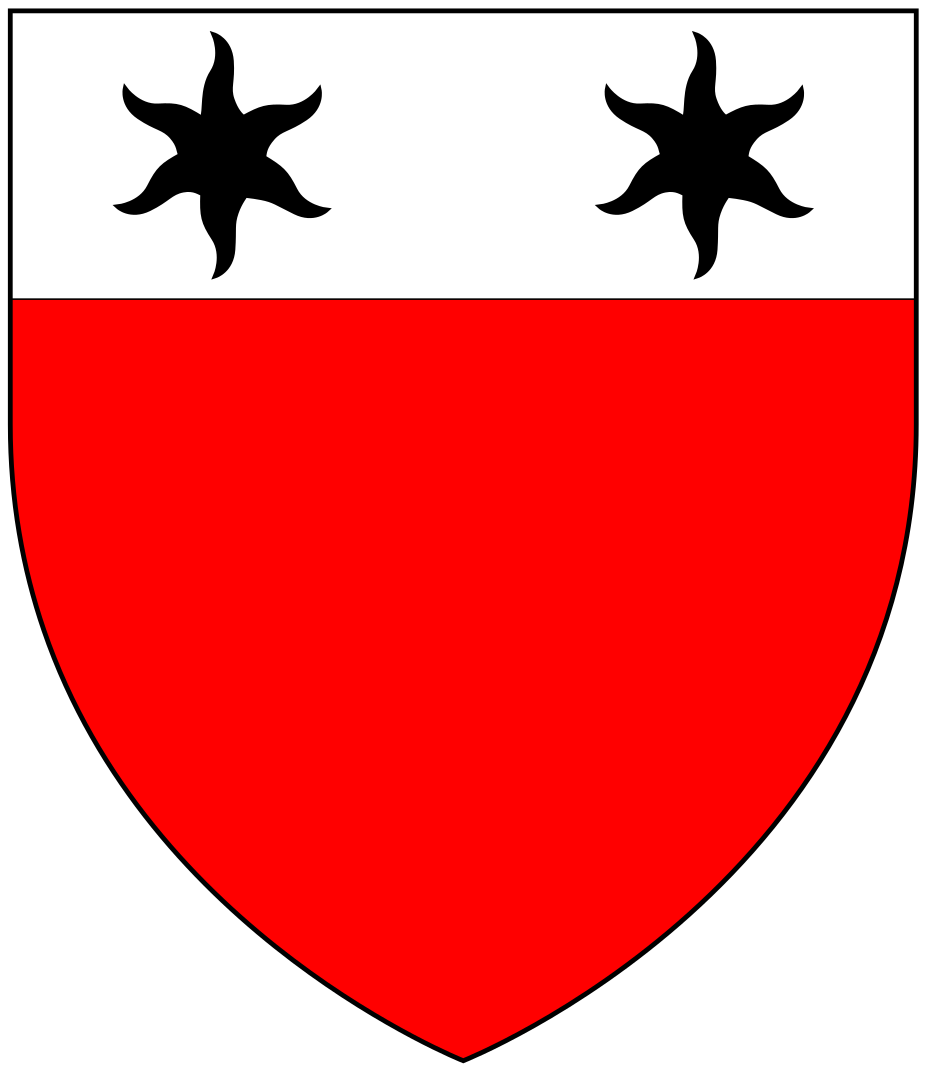
Arms of Prust of Thorry, Hartland: Gules, on a chief argent two estoiles sable

Sir Lewis Pollard (died before 1569), eldest son and heir, was a serjeant-at-law and served as Recorder of Exeter from 1548. He married Joan Prust, daughter and heiress of Hugh Prust, Esquire, (died 1559) of Thorry, near Hartland (alias Thorvey, etc.), who married secondly Sir John Perrot (1528–1592), Lord Deputy of Ireland. The Prust family were settled at "Gorven" from at the latest 1199, a deed of which date is recorded in the Heraldic Visitations of Devon as mentioning John Prust of Gorven. Hugh Prust (died 1559) was the second son of John Prust of Thorry by his wife Agnes. Thorry had been held by an unnamed tenant in 1299 from the Abbot of Hartland for the rent of 1 lb of pepper, due annually at Michaelmas. It was still held in 1566 (from overlord unknown) at the same rent, by the "heirs of Hugh Prust", i.e. the Pollards. In 1530 Hugh Prust gave to St Nectan's Church, Hartland, the set of surviving bench-ends showing his initials "H P" each in its own shield. Hugh Prust was one of the largest tenants of the lands of Hartland Abbey as revealed by the Valor Ecclesiasticus made in 1535 preparatory to its dissolution. Amongst his lands were the lease of the manor of Bykyngton (i.e. Abbots Bickington) which he had leased from the Abbey for 40 years paying £12 per annum rent. This manor became the seat of his descendant Sir Amyas Pollard, 3rd Baronet (died 1701). Hugh Prust was described in a contemporary document as "a man of great wealth and of fair land and living" and had a private chapel at Thorry served by the cleric John Horwell (died 1553), the prior of Hartland Abbey before its dissolution in 1539, who also served as mass-priest in St Mary's Guild, at the sole expense of Hugh Prust. Hugh Prust's other lands held from Hartland Abbey in 1566 were: the whole of: Friar's Hill, Holepark, Thorry and Wembsworthy; part of Elmscott, Hardisworthy, Pitt and Higher Velly. In addition the widow Katherine Prust (possibly the widow of Hugh Prust or of his brother Richard Prust (died 1550) of Wollesworthy) held possibly as her dower: part of Fursdon and Natcott. Lewis Pollard died before 1569 and his infant sons became wards of Sir John Chichester (died 1569) of Raleigh. He left the following children:

- Sir Hugh Pollard, eldest son and heir (see below).
- Lewis Pollard, second son, married Cecilia Chichester, sixth daughter of Sir John Chichester and widow of Thomas Hatch.
- Thomasine Pollard (died 1539), married Admiral Sir George Carew (c. 1504 – 1545), who drowned in the Mary Rose.
- Frances Pollard, who married Sir John Uggan of Pembroke.
- Susan Pollard, who married firstly John Copleston and secondly Sir Anthony Rouse.

==== Sir Hugh Pollard ====
Sir Hugh Pollard, eldest son and heir, married twice:

- Firstly, to Dorothy Chichester. Hugh became on the death of his father a ward of Sir John Chichester (died 1569) of Raleigh, who bequeathed his wardship and marriage to his daughter Dorothy Chichester, who duly married him. They had the following children:
  - Sir Lewis Pollard, 1st Baronet, eldest son and heir (see below)
  - Francis Pollard, second son
  - William Pollard, third son
  - Arthur Pollard, fourth son
  - Hugh Pollard, fifth son
  - Robert Pollard, baptised 1598 at Ashton

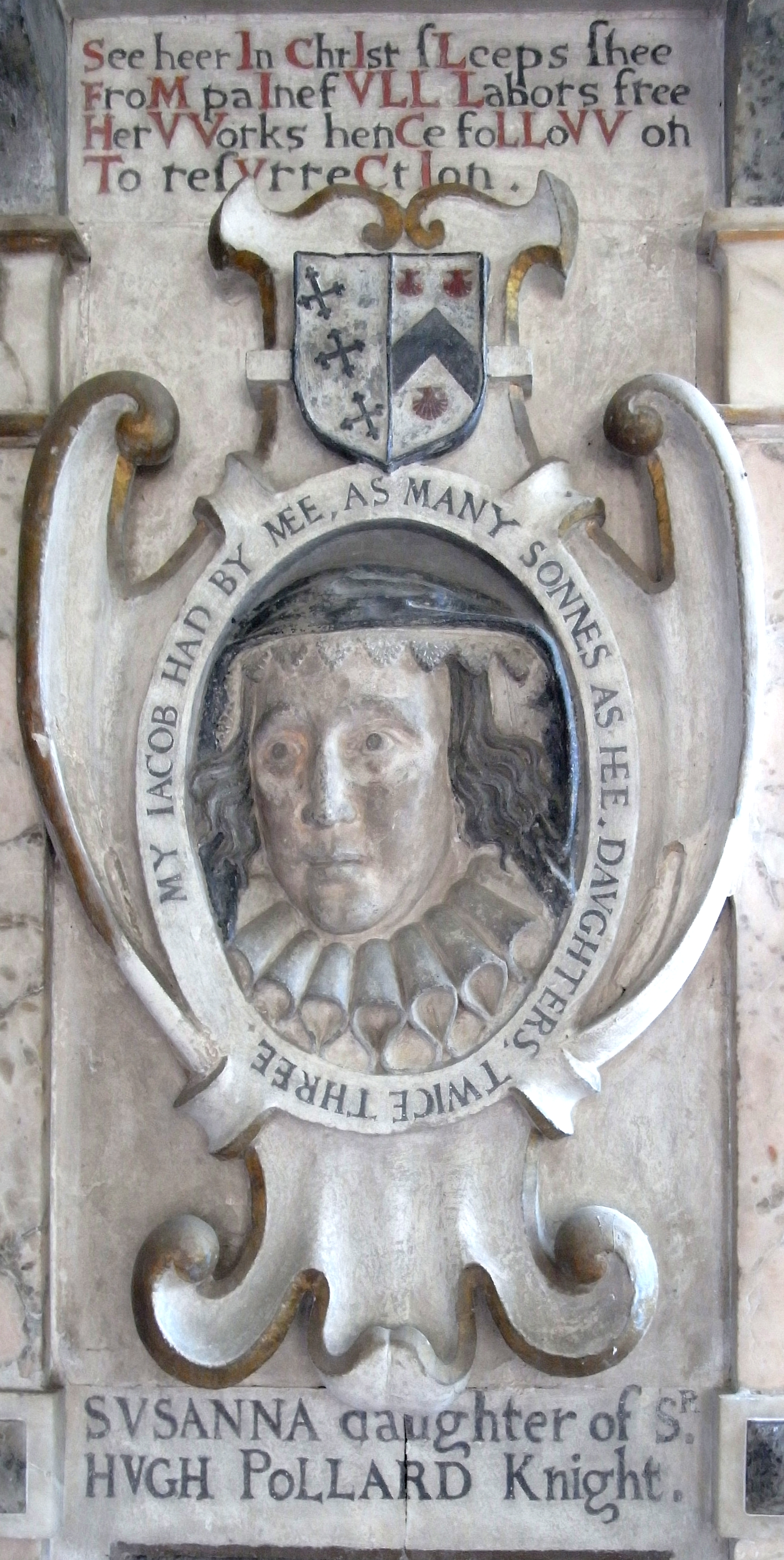
Panel in memory of Susanna Pollard (died 1634), detail from monument to her husband John Northcote (1570–1632), Newton St Cyres Church

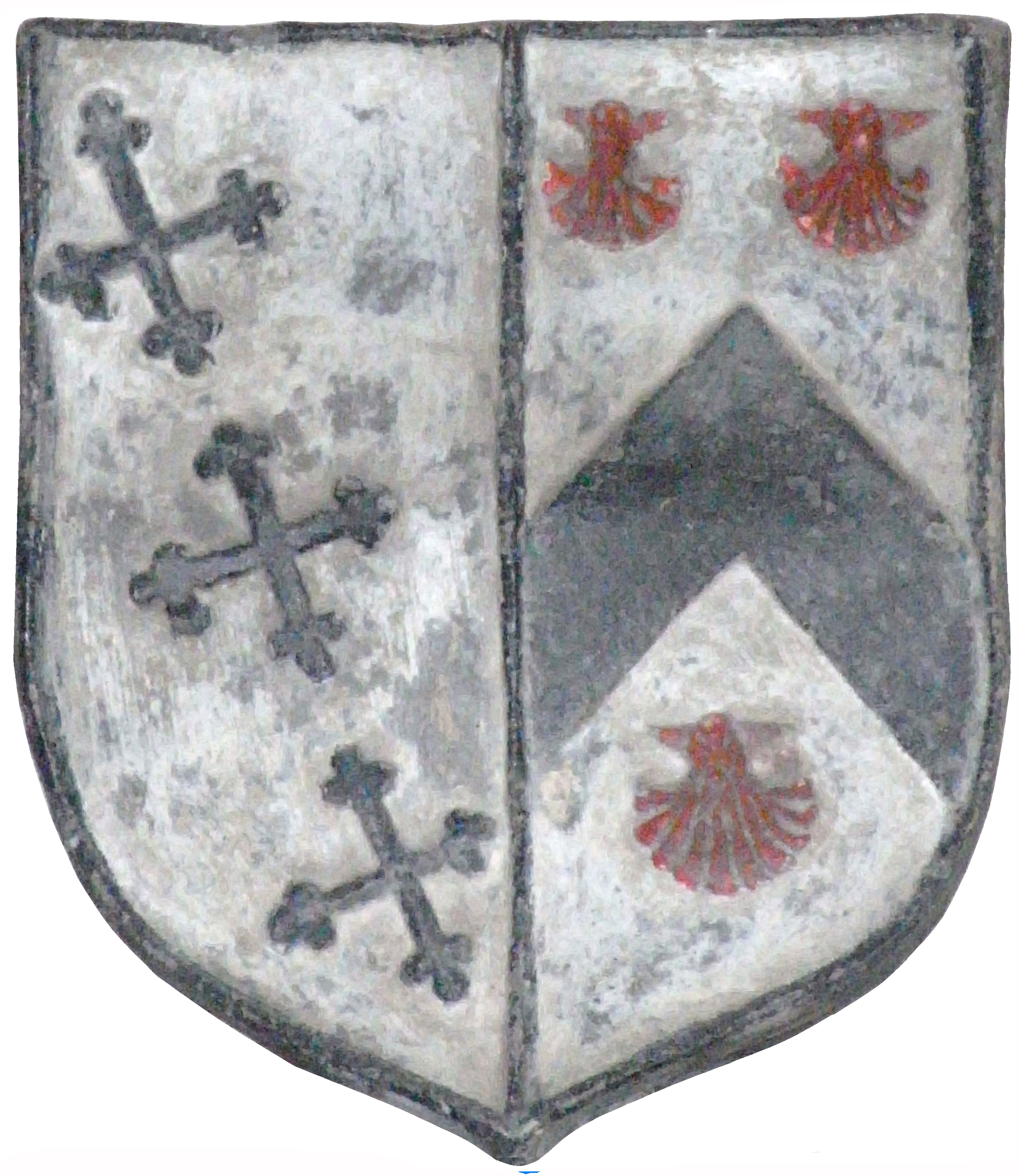
Heraldic escutcheon on monument to John Northcote(1570–1632), Newton St Cyres Church, Devon. The arms are Argent, three crosses-crosslet in bend sable (Northcote) impaling Argent, a chevron sable between three escallops gules (Pollard), representing his second marriage to Susanna Pollard (died 1634)

  - Susanna Pollard, who married in 1596 as his second wife John Northcote (1570–1632), of Hayne, Newton St Cyres, near Crediton, whose splendid monument with standing effigy exists in Newton St Cyres Church. She was the mother of Sir John Northcote, 1st Baronet (1599–1676). A panel on the monument to her husband is dedicated to her memory and contains in the centre a sculpted relief of her head circumscribed by the following two lines of verse:

"My Jacob had by mee
As many sonnes as hee,
Daughters twice three"
Above her portrait is a chronogram in verse:
"See heer In ChrIst sLeeps shee,
FroM paInefVLL Labors free,
Her VVorks henCe foLLoVV on,
To resVrreCtIon"
If the capital letters in red are added together as Roman numerals ("VV" being treated as V + V, and the first letters of each line excluded) the sum of 1634 results, Susanna's date of death. The remaining unused letters are SFHT, the initial letters of each line, of uncertain cryptic meaning. Below the chronogram is a heraldic escutcheon showing the arms of Northcote impaling Pollard: Argent, a chevron sable between three escallops gules. Below her portrait inscribed on a black stone tablet is the following verse:

"Jehovah first compos'd us two in one,
Then made one two, till strong affection
Did reunite us one; Death tried his skill
To part's us againe, but could not worke his will
One was our hope, faith, comfort, one's o(u)r tombe
One place our soule hath, till the day of Dome
Regia pacifisae commisit chartula libram
Justitiae lustris aetatis quinque peractis
Libravit rectum pura cum mente probatus
Stellata camera spectatur ut ignibus aurum"

Monumental brass to Anne Pollard, 2nd wife of James Welshe, St Peter's Church, Barnstaple

  - Anne Pollard, who married on 9 April 1604 at Ashton (as his 2nd wife) to James Welshe (alias Walshe), counsellor-at-law, lord of the manor of Alverdiscott. A small partially destroyed monumental brass inscription to her survives on the wall of the south chancel St Peter's Church, Barnstaple, with the following text: Here lyeth the body of Anne late the wife of James Welshe Esqr and daughter of Sir Hugh Pollard, Knight. She departed...this world to the kingdome of Heaven...seaventeenth day of March A(nn)o MD...Blessed are the dead w(hi)ch dye in the.... On it within a strapwork surround is a heraldic escutcheon showing the arms of Welshe/Walshe (Azure, six mullets or a crescent for difference) impaling Pollard: quarterly 1st & 4th: A chevron between three escallops (Pollard); 2nd & 3rd: A chevron between three mullets (de Via/de Way arms, a common Pollard quartering). Over-all is a crescent for difference, denoting a second son.
  - Gertrude Pollard, who in 1616 married at Newton St Cyres Gilbert Davie (1583–1627) of Canonteign in the parish of Christow, Devon.
  - Margaret Pollard, married firstly a certain Whiddon and secondly in 1609 at Ashton to Robert Dodson of Haye.
- Secondly Sir Hugh Pollard married Elizabeth Speke, a daughter of Sir George Speke (c.1530-1584) of Whitelackington, Somerset, and of Heywood, Wembworthy, Devon, Sheriff of Somerset in 1562–63 and a Member of Parliament for Somerset 1572-83, and widow successively of John Chudleigh and Sir John Clifton. By Elizabeth he had three sons, Arthur, Hugh and Robert.

==== Sir Lewis Pollard, 1st Baronet ====
Sir Lewis Pollard, 1st Baronet (c. 1578 – c. 1645), eldest son and heir. He was created a baronet on 31 May 1627. He married Margaret Berkeley, daughter of Sir Henry Berkeley of Bruton.

==== Sir Hugh Pollard, 2nd Baronet ====
Sir Hugh Pollard, 2nd Baronet (c. 1610 – 1666), eldest son and heir. During the Civil War the Pollards were staunch Royalists but Sir Hugh Pollard was fined £518 for his "delinquency”. It may have been the severity of this fine which caused him to sell the manor to his cousin Sir Arthur Northcote, 2nd Baronet (1628–1688), whose large inscribed slate ledger stone and funeral helm survives in King's Nympton Church, the place of his burial.

=== Northcote ===
The manor remained in the Northcote family until 1740 when it was sold to James Buller (1717–1765) of Morval, Cornwall.

=== Buller ===
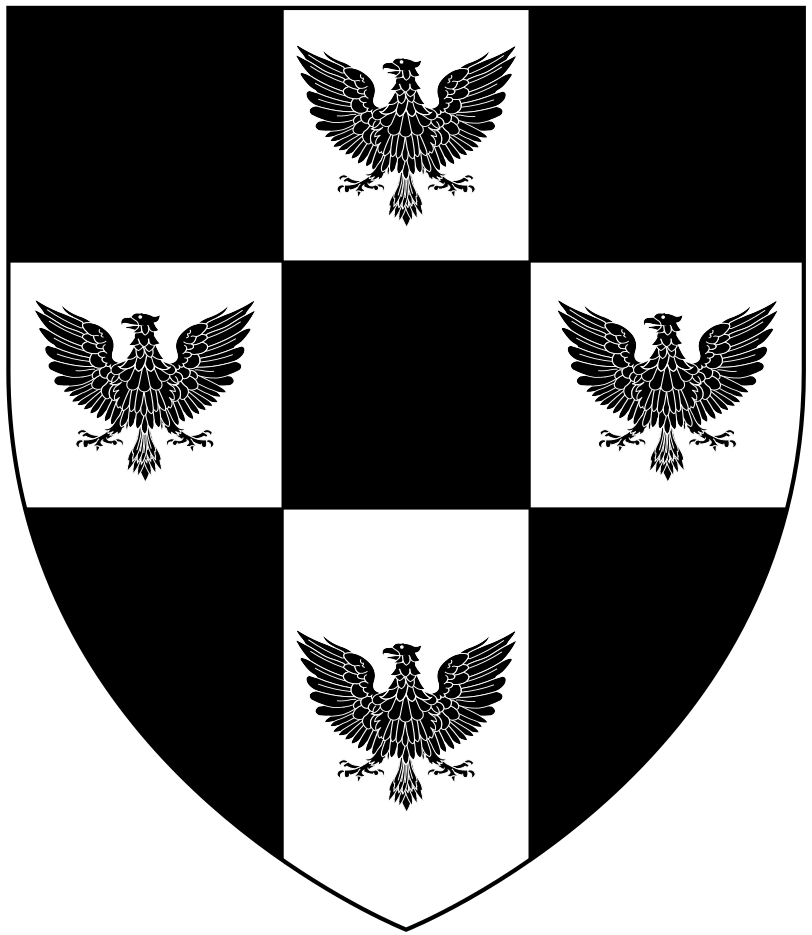
Arms of Buller: Sable, on a cross argent quarter pierced of the field four eagles displayed of the first

James Buller (1717–1765) was MP for East Looe 1741–1747 and for Cornwall 1748–1765. His first wife Elizabeth Gould (died 1742) was the heiress of the estate of Downes near Crediton in Devon, which became at some time the principal seat of the family. He married secondly in 1744 to Hon. Jane Bathurst (died 1794), second daughter of Allen Bathurst, 1st Earl Bathurst, of Cirencester Park, and sister of Henry Bathurst, 2nd Earl Bathurst (1714–1794), Lord Chancellor 1771–1778. It appears she did not wish to live in the house of her husband's first wife, or else had a liking for the new Palladian fashion in architecture, as James built for her a new house at King's Nympton. He demolished the previous mediaeval manor house at King's Nympton and built in its place between 1746–9 the fine Palladian mansion which was then known as "New Place", which survives today known as "King's Nympton Park". His architect was Francis Cartwright of Blandford in Dorset and the design was based on Marble Hill in Twickenham, one of the earliest Palladian houses in England built between 1724–9. In 1756 James Buller donated to the parish church a magnificent set of silver-gilt vessels, being a thanks-offering for the survival of himself, his children and over 80 parishioners after an inoculation against smallpox. The set comprises a chalice, paten, flagon and alms dish. The Bullers eventually withdrew to Downes in about 1839 and in 1842 sold the estate to James Tanner, who added the existing low Tuscan porch.

=== Tanner ===
The Tanner (alias Mortimer) family of yeoman status had been established at Rose Ash and at Creacombe since at the latest the 17th. century. John Davy of Flitton, North Molton, one of the leading pioneers in the breeding of North Devon cattle, married Elizabeth Tanner, and had by her a son John Davy Tanner, living in 1824.

==== James Tanner ====
James Tanner (1783–1868), JP, DL, of King's Nympton Park, was the son of Robert Tanner by his wife Mary Melhuish, daughter of Thomas Melhuish. He was the grandson of Jonathan Tanner of Rose Ash. In 1827 James Tanner of King's Nympton married Elizabeth Vowler, the daughter of John Vowler of Parnacott. James Tanner appears to have held a lease of King's Nympton Park before he purchased the property in 1842, as the Trewman's Exeter Flying Post of Thursday, October 2, 1823 made the following report of his hospitality towards his farm-workers:

On Wednesday last, Mr James Tanner, of King's Nympton, one of the largest agriculturists in the North of Devon, on the completion of his harvest, and according to his annual custom, gave his labourers, amounting to upwards of 100, on the lawn in front of his residence, a good and plentiful repast of true old English Fare - roast beef and plum pudding, with an abundance of beer and cider. The joyous feast presented a most gratifying sight, particularly so when the customary neck was given, after which the merry dance commenced with a good band of music and glee and merriment prevailed; until night spread her sable mantle, and closed the festive scene; the jovial groups before retiring gave 3 hearty cheers to their benevolent employer and sung 'God Save the King'. A party of gentlemen, friends of Mr Tanner, met on the occasion at his hospitable mansion and with Mr Radford's capital pack of harriers enjoyed a good mornings sport; an excellent dinner welcomed them on their return, which met with a warm reception from the hunters and the remainder of the day was spent in mirth and harmony.

James Tanner had the following children by his wife Elizabeth Vowler:

- Rev. John Vowler Tanner (died 1903), eldest son and heir (see below)
- James Melhuish Tanner, who in 1880 married Caroline Buckingham.
- Mary Tanner (died 1917), who married on 22 July 1858, at King's Nympton, Sir Charles Malcolm Kennedy (died 1908), KCMG, CB, of the Foreign Office, eldest son of James Kennedy, Esq., late her Majesty's Judge in the mixed court at Havanna. She left no children.

==== John Vowler Tanner ====
Rev. John Vowler Tanner (died 1903), of King's Nympton Park, eldest son and heir, rector of Chawleigh. In 1871 he married Eliza Thompson (died 1909) elder daughter of Sir Matthew William Thompson, 1st Baronet (1820–1891), of Parkgate, Guiseley, Yorkshire.

==== Charles Peile Tanner ====
Charles Peile Tanner (b. 1873), eldest son, of King's Nympton Park. He was educated at Charterhouse and Pembroke College, Cambridge. He married in 1914 Frances Isabel Atkinson, daughter of William Fletcher Atkinson of Ilkley, Yorkshire.
