= Grilstone, Bishop's Nympton =

Historic estate in north Devon, England

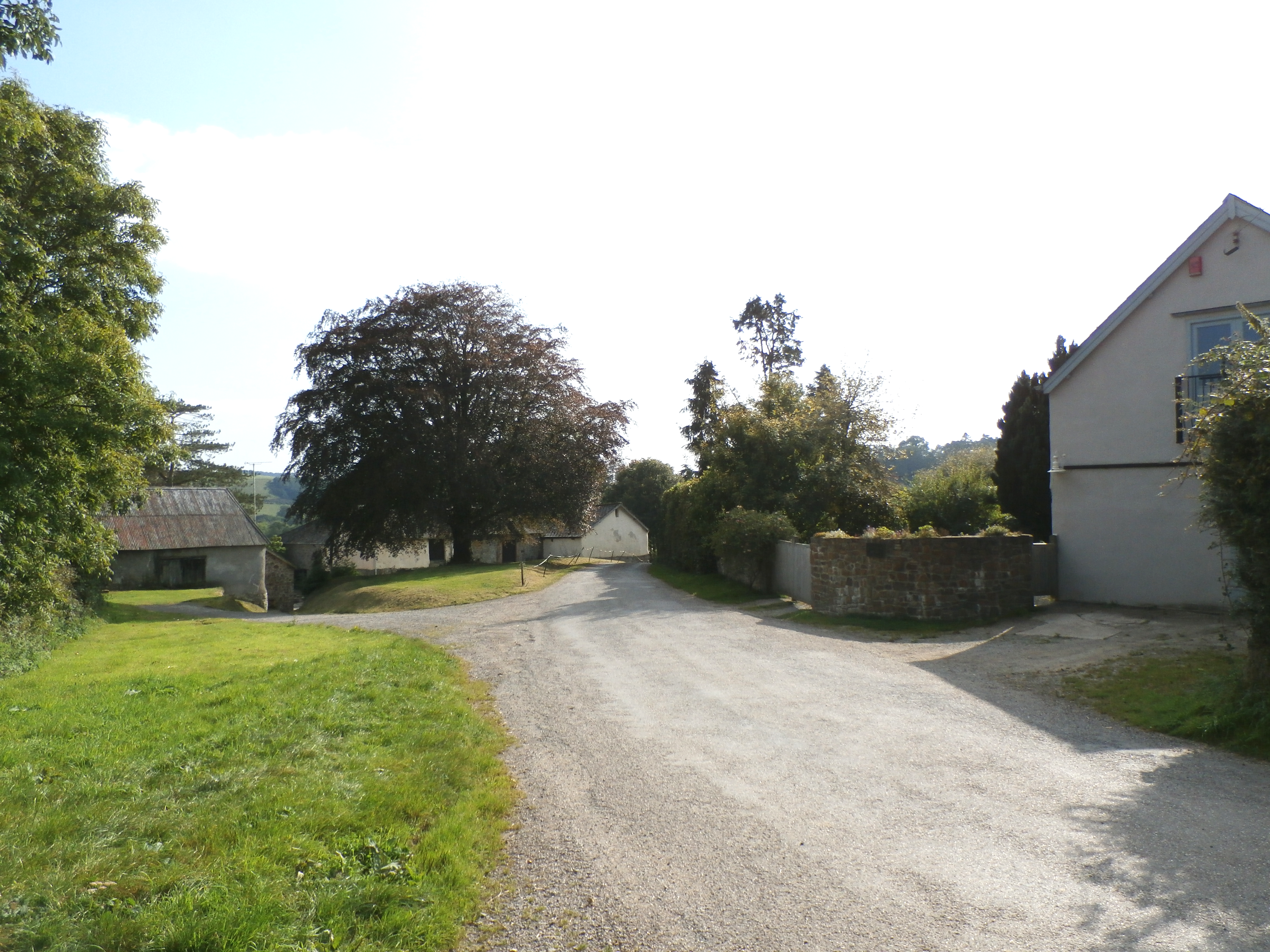
Grilstone, view passing through on the public highway. The main house is on the left.

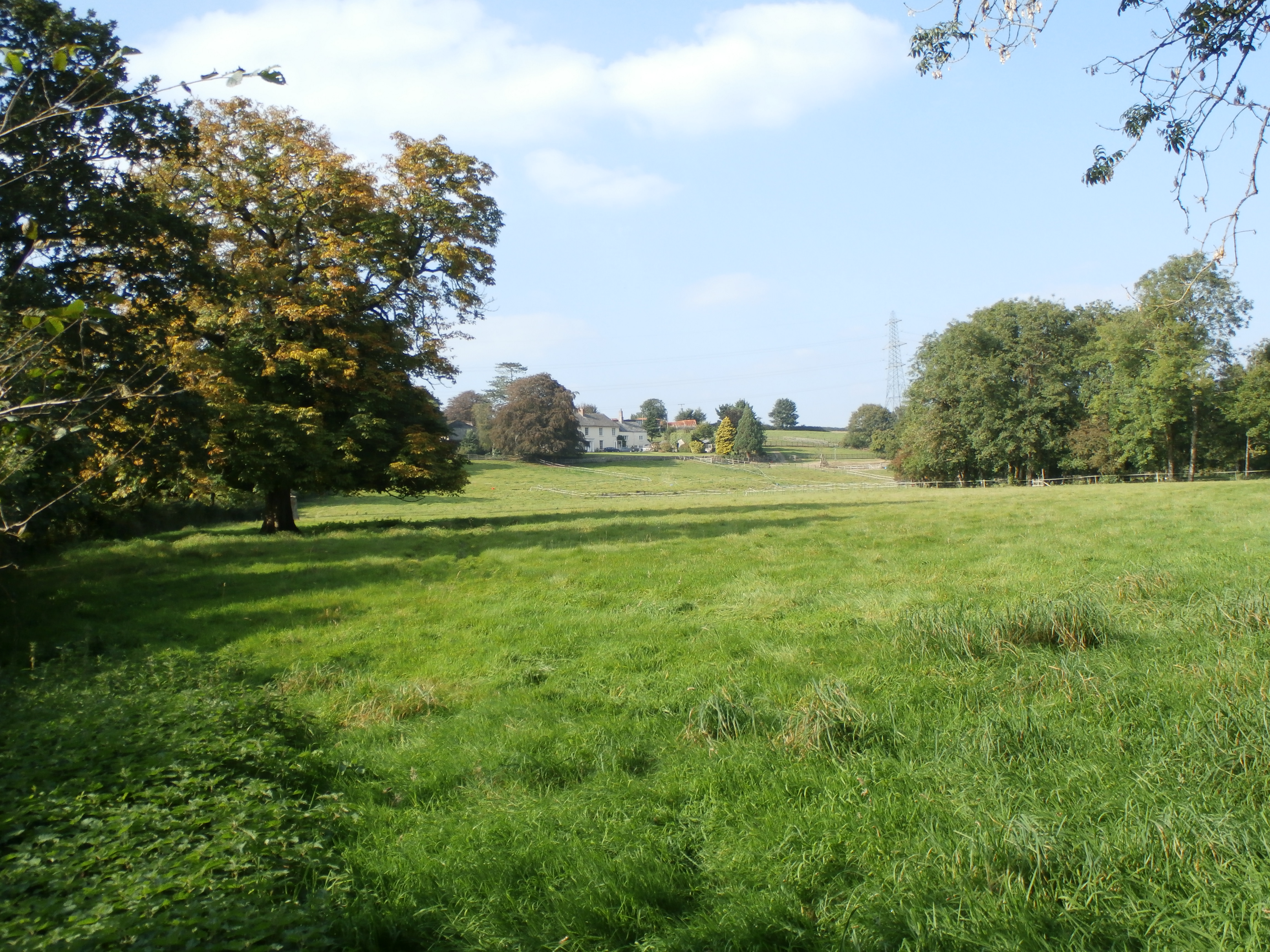
Grilstone, viewed from the valley bottom. The present house is Georgian, but Hoskins (1959) states that some remains of the old house survive.

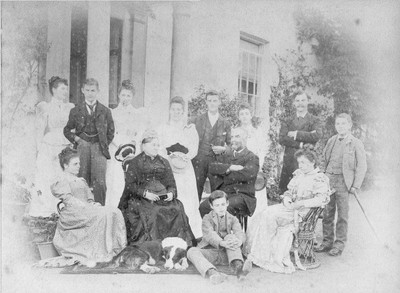
The Passmore family at Grilstone in 1894. The father is Edmund Passmore, his wife Lydia Jutsum, heiress of Grilstone. Bertha Passmore, front row far right, was the mother of John Widgery, 1st Baron Widgery

Grilstone in the parish of Bishop's Nympton in north Devon, England, is an historic estate. The present grade II listed house, situated about 1 1/4 miles south-east of the market town of South Molton, is Georgian, an 1834 extension and remodelling by Rev. William Thorne of an earlier building.

It is best known as the seat of Sir Lewis Pollard (c. 1465 – 1526), Justice of the Common Pleas from 1514 to 1526 and a Member of Parliament for Totnes in 1491.

== History ==
=== de Grilstone ===
The earliest recorded holder of the estate, in the 13th and 14th centuries, was the de Grilstone family, which as was usual took its name from its seat. In 1374 a member of the family obtained from the Bishop of Exeter a licence to have a chapel on the site.

=== Pollard ===
The Pollard family had originated at the manor of Way in the parish of St Giles in the Wood, near Great Torrington, Devon, called by Hoskins (1954) "the fons et origo (Note: "Fount and origin") of the mighty tribe of Pollard". The present house is a grade II listed building.

Sir Lewis Pollard (died 1526) later moved to King's Nympton where he purchased the manor which remained the seat of his descendants, the Pollard baronets, until it was sold by Sir Hugh Pollard, 2nd Baronet (1603–1666). On his death without a son the baronetcy passed to his younger brother Sir Amyas Pollard, 3rd Baronet (1616–1701), of Abbots Bickington, Devon, who died unmarried and without legitimate male heir, when the baronetcy became extinct.

=== Jutsum ===
The Jutsum family lived at Grilstone in the 19th century, where Frederick Jutsum kept a well-regarded herd of Red Devon Cattle.

=== Passmore ===
The Passmore family inherited Grilstone, on the marriage of Edmund Passmore to Lydia Jutsum, heiress of Grilstone. Bertha Passmore was the mother of the judge John Widgery, 1st Baron Widgery (1911–1981), Lord Chief Justice of England and Wales (1971–80), whose father's family was from South Molton.

=== James ===
Grilstone Farm served as the home of John James MBE, up until his death in 2012. John notably was the founder of Mole Valley Farmers, and also served as the Chairman of the co-operative for a substantial period of time. In addition to his time at MVF, John also spent time in Africa as a Field Director for Band Aid, for which he was awarded his MBE.
