= Hugh Stucley =

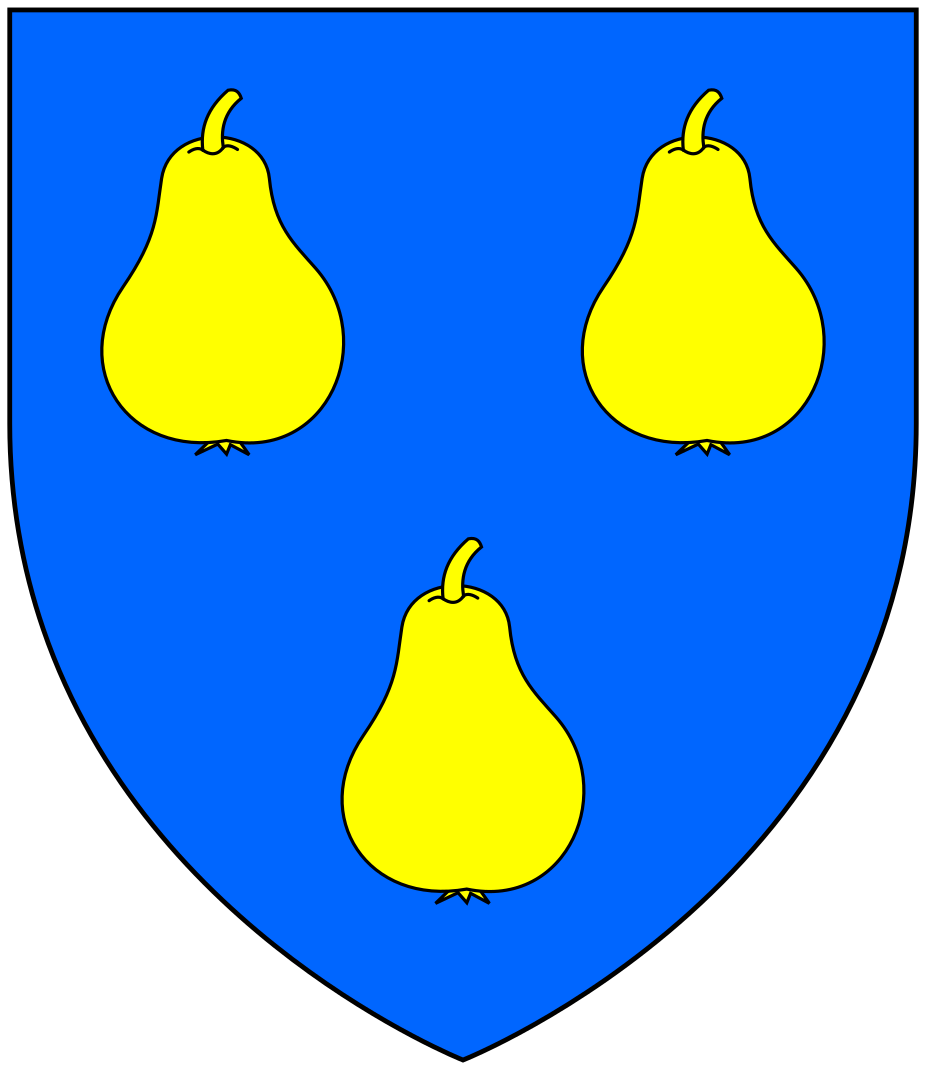
Arms of Stucley: Azure, three pears pendant or Motto: Bellement et Hardiment ("beautifully and bravely")

Sir Hugh Stucley (1496–1559) was the lord of Affeton in Devon, and Sheriff of Devon in 1545. His third son was Thomas Stukley (c. 1520 – 1578), known as "The Lusty Stucley".

== Origins ==
He was the eldest son and heir of Sir Thomas Stucley (1473–1542) of Affeton, Sheriff of Devon in 1521, by his wife Anne Wode (alias Wood), daughter and heiress of Sir Thomas Wode (died 1502), of Childrey in Berkshire (now in Oxfordshire), Lord Chief Justice of the Common Pleas from 1500 and in 1478 elected a Member of Parliament for Wallingford.

== Marriage and children ==
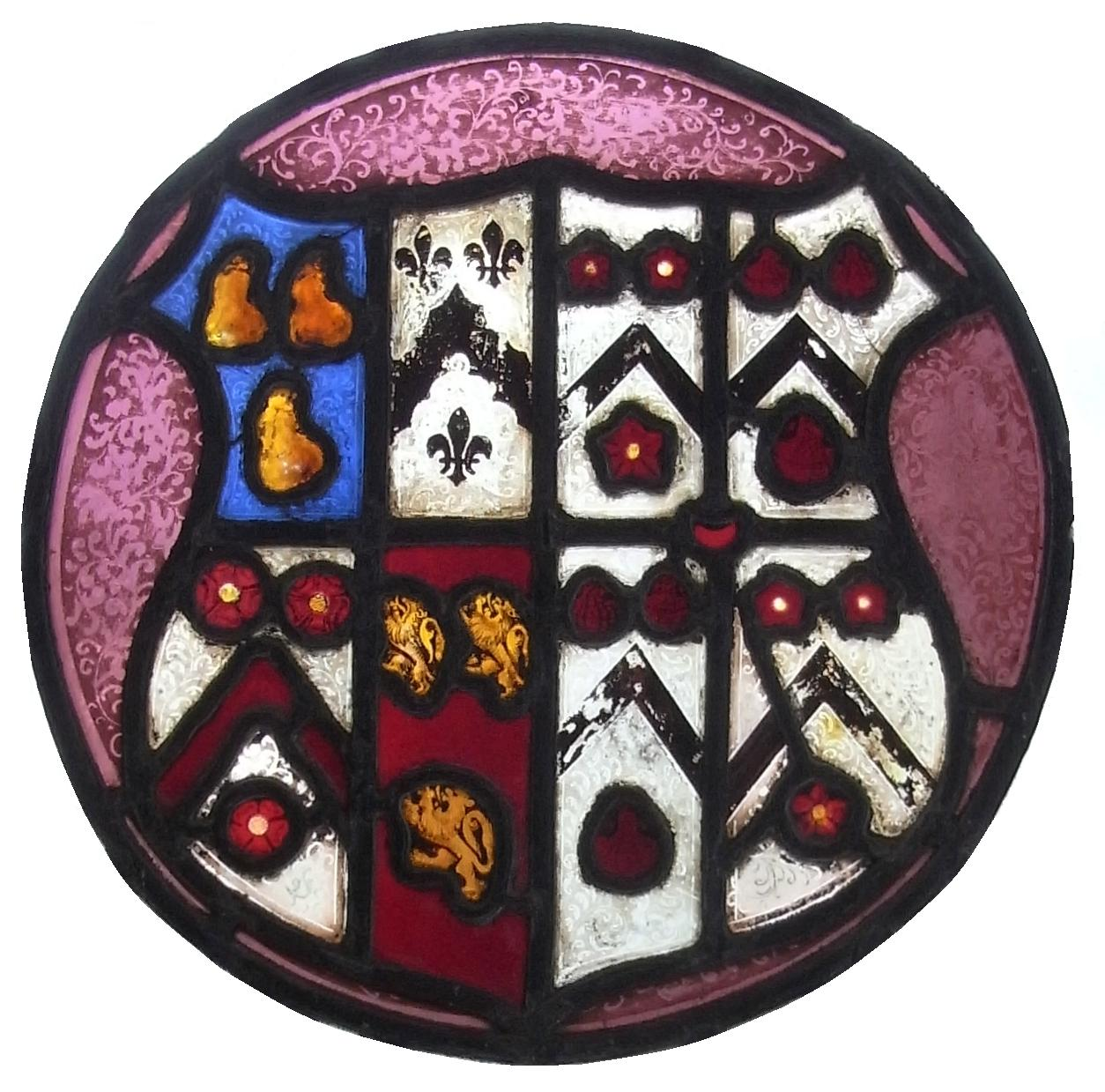
Heraldic stained-glass roundel representing the marriage of Stucley and his wife Jane Pollard, in King's Nympton Church

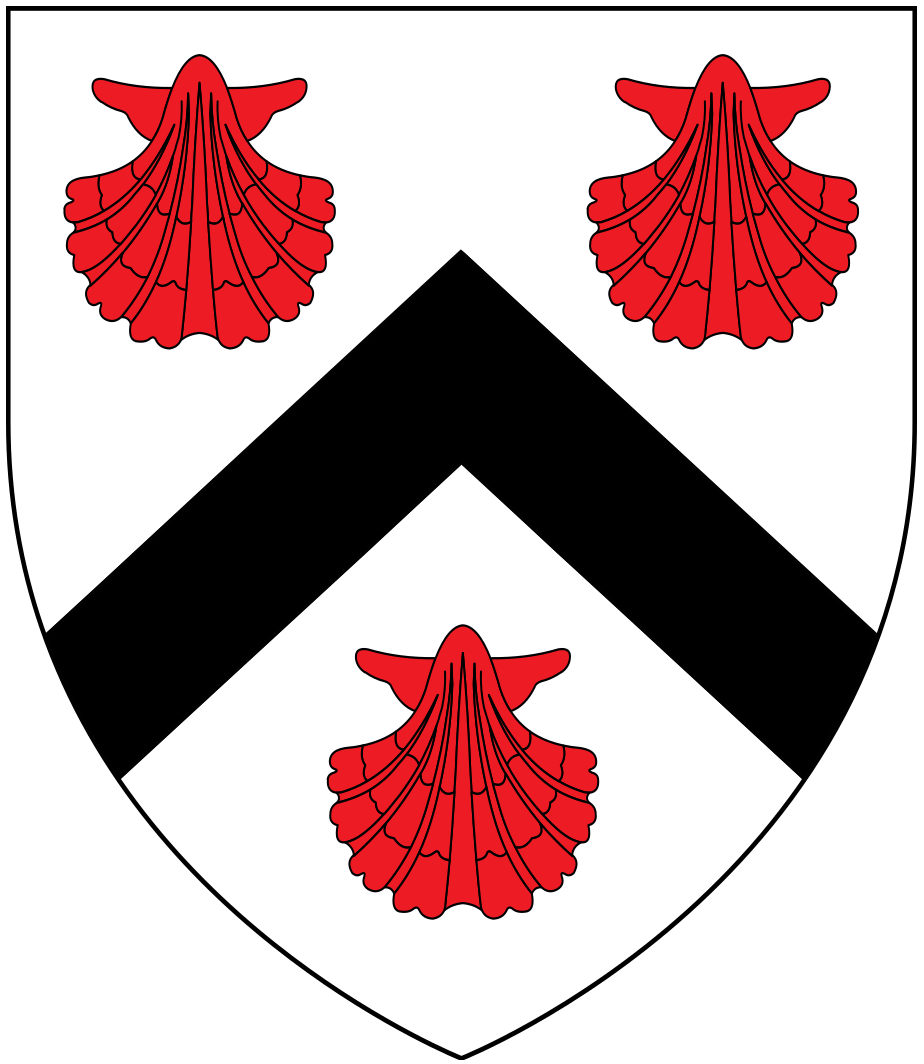
Arms of Pollard: Argent, a chevron sable between three escallops gules

Stucley married Jane (Note: Erroneously named as Phillippa in Vivian, 1895, p.598, pedigree of Pollard, given corrected on p.721, pedigree of Stucley) Pollard, second daughter of Sir Lewis Pollard (c. 1465 – 1526), lord of the Manor of King's Nympton in Devon, Justice of the Common Pleas from 1514 to 1526, and Member of Parliament for Totnes, Devon, in 1491. Jane's brother was the influential Sir Richard Pollard (1505–1542), MP, of Putney, Surrey, who was an assistant of Thomas Cromwell in administering the surrender of religious houses following the Dissolution of the Monasteries and who in 1537 was granted by King Henry VIII the manor of Combe Martin in Devon, and in 1540 Forde Abbey. An heraldic stained-glass roundel survives in the south window of the Pollard Chapel in the south aisle of King's Nympton Church showing the arms of Stucley impaling Pollard, with quarterings of each family. (Note: The arms are as follows: baron, quarterly 1st: Azure, three pears pendant or (Stucley); 2nd: Argent, a chevron engrailed between three fleurs-de-lis sable (de Affeton); 3rd: Argent, a chevron gules between three roses of the second seeded or (Manningford?); 4th: Gules, three lions rampant or (FitzRoger); femme quarterly 1st & 4th: Argent, a chevron sable between three mullets gules pierced or (de Via/Way of Way, St Giles in the Wood); 2nd & 3rd: Argent, a chevron sable between three escallops gules (Pollard).)

By his wife he had five sons and five daughters.

=== Sons ===
- Lewes Stucley (1529–1581), eldest son and heir, Standard Bearer to Queen Elizabeth I. He married twice: firstly to Anne Hill, daughter of Sir Giles Hill and widow of Christopher Hadley; secondly to Janet Powlett, daughter of ".... Powlett of Dorset".
- George Stucley, second son.
- Thomas Stukley (c. 1520 – 1578) "The Lusty Stucley", third son, a mercenary who fought in France, Ireland and in the naval Battle of Lepanto (1571) in the Gulf of Corinth, Greece, and was killed at the Battle of Alcazar (1578) fighting the Moors. It was alleged that he was an illegitimate son of King Henry VIII. He was a Roman Catholic recusant and a rebel against the Protestant Queen Elizabeth I. He married a daughter of "Powlett".
- Hugh Stucley, fourth son, of North Beckland in the parish of Hartland, Devon.
- Amias Stucley, fifth son, who married Frances/Francisca Pollard, daughter of Sir Richard Pollard of Way, St Giles in the Wood, Devon, (the senior and original line of the Pollard family and first cousin twice removed of Sir Lewis Pollard of Bishop's Nympton) by his wife Joane Bampfield, a daughter of Sir Edward Bampfield (died 1528) of Poltimore in Devon.

=== Daughters ===
- Anne Stucley, who married William Bellew (1512–1578) of Ash in the parish of Braunton, Devon and of Alverdiscott in Devon, descended from the Bellews of Bellewstown, County Meath in Ireland. William's great-grandfather John Bellew had married Anne Fleming, one of the two daughters and co-heiresses of John Fleming of Bratton Fleming and Ash. The Fleming family was one of the most ancient in North Devon. Anne Stucley's eldest son was Richard Bellew of Ash, whose marriage to Margaret St Leger (daughter of Sir John St. Leger (died 1596), of Annery, MP and Sheriff of Devon) was commemorated by the erection in the private chapel at Ash of an elaborate heraldic mural monument, now in St Brannoc's Church, Braunton, which includes a shield showing the arms of Stucley with eight quarterings. (Note: See File:BellewMonumentBrauntonDevon.PNG for a photo and details.)
- Mary Stucley, who married twice. Firstly to Tristram Larder (1515–1547) lord of the manor of Upton Pyne, whose mother was Isabella Bonville, daughter of John Bonville (died 1491) of Combe Raleigh in Devon, the "spurious son" of the magnate William Bonville, 1st Baron Bonville (1391–1461) the step-brother of Hugh Stucley (died before 1457). Her second marriage was to John Prideaux (1520–1558), of Nutwell, in the parish of Woodbury, Devon, which estate he purchased. He was MP for Devon in 1554 and a Serjeant-at-law. A monument thought to date from the late 16th century survives in Woodbury Church showing on a tomb chest two recumbent figures said to be of a Prideaux and his wife.
- Awdrie Stucley, who married twice. Firstly in 1546 to William Yeo, son of Hugh Yeo 1485 - 1548 of Fayrelynche, Braunton, Devon, and Alice his wife His great-grandfather was William Yeo of Heanton Satchville, Petrockstowe in Devon, a substantial landowner and the eventual heir of whose line was the Rolle family. Her second marriage was in 1563 (as the first of his three wives) to Roger Giffard (1533–1603) of Tiverton Castle, in Devon. The elaborate mural monument of Roger Giffard survives in the chancel of St Peter's Church, Tiverton, displaying the arms of Stucley, inscribed in Latin. (Note: The inscription is still plainly visible on the monument and was quoted in 1789 by Sir Egerton Brydges in "The Topographer".)
- Agnes Stucley, who married John Giles (died 1606) of Bowden, in the parish of Ashprington, Devon, who purchased the adjoining estate of Sharpham from Edward Drewe.
- Katherine Stucley, who married John Carew of Bickleigh in Devon, without children.

== Sources ==
- Hoskins, W.G., A New Survey of England: Devon, London, 1959.
- Pole, Sir William (died 1635), Collections Towards a Description of the County of Devon, Sir John-William de la Pole (ed.), London, 1791.
- Risdon, Tristram (d.1640), Survey of Devon, 1811 edition, London, 1811, with 1810 Additions
- Vivian, Lt.Col. J.L., (Ed.) The Visitations of the County of Devon: Comprising the Heralds' Visitations of 1531, 1564 & 1620, Exeter, 1895.
