= Hugh Pollard (sheriff) =

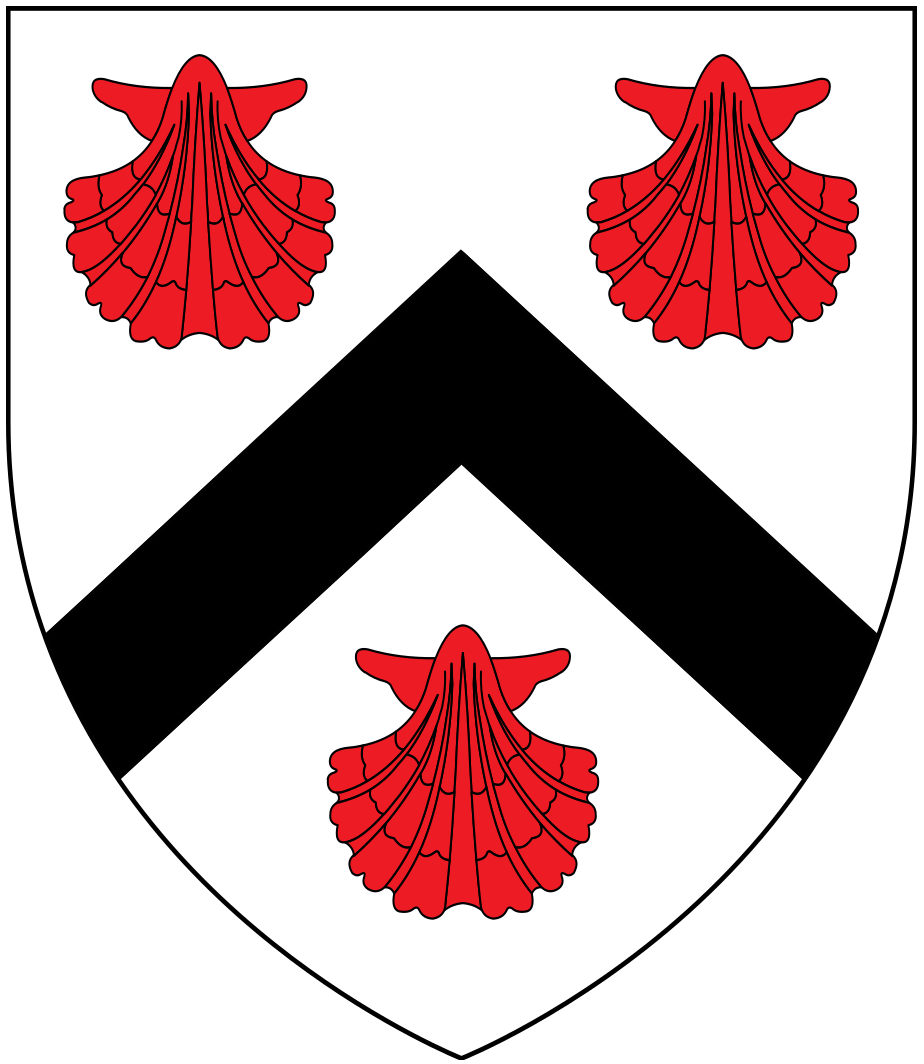
Arms of Pollard of King's Nympton: Argent, a chevron sable between three escallops gules

Sir Hugh Pollard (fl. 1536, 1545) lord of the manor of King's Nympton in Devon, was Sheriff of Devon in 1535/6 and in 1545 was appointed Recorder of Barnstaple in Devon.

== Origins ==
He was the eldest son and heir of Sir Lewis Pollard (c.1465–1526) of King's Nympton, a Justice of the Common Pleas from 1514 to 1526 and Member of Parliament for Totnes in 1491. Hugh's mother was Agnes Hext, daughter of Thomas Hext, a prominent lawyer of Kingston in the parish of Staverton, near Totnes, by his wife Florence Bonville. Westcote stated her to be the heiress of Dunisford (or Donesford). The Pollard family were first established in Devon before the 13th century at the manor of Way in the parish of St Giles in the Wood, near Great Torrington.

=== Brother ===
Hugh's younger brother was the more prominent Sir Richard Pollard (1505–1542), MP for Taunton (1536) and for Devon (1539, 1542), of Putney, Surrey, King's Remembrancer of the Exchequer and a law reporter, who was an assistant of Thomas Cromwell in administering the surrender of religious houses following the Dissolution of the Monasteries. In 1537 Thomas was granted by King Henry VIII the manor of Combe Martin in Devon and in 1540 Forde Abbey.

== Career ==
He was Recorder of Barnstaple in 1545, to which honorary officer the Borough of Barnstaple entrusted the nominations of its two Member of Parliament. One of the MP's he nominated was George Rolle (d.1552), a London lawyer, who in 1523 had been appointed by an act of Parliament, the Keeper of Common Bench Records (Tenure of Office) Act 1523 (14 & 15 Hen. 8. c. 35), as life tenant of the office of "Keeper of the Writs and Rolls of the Court of Common Pleas", due to his "long good and perfect knowledge and experience" of the functioning of that Court. Rolle was thus an associate of Sir Hugh's father, Sir Lewis Pollard, one of the Judges of the Common Pleas. It was in the small Devonshire parish of St Giles in the Wood, the ancestral home of the Pollards, where Rolle purchased his seat of Stevenstone, which eventually at the start of the 20th century became the caput of "the largest estate Devon had ever seen", today managed by the Clinton Devon Estates company.

Through the influence of his younger brother Sir Richard Pollard he obtained the wardship of Richard Bury (1516–1543), son and heir of John Bury (d.1533) lord of the manor of Colleton in the parish of Chulmleigh, Devon, whom he married to his daughter Elizabeth Pollard. Richard Pollard obtained as his own wife John Bury's daughter Jacquetta, as promised him in her father's will.

In 1539 Hugh Pollard acquired a 21-year lease of the site and demesne of Torre Abbey at the Dissolution of the Monasteries, and in 1543 acquired the freehold from John St. Leger (d.1596) of Annery.

== Marriage and children ==
He married twice:

- Firstly to Elizabeth Valletort, daughter and heiress of John Valletort of Clyst St Lawrence, by whom he had three sons and one daughter:
  - Sir Lewis Pollard, eldest son and heir, whose grandson was Sir Lewis Pollard, 1st Baronet (c.1578-c.1645).
  - Richard Pollard
  - John Pollard
  - Elizabeth Pollard, married firstly Richard Bury (1516–1543) lord of the manor of Colleton, Chulmleigh, whose wardship and marriage had been purchased by her father, with the helpful influence of his brother Richard Pollard, the government official. Richard Pollard managed at the same time to persuade Richard Bury's father John IV Bury (1481–1533) to give him for his own wife his daughter Jacquetta Bury. Secondly Elizabeth Pollard married Henry Dillon (d.1579) of Chimwell, Bratton Fleming, lord of the manor of Bratton Fleming, whose sister Dorothy Dillon was the wife of Elizabeth's cousin Hugh Pollard of Knowstone.
- Secondly he married Dorothy Carew, daughter of Sir Edmund Carew (1465–1513) of Mohuns Ottery in the parish of Luppitt, Devon, (killed in 1513 at the Siege of Thérouanne, in Artois, part of the Battle of the Spurs or Battle of Guinegate) and widow of John Stowell, by whom he had a further daughter Dorothy Pollard (d.1559/60), the first of three wives of Robert Courtenay (d. 1583), lord of the manor of Molland in Devon.
