= Sir Hugh Pollard, 2nd Baronet =

English soldier

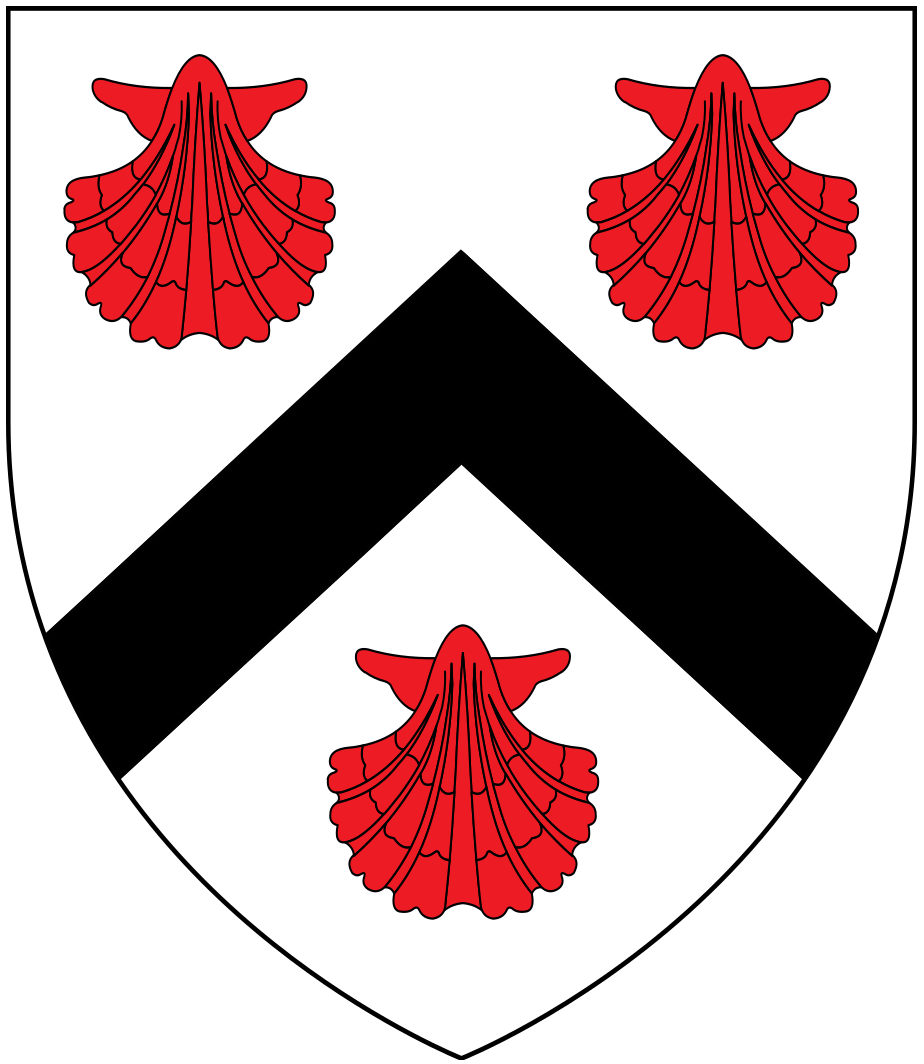
Arms of Pollard of King's Nympton: Argent, a chevron sable between three escallops gules

Sir Hugh Pollard, 2nd Baronet (1603 – 27 November 1666) was an English soldier and MP elected for Bere Alston in 1640, Callington in 1660, and Devon in 1661. He supported the Royalist cause in the English Civil War.

== Origins ==
Pollard was the eldest son and heir of Sir Lewis Pollard, 1st Baronet (d.1641) of King's Nympton, Devonshire, by his wife Margaret Berkeley, daughter of Sir Henry Berkeley, Knight, of Bruton, Somerset.

== Career ==
He joined the army and by 1639 was a captain engaged in raising troops in Devon for the Scottish wars. The following year he was ordered to Scotland and was probably present at the Battle of Newburn.

=== Civil War ===
In November 1640, Pollard was elected Member of Parliament for Bere Alston in the Long Parliament. He became involved in the Royalist army plots of 1641 and, after being found guilty of misprision, was expelled from the House of Commons. He succeeded to the baronetcy that same year.

During the Civil war Pollard mainly served with the king's army in Devonshire and Cornwall and, in 1645, was made governor of Dartmouth. Fairfax's Parliamentary troops besieged the town in January 1645/46 and Pollard was captured and held prisoner until 1646.

In 1653, he was fined £518 for his "delinquency". It may have been the severity of this fine which caused him to sell to his cousin Sir Arthur Northcote, 2nd Baronet (1628–1688) the manor of King's Nympton in Devon, purchased as his seat by his great-great-great grandfather Sir Lewis Pollard (c. 1465-1526), of Grilstone, Bishop's Nympton, Justice of the Common Pleas and MP for Totnes.

=== Restoration ===
After the Restoration of the monarchy in 1660 Pollard was elected MP for the Cornish seat and Rolle family pocket borough of Callington in a by-election to the Convention Parliament. No doubt this was due to the Rolle influence exerted by Pollard's second wife Mary Stevens (d. 1669), widow of Henry Rolle (1605-1647) of Stevenstone. He was appointed a JP, a Deputy Lieutenant, and Vice Admiral of Devon. In 1661, he was elected MP for Devon in the Cavalier Parliament, with as his co-MP Sir John Rolle (d. 1706), KB, cousin and heir of Henry Rolle (d. 1647). He was appointed in 1661 Governor of Guernsey and in 1662 Comptroller of the Royal Household and a Privy Councillor.

== Marriages and children ==
Pollard married twice:

- Firstly to Lady Bridget de Vere (1584-1631), a daughter of Edward de Vere, 17th Earl of Oxford (1550-1604) and widow of Francis Norris, 1st Earl of Berkshire (1579-1622). By her he left an only daughter, Bridget Pollard.
- Secondly to Mary Stevens (1619-1669), a daughter of William Stevens (d.1648) of Great Torrington, and widow of Henry Rolle (1605-1647) of Beam near Great Torrington who inherited in 1638 the vast estate of Stevenstone near Great Torrington. William Stevens was the founder of the Devon branch of the influential Stevens family of Vielstone in the parish of Buckland Brewer, of Cross in Little Torrington and of Winscott in Peters Marland. The Cornish seat of Callington was controlled by the Rolle family and it must have been due to the influence of his second wife Mary Stevens that Pollard was elected to that seat in 1660. Mary Stevens was buried at St Giles in the Wood, the parish church of Stevenstone.

== Death and burial ==
Pollard died on 27 November 1666 at Whitehall at the age of about 63 and was buried in Westminster Abbey.

== Succession ==
On his death without male progeny the baronetcy passed to his younger brother Sir Amyas Pollard, 3rd Baronet (1616-1701), of Abbots Bickington, Devon. Due to the debts built up by Sir Hugh, largely from his lavish entertaining, much apparently on government business, his brother inherited very little of the ancient family estate and almost immediately had to sell the family manor of King's Nympton. Upon the death of Sir Amyas unmarried and without legitimate male heir, the baronetcy became extinct.

== Sources ==
- Helms, M. W., & Ferris, John. P., biography of Sir Hugh Pollard published in History of Parliament: House of Commons 1660-1690, ed. B.D. Henning, 1983
- Wolffe, Mary, biography of Sir Hugh Pollard published in Oxford Dictionary of National Biography
- Vivian, Lt.Col. J.L., (Ed.) The Visitations of the County of Devon: Comprising the Heralds' Visitations of 1531, 1564 & 1620, Exeter, 1895, pp. 597–599, Pollard pedigree, p. 598 Sir Hugh Pollard, 2nd Bt

Parliament of England
Preceded by	Member of Parliament for Bere Alston; 1640–1641	Succeeded by
Preceded by Robert Rolle; John Coryton	Member of Parliament for Callington; 1660; With: John Coryton	Succeeded by Sir Henry Bennet; Sir Cyril Wyche
Preceded by Sir Edward Seymour, Bt; Sir John Northcote, Bt	Member of Parliament for Devon; 1661–1667; With: Sir John Rolle	Succeeded by Earl of Torrington; Sir John Rolle
Baronetage of England
Preceded by Lewis Pollard	Baronet (of King's Nympton) c.1645–1666	Succeeded by Amyas Pollard
