= George Speke =

George Speke may refer to:

- George Speke (politician, died 1689) (1623–1689), English politician, member of parliament (MP) for Somerset
- George Speke (politician, died 1584) (c. 1530–1584), English politician, MP for Somerset
- George Speke (politician, died 1753) (c. 1686–1753), British politician, MP for Milborne Port, for Taunton, and for Wells
- Sir George Speke, 2nd Baronet (1653–1683), English politician, MP for Bath, and for Chippenham
