= Richard Pollard (MP) =

16th-century English politician

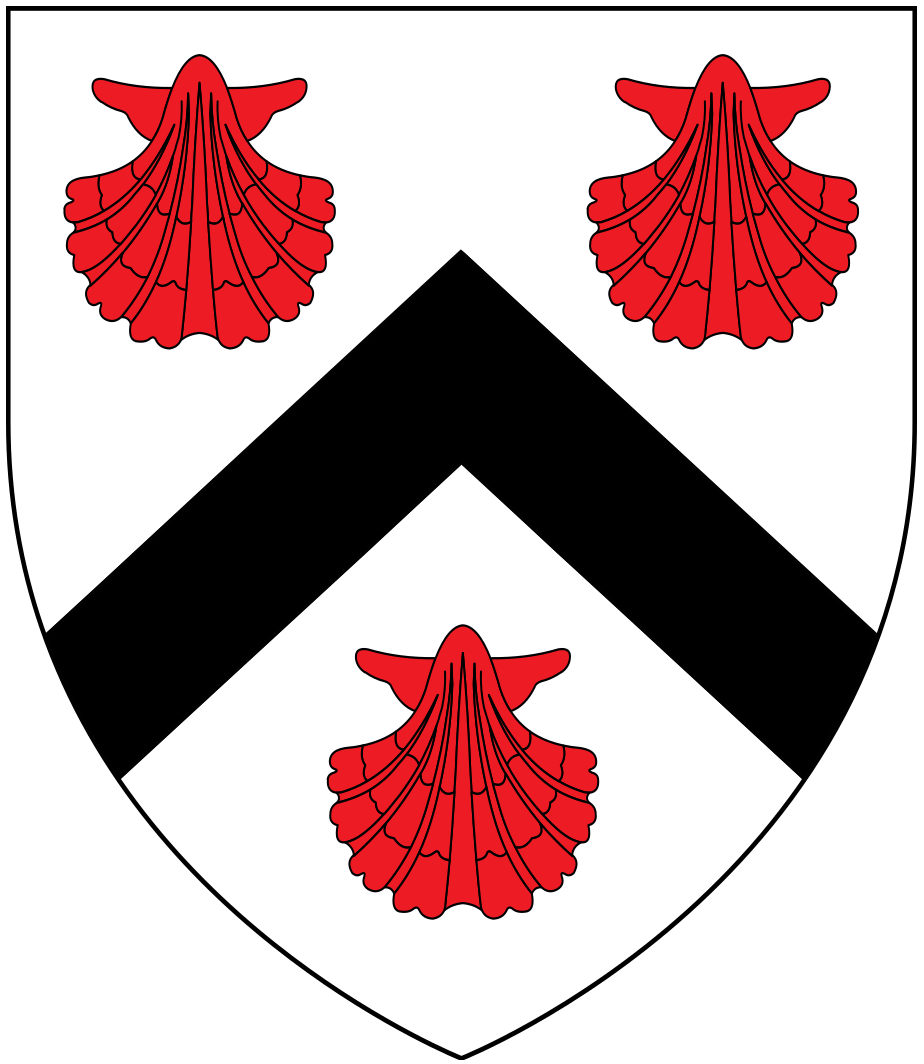
Arms of Pollard of King's Nympton: Argent, a chevron sable between three escallops gules

Sir Richard Pollard (by 1505 – 10 November 1542), was Member of Parliament for Taunton in 1536, and for Devon in 1540 and 1542. He played a major role in assisting Thomas Cromwell in administering the Dissolution of the monasteries.

== Origins ==
He was the second son of Sir Lewis Pollard (c. 1465-1526) of King's Nympton, in North Devon, Justice of the Common Pleas from 1514 to 1526 and MP for Totnes in 1491, by his wife Agnes Hext, daughter of Thomas Hext, a prominent lawyer of Kingston in the parish of Staverton, near Totnes.

== Career ==
In 1519 Richard Pollard entered on his legal training in the Middle Temple, where his father had also trained. He was a JP for Devon in 1532, and was elected MP for Taunton in 1536 and twice for Devon in 1539 and 1542 and was Sheriff of Devon in 1537-8. By 1537 he had been appointed King's Remembrancer of the Exchequer and a law reporter. Also by 1537 he had been appointed General Surveyor of the Court of Augmentations. He was thus an assistant of Thomas Cromwell in administering the surrender of religious houses following the Dissolution of the monasteries, and was employed particularly as a surveyor who visited the premises and made a detailed valuation of the house's assets and income, the Valor Ecclesiasticus, as a preliminary to their sale. He was thus a highly influential person and was able to perform many favours for his friends. He helped, for example, Arthur Plantagenet, 1st Viscount Lisle, whose wife Honor Grenville was from North Devon, to secure advantageous terms in his purchase of Frithelstock Priory, in which action he was assisted by his fellow influential North Devonian lawyer George Rolle. He is known to have been loaned by Honor Grenville her manor house at Umberleigh where he lodged his family in the summer of 1538.

Frequent references to his activities are recorded in the Lisle Letters and in the Letters & Papers of Henry VIII. One of his most notorious acts was his supervision of the destruction and pillaging of the shrine to Saint Thomas Becket in Canterbury Cathedral in September 1538, which on account of the quantity of gold and precious stones within it took several days to complete. The spoil of the shrine was stated by Stow in his Annales to have "filled two great chests such as six or seven strong men could do no more than convey one of them at once out of the church". Following this operation Pollard proceeded to Reading and Winchester to effect similar destruction with Thomas Wriothesley and John Wiliams. He wrote that a shrine at Winchester contained no gold and only counterfeit stones but they had recovered a quantity of silver. They intended next to dismantle the altar.

He resided sometime at Putney, Surrey. In 1539, he was appointed to the Council of the West, and was knighted on 16 January 1542.

== Lands acquired ==
In 1537 he was granted by King Henry VIII the manor of Combe Martin in Devon. His influential position within the Court of Augmentations enabled him to acquire cheap bargains from the possessions of the dissolved religious houses. In 1540 he purchased Forde Abbey and in 1538 he acquired on favourable terms a 99-year lease (later reduced to 21 years) of Marsh Priory, formerly a possession of Plympton Priory in Devon. His technique was similar to that used by George Rolle (by whom he was enlisted to help Lord Lisle) in that he used his local knowledge to buy land which had a ready and profitable resale market when split into smaller lots, often being sold to the former tenants.

== Marriage ==
He married Jacquetta Bury (d.1545, buried at Berrynarbor), as promised him in the will of her father John Bury (d.1533) of Colleton, Chulmleigh, Devon. By his influence Richard had helped his elder brother Sir Hugh I Pollard (fl.1535,1545) (Sheriff of Devon in 1535/6 and Recorder of Barnstaple in 1545) to obtain the wardship of John Bury's 17-year-old son and heir Richard Bury, whom Sir Hugh married to his daughter Elizabeth Pollard.
