= Sir Amyas Pollard, 3rd Baronet =

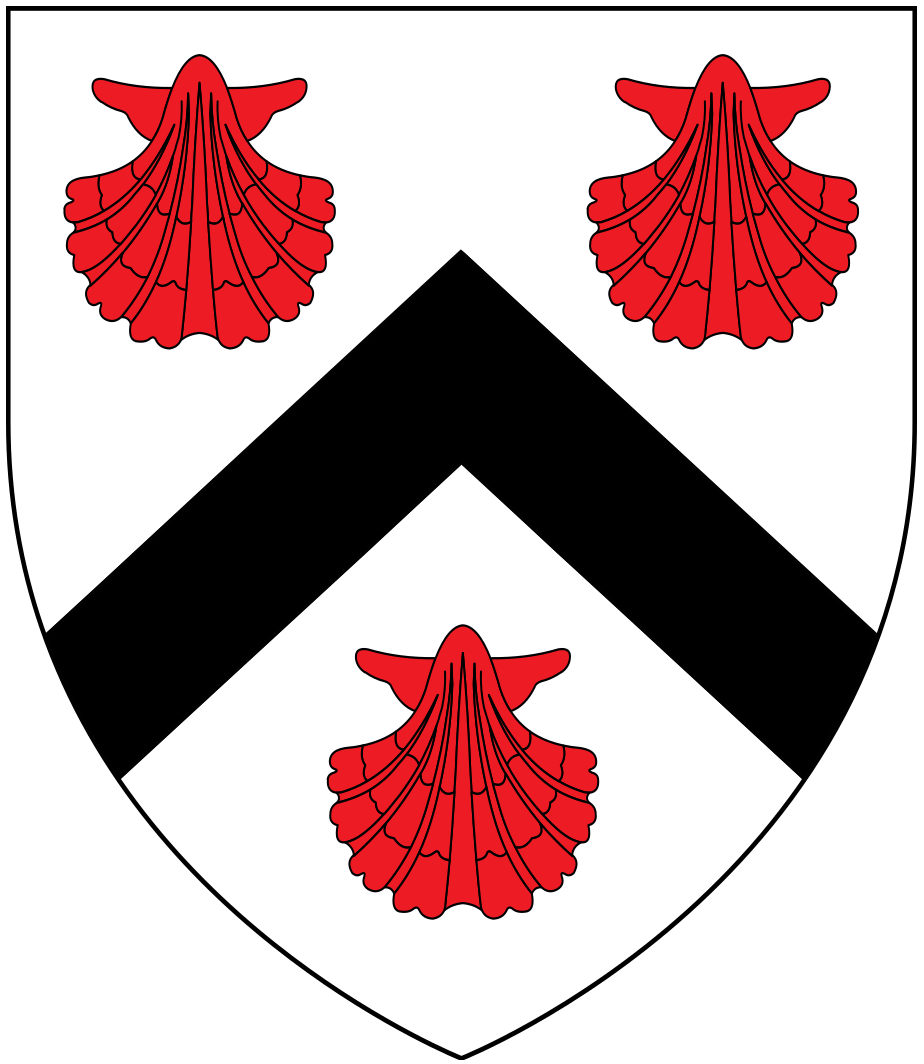
Arms of Pollard of King's Nympton: Argent, a chevron sable between three escallops gules

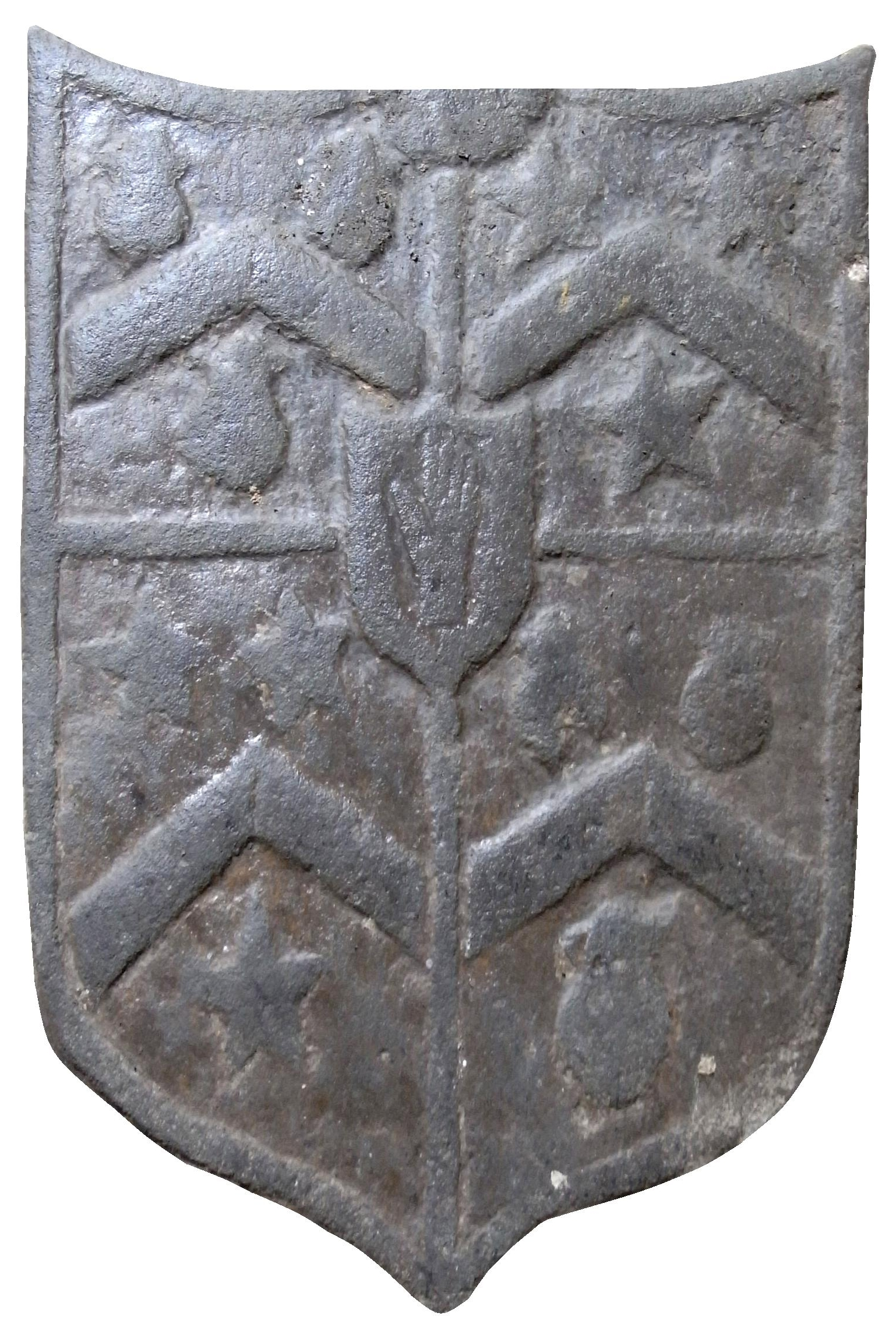
Heraldic escutcheon bearing arms of Sir Amyas Pollard, 3rd Baronet (1616–1701): Quarterly 1st & 4th, a chevron between three escallops; 2nd & 3rd: a chevron between three mullets; overall the Red Hand of Ulster. Detail from his ledger stone in Abbots Bickington Church, Devon

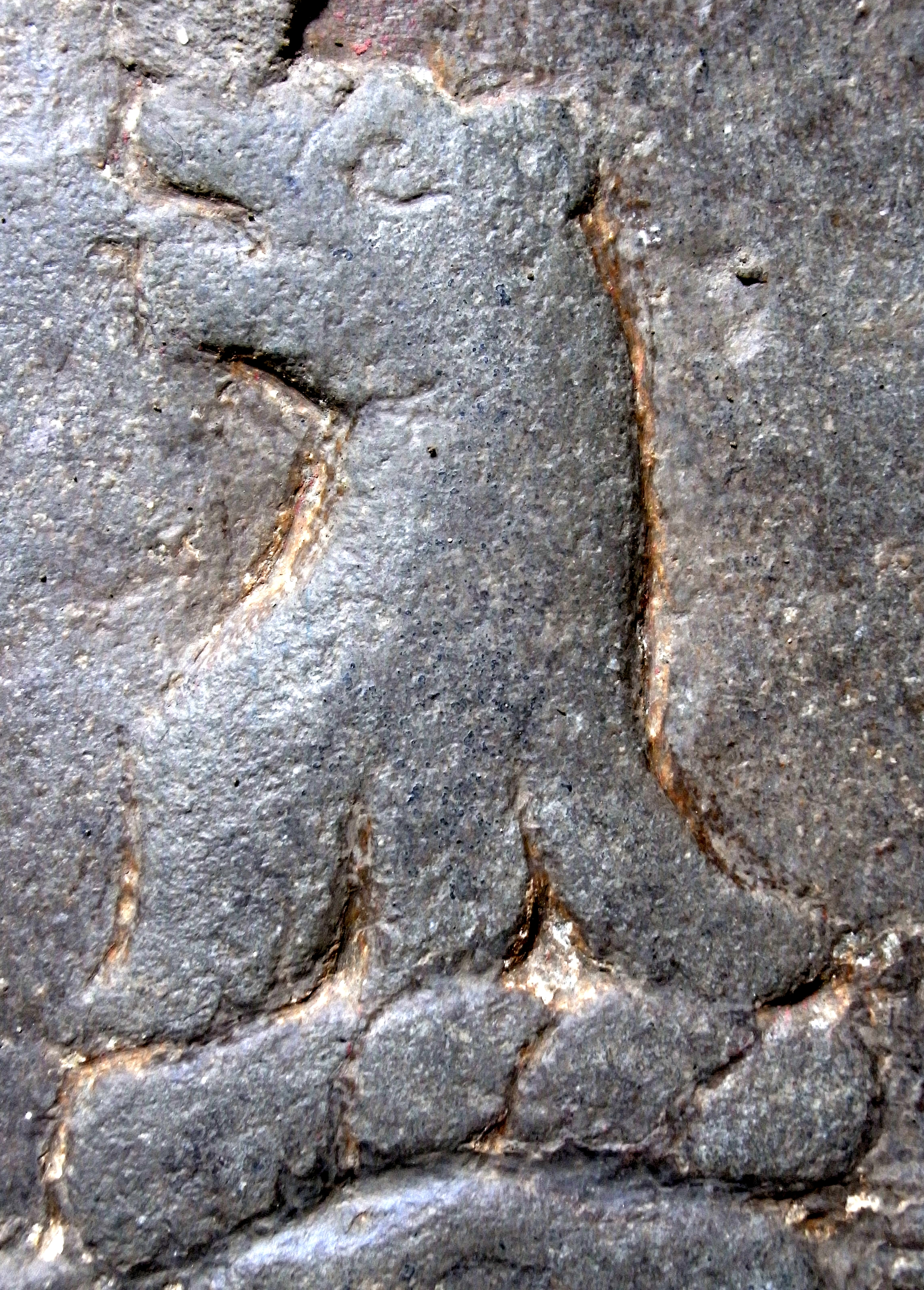
Crest of Sir Amyas Pollard, 3rd Baronet (1616–1701), detail from his ledger stone in Abbots Bickington Church, Devon: A leopard's head and neck erased

Sir Amyas Pollard, 3rd Baronet (1616–1701) was an English gentleman of Devon and a baronet. Little is known of his life except that he was a staunch royalist during the Civil War, as evidenced by the inscribed verse on his ledger stone at Abbots Bickington:

Who durst the King & royall cause still own, In times when doing it was so dangerous known

He was the last in the male line of the ancient Pollard family of Bishop's Nympton. He inherited the baronetcy from his elder brother Sir Hugh Pollard, 2nd Baronet, who left the Pollard estates much reduced and encumbered with debts. He was forced soon after his inheritance to sell the manor of Bishop's Nympton and moved to Abbots Bickington, a smaller family manor, and made his seat at Court Barton, immediately to the south of the small parish church.

== Origins ==
Pollard was the fourth son of Sir Lewis Pollard, 1st Baronet of King's Nympton, Devonshire, by his wife Margaret Berkeley, daughter of Sir Henry Berkeley, Knight, of Bruton, Somerset.

== Illegitimate progeny ==
Pollard never married but left an illegitimate son by an unknown mistress, Thomas Pollard (1681–1710), of Abbots Bickington, who inherited his father's name and estate but not his baronetcy. He married on 25 June 1702 at Sutcombe to Sarah Prideaux, a daughter of Jonathan Prideaux of Theuborough, but the marriage was without progeny. A prominent mural monument erected by his wife exists in the church of Abbots Bickington to the memory of Thomas Pollard.

=== Monument to son ===
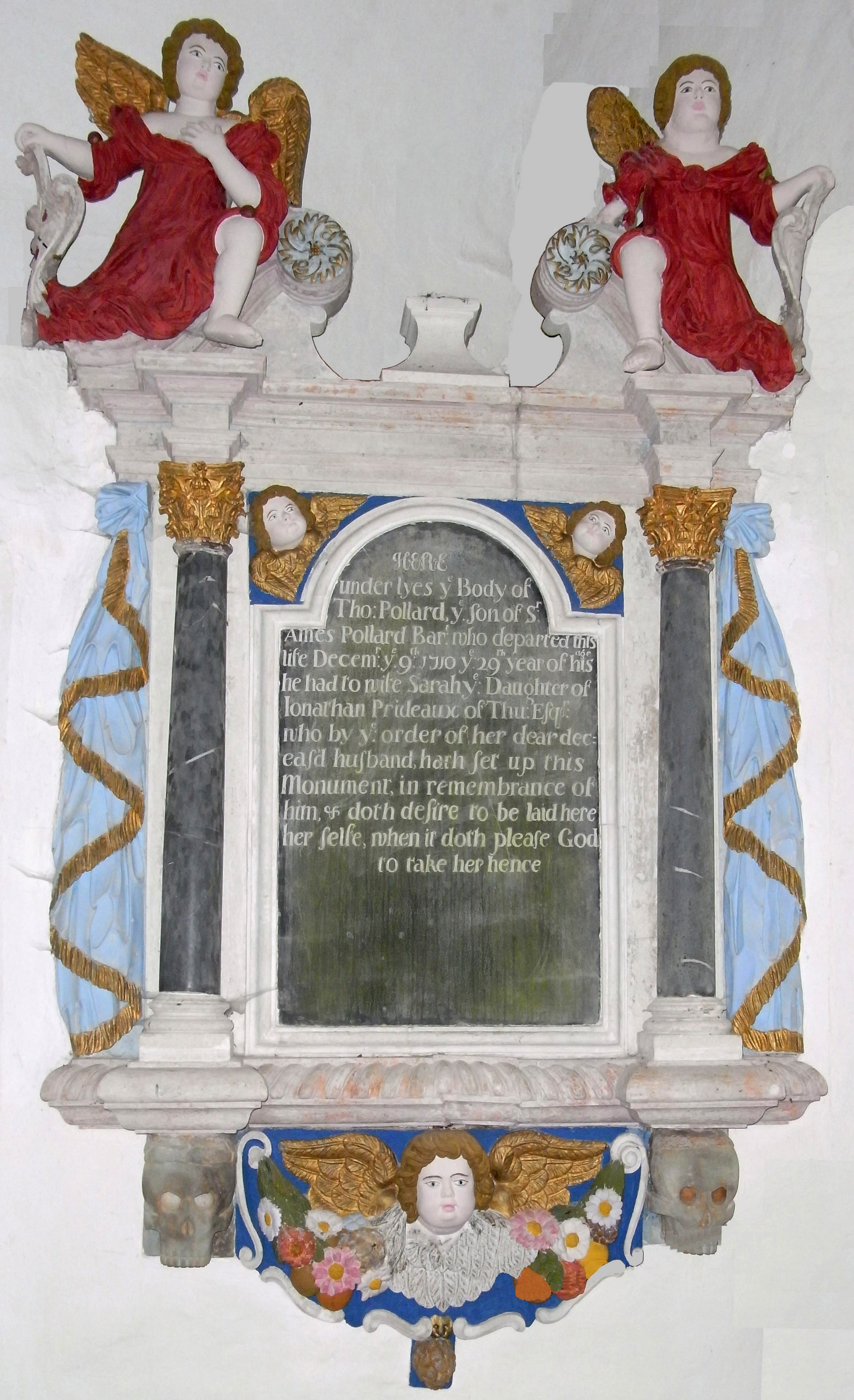
Mural monument to Thomas Pollard (1681–1710), natural son of Sir Amyas Pollard, 3rd Baronet, Abbots Bickington Church, Devon, NE corner of chancel

A newly re-painted mural monument exists to Thomas Pollard (1681–1710), in Abbots Bickington Church, Devon. On a rectangular panel with arched top between two Corinthian columns and below a broken classical pediment is the following inscription:

Here under lyes ye body of Tho: Pollard ye son of Sr. Ames Pollard Bart. who departed this life Decem(be)r ye 9th 1710 ye 29th year of his age. He had to wife Sarah ye daughter of Jonathan Prideaux of Thu(borough) Esqr. who by ye order of her dear deceas'd husband hath set up this monument in remembrance of him & doth desire to be laid here her selfe when it doth please God to take her hence.

Above on either side is an angel holding an escutcheon, on the dexter one of which has recently been re-painted the escallop arms of Pollard. On top between the two angels was formerly a shield showing the quarterings as sculpted in relief on the ledger stone of his father before the altar in the same church. Below the base in the centre is the head and shoulders of a winged putto on a garland of flowers with a skull on each side beneath the columns.

== Death and burial ==
Pollard died in 1701 and was buried before the altar in the very small parish church of Abbots Bickington, where survives his ledger stone inscribed with verse and decorated with heraldry.

== Ledger stone ==
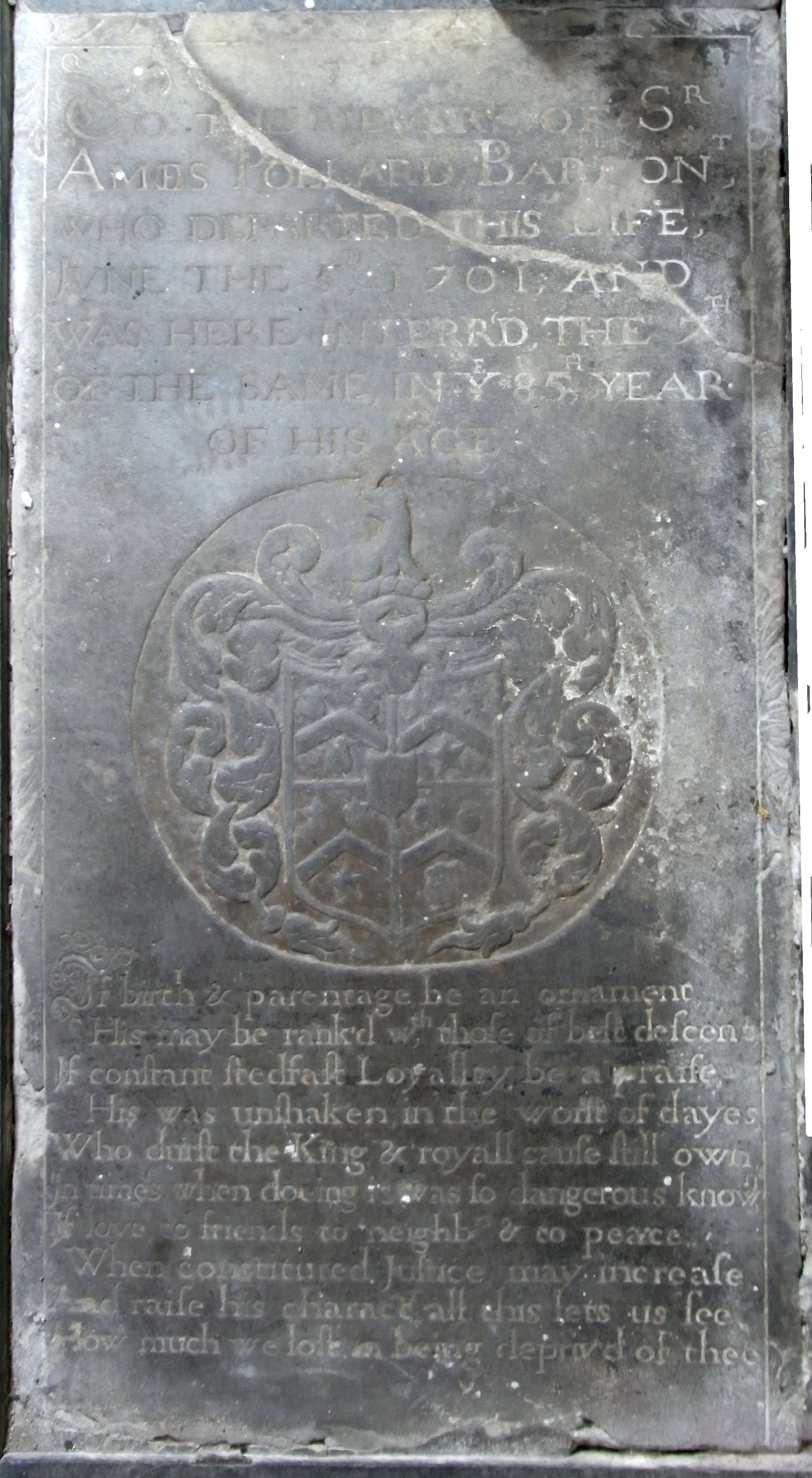
Ledger stone of Sir Amyas Pollard (1616–1701), 3rd Baronet, before the altar in Abbots Bickington Church, Devon

The ledger stone of Sir Amyas Pollard (1616–1701), 3rd Baronet, survives before the altar in Abbots Bickington Church, Devon, inscribed as follows:

To the memory of Sr. Ames Pollard, Barron(e)t, who departed this life June the 5th 1701 and was here interr'd the 7th of the same in ye 85th year of his age.

Below is an heraldic achievement of Pollard showing an escutcheon of the Pollard arms: Quarterly 1st & 4th, a chevron between three escallops; 2nd & 3rd: a chevron between three mullets; overall the Red Hand of Ulster. Above the escutcheon is the crest of Pollard: A leopard's head and neck erased. Beneath is the following verse:

If birth & parentage be an ornament,
His may be rank'd w(i)th those of best descent,
If constant stedfast loyallty be a praise,
His was unshaken in the worst of dayes,
Who durst the King & royall cause still own,
In times when doing it was so dangerous known,
If love to friends to neighb(ou)rs & to peace,
When constituted justice may increase,
And raise his charact(e)r all this lets us see,
How much we lost in being depriv'd of thee.

== Sources ==
- Vivian, Lt.Col. J.L., (Ed.) The Visitations of the County of Devon: Comprising the Heralds' Visitations of 1531, 1564 & 1620, Exeter, 1895, pp. 597–599, Pollard pedigree, p. 598 Sir Hugh Pollard, 2nd Bt

Baronetage of England
Preceded by Hugh Pollard	Baronet (of King's Nympton); 1666–1701	Extinct
