= George Speke (politician, died 1584) =

Member of the Parliament of England

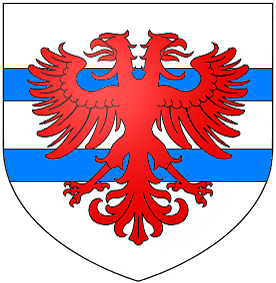
Speke arms: Argent, two bars azure over all an eagle with two heads displayed gules. The Speke canting crest is: A porcupine proper (French: porc-é(s)pic, ("spiky-pig"))

Sir George Speke (c.1530-1584) of Whitelackington in Somerset was Sheriff of Somerset in 1562–63 and was member of parliament for Somerset 1572–83.

== Origins ==
He was the eldest son and heir of Sir Thomas Speke (1507–1551) of Whitelackington, MP for Somerset in 1545, twice Sheriff of Somerset and Dorset in 1540 and 1550, and a Gentleman of the Privy Chamber to King Edward VI. His mother (his father's 1st wife) was Alice Berkeley, daughter of Richard Berkeley and sister of Sir Maurice Berkeley.

== Career ==
He succeeded his father in 1551 and was knighted in 1559. He was a justice of the peace for Somerset from 1559 and was appointed High Sheriff of Somerset for 1562–63. He was elected a Member of Parliament for Somerset in 1572.

== Marriages and children ==
He married twice:

- Firstly to Elizabeth Luttrell, widow of Richard Mallet of Currypool, the daughter of Sir Andrew Luttrell (1484–1538), feudal baron of Dunster, of Dunster Castle in Somerset, Sheriff of Somerset and Dorset in 1528 by his wife Margaret Wyndham (d.1580), a daughter of Sir Thomas Wyndham (d.1521) of Felbrigg Hall, Norfolk, by his first wife Eleanor Scrope, daughter and heiress of Richard Scrope of Upsall Castle, Yorkshire. By Elizabeth he had a son and two daughters:
  - Sir George Speke (d.1637), of Whitelackington, eldest son and heir, who married Phillippa Rosewell, a daughter of William Rosewell, Solicitor General, and sister of William Rosewell of Forde Abbey.
  - Barbara Speke, wife of William Thornhill of Thornhill.
  - Anne Speke, wife of Sir George Trenchard of Wolverton.
- Secondly he married Dorothy Gilbert (d.1589), a daughter of Edward Gilbert of London, by whom he also had a son and two daughters:
  - Hugh Speke (born 1567), who married Elizabeth Beche, daughter and heiress of Henry Beche of Hartley Court, Berkshire.
  - Dorothy Speke, wife of Sir Edward Gorges of Charlton.
  - Elizabeth Speke, wife firstly of John Chudleigh (1565–1589) of Ashton, Devon, and mother of Sir George Chudleigh, 1st Baronet (c.1578-1658); secondly to Sir John Clifton; thirdly (as his 2nd wife) to Sir Hugh II Pollard of King's Nympton, Devon, father (by his 1st wife) of Sir Lewis Pollard, 1st Baronet (c.1578–c.1645).

== Death and succession ==
He was succeeded by his eldest son Sir George Speke, of Whitelackington, who married Phillippa Rosewell, daughter of William Rosewell, Solicitor General.

== Sources ==
- Burke's Genealogical and Heraldic History of the Landed Gentry, 15th Edition, ed. Pirie-Gordon, H., London, 1937, pp. 2103–4, pedigree of Speke of Jordans
