= Pollard baronets =

Title in the Baronetage of England

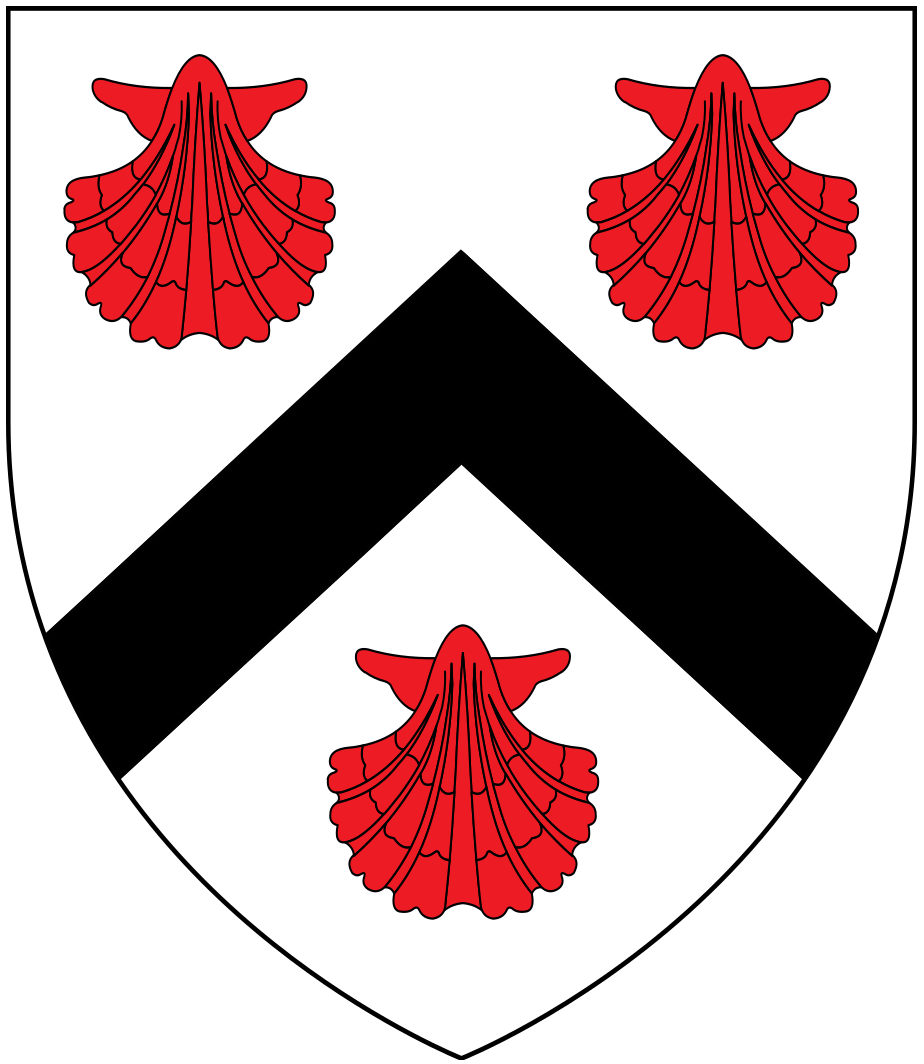
Arms of Pollard of King's Nympton: Argent, a chevron sable between three escallops gules

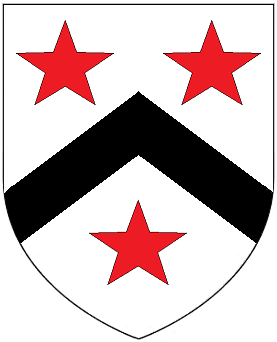
Arms of de Way and Davie of Creedy in the parish of Sandford, Devon, frequently quartered by the Pollard family: Argent, a chevron sable between three mullets gules. The family of Davie is said by Swete to have derived from the family of de Way (Latinised to de Via, of which "Davie" is said to be a corrupted form) of the manor of Way in the parish of St Giles in the Wood, near Great Torrington, Devon. The family of Pollard inherited (or purchased) the manor of Way, which became their fons et origo, and according to Prince, (died 1723) adopted these "de Way"/Davie arms which thenceforth they used either alone or quartered by their own arms of Argent, a chevron sable between three escallops gules. The Pollard family inherited the manor of Horwood from the Cornu family and these de Way/Pollard mullet arms are visible on their own on several 17th-century Pollard monuments in Horwood Church. These arms are also shown pierced

The Pollard Baronetcy, of King's Nympton in the County of Devon, was a title in the Baronetage of England. It was created on 31 May 1627 for Lewis Pollard. The second Baronet sat as Member of Parliament for Bere Alston, Callington and Devon. The title became extinct on the death of the third Baronet in 1701.

== Origins ==
The Pollard family was earlier established at the manor of Way, two miles SE of St Giles in the Wood, in which parish it is situated. It is now represented by the farmhouse known as Way Barton. Reset into the front wall of the house are the stone heads c. 1300 of two ladies wearing wimples and the smaller head of a man. A monumental brass exists in St Giles Church of Eleanor Pollard (died 1430), of which only the lower half of a female figure has survived, with the inscription: Hic jacet Alyanora Pollard qui fuit uxor Johannis Pollard et fila Johannis Coplestone qui obiit 21.o (unus et vicensimo) die mensis Septembris Anno domini Millensimo MMMMXXX cuius animae propitietur Deus Amen. ("Here lies Eleanor / Alianore Pollard who was the wife of John Pollard and daughter of John Copleston who died on the 21st day of the month of September in the One thousandth four hundredth and thirtieth year of Our Lord of whose soul may God look upon with favour Amen".) John de Coplestone was of Colebroke, Devon and married Katherine de Graas, by whom he had Eleanor. There are two further inscriptions on the same slab made at later times to commemorate later family members. The manor of Way passed later by marriage to the family of Risdon, and was the birthplace of the antiquarian Tristram Risdon. The family of Pollard was also established at Horwood, on the site of the present farmhouse known as East Barton. In the Church of St Michael in Horwood is an alabaster effigy of a lady, c. 1450, believed to represent Elizabeth Pollard (died 1430). The Pollard Baronets were descended from Sir Lewis Pollard (c. 1465 – 1526), Justice of the Common Pleas, who purchased the manor of King's Nympton.

== Pollard baronets, of King's Nympton (1627) ==
- Sir Lewis Pollard, 1st Baronet (c. 1578–c. 1645)
- Sir Hugh Pollard, 2nd Baronet (c. 1610–1666)
- Sir Amyas Pollard, 3rd Baronet (c. 1617–1701)

== Sources ==
- Leigh Rayment's list of baronets – Baronetcies beginning with "P" (part 2)
