= Lewis Pollard =

Member of the Parliament of England

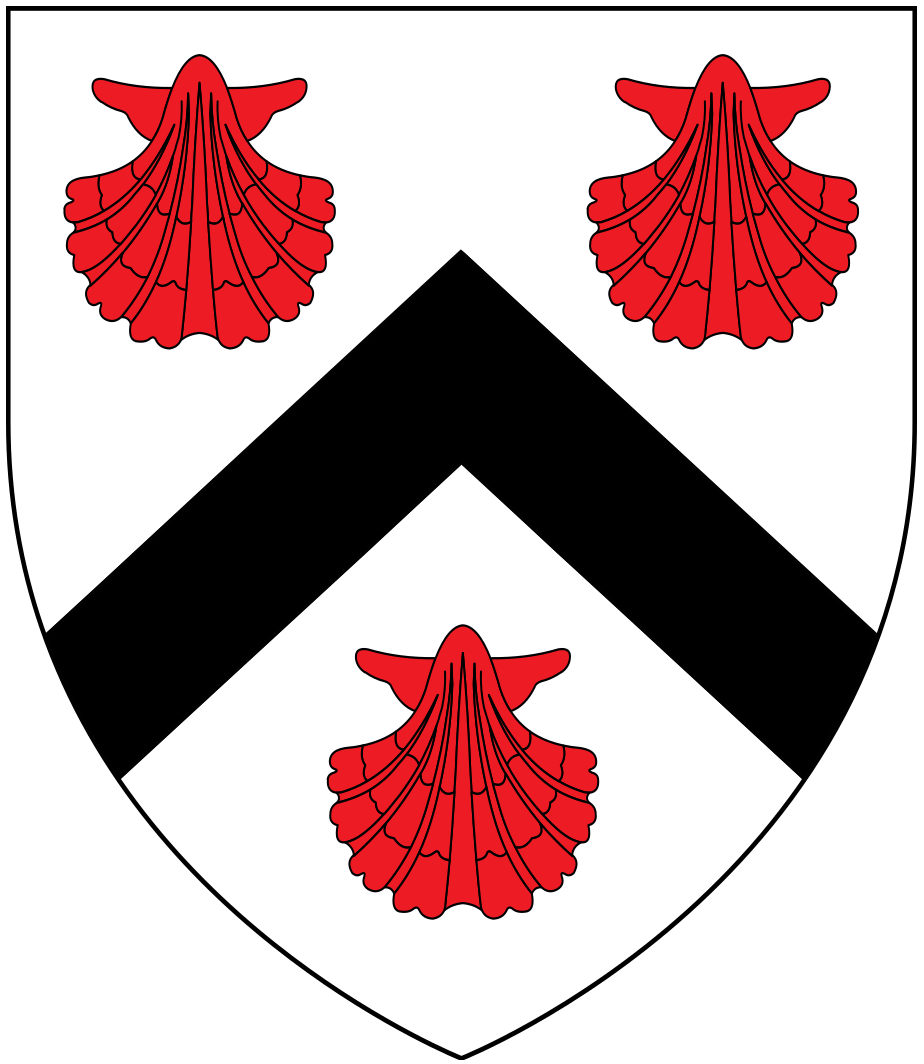
Arms of Pollard of King's Nympton: Argent, a chevron sable between three escallops gules

Sir Lewis Pollard (c. 1465 – 1540) whose will was dated 1526 when he retired to Grilstone in the parish of Bishop's Nympton, Devon, was Justice of the Common Pleas from 1514 to 1526. He served as MP for Totnes in 1491 and was a JP in Devon in 1492. He was knighted after 1509. He was one of several Devonshire men to be "innated with a genius to study law", as identified by Fuller, who became eminent lawyers at a national level. (Note: Hoskins, p. 79 mentions Fuller listing also Henry de Bracton, Sir John Cary, Sir John Wadham, Sir John Fortescue. After him came Drewe, Harris, Glanville, Sir William Periam and Sir Edmond Prideaux.) He was a kinsman of the judge and Speaker of the House of Commons Sir John Pollard (c. 1508 – 1557).

== Origins ==
Pollard was a member of an ancient Devonshire gentry family, a younger son of Robert Pollard, second son of John Pollard of Way in the parish of St Giles in the Wood, near Great Torrington, Devon, by his wife, Jane, daughter of William Marwood of Westcott (by his first wife Elizabeth Squire). Risdon states that Sir Lewis Pollard resided at Grilston, in the parish of Bishop's Nympton, before he purchased the nearby manor of King's Nympton to the south.

== Career ==
Lewis Pollard entered the Middle Temple to train as a lawyer, and was appointed Reader of that society, the third person to hold that office. He was appointed one of ten Sergeants at Law in 1505, at a great ceremonial feast in Lambeth Palace with 1,000 guests including King Henry VII himself. In 1507 Pollard was appointed the King's Sergeant-at-Law to Henry VII and three years later the appointment was renewed by Henry VIII, who soon after appointed him a Justice of the Common Pleas. He remained in this office of judge until his Retirement on 21 October 1526 his will is of 2 November 1526 Reference:National Archives PROB 11/22/220 Description: Will of Sir Lewis Pollard of Ockeford, Devon, he died in 1540 . Prince wrote of his career:

"This high and great trust of a judge (an higher than which is hardly found upon earth, the lives and livelyhoods of men being therein concern'd) Sir Lewis Pollard executed with great faithfulness and reputation, the fragrant odour whereof perfumes his memory unto this day. His knowledge in the laws and other commendable virtues (as a certain writer tells us [i.e. Thomas Westcote]) together with a numerous issue rendered him famous above most of his age and rank".

He purchased the manor of King's Nympton in Devon, where he built a residence and established a deer park. This remained the principal seat of the family for several generations and in the south aisle of the Parish Church of St James exists at the east end the "Pollard Chapel" with 17th-century panelling. He purchased the manor of Oakford in August 1507 for £203 from Sir Charles Brandon (d.1545), later Duke of Suffolk, and from his wife Margaret. The Pollards held Oakford until 1604 when it was sold by Sir Hugh Pollard to Richard Hill alias Spurway, a clothier of Tavistock.

== Marriage and children ==
He married Agnes Hext, a daughter of Thomas Hext, a prominent lawyer of Kingston in the parish of Staverton, near Totnes, Devon, by his wife Florence Bonville. Westcote stated her to be the heiress of Dunisford (or Donesford). By her he had eleven sons and eleven daughters, including:

The Heralds' Visitations of Devon lists the following sons of Sir Lewis Pollard:

- Sir Hugh Pollard (fl.1535, 1545), eldest son and heir. Sheriff of Devon in 1535/6 and Recorder of Barnstaple in 1545. He was the great-grandfather of Sir Lewis Pollard, 1st Baronet of King's Nympton.
- Sir Richard Pollard (1505–1542), 2nd son, MP for Taunton (1536) and Devon (1539, 1542), of Putney, Surrey. King's Remembrancer of the Exchequer and a law reporter He was an assistant of Thomas Cromwell in administering the surrender of religious houses following the dissolution of the monasteries, and was employed particularly as a surveyor who visited the premises and made a detailed valuation of the house's assets and income. (Note: Frequent references to his activities are recorded in Letters & Papers of Henry VIII, 1537) In 1537 he was granted by King Henry VIII the manor of Combe Martin in Devon and in 1540 Forde Abbey.
- John Pollard, 3rd son, (Note: Listed by Vivian as "Sir John" and erroneously stated to be of Ford, in fact the possession of his brother Sir Richard) Archdeacon of Wiltshire, Archdeacon of Cornwall, Archdeacon of Barnstaple (1544–1554), Archdeacon of Totnes and Canon of Exeter Cathedral. His full biography is included in Hooker's Synopsis.
- Robert Pollard (d.1576), 4th son, purchased from the crown the manor of Knowstone, where he was buried on 26 September 1576. He married Anne (or Agnes) Chichester (d.1541), daughter of Richard Chichester of Hall, Bishop's Tawton by his wife Thomasine de Hall (d.1502), heiress of Hall. His eldest son was Hugh Pollard, whose daughter Temperance Pollard (d.1637) married William Pincombe (1566–1625) of South Molton and East Buckland in Devon, Coroner of Devon, whose ancestor had come into Devon in about 1485 as a follower of Baron Zouche, lord of the manor of North Molton.
- Anthony Pollard, 5th son.
- Sir George Pollard, 6th son, knighted at Boulogne for his role in the defence of that English outpost.
- Anne Pollard, wife of Humphrey Moore (d.1537) of Moorehays in the parish of Burlescombe, in the church of which exists his monument.

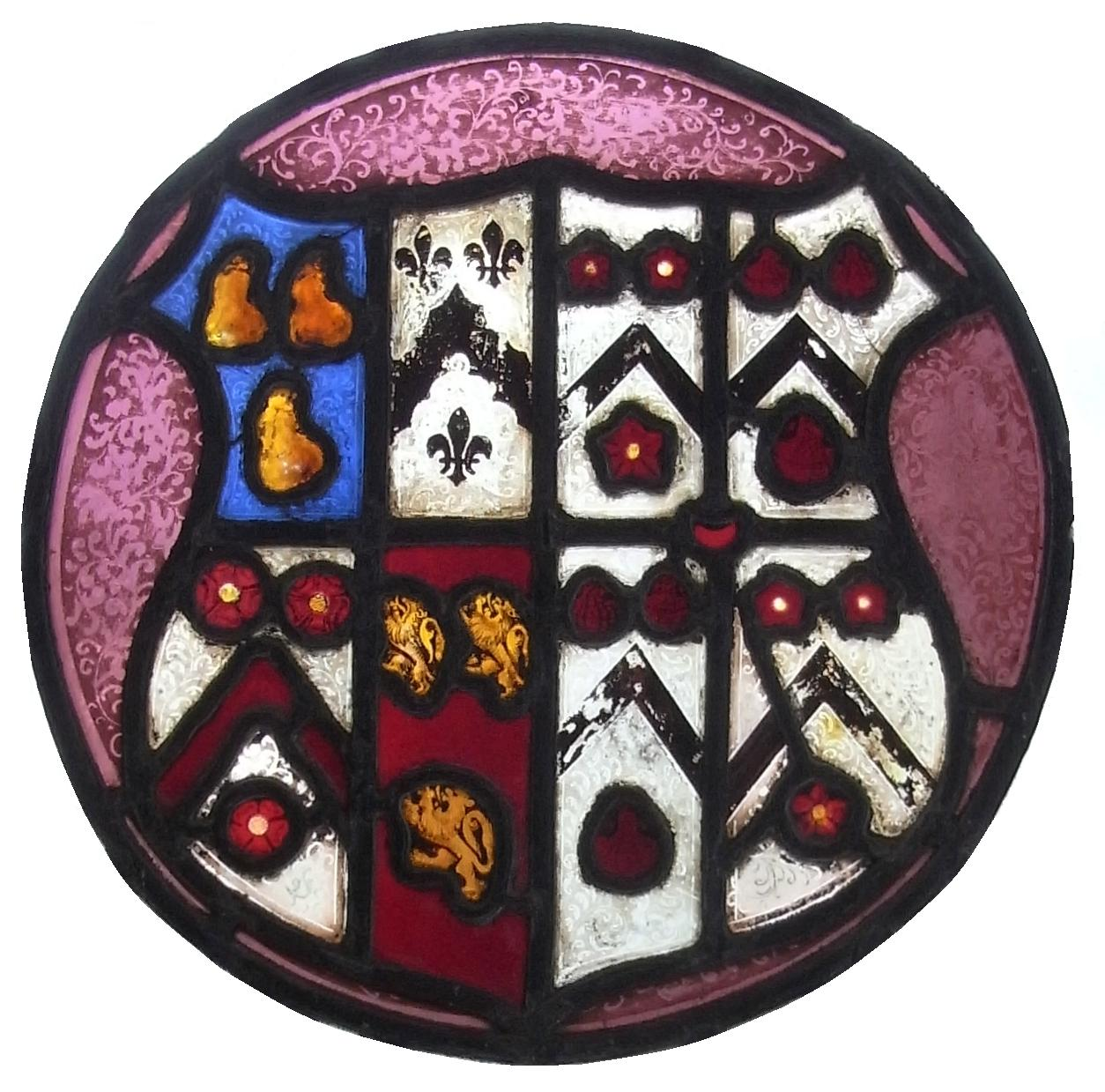
Heraldic stained-glass roundel representing marriage of Sir Hugh Stucley and Jane Pollard, King's Nympton Church

- Jane Pollard, (Note: Erroneously named as Phillippa in Vivian, p. 598, pedigree of Pollard, given corrected on p. 721, pedigree of Stucley) wife of Sir Hugh Stucley (1496–1559) lord of the manor of Affeton in Devon and mother of the mercenary Thomas Stukley. A heraldic stained-glass roundel survives in the south window of the Pollard Chapel in the south aisle of King's Nympton Church showing the arms of Stucley impaling Pollard, with quarterings of each family. The arms are as follows: baron, quarterly 1st Azure, three pears pendant or (Stucley); 2nd Argent a chevron engrailed between three fleurs-de-lis sable (de Affeton); 3rd Argent a chevron gules between three roses of the second seeded or (Manningford?); 4th Gules, three lions rampant or (FitzRoger); femme quarterly 1st & 4th Argent, a chevron sable between three mullets gules pierced or (de Via/Way of Way, St Giles in the Wood); 2nd & 3rd Argent, a chevron sable between three escallops gules (Pollard)
- Philippa Pollard, wife of Sir Hugh Paulet of Sampford Peverell (Note: Listed by Vivian as "Jane")
- Thomasine Pollard, 1st wife of Admiral Sir George Carew (d.1545)
- Elizabeth, wife firstly (as his second wife) of John Crocker of Lineham, by whom she had issue, and secondly of Sir Hugh Trevanion
- Daughter, Margaret, wife of "Hugh" Courtenay of Powderham, whose identity is uncertain. (Note: Not listed by Vivian)

== Death ==
He died on in 1540 aged 75 .His Will was made when he retired in 1526. and was buried in the church at King's Nympton, as Risdon stated "In Nymet Church Judge Pollard lieth honourably interred, having a monument erected to his memory" (see below), as well as a stained-glass memorial window nearby, now lost (see below). His reference to "Nymet" is clearly intended as Bishop's Nympton, as the passage occurs within his section on that parish, which is followed by a separate section on King's Nympton.

His will was dated 2 November 1525 and bequeathed the profits of his manor of Oakford to a chantry "to pray for my soule my father my mother my uncle Maister Lewis Pollard..." He mentioned "My Lady of Canon Lege", possibly a reference to Canonsleigh Abbey. He mentioned his brother Thomas Pollard, his sons John, Richard, Antonye, his godson Lewes Stucley and "Annes my wife", whom he requested should not remarry, in which case she should inherit together with his son John the residue of all his goods. He left £6 13s 4d towards the building of a church tower at either Bishop's Nympton or King's Nympton. (Note: Baker (History of Parliament biography) appears confused on the issue of his place of burial) The will was witnessed by Antony Pollard, Squire, and Thomas Hext, gent.

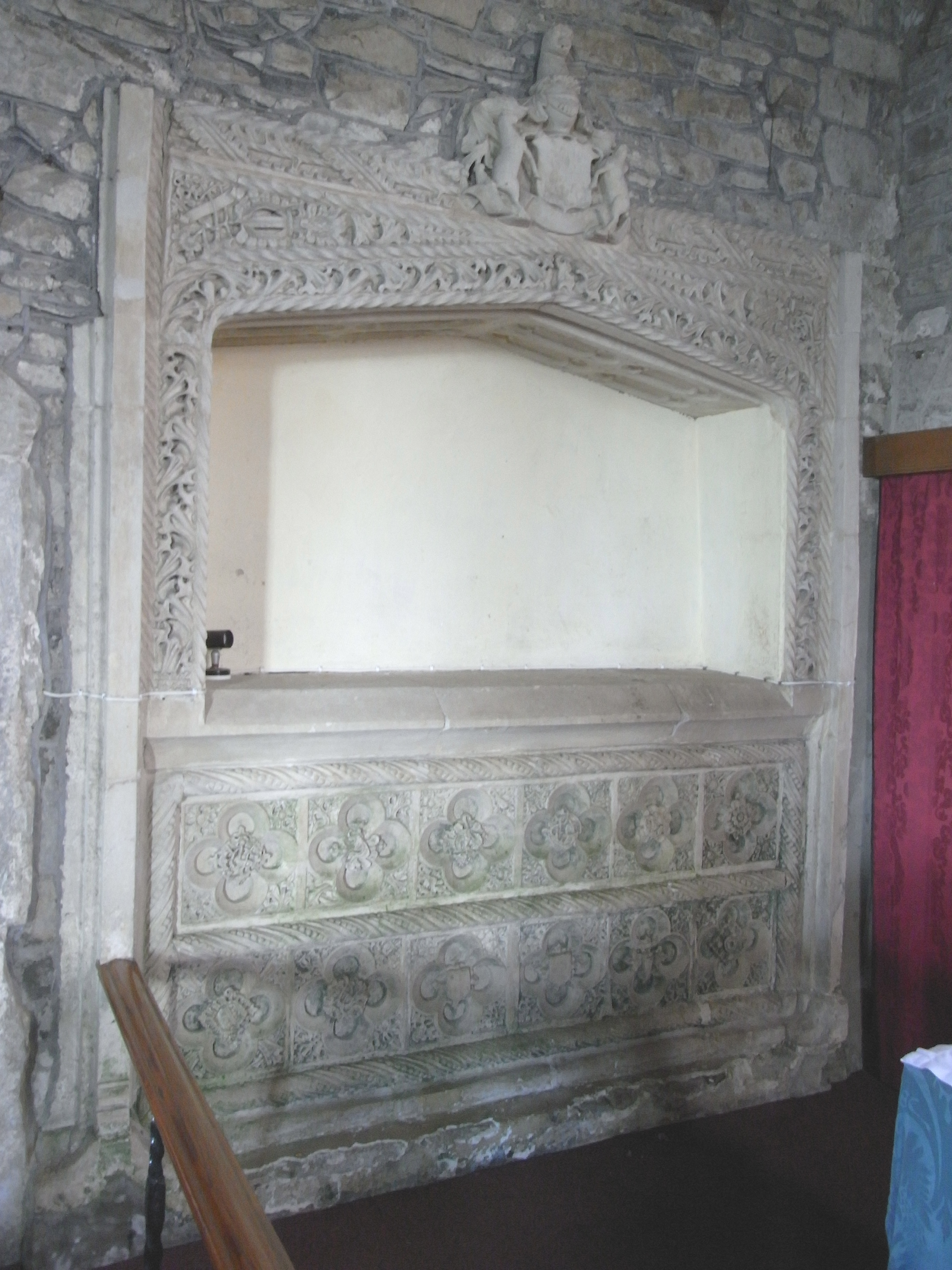
Monument, generally stated to be to Sir Lewis Pollard, north wall of chancel, Bishop's Nympton Parish Church, Devon.

The ornately sculpted late Perpendicular Gothic stone monument in Bishop's Nympton Church is generally assumed to be to Sir Lewis Pollard. (Note: Cherry & Pevsner, p. 183, states "probably to Sir Lewis Pollard"; Hoskins, pp. 337–8 also states "probably that of Sir Lewis Pollard") It is set into the north wall of the chancel, near the altar. According to Pevsner it probably doubled as an Easter Sepulchre. In 1630 when Risdon was writing his Survey of Devon, a now lost stained-glass window existed in Bishop's Nympton Church (Note: Prince vehemently stated the window was in King's Nympton Church and criticised Fuller for having stated it to have been in Bishop's Nympton Church. Risdon, the most contemporaneous source, was clear that it was in "Nymet Church", which text appeared in his section on Bishop's Nympton, before a separate section on King's Nympton) which depicted Sir Lewis Pollard, probably kneeling, with ten or eleven sons behind him on one side, and on the other side his wife facing him, probably also kneeling, with 10 or 11 daughters behind her. The following story is related by Prince:

There was a tradition of long standing in this family. That his lady, glassing this window in her husband's absence at the Term in London, caused one child more than she then had to be set up there; presuming, having had one and twenty already, and usually conceiving at her husband's coming home, that she should have another. Which, inserted in expectation, came to pass in reality.

Such arrangement of husband kneeling opposite wife, perhaps separated by a prie-dieu, he with sons behind him and she with daughters behind her, was a common composition for monuments at this period, as seen for example in the Rolle monumental brasses in Petrockstowe Church. An inscription on the glass stated, according to Risdon, "his name, marriage, office and issue" with underneath the following inscription:

Orate pro bono statu Ludovici Pollard militis unius Justiciar(iorum) Domini Regis de Banco et Eliz(abetha) uxor(is) eius qui istam fenestram fieri fecerunt (Note: Text quoted from Risdon, p. 310, full word endings as extended and shown in Prince)("Pray for the good of Lewis Pollard, knight, one of the Justices of the Bench of the Lord King, and Elizabeth his wife who brought this window into being")

== Sources ==
- Baker, J.H., "Biography of Sir Lewis Pollard", published in History of Parliament: House of Commons 1439–1509, eds. Wedgwood, J.C., & Holt A.D.
- Cherry, Bridget; Pevsner, Nikolaus The Buildings of England: Devon, Penguin Books, 1989. 2nd edition. ISBN 0-14-071050-7
- Hoskins, W.G., A New Survey of England: Devon, London, 1959
- Prince, John, Worthies of Devon, pp. 640–644
- Risdon, Tristram, Survey of Devon, 1630, 1810 ed.
- Vivian, Lt.Col. J.L., (Ed.) The Visitations of the County of Devon: Comprising the Heralds' Visitations of 1531, 1564 & 1620, Exeter, 1895
