= Bishop's Nympton =

Village in Devon, England

Coordinates: 51°00′05″N 3°46′15″W

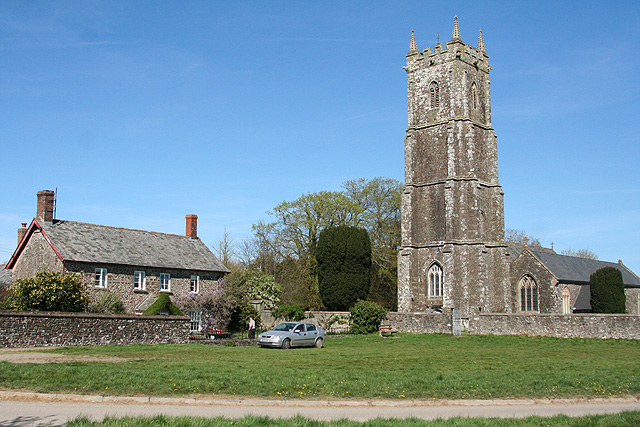
- St Mary's church

- Location within Devon
- Population: 842 (2021 census)
- Civil parish: Bishop's Nympton
- District: North Devon
- Shire county: Devon
- Region: South West
- Country: England
- Sovereign state: United Kingdom
- Police: Devon and Cornwall
- Fire: Devon and Somerset
- Ambulance: South Western

Bishop's Nympton is a village and civil parish in the North Devon district of Devon, England, about three miles east of South Molton. According to the 2021 census the parish had a population of 842. The electoral ward has the same name but covers the village and much of the land to the north-east. The ward population at the 2021 census was 2,182.

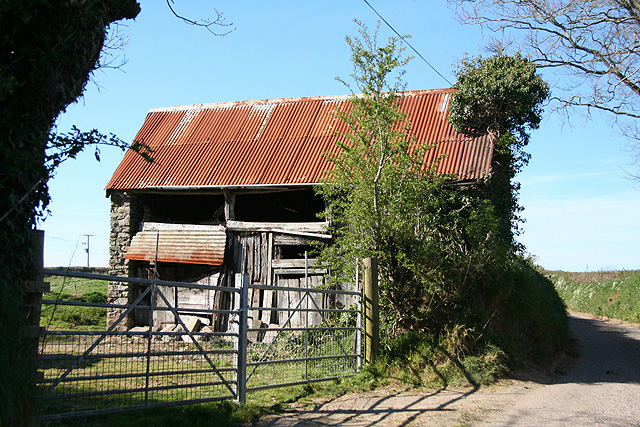
Bishop's Nympton: decayed barn.

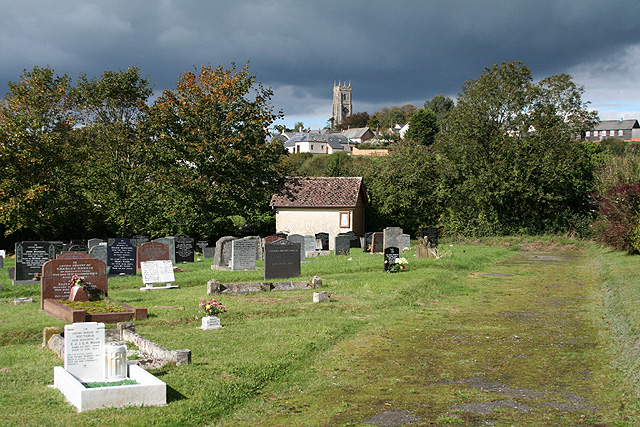
Bishop's Nympton: cemetery.

It has been the main area for the filming of a 1990s television program called The Passion. It was also home to wildlife filmmaker Johnny Kingdom who is buried in the village cemetery just outside the village.

The tall, 15th-century church tower is a local landmark, and contains a Norman baptismal font, a 15th-century arcade, and a "richly carved" Easter Sepulchre monument generally assumed to commemorate Sir Lewis Pollard (d.1526), Judge of the Common Pleas.

It has also been the location of some dispute over the recent closing of many Post Offices across the UK, and therefore the Post Office in Bishops Nympton has been partially reprieved, following a campaign by villagers and intervention by Devon County Council. From June 2009, the Post Office has been open mornings only, a great improvement on the proposed outreach service. The shop on the premises has been run by volunteers as a community shop, again with support from Devon County Council, as well as the villagers themselves. It has been successful since its opening.

A replacement for the previous (wooden) village hall was built after a long campaign of fund-raising by the villagers. Sources of funding included £15,000 from the parish council, £95,000 from the sale of the village hall, £100,000 from Leader 4 Funding and £17,000 from a section 106 agreement. It was formally opened by Mrs Frances Gunn on Friday, 3 June 2011. The village shop and Post Office moved to a purpose-built part of the new hall in the summer of 2011.

== Historic residences ==
Ancient historic residences within the parish include:

- Whitechapel Manor, home of the Bassett family
- Grilstone, Bishop's Nympton, home of the Pollard family
