= King's Nympton =

Village in Devon, England

Coordinates: 50°58′N 3°53′W

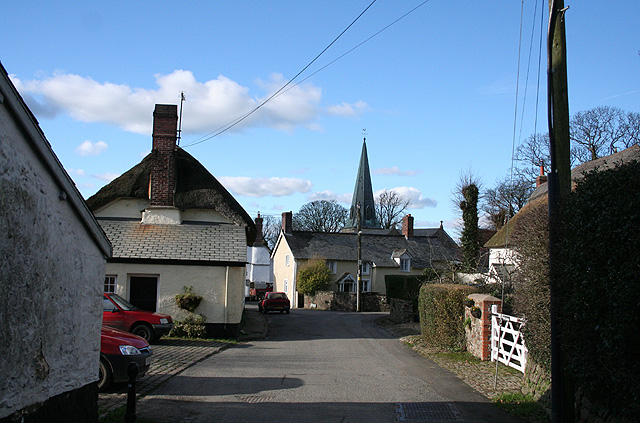
- King's Nympton, looking towards the church

- Location within Devon
- Population: 444 (2021 census)
- Civil parish: King's Nympton
- District: North Devon
- Shire county: Devon
- Region: South West
- Country: England
- Sovereign state: United Kingdom

King's Nympton (Latinised to Nymet Regis) is a village, parish and former manor in the North Devon district, in Devon, England, in the heart of the rolling countryside between Exmoor and Dartmoor, some 4½ miles (7 km) S.S.W. of South Molton and 4 miles (6 km) N. of Chulmleigh. The parish exceeds 5,500 acres (2,226 ha) in area and sits mostly on a promontory above the River Mole (anciently the Nymet) which forms nearly half of its parish boundary. In 2021 the parish had a population of 444.

Many of the outlying farmhouses date from the 15th and 16th centuries and the village has cottages and a pub, with thatched roofs. Nearly all of its 5,540 acres are given over to agriculture with beef, sheep, dairy, arable and egg production forming the bulk of farming activity.

== History ==
Ancient British people settled here in small groups on the higher ground. In around 980 AD the Church of St. James was established here by the Saxons, probably on the site of a pagan "nymet”, a sanctuary or holy grove.

At the time of the Domesday Book of 1086, the whole manor of Nimetone, in the hundred of Witheridge, belonged to the King, but King Henry I (1100–1135) granted the manor to Joel de Mayne. After passing through several families, the manor was purchased by Sir Lewis Pollard (c. 1465-1526), in whose family it remained until Sir Hugh Pollard, 2nd Baronet (c.1610-1666) sold the manor to his cousin Sir Arthur Northcote, 2nd Baronet (1628–1688).

The Northcote family held the manor until 1740 when it was sold to James Buller (the younger) whose family held it until 1842 when it was purchased by James Tanner.

== King's Nympton Park ==
Kings Nympton Park is a Grade I listed building. In 1872 it belonged to James Tanner, Esq., although the lord of the manor of King's Nympton was H. M. Byne, Esq. An on-site auction sale held by Kivell's auctioneers occurred at Park Farm on the Kingsnympton Park Estate on 25 January 2010, which included pedigree North Devon cattle, sheep and machinery.

== Railway station ==
The village gives its name to the King's Nympton railway station, although the station itself is situated 2.5 miles (4.0 km) from the village in the civil parish of Chulmleigh.
