= Northcote =

Northcote may refer to:

== People with the surname ==
- Andrew Northcote (1983-) South African born Italian cricketer
- Sir Arthur Northcote, 2nd Baronet of Haine (1628-1688), English Baronet
- Cecil Stephen Northcote (1878-1945), British military officer
- Donald Henry Northcote (1921-2004), British academic
- Geoffry Northcote (1881–1948), British colonial administrator
- Hannah Northcote (c.1761–1831), English silversmith
- Henry Northcote (disambiguation)
- James Northcote (disambiguation)
- John Northcote (1570-1632), English gentleman
- Sir John Northcote, 1st Baronet of Haine (1599-1676), English politician
- Kevin Northcote (1938-2008), Australian rules footballer
- Percy Northcote (1866–1934), English cricketer
- Sidney Northcote (1884-1952), English actor and film director
- Sydney Northcote (1897-1968), British musician and composer
- Stafford Northcote, 1st Earl of Iddesleigh (1818–1887), British politician
- Stafford Harry Northcote, Viscount Saint Cyres (1869–1926), diplomat and historian
- Thomas Northcote (disambiguation)
- Walter Northcote, 2nd Earl of Iddesleigh (1845–1927)
- William Northcote, British naval surgeon

== Places ==
- Northcote, Langho, a hotel and restaurant in Lancashire, England
- Northcote Road, shopping street in Battersea, London, England
- Northcote, Auckland, a suburb of Auckland, New Zealand
  - Northcote Tigers, a rugby league club
- Northcote, Christchurch, a suburb of Christchurch, New Zealand
- Northcote, Victoria, a suburb of Melbourne, Australia
  - Northcote City FC
  - Northcote Football Club
  - Northcote Park Football Club
  - Northcote railway station

== Electoral districts ==
- Northcote (New Zealand electorate), an electoral district in New Zealand
- Electoral district of Northcote, an electoral district in Victoria, Australia
- Northcote (Ealing ward), an electoral division in London, England
- Northcote (Wandsworth ward), an electoral division in London, England

== Other uses ==
- Northcote Burke (fl. 1927–1968), Canadian Anglican priest
- Northcote (musician)
- Str8 Outta Northcote, 1997 album by Blood Duster
- Northcote W. Thomas (1868-1936), British anthropologist
- C. Northcote Parkinson (1909-1993), British naval historian and author
- Max Northcote-Green (1994-), English rugby union footballer
- Simon Northcote-Green (1954-), English former first-class cricketer
- Northcote–Trevelyan Report, British Civil Service report
