= Henry Northcote =

Henry Northcote may refer to:

- Sir Henry Northcote, 4th Baronet (1655–1730), English doctor
- Sir Henry Northcote, 5th Baronet (1710–1743), member of parliament for Exeter 1730–1743
- Henry Northcote, 1st Baron Northcote (1846–1911), governor-general of Australia and governor of Bombay
- Henry Northcote, 3rd Earl of Iddesleigh (1901–1970), see Earl of Iddesleigh

== See also ==
- Northcote (disambiguation)
