= Sir Henry Northcote, 5th Baronet =

British politician

Sir Henry Northcote
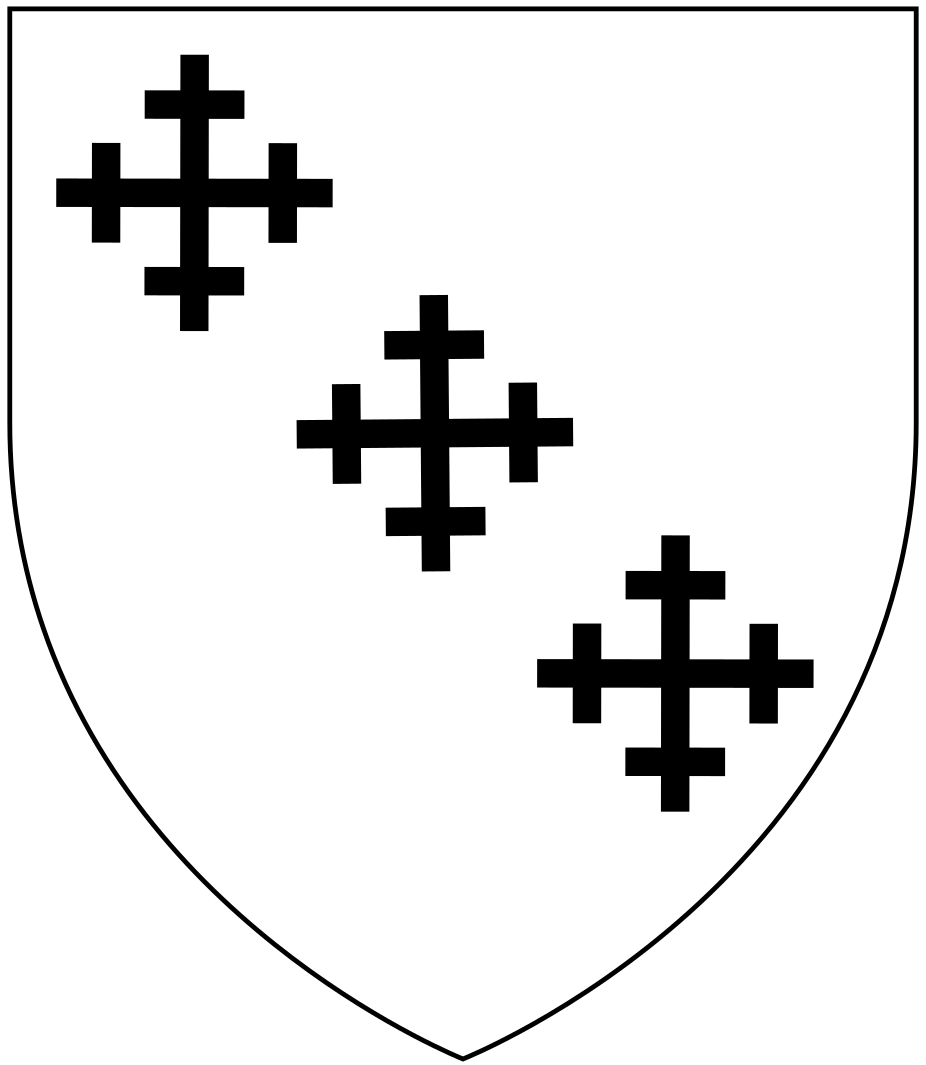
- Arms of Northcote: Argent, three cross crosslets in bend sable

Member of the Great Britain Parliament for Exeter
- In office 1735–1743 Serving with: Thomas Balle (to 1741); Humphrey Sydenham (1741-1743)
- Preceded by: John King; Thomas Balle
- Succeeded by: Humphrey Sydenham; Sir Richard Bampfylde

Personal details
- Born: 1710
- Died: 28 May 1743
- Parent: Sir Henry Northcote, 4th Baronet (father)

Sir Henry Northcote, 5th Baronet (1710 – 28 May 1743), of Hayne in the parish of Newton St Cyres near Crediton in Devon, later of Pynes in the parish of Upton Pyne, Devon, was a Member of Parliament for Exeter from 1735 until his death in 1743.

== Origins ==
He was the only son and heir of Sir Henry Northcote, 4th Baronet (1655–1730) of Hayne and of Corfe in the parish of Tawstock in North Devon, by his wife Penelope Lovett, a daughter and co-heiress of Edward Lovett (1627–1702) of Corfe in the parish of Tawstock in North Devon, and of Liscombe in Buckinghamshire, long the seat of the Lovett family. Edward Lovett's wife was Joane Hearle (1642–1709), daughter & heiress of James Hearle of Corfe, Tawstock.

== Early origins ==
The family of Northcote (originally de Northcote) originated at the Domesday Book manor of Northcote in the parish of East Down in North Devon. The Heraldic Visitations of Devon lists the founder of the family as Galfridus de Northcote, Miles ("knight"), living in 1103. In the 16th century the family made its fortune as cloth merchants at Crediton.

== Marriage and children ==
In 1732 Northcote married Bridget Maria Stafford, only daughter and sole heiress of the wealthy Hugh Stafford of Pynes. After his marriage Northcote abandoned the family seat of Hayne, which sank to the status of a farmhouse, and moved to the Stafford seat of Pynes House, inherited by his wife, where his descendants remained until the 1990s. Amongst the lands he inherited from his wife was the manor of Iddesleigh in Devon, from which in 1885 the statesman Sir Stafford Northcote, 8th Baronet took his title. Bridget Maria Stafford survived her husband and in 1754 remarried to Richard Madan of Westminster., a brother of Colonel Martin Madan. By his wife Northcote had children as follows:

- Sir Stafford Northcote, 6th Baronet (1736–1770), eldest son and heir.
- Henry Northcote (born 1738), second son, who married twice, firstly to Philipa Searle, daughter of Edward Searle of Plympton, secondly to a member of the Tooke family.
- Rev. Hugh Northcote (1740–1787), third son, Rector of Upton Pyne, who married Elizabeth Bradford, daughter of Rev. George Bradford.
- Charles Northcote (1743–1745), fourth son, died an infant.

== Sources ==
- Lauder, Rosemary, Devon Families, Tiverton, 2002, pp. 111–114, Northcote of Iddesleigh

Parliament of Great Britain
Preceded by John King; Thomas Balle	Member of Parliament for Exeter; 1735–1743 (with Thomas Balle, to 1741; Humphrey Sydenham, from 1741)	Succeeded by Humphrey Sydenham; Sir Richard Bampfylde
Baronetage of England
Preceded by Henry Northcote	Baronet (of Hayne); 1730–1743	Succeeded by Stafford Northcote
