= Sir Henry Northcote, 4th Baronet =

Arms of Northcote: Argent, three crosses-crosslet in bend sable

Sir Henry Northcote, 4th Baronet (1655–1730) was an English baronet from Devon. He was by profession a doctor of medicine. His great-great-great-grandson was Stafford Northcote, 1st Earl of Iddesleigh (1818–1887).

== Origins ==
He was the 3rd son of Sir Arthur Northcote, 2nd Baronet (1628–1688) of Hayne in the parish of Newton St Cyres, Devon, and later also of King's Nympton, Devon, by his second wife Elizabeth Godolphin (d. 1707), eldest daughter of Sir Francis Godolphin (1605–1667), KB, of Godolphin, near Helston in Cornwall.

== Inheritance ==
In 1709 aged 54 he became the heir to his childless elder brother Sir Francis Northcote, 3rd Baronet (1659–1709), their father's second but eldest surviving son, who had married Anne Wrey, daughter of Sir Chichester Wrey, 3rd Baronet (1628–1668) lord of the manor of Tawstock, Devon, who had married Lady Anne Bourchier, one of the three daughters and co-heiresses of Edward Bourchier, 4th Earl of Bath (1590–1636), and heiress of Tawstock, seat of the Bourchiers.

== Marriage and children ==
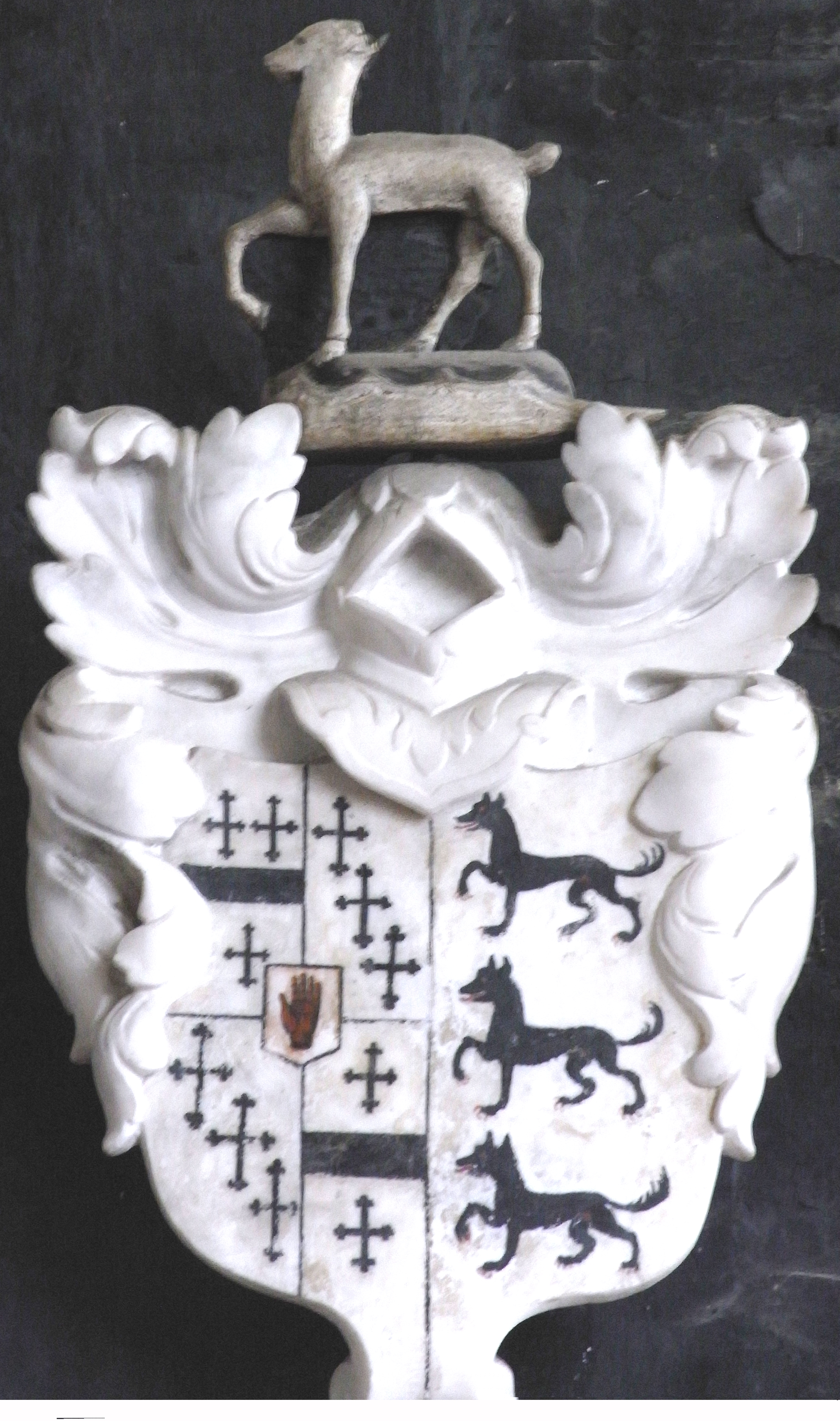
Arms of Sir Henry Northcote, 4th Baronet (1655–1730) (with Red Hand of Ulster as inescutcheon) impaling arms of Lovett of Liscombe, Buckinghamshire & Corffe, Tawstock: Argent, three wolves passant in pale sable. The Lovett arms are said to refer to the appointment of William Lovett as Master of the Royal Wolfhounds by King William the Conqueror (1066–1087). The crest of Northcote shown above is: On a chapeau gules turned up ermine a stag trippant argent. Detail from his mural monument in St Peter's Church, Tawstock

Henry married Penelope Lovett, heiress of Corffe in the parish of Tawstock, daughter and heiress of Edward Lovett (1627–1702) (son of Sir Robert Lovett (1577–1643) of Liscombe House, Soulbury, Buckinghamshire, Sheriff of Buckinghamshire in 1608 or 1610) by his wife Joane Hearle (1642–1709), daughter & heiress of James Hearle of Corffe, Tawstock. Penelope's aunt was Anne Lovett (born 1615/19), the second wife of Edward Bourchier, 4th Earl of Bath (1590–1636), of Tawstock Court, which marriage was childless. Anne married secondly (as his second wife) to Baptist Noel, 3rd Viscount Campden (1611–1682). By his wife Sir Henry had the following children:

- Sir Henry Northcote, 5th Baronet (d. 1743) only son and heir, MP for Exeter. He married Bridget Maria Stafford, only daughter and heiress of Hugh Stafford of Pynes in the parish of Upton Pyne, Devon.
- Elizabeth Northcote (d. 1758), who in 1734 at King's Nympton married John Incledon (1702–1746) of the ancient Incledon family of Buckland in the parish of Braunton, Devon, and secondly in 1747 at Braunton to Rev. John Wright.

== Death and burial ==
He resided at Corffe, Tawstock, and died there in February 1729/30 and was buried at Tawstock, in the parish church of which exists his mural monument.

== Monument at Tawstock ==
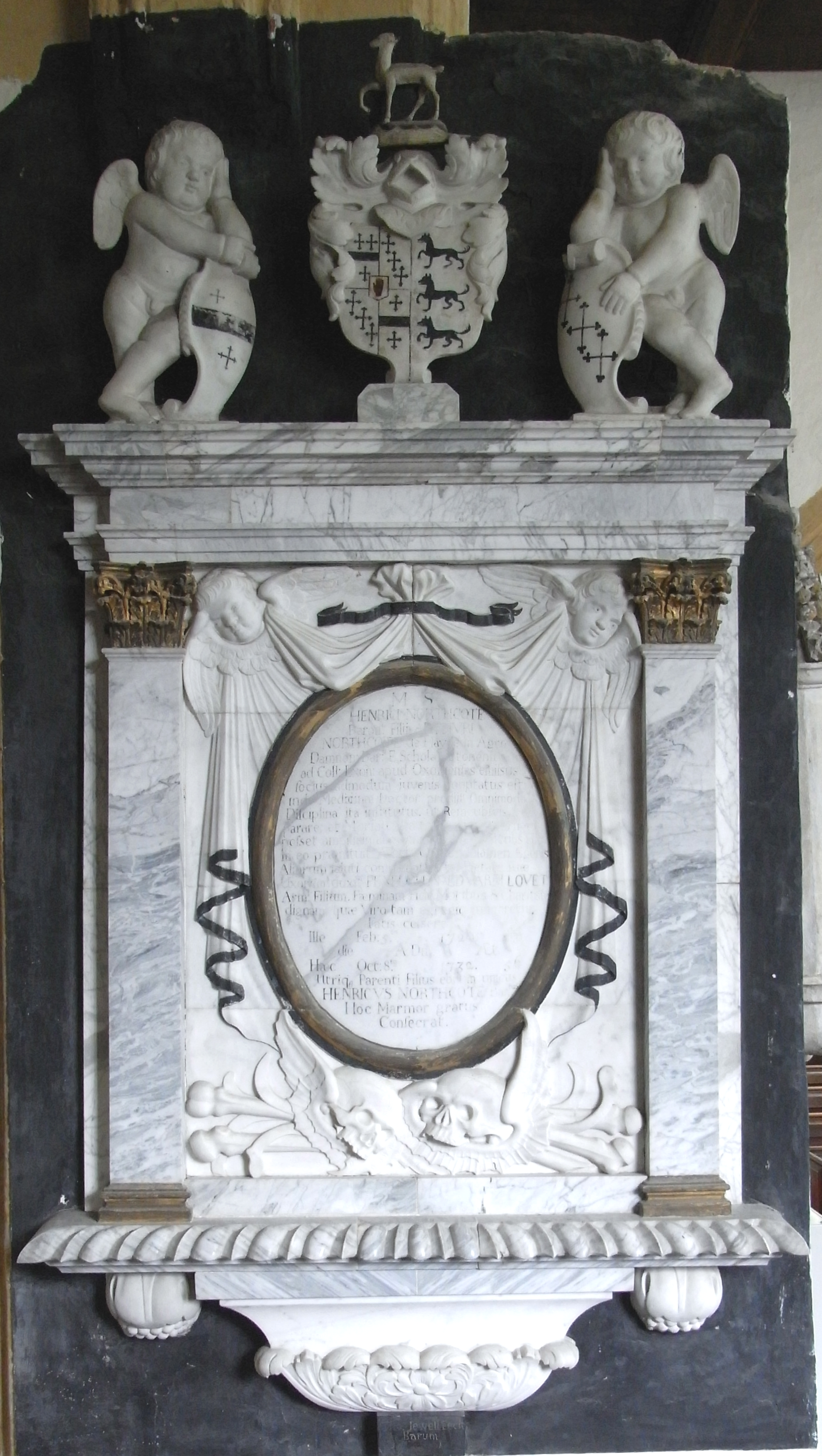
Mural monument to Sir Henry Northcote, 4th Baronet (1655–1730) of Corffe in the parish of Tawstock, Devon. St Peter's Church, Tawstock

Sir Henry Northcote's mural monument made by Thomas Jewell of Barnstaple exists in St Peter's Church, Tawstock, with the following Latin inscription:

M(emoriae) S(acrum) Henrici Northcote Baron^{ti} Filii Arthuri Northcote de Hayne in Agro Damnon(iae) Bar^{ti}. E schola Ætonensi ad Coll: Exon: apud Oxonienses emissus socius admodum juvenis cooptatus est: inde Medicinae Doctor prodiit Omnimoda Disciplina ita institutus ut Rem ubivis parare; et Moribus ita fomatus ut ornare posset amplissimam omnibus vero titulis hic in eo praenituit. Aegris opifer solamen egenis aliorum saluti consulebat arte pietate suae. Uxorem duxit Penelopen, Edvardi Lovet Arm(igeri) filiam faeminam fide moribus & charitate dignam quae viro tam egregio jungeretur. Fatis cessere(nt) Ille die Feb: 5^{to} A.Dm.1729 Æt 63 Haec die Oct: 8^{to} A.Dm. 1732 Æt 56. Utriq(ue) parenti filius eorum unicus Henricus Northcote Bar^{tus} hoc marmor gratus consecrat. ("Sacred to the memory of Henry Northcote, Baronet, son of Arthur Northcote, Baronet, of Hayne in the county of Devon. From the school of Eton he was sent to Exeter College, Oxford; as a mere youth he was elected Fellow; Thence he went forward to Doctor of Medicine. Thus established in every form of discipline that he was prepared to do whatever thing; and thus trained in usages that he was able to embellish in the highest degree with all his titles. This in him shone forth, helpful to the sick, a comfort to the poor, by his art and piety he was having regard for the health of others. For his wife he took Penelope, daughter of Edward Lovet, Esquire, a lady as worthy in her faith morals and charity as the so exceptional husband to whom she was joined. They ceded to the Fates, he, on the 5th day of February in the year of Our Lord 1729, (in the year) of his age 63; she, on the 8th day of October in the year of Our Lord 1732, (in the year) of her age 56; To both his parents their grateful only son Henry Northcote, Baronet, consecrated this marble")

== Sources ==
- Vivian, Lt.Col. J.L., (Ed.) The Visitations of the County of Devon: Comprising the Heralds' Visitations of 1531, 1564 & 1620, Exeter, 1895, pp. 581–583, pedigree of Northcote

Baronetage of England
Preceded by Francis Northcote	Baronet (of Haynes); 1709–1730	Succeeded by Henry Northcote
