= John Northcote =

English nobleman

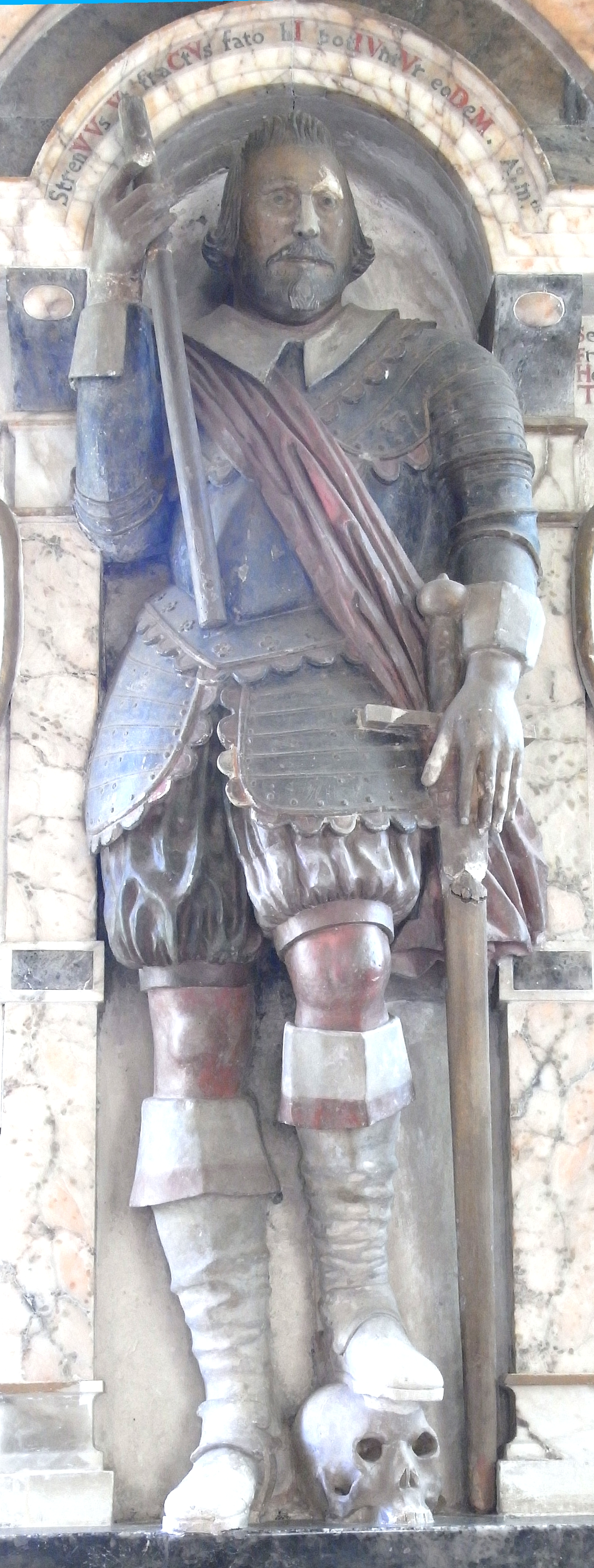
- Effigy of John Northcote in Newton St Cyres Church
- Born: 1570
- Died: 1632 (aged 61–62)
- Spouse(s): Elizabeth Rouse Susanna Pollard (m. 1596)
- Children: 19, including John

John Northcote (1570–1632) of Uton and Hayne, Newton St Cyres, near Crediton, Devon, was a member of the Devonshire gentry, lord of the manor of Newton St Cyres, who is chiefly known to history for his artistically acclaimed effigy and monument in Newton St Cyres Church. Little or no documentary evidence concerning his career as a soldier or county administrator has survived, but either he or his identically named son was Sheriff of Devon in 1626.

== Origins ==
The family of Northcote originated in Devon at the Domesday Book manor of Northcote in the parish of East Down in North Devon. The Heraldic Visitations of Devon lists the founder of the family as Galfridus de Northcote, Miles ("knight"), living in 1103. In the 16th century the family made its fortune as cloth merchants at Crediton.

He was the second son and heir of John Northcote (died 1587), a cloth merchant of Crediton, by his wife Elizabeth Dowrish (died 1587), daughter of Thomas Dowrish (died 1590) of Dowrish near Crediton. Following the Dissolution of the Monasteries, on 16 August 1557 John's grandfather, Walter Northcote and his son acquired jointly from the Crown the manor and advowson of Newton St Cyres, formerly a possession of Plympton Priory, together with other lands in the parish of Crediton formerly owned by the Collegiate Church of Crediton, also dissolved, with other lands in Wiltshire, Westmoreland and non-monastic lands in Devon.

== Marriages ==
Northcote married twice. Firstly to Elizabeth Rouse, daughter of Sir Anthony Rouse of Halton in Cornwall. They had only one son Anthonie Northcote, who died before his father in 1619.

He remarried in 1596 to Susanna Pollard (died 1634), a daughter of Sir Hugh Pollard of King's Nympton, Devon, and sister of Sir Lewis Pollard, 1st Baronet. By her he had twelve sons and six daughters, including his eldest surviving son and heir, Sir John Northcote, 1st Baronet (1599–1676), ancestor of the Earls of Iddesleigh.

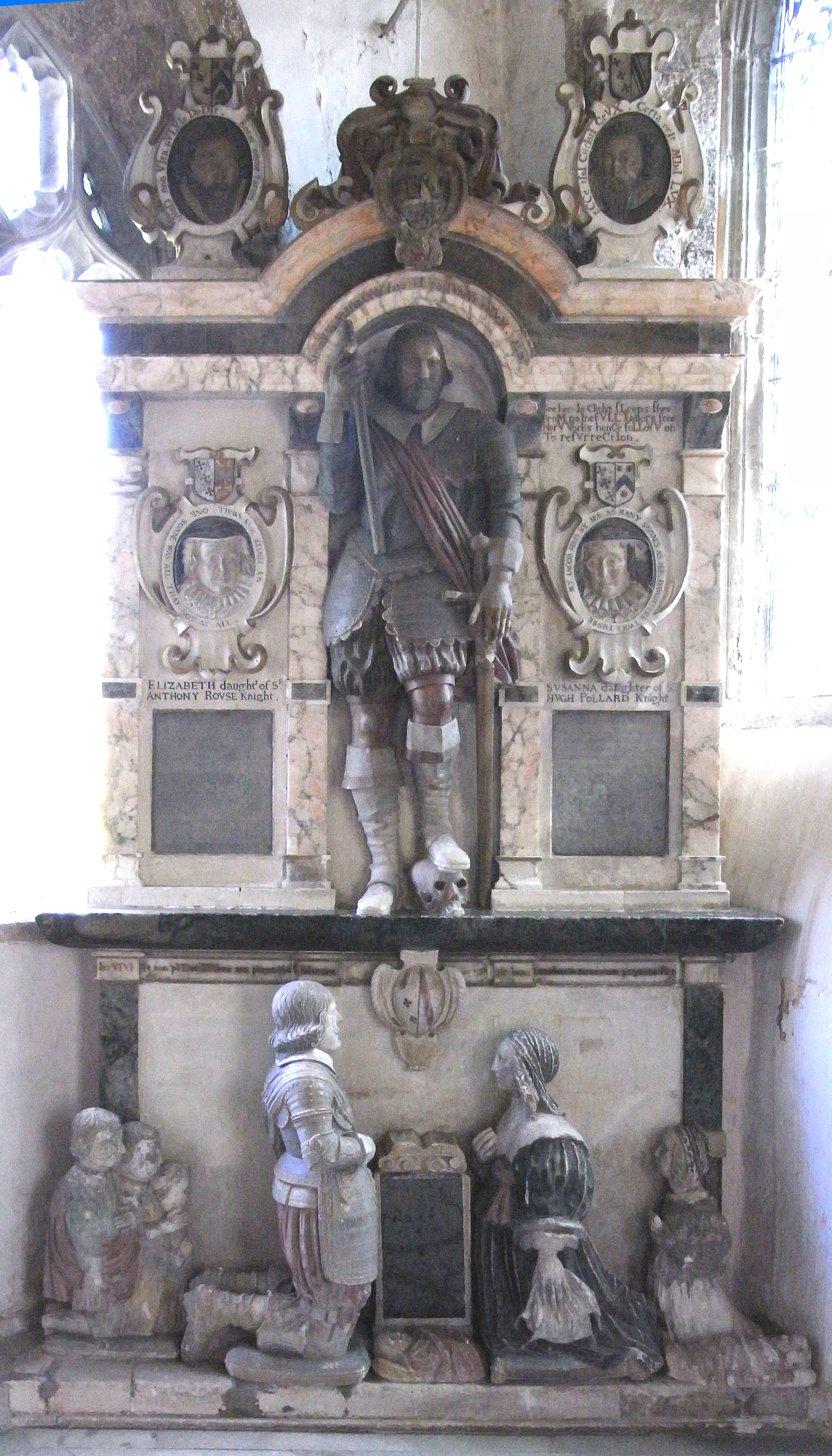
The monument to John Northcote in Newton St Cyres Church, Devon

== Monument ==
The notable monument to John Northcote is in the Northcote Chapel in Newton St Cyres parish church. Northcote himself is the main central figure wearing high boots and carrying a sword and baton. Medallions to his left and right display the busts of his two wives, with inscriptions. Below these are kneeling figures of his son, his wife and other children.

== Sources ==
- Vivian, Lt.Col. J.L., (Ed.) The Visitations of the County of Devon: Comprising the Heralds' Visitations of 1531, 1564 & 1620, Exeter, 1895, p. 582, pedigree of Northcote
- Listed building text, Church of St Cyriac and St Julitta
