= John Quicke =

Arms of Quicke: Sable, a chevron vaire or and of the first between three griffin's heads erased of the second

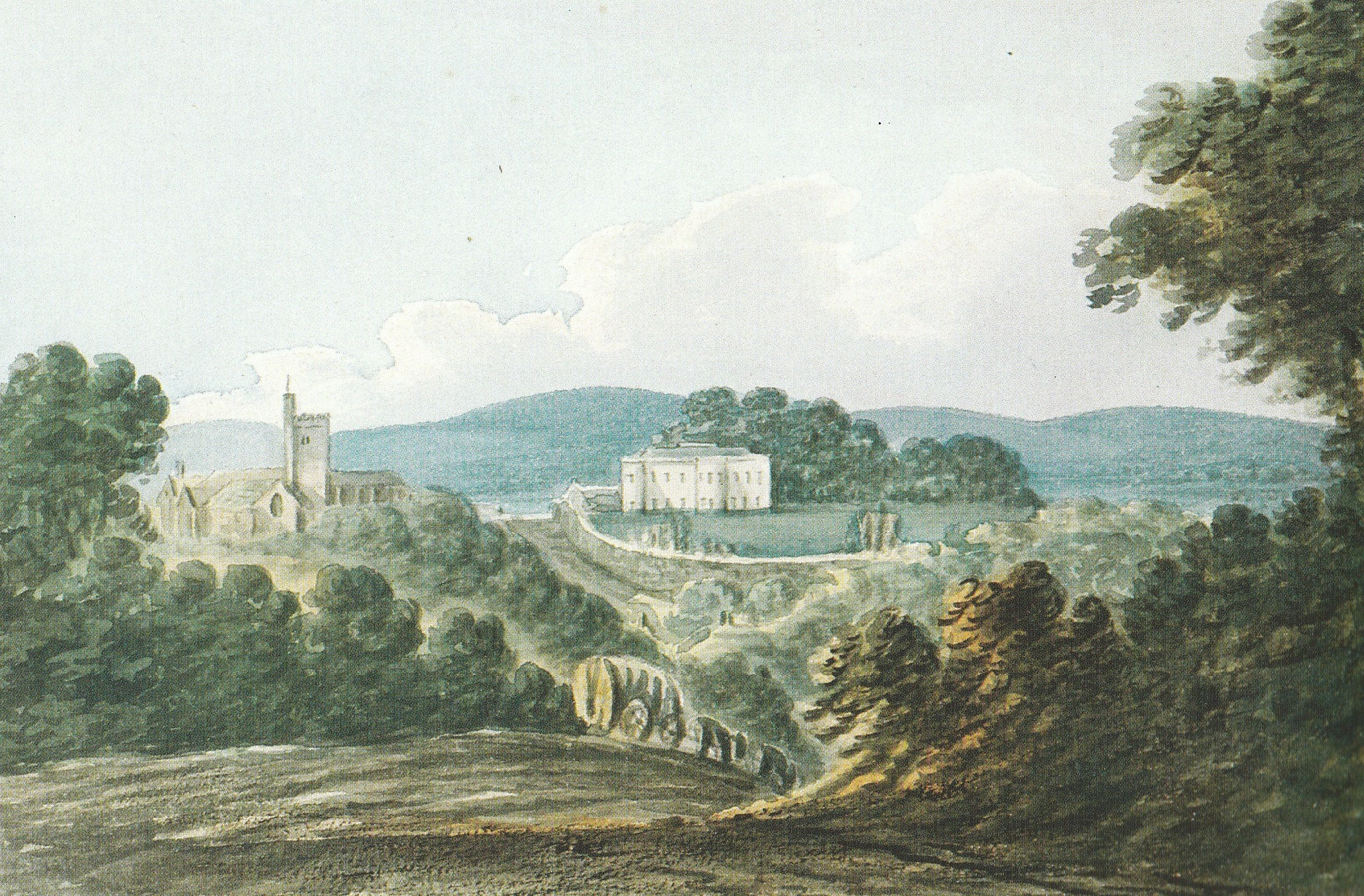
1797 watercolour of Newton House by Rev. John Swete, showing the house about 30 years after it was built by John Quicke

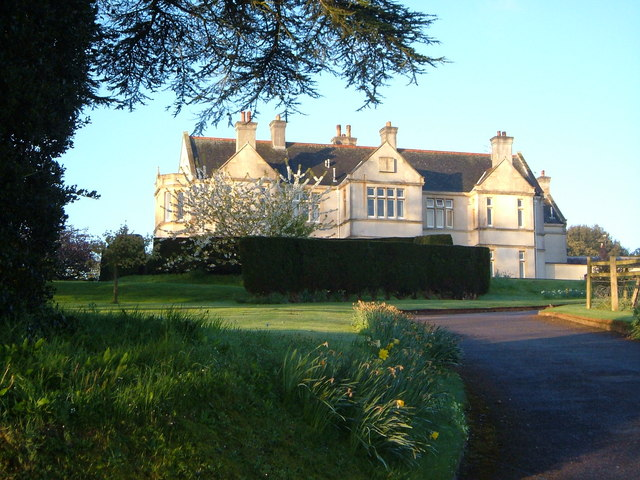
Newton House, as rebuilt in 1909 after the fire of 1906

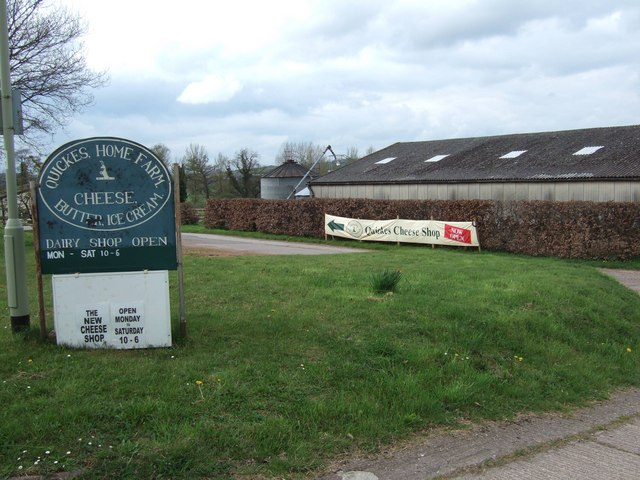
Quicke's Cheeses, the business established at Newton St Cyres by the present descendant of John Quick, namely Sir John Quicke (the tenth), CBE, chairman of the Ministry of Agriculture's Regional Board 1972-5, using milk from the 2,400 acre estate in the parish still owned today by the Quicke family

John Quicke (1724–1776) of Newton House in the parish of Newton St Cyres in Devon was Sheriff of Devon in 1757.

== Origins ==
According to Lauder (2002) he was the sixth John to have been head of the family. He was the eldest son and heir of the fifth John Quicke (died 1729) by his wife Rebecca Nutcombe (died 1733), a daughter and heiress of Richard Nutcombe of Nutcombe in the parish of Clayhanger, Devon, who also owned the adjoining manor of Ashbrittle in Somerset, inherited by marriage from the Doble family. His paternal grandmother (wife of Andrew Quicke (1666–1736) of Newton St Cyres) was Dorothy Northcote (died 1728), a daughter of Sir Arthur Northcote, 2nd Baronet of Hayne in the parish of Newton St Cyres, by his wife Elizabeth Godolphin, a daughter of Sir Francis Godolphin (1605–1667) and a sister of Sidney Godolphin, 1st Earl of Godolphin (1645–1712), First Lord of the Treasury. Elizabeth's nephew Francis Godolphin, 2nd Earl of Godolphin (1678–1766) married Henrietta Churchill, suo jure Duchess of Marlborough (1681–1733) the daughter of the great John Churchill, 1st Duke of Marlborough. This Northcote marriage gave the Quicke family a "strong connection" (Lauder, 2002) with the powerful Churchill family, until Henrietta's line died out. His younger brother was Rev. Nutcombe Quicke (1727/8-1809), Chancellor of Exeter Cathedral, who inherited his maternal estates and in 1792 assumed the surname Nutcombe (thus becoming Rev. Nutcombe Nutcombe), having married a daughter of George Lavington, Bishop of Exeter. The "fine memorial" of Rev. Nutcombe Nutcombe survives in Clayhanger Church.

It is said by the Quicke family that they had inherited their estate in Newton St Cyres on the marriage of Richard Quicke of Sandford to the heiress Elizabeth Bidwell, daughter of John Bidwell of Newton St Cyres (parents of Andrew Quicke (died 1557) of Newton St Cyres).

== Career ==
Quicke served as Sheriff of Devon in 1757, becoming the first in his family to hold that prominent position and to serve in public life. It was an office subsequently held by his son, grandson and great-grandson, all named John. He built Newton House in about 1770, in the Georgian style.

== Marriage and children ==
In 1758 he married Jane Coster, a daughter of the wealthy Bristol merchant and mine-owner Thomas Coster (1684–1739), a Member of Parliament for Bristol, 1734-9. Jane was the widow of Robert Hoblyn (1710–1756) a wealthy tin miner of Nanswhyden (alias Nanswhyddon) in Cornwall, a Member of Parliament for Bristol 1742–54, whose mother was Penelope Godolphin, a daughter of Sidney Godolphin (1652–1732), Member of Parliament, a cousin of Sidney Godolphin, 1st Earl of Godolphin (1645–1712), Knight of the Garter, First Lord of the Treasury, thus related to the Quick family. Jane inherited from her father a large fortune of £40,000 and having had no children by her first husband the inheritance came to the Quickes. By his wife he had one son:

- John Quicke (1759–1830) (the seventh), eldest son and heir, Sheriff of Devon in 1782. He is recorded in 1810 as lord of the manor of Newton St Cyres. His son and grandson also served as Sheriff of Devon, in 1833 and 1867 respectively.

== Death and burial ==
John Quicke was buried on 7 June 1776 at Newton St Cyres, in which church survives his mural monument, comprising coloured marbles and an urn. The inscription on the monument was transcribed by Rev. John Swete (died 1821), as follows:

"In memory of John Quicke, Esq., who departed this life May 31st 1776 aged 52. In his character were united the politeness of a gentleman and the sincerity of a Christian. He was esteemed and beloved wherever he was known. His charity to the poor was extensive. His benevolence to mankind, universal. The fatal stroke which snatch'd him from his friends was to them most afflicting; but he had long foreseen, expected and prepared for it. To a good man no death can be sudden or immature. Reader! wouldest thou die his death, live after his example".
