= Sir John Northcote, 1st Baronet =

17th-century English politician

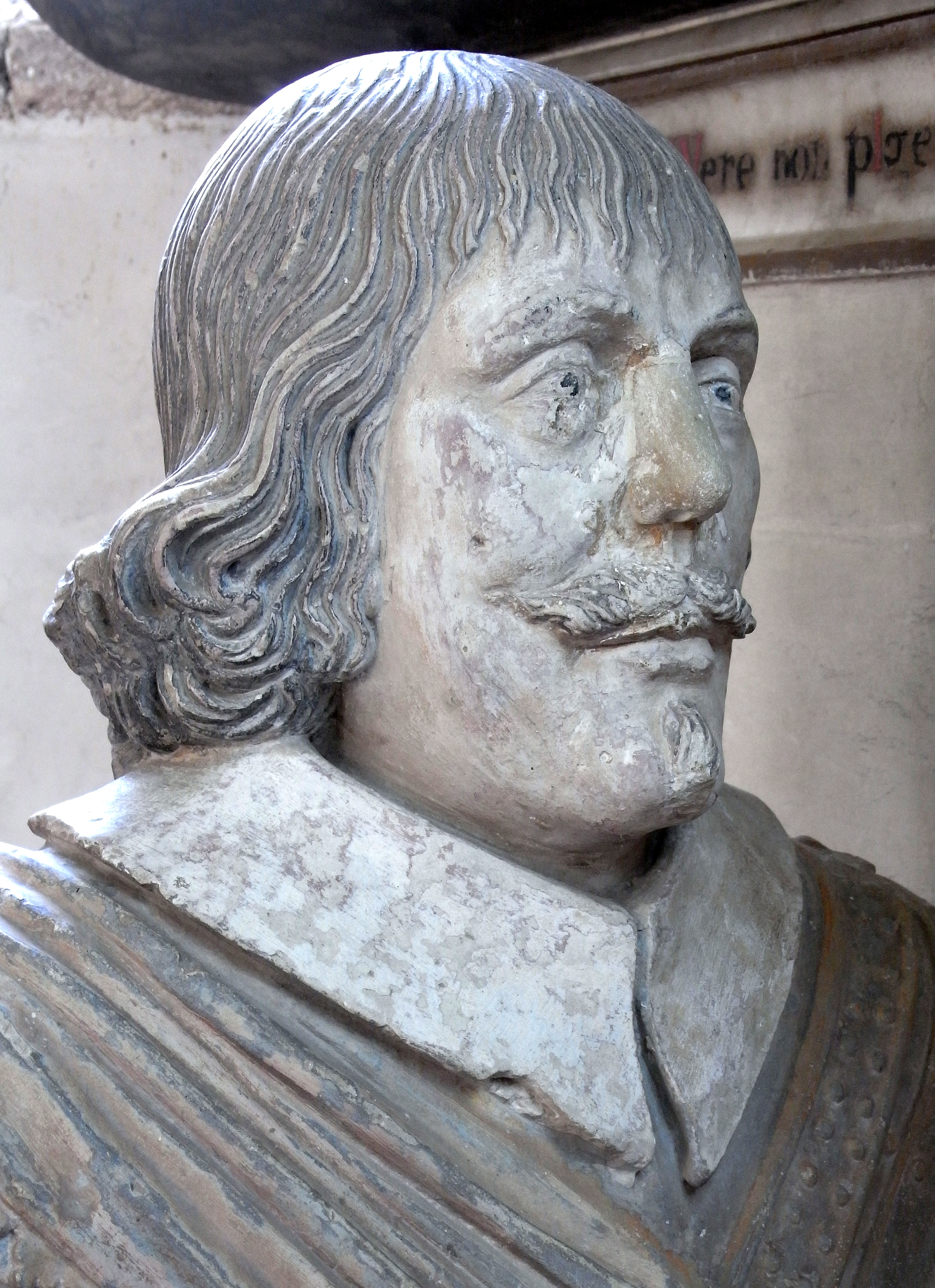
- Sir John Northcote, 1st Baronet (1599–1676), detail of his kneeling effigy at base of monument he erected to his father John Northcote (1570–1632) in Newton St Cyres Church, Devon

Member of Parliament for Barnstaple
- In office 1667–1676

Member of Parliament for Devon
- In office 1654-1659; 1660–1661

Member of Parliament for Ashburton
- In office 1640–1648

High Sheriff of Devon
- In office 1626–1627

Personal details
- Born: 1599
- Died: 24 June 1676 (aged 76–77)
- Spouse: Grace Halswell
- Children: 11, including Arthur
- Parent: John Northcote (father)
- Education: Exeter College, Oxford

Arms of Northcote: Argent, three crosses-crosslet in bend sable

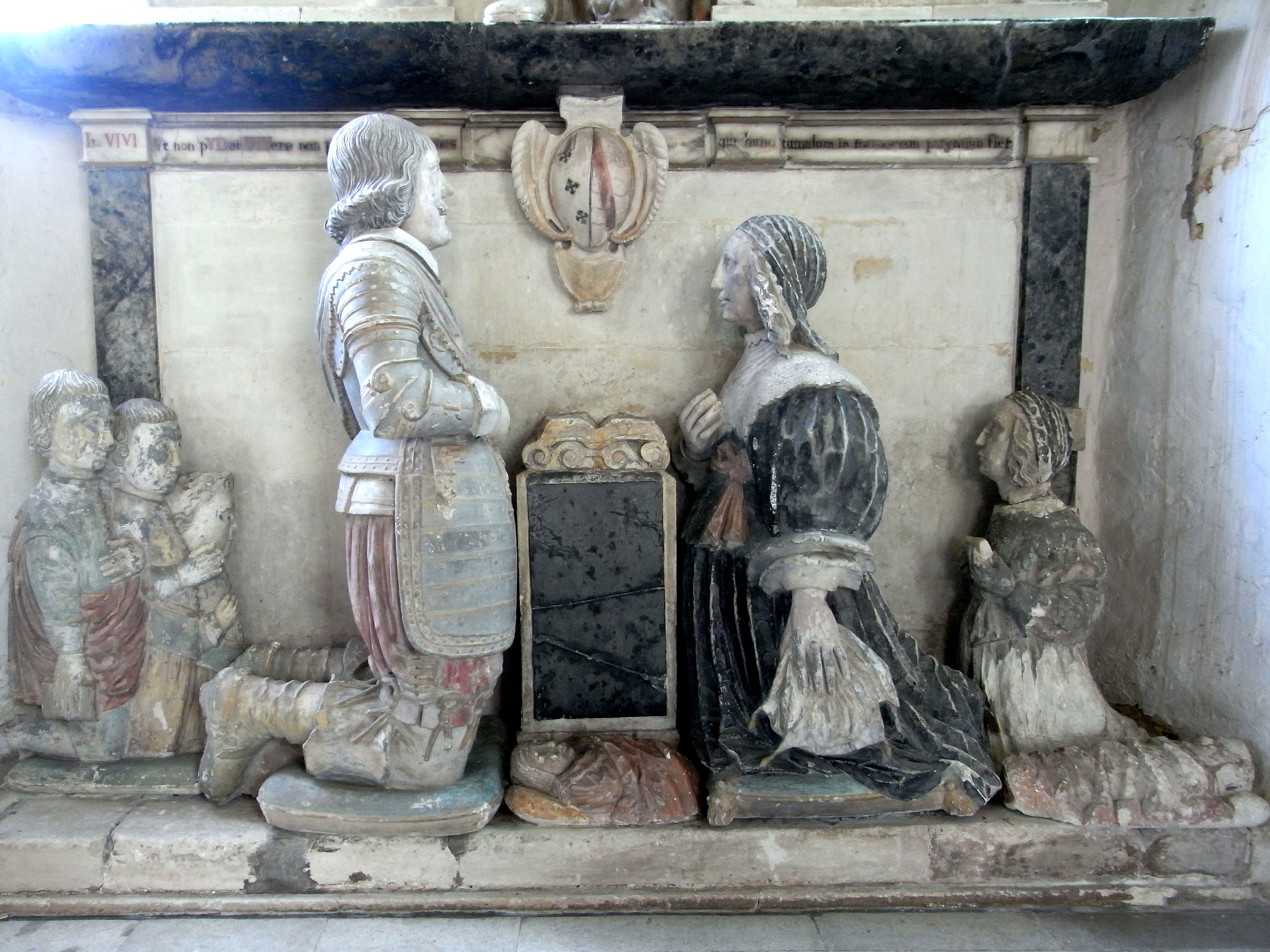
Effigies of Sir John Northcote, 1st Baronet (1599–1676) and his wife Grace Halswell (died 1675). Detail from base of monument to his father John Northcote (1570–1632), Newton St Cyres Church. On a cartouche above are shown the arms of Northcote impaling Azure, three bars wavy argent overall a bend gules (Halswell). Their sons are shown kneeling behind their father and their daughters behind their mother. the effigies of some infants of both genders lie on the floor in swaddling clothes

Sir John Northcote, 1st Baronet (1599 – 24 June 1676) was an English politician who sat in the House of Commons at various times between 1640 and 1676. He supported the Parliamentarian cause in the English Civil War.

== Origins ==
Northcote was the eldest surviving son of John Northcote (1570–1632) of Hayne, Newton St Cyres, near Crediton, Devon, (whose splendid monument he erected in Newton St Cyres Church) by his second wife Susanna Pollard, daughter of Sir Hugh II Pollard of King's Nympton. The family of Northcote originated in Devon at the Domesday Book manor of Northcote in the parish of East Down in North Devon. The Heraldic Visitations of Devon lists the founder of the family as Galfridus de Northcote, Miles ("knight"), living in 1103. The family later in the 16th century made its fortune as cloth merchants at Crediton

== Education ==
He matriculated at Exeter College, Oxford on 9 May 1617, aged 16 and was a student of Middle Temple in 1618.

== Career ==
In November 1640 he was elected Member of Parliament for the newly re-established borough of Ashburton in the Long Parliament. On 16 July 1641, he was created a baronet.

Having Presbyterian sympathies, on the outbreak of the Civil War, he declared for Parliament, and used his considerable wealth and influence to aid the cause. In 1642 he provided £450 to finance military action in Ireland, and in June promised more money and troops for the war in England. His actions were sufficiently notable for him to be excluded by name from the general pardon issued in November 1642 by King Charles I. Having begun the war commanding a regiment of the Devon Trained Bands, by 1643 Sir John was leading a regiment of 1,200 men in Devon, and was taken prisoner by royal forces after the surrender of Exeter in September 1643.

Northcote was kept captive until the autumn of 1644, when he was exchanged, and resumed his Parliamentary seat in May 1645. He subscribed to the Covenant, and was excluded from Parliament in Pride's Purge in December 1648, but returned to the House of Commons once more as Member for Devon in all three Parliaments of the Protectorate. In the last of these, during Richard Cromwell's rule, he was a frequent speaker, and after the restoration of the Rump Parliament he took a leading role in organising a petition from Devon to the Speaker that the vacant seats should be filled. In the Convention Parliament of 1660 he was elected both for Devon and for Helston, though his return for the latter was ruled void. He subsequently sat also for Barnstaple from 1667 until his death.

A manuscript purporting to be the Notebook of Sir John Northcote, containing Memoranda of Proceedings during the first session of the Long Parliament, 1640 was published in 1887. However, its authenticity was challenged on the grounds that it covered a period before Sir John had a seat in the House.

== Marriage and children ==
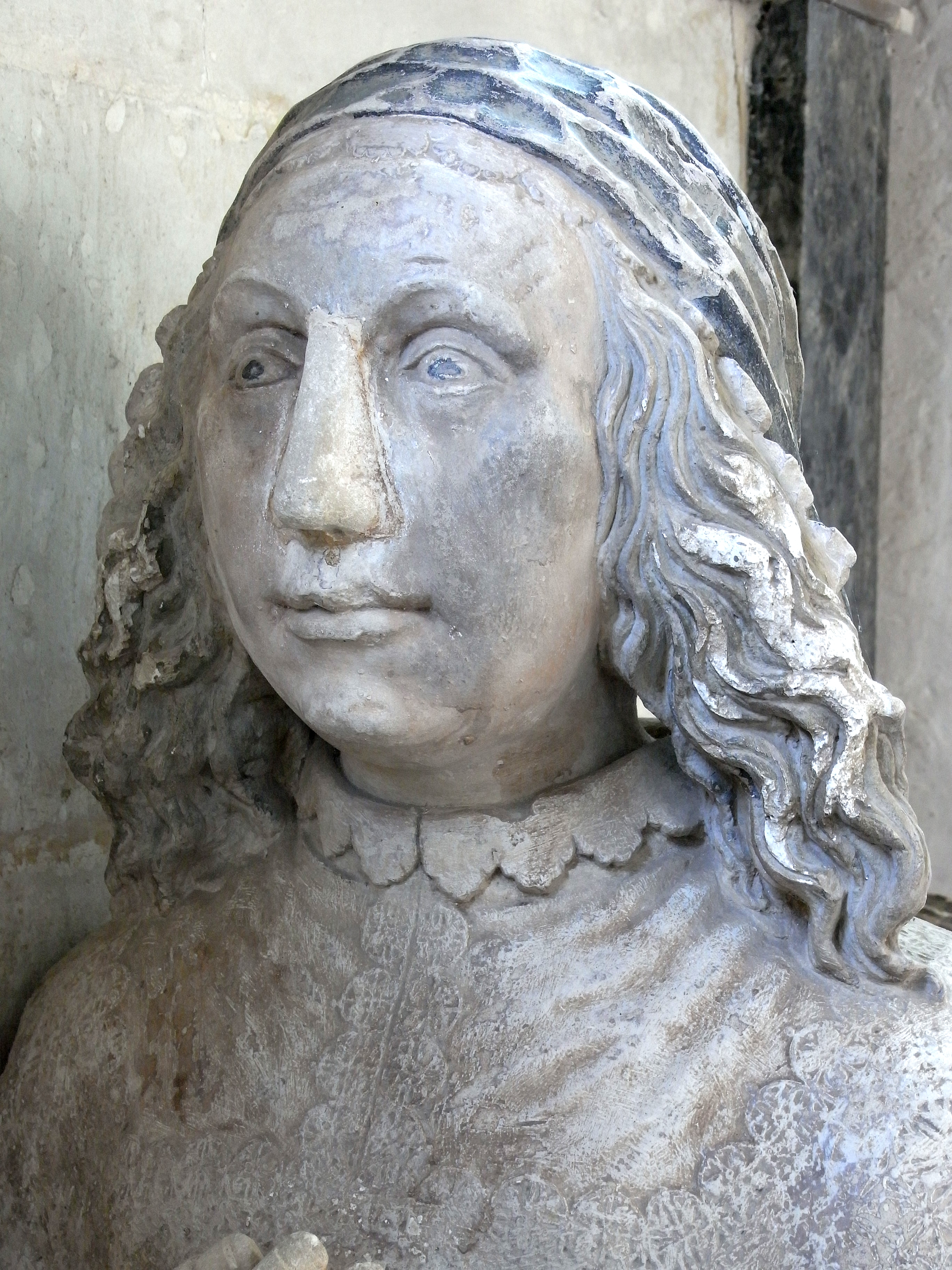
Grace Halswell (died 1675), wife of Sir John Northcote, 1st Baronet (1599–1676). Detail from her kneeling effigy at base of monument to her father-in-law John Northcote (1570–1632), Newton St Cyres Church

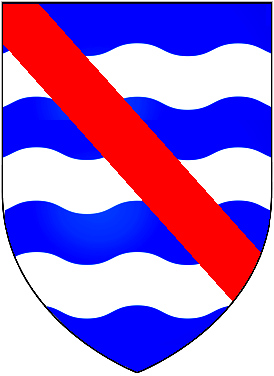
Arms of Halswell: Azure, three bars wavy argent over all a bend gules

Northcote married Grace Halswell (died 1675), a daughter and heiress of Hugh Halswell (died 1626) of Chamberlain Street, Wells, Somerset, by his wife and cousin Elizabeth Brounkard. Hugh was the son of Richard Halswell and Cicely Reeves, and grandson of Robert Halswell (died 1570) of Halswell, Somerset. Northcote had by Grace seven sons and four daughters:

- Sir Arthur Northcote, 2nd Baronet (1628–1688), eldest son and heir.
- John Northcote (born 1629), 2nd son, married Catherine Foljambe.
- Lewis Northcote, 3rd son, married Jane Copleston
- Hugh Northcote (born 1635), apparently died young
- Halswell Northcote (born 1639), 4th son, married Mary Crooke.
- William I Northcote (1642–3), died young
- William II Northcote (born 1648), married Alice Leigh
- Susanna Northcote (born 1633), married in 1653, as his 2nd wife, Col. Robert Fortescue (1617–1677), 2nd son of Hugh Fortescue (1593–1663) of Filleigh by his wife Mary Rolle, daughter of Robert Rolle (died 1633) of Heanton Satchville, Petrockstowe. Their only son Robert Fortescue (1633–1633), died an infant, whose mural monument exists in Newton St Cyres Church. Of their three daughters, two died as infants, but the eldest Elizabeth Fortescue (born 1659) survived and married George Horner (1646–1707) of Mells Manor in Somerset, and was the grandmother of Elizabeth Fox, Countess of Ilchester. The daughter from Robert Fortescue's first marriage to Grace Grenville, daughter of Sir Bevil Grenville was Grace Fortescue who married Sir Halswell Tynte, 1st Baronet (1649–1702), MP for Bridgwater 1679–1689. Tynte was a cousin of Grace Halswell, being the son of Jane Halswell (died 1650) (sole heiress of Rev. Hugh Halswell (died 1672) of Halswell), the wife of John Tynte, whose inheritance became the manor of Halswell.
- Grace I Northcote (1632–1632), died young
- Elizabeth Northcote (born 1638), married Thomas Pointingdon.
- Grace II Northcote (1641–1660)

== Sources ==
- Vivian, Lt.Col. J.L., (Ed.) The Visitations of the County of Devon: Comprising the Heralds' Visitations of 1531, 1564 & 1620, Exeter, 1895, p. 582, pedigree of Northcote

Parliament of England
New constituency	Member of Parliament for Ashburton; 1640–1648; With: Sir Edmund Fowell	Not represented in Rump Parliament
Preceded by Seven members	Member of Parliament for Devon; 1654–1659; With: ten others (1654–8); Robert Rolle 1659	Not represented in Restored Rump
Vacant Not represented in Restored Rump	Member of Parliament for Devon; 1660–1661; With: General George Monck 1660; Sir Edward Seymour 1660-1	Succeeded by Sir Hugh Pollard, Bt; Sir John Rolle
Preceded by Nicholas Dennys; Sir John Chichester	Member of Parliament for Barnstaple; 1667–1676; With: Nicholas Dennys	Succeeded by Nicholas Dennys; John Basset
Baronetage of England
New creation	Baronet (of Hayne); 1641–1676	Succeeded by Arthur Northcote
Honorary titles
Preceded by ?	High Sheriff of Devon; 1626–1627	Succeeded by ?
