= Sir Arthur Northcote, 2nd Baronet =

English nobleman

- Arms of Northcote: Argent, three crosses-crosslet in bend sable
- Born: 1628
- Died: 1688 (aged 59–60)
- Spouse(s): Elizabeth Welsh (d. 1652); Elizabeth Godolphin
- Children: 11
- Father: John Northcote

Sir Arthur Northcote, 2nd Baronet (1628–1688) was a baronet from Devon, England. He lived at Hayne in the parish of Newton St Cyres, Devon, where the mansion house has since been demolished; and also at King's Nympton, Devon, a manor that he purchased from Sir Hugh Pollard, 2nd Baronet, his father's first cousin, and where he was buried.

== Biography ==
The family of Northcote originated in Devon at the Domesday Book manor of Northcote in the parish of East Down in North Devon. The Heraldic Visitations of Devon lists the founder of the family as Galfridus de Northcote, Miles ("knight"), living in 1103. In the 16th century the family made its fortune as cloth merchants at Crediton.

Sir Arthur was the son and heir of Sir John Northcote, 1st Baronet (1600–1676), MP, of Hayne in the parish of Newton St Cyres, Devon, by his wife Grace Halswell.

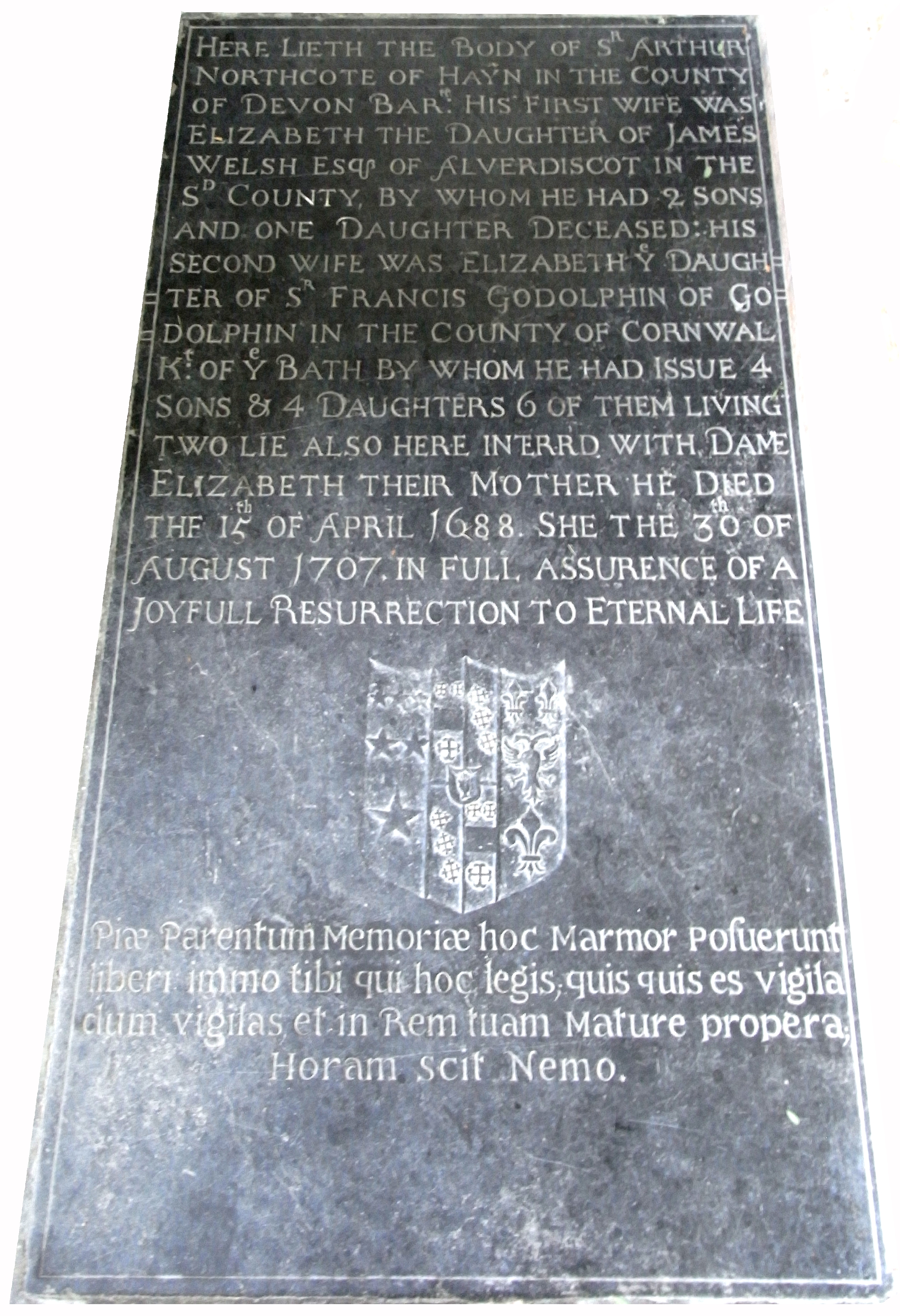
Ledger stone of Sir Arthur Northcote, 2nd Baronet, King's Nympton Church

He married twice:

- Firstly to Elizabeth Welsh (1630–1652), daughter and heiress of James Welsh of Alverdiscott, Devon. They had two sons and a daughter, but all pre-deceased him.
- Secondly to Elizabeth Godolphin (1635–1707), eldest daughter of Sir Francis Godolphin (1605–1667), KB, of Godolphin, near Helston in Cornwall. This marriage produced four sons and four daughters. His eldest surviving son was Sir Francis Northcote, 3rd Baronet (1659–1709) followed by his third surviving son, Sir Henry Northcote, 4th Baronet.

Sir Arthur died in 1688 and was buried at King's Nympton, the manor he had recently purchased from Sir Hugh Pollard, 2nd Baronet, his father's first cousin. His large black slate ledger stone survives in King's Nympton Church.

== Sources ==
- Vivian, Lt.Col. J.L., (Ed.) The Visitations of the County of Devon: Comprising the Heralds' Visitations of 1531, 1564 & 1620, Exeter, 1895, pp. 581–583, pedigree of Northcote

Baronetage of England
Preceded by John Northcote	Baronet (of Hayne); 1676–1688	Succeeded by Francis Northcote
