= Arthur Tremayne (1701–1796) =

British Tory politician

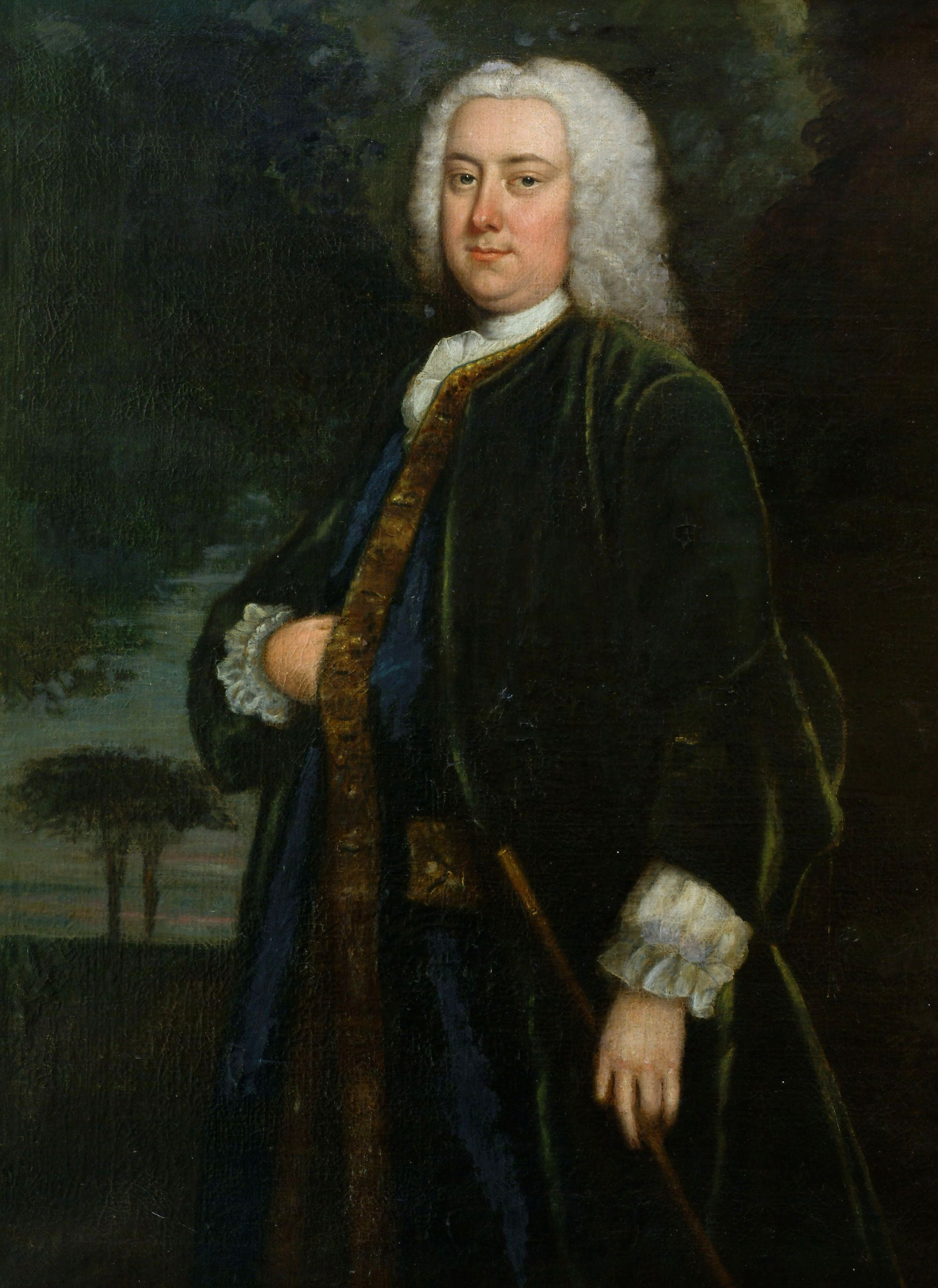
Arthur Tremayne of Sydenham, 1700-1798, painting attributed to Thomas Hudson

Arthur Tremayne (23 Feb. 1701–1796), of Sydenham, Devon, was a British Tory politician who sat in the House of Commons from 1727 to 1734.

Tremayne was the only son of Arthur Tremayne of Sydenham and his wife Grace Tynte, daughter of Sir Halswell Tynte, 1st Baronet MP of Halswell, Somerset. In 1709 he succeeded his father at Sydenham and also his great grandfather at Collacombe from whom he inherited a very large fortune. He was educated at Westminster School in 1715 and was admitted at Trinity College, Cambridge on 29 May 1719. He married Dorothy Hammond of Wiltshire.

Tremayne was a friend of the Morices of Werrington, and it was probably they who returned him as Tory Member of Parliament for Launceston at the 1727 British general election. He voted against the Government in every recorded division. He did not stand at the 1734 British general election. He was High Sheriff of Devon for the year 1739 to 1740.

Tremayne died at an advanced age in 1796 leaving one son.

Parliament of Great Britain
Preceded by John Freind; Henry Vane	Member of Parliament for Launceston; 1727 – 1734; With: Hon. John King	Succeeded by Hon. John King; Sir William Morice
