= East Down, Devon =

Village and civil parish in Devon, England

East Down
- Village
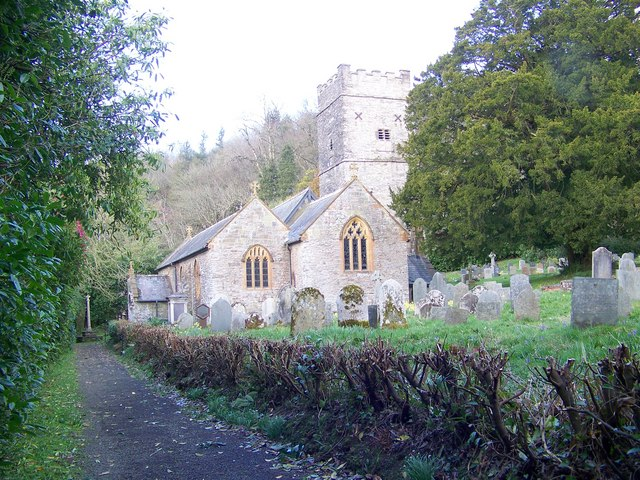
- St John the Baptist Church

- Location within Devon Location within the United Kingdom
- Coordinates: 51°9′31″N 4°0′4″W
- Country: England
- County: Devon
- District: North Devon
- Civil parish: East Down
- Time zone: UTC+0:00 (GST)

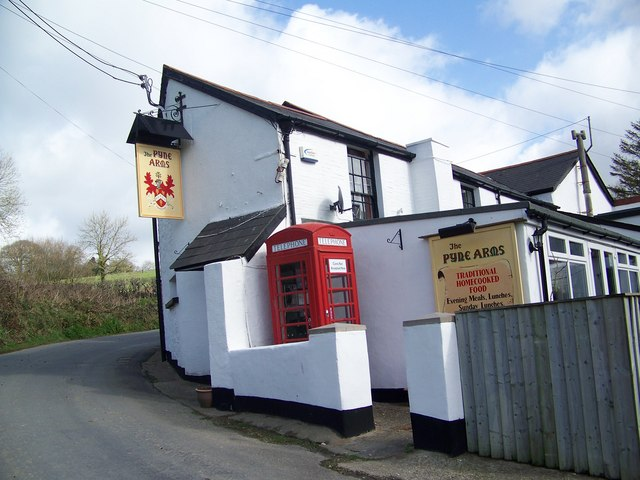
The Pyne Arms

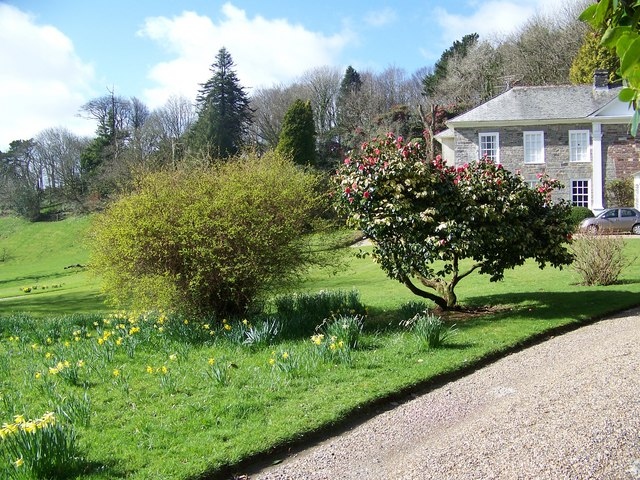
The Manor House

East Down is a village and civil parish in the North Devon district of Devon, England. It includes the hamlets of Churchill, Shortacombe, Brockham and Clifton. The parish contains a church, pub and manor house.

== Historic estates ==
The estate of Northcote was listed in the Domesday Book of 1086 and was the earliest known seat of the de Northcote family which became Northcote Baronets in 1641, by which time they had moved to Hayne, in the parish of Newton St Cyres, and were created Earls of Iddesleigh in 1885, by which time they were seated at Upton Pyne. The Heraldic Visitations of Devon lists the founder of the family as Galfridus de Northcote, Miles ("knight"), living in 1103. The family later in the 16th century made its fortune as cloth merchants at Crediton.
