= John Belfield =

British lawyer and Tory politician

John Belfield (21 December 1669 – 1751), of Primley Hill, Paignton, and Exeter, Devon, was a British lawyer and Tory politician who sat in the House of Commons from 1728 to 1734.

Belfield was the second son of Allen Belfield, barrister of Lower Knoll, Rattery, near Totnes, Devon, and his wife Mary Savory. He matriculated at Oriel College, Oxford in 1688. He was admitted at Inner Temple and was called to the bar in May 1695. He married. Jaquetta Finney, daughter of Samuel Finney, rector of Exbourne, and acquired Primley Hill on the marriage.

Belfield was appointed deputy recorder of Totnes in 1700. He became a freeman of Exeter in 1711 and was appointed serjeant at law 1716. He was returned as a Tory Member of Parliament for Exeter at a by-election on 25 May 1728 and voted consistently against the Government. He was elected recorder of Exeter on 21 September 1728. At the 1734 British general election, he lost his seat and did not stand again. As recorder of Exeter, he signed a loyal address during the rebellion in 1745.

Belfield was overturned in his coach on 19 October 1751 and died from his injuries the following day. He left a son, Finney, and two daughters.

Parliament of Great Britain
Preceded by Samuel Molyneux; Francis Drewe	Member of Parliament for Exeter; British general election 1728–1734; With: Francis Drewe	Succeeded by John King; Thomas Balle
