= Churchill, North Devon =

Village in North Devon, England

Coordinates: 51°08′55″N 4°00′35″W

Churchill
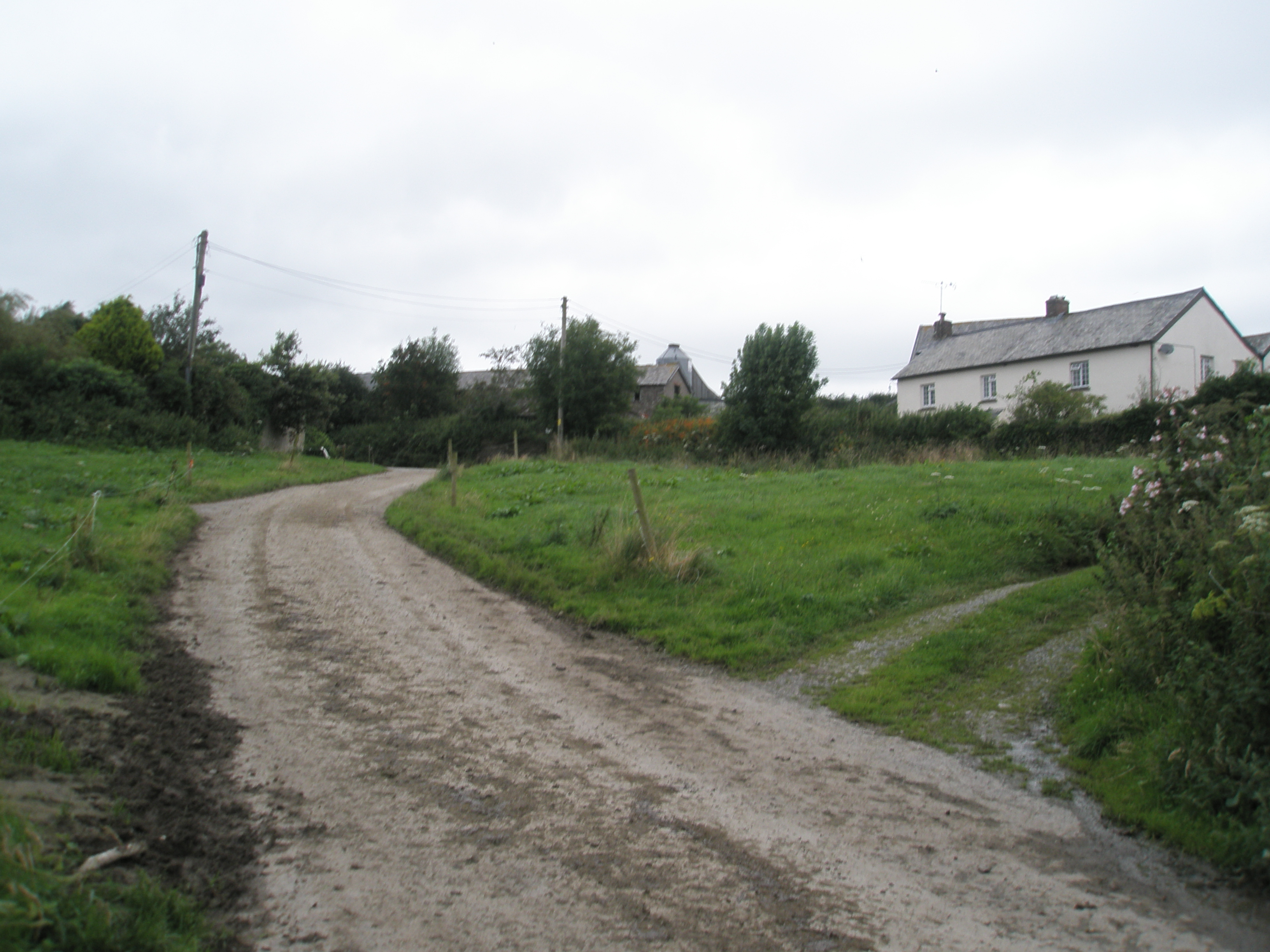

- Location within Devon
- Civil parish: East Down
- District: North Devon
- Shire county: Devon
- Region: South West
- Country: England
- Sovereign state: United Kingdom
- Police: Devon and Cornwall
- Fire: Devon and Somerset
- Ambulance: South Western

Churchill is a hamlet in the civil parish of East Down, in the North Devon district, in Devon, England, and is located near the village of East Down, as well as the town of Barnstaple.

== In Media ==
The author Nancy Phelan describes her time in the area in The Swift Foot in Time.
