= John King, 2nd Baron King =

English politician

John King, 2nd Baron King, FRS (13 January 1706 – 10 February 1740) was an English politician.

== Biography ==
King was born in London in 1706, the son of Peter King, 1st Baron King, the future Lord Chancellor. He attended Clare College at Cambridge University, and was awarded his M.A. in 1723. He was Member of Parliament for Launceston from 1727 to 1734 and for Exeter from 1734 until he succeeded to the peerage in 1735. He was made Out-ranger of Windsor Forest in 1726. He married Elizabeth, the daughter of Robert Fry, Esq., of Devon: they had no issue. King died in 1740 on a journey to Lisbon. He was succeeded by his brother Peter King, 3rd Baron King.

Parliament of Great Britain
Preceded by Henry Vane; John Freind	Member of Parliament for Launceston; 1727–1734; With: Arthur Tremayne 1727–1734; Sir William Morice 1734	Succeeded by Arthur Tremayne; Sir William Morice
Preceded by Francis Drewe; John Belfield	Member of Parliament for Exeter; 1734; With: Thomas Balle	Succeeded by Thomas Balle; Henry Northcote
Political offices
Preceded by Richard Munden	Out-Ranger of Windsor Forest; 1726–1740	Succeeded by The Lord King
Peerage of Great Britain
Preceded by Peter King	Baron King; 1734–1740	Succeeded by Peter King
