= Upton Pyne apple =

Apple cultivar

Malus pumila 'Upton Pyne'
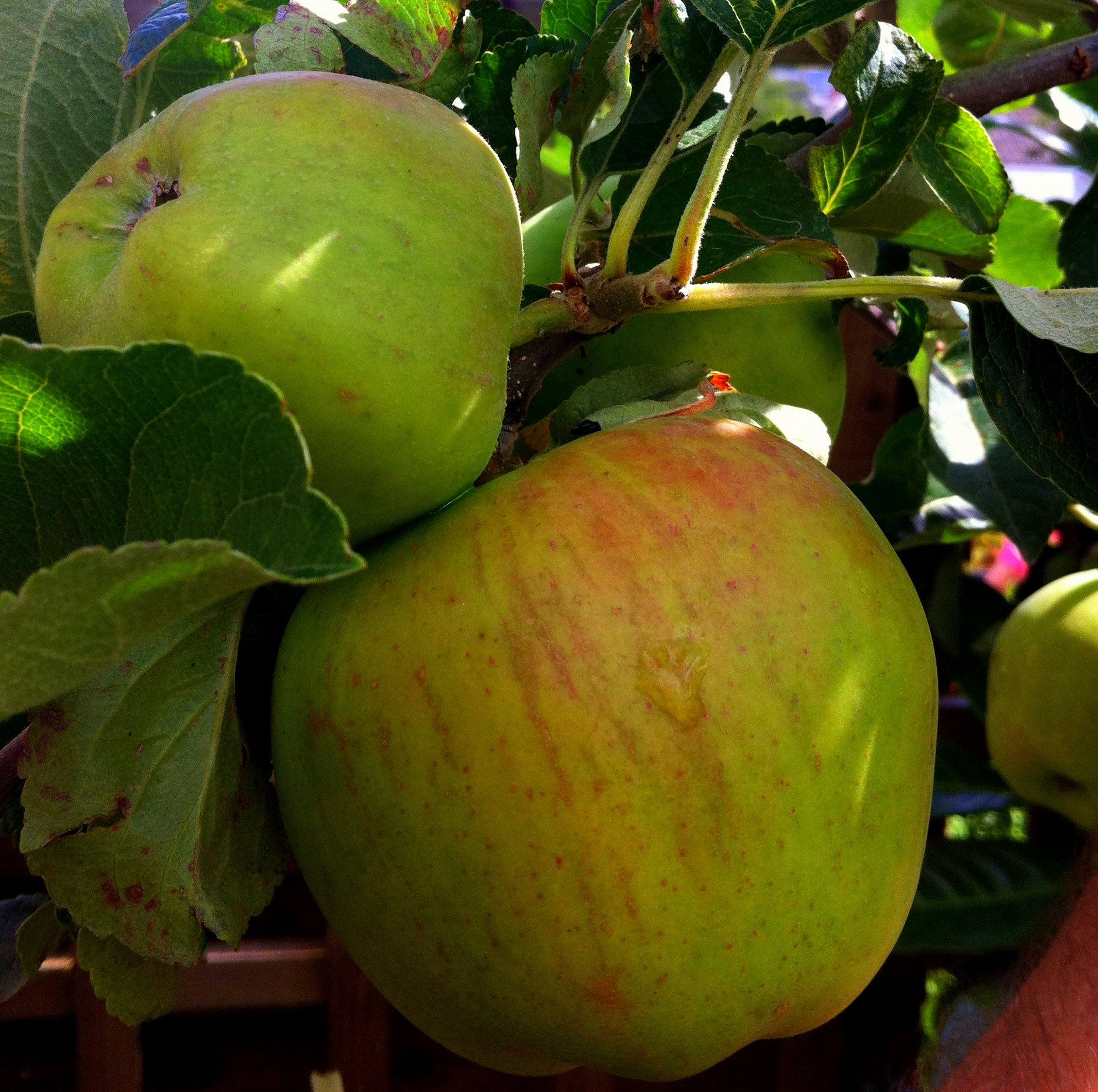
- Species: Malus pumila
- Cultivar: 'Upton Pyne'
- Breeder: George Pyne
- Origin: Topsham Devon 1910

The Upton Pyne apple is a large cooking variety (also used as an eating apple) noted for its pineapple flavour. In season December to March.

It was introduced in 1910 and raised by George Pyne the owner of Denver Nurseries in Topsham Devon UK. The apple was named after the village of Upton Pyne in Devon UK where his family originated.

In 1933 specimens were exhibited at the Royal Horticultural Society.
