= Thomas Balle =

British politician

Member of the Great Britain Parliament for Exeter
- In office 1734–1741 Serving with John King (Note: Served from 1734-1735); Sir Henry Northcote (Note: Served from 1735-1741)
- Preceded by: John Belfield; Francis Drewe
- Succeeded by: Humphrey Sydenham; Sir Henry Northcote

Personal details
- Born: 1671
- Died: 1749 (aged 77–78)

Thomas Balle (1671-1749) was a British politician who served as the Member of Parliament for Exeter from 1734 to 1741.
