= Stafford Northcote, 4th Earl of Iddesleigh =

The Right Honourable Stafford Northcote, 4th Earl of Iddesleigh
- Earl of Iddesleigh
- Coat of arms
- Tenure: 1970 – 2004
- Predecessor: Henry Stafford Northcote, 3rd Earl of Iddesleigh
- Successor: John Stafford Northcote, 5th Earl of Iddesleigh
- Born: 14 July 1932
- Died: 8 July 2004 (aged 71)
- Spouse: María Luisa Álvarez-Builla y Urquijo (m. 1955)
- Issue: John Stafford Northcote, 5th Earl of Iddesleigh; Lady Mary Louise Northcote
- Father: Henry Stafford Northcote, 3rd Earl of Iddesleigh
- Mother: Elizabeth Susan Angela Mary Lowndes

Stafford Henry Northcote, 4th Earl of Iddesleigh (14 July 1932 – 8 July 2004), styled Viscount St Cyres until 1970, was a British peer, a member of the House of Lords from 1970 to November 1999, when the House of Lords Act 1999 came into effect.

He was the eldest son of Henry Northcote, 3rd Earl of Iddesleigh, and his wife, Elizabeth Susan Angela Mary Lowndes, and the grandson of the Reverend John Stafford Northcote, a younger son of Stafford Northcote, 1st Earl of Iddesleigh. Educated at Downside School, Northcote succeeded his father in his peerages and a baronetcy in 1970.

On 20 July 1955, Iddesleigh married María Luisa Álvarez-Builla y Urquijo, (1934–2023), daughter of Gonzalo Álvarez-Builla y Alvera and María Luisa de Urquijo y Losada, daughter of Luis Cayetano de Urquijo y Ussía, 1st Marquess of Amurrio, and María Teresa Losada y González de Villalaz, 5th Marchioness of Otero, and stepdaughter of Sir Pownoll Irving Edward Pellew, 9th Viscount Exmouth. They had two children, John Stafford Northcote, 5th Earl of Iddesleigh (born 1957) and Lady Mary Louise Northcote (born 1959).

== Styles of address ==
- 1932–1970: Viscount St Cyres
- 1970–2004: The Right Honourable the Earl of Iddesleigh
