= Pynes House =

Historic house in Devon, England

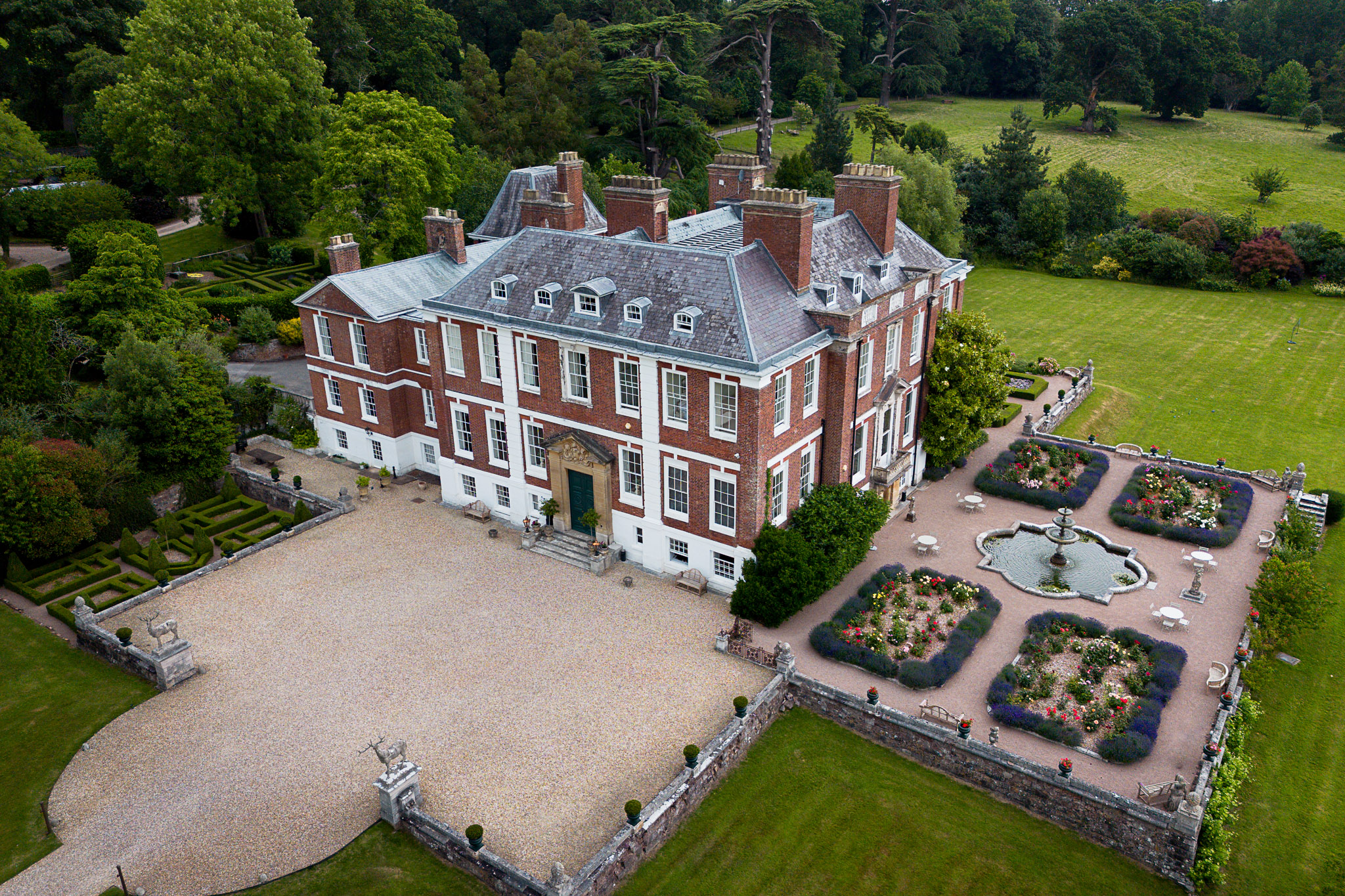
- Pynes House

- Location within Devon

General information
- Architectural style: Queen Anne
- Location: Upton Pyne, Devon, England
- Coordinates: 50.756104°N 3.540979°W
- Completed: c. 1700–1725

Technical details
- Size: 21,000 square feet (2,000 m^{2})

Pynes House is a Grade II* listed Queen Anne style country house built by Hugh Stafford between around 1700 and 1725, situated in the parish of Upton Pyne, Devon, 3 miles northwest of Exeter. It was the manor house for the Manor of Upton Pyne, which included the village of Upton Pyne.

== Description ==
The house has four storeys and covers 21,000 square feet (2,000 m^{2}). Its present owners run the house as a wedding and events venue, offering 12 bedrooms. It is set in gardens and grounds of 37 acres. The building is primarily made of bricks to a square plan, with Portland stone dressings. The principal roof is slate, with four large brick chimney stacks.

== History ==
The manor of Upton Pyne was held by the Pyne family for ten generations from the time of King Henry I, following which it passed through the Larder (which held it for another five generations), Copleston and Stafford families and finally the Northcote family in 1732. This 1732 transfer occurred when it passed to the Northcote family on the marriage of the heiress of Hugh Stafford to Sir Henry Northcote, 5th Baronet. Following his marriage Northcote abandoned the family seat of Hayne, which sank to the status of a farmhouse, and moved to Pynes House.

Renovations at the house in 1789 inspired Sebastian Emmett to write the poem Written on Viewing the Improvements at Pynes-House, the Seat of Sir Stafford Henry Northcote, Bart. Near Exeter. 1789, which talks about the house and the design of the gardens, but also alludes to the character of the nation at the time.

An 1827 account relates that "Pynes House contains some valuable pictures, particularly a fine Van Dyke, in the eating-room, and several excellent family portraits".

The building was enlarged in 1851 by the statesman Sir Stafford Northcote, 8th Baronet, who was created 1st Earl of Iddesleigh by Queen Victoria in 1885.

Walter Stafford Northcote, 2nd Earl of Iddesleigh claimed that Pynes House was the inspiration for Barton Park, which features in Jane Austen's Sense and Sensibility.

The Earl of Iddesleigh sold Pynes in 1998.
