= William Northcote =

British naval surgeon

- Occupation: Naval surgeon

William Northcote (died 1783?) was a British naval surgeon.

== Biography ==
Northcote passed on 20 October 1757 an examination for naval surgeons at the Surgeons' Company in London, and was declared to be fit to act as `second mate to a fourth rate.' On 18 October 1759 his name again appears as having been examined and ‘found fit to act as first mate to a first rate.’ He never became a member of the company, but on 8 February 1771 he was certified by the Surgeons' Company to be ‘qualified to act as surgeon to a first rate.’ His first warrant is dated 11 February 1771, and he is said to have served in the Dublin. His professional works, compiled for the guidance of naval surgeons, show that he was engaged on active service in all parts of the world, and he professed to be specially conversant with the treatment of diseases occurring in tropical countries. He is marked as dead in the admiralty list for 1783.

Northcote's writings are of little medical interest, as he does not cite cases, and rarely describes any of his own methods of treatment. Their titles are:

- ‘The Marine Practice of Physic and Surgery,’ in two vols. London, 1770. This is Northcote's chief work; and it exhibits, in the rare instances of allusion to his personal experiences, descriptive powers of a high order. The preface is dated from Cornwall 12 June 1769. The most interesting part of the work is an appendix containing ‘Some brief Directions to be observed by the Sea Surgeon previous to and in an Engagement,’ in which the author related in a most graphic manner the difficulties attending the practice of his art at sea when the ship was under fire.
- ‘The Anatomy of the Human Body, for the Use of Naval Practitioners,’ London, 1772.
- ‘A Concise History of Anatomy,’ London, 1772. * ‘Methodus Prescribendi,’ London, 1772—a copy of the pharmacopœias of the London, Edinburgh, Paris, and St. Petersburg Hospitals, with the formulæ in use in the English and Russian fleets, and in the British army.
