= James Northcote (disambiguation) =

James Northcote may refer to:

- James Northcote (1746–1841), English painter
- James Northcote (actor) (born 1981), English actor
- James Spencer Northcote (1821–1907), English Catholic priest and writer
