= Newton St Cyres =

Village in Devon, England

Coordinates: 50.768°N 3.592°W

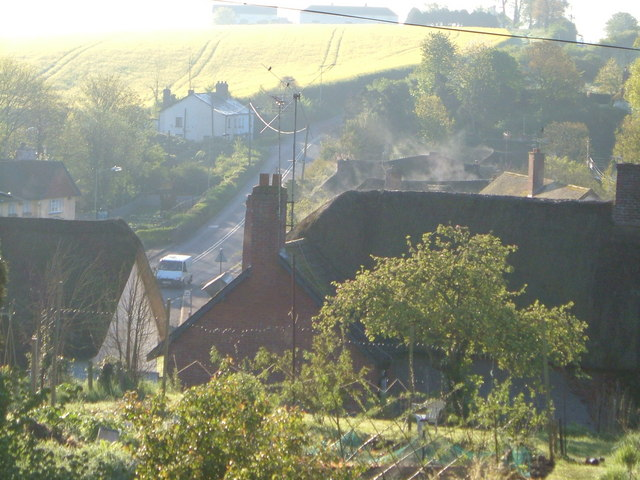
- Newton St Cyres

- Location within Devon
- Population: 562 (2011)
- OS grid reference: SX8897
- Civil parish: Newton St Cyres
- District: Mid Devon
- Shire county: Devon
- Region: South West
- Country: England
- Sovereign state: United Kingdom
- Post town: EXETER
- Postcode district: EX5
- Dialling code: 01392
- Police: Devon and Cornwall
- Fire: Devon and Somerset
- Ambulance: South Western
- UK Parliament: Central Devon

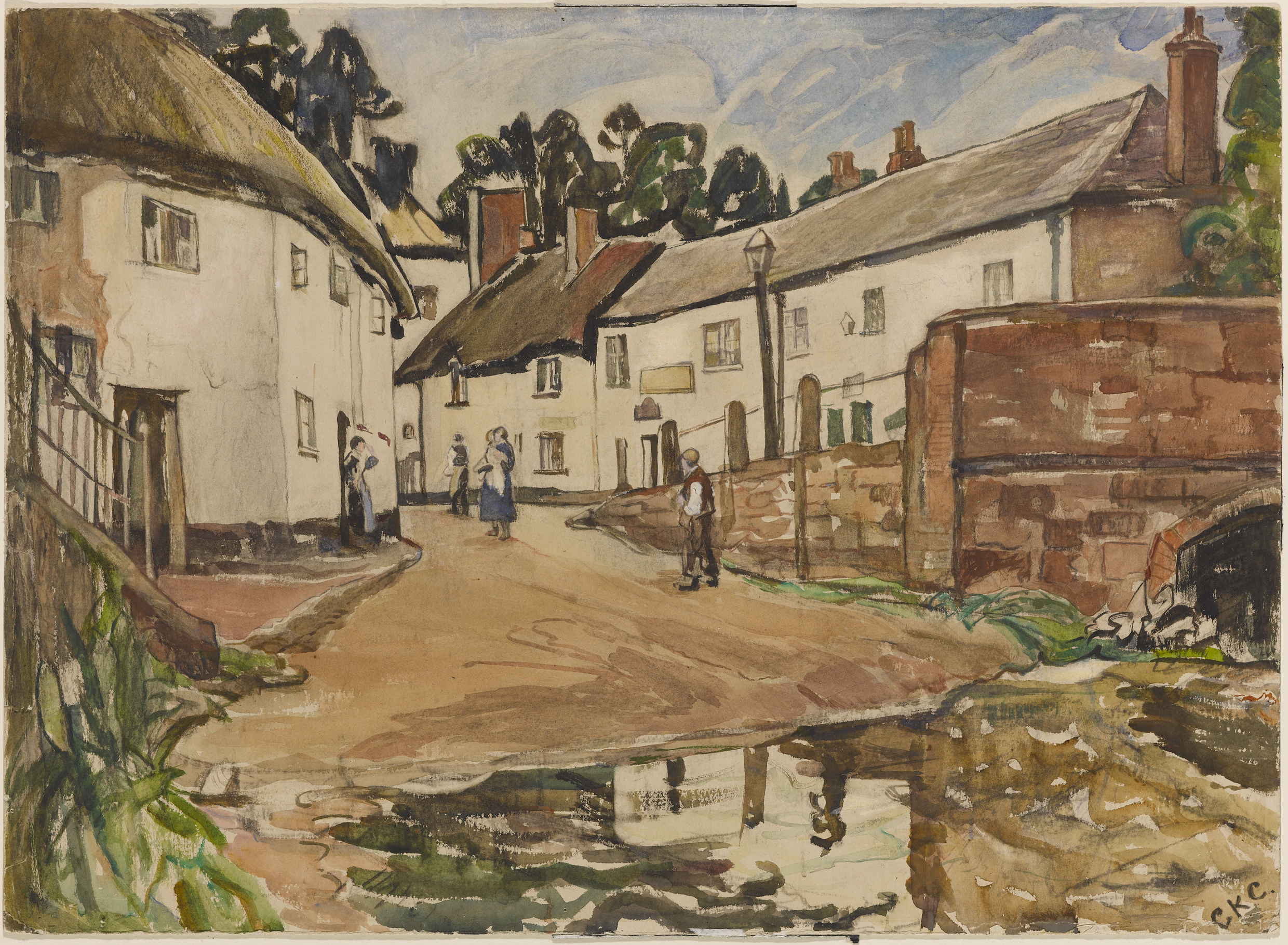
A painting of Newton St Cyres painted between 1933 and 1935 by Cecily K Carlyon

Newton St Cyres (/ˈsaɪərz/, like "sires") is a village, civil parish former manor and former ecclesiastical parish in Mid Devon, in the English county of Devon, located between Crediton and Exeter. It had a population of 562 at the 2011 census. The village is part of the Newbrooke electoral ward. The ward population at the above census was 1,520. Almost destroyed by fire in the early 1960s, its main point of interest is the Parish Church, built in the 15th century and dedicated to the martyrs St. Cyriac and his mother St. Julitta. Most of the church is in early Perpendicular style, built of local reddish 'trap', a volcanic stone from quarries at Posbury, with the exception of the nave pillars, which are of Beer stone. It contains the monument with standing effigy of John Northcote (1570–1632) of Hayne, lord of the manor of Newton St Cyres. Newton St Cyres railway station is on the Tarka Line from Exeter to Barnstaple and the Dartmoor Line from Exeter to Okehampton, but is located approximately 0.5 miles outside the village centre, and receives an infrequent service.

The village has a recreation ground with two football pitches, a cricket pitch and two tennis courts.

== Historic estates ==
The manor of Newton St Cyres was briefly the property of Jacques Granado, a Flemish knight at the Tudor court. The parish of Newton St Cyres contains various historic estates including:

- Newton House, built circa 1770 by John VI Quicke (1724–1776), (i.e. "the 6th"), Sheriff of Devon in 1757, whose monument survives in the parish church of St Cyr and St Julitta, Newton St Cyres. In 1810, his son John Quicke VII (1759–1830) of Newton House, was lord of the manor of Newton St Cyres. The location of the house was marred by the presence of the busy main-road between Crediton and Exeter, which passed almost next to the house and separated it from the parish church. To ameliorate the situation, at some time before 1797, John VII Quicke employed soldiers returning from the Napoleonic Wars to lower the road by digging out a 50-foot deep cutting, over which he built a private footbridge linking his house with the church yard. Thus the house now appears sited at the edge of a cliff, as is illustrated in a 1797 watercolour by Rev. John Swete. The house burned down in 1906, but was rebuilt in 1909. It was converted into flats and sold by the Quicke family, which in 1967 had abandoned it in favour of nearby Sherwood within the same parish.
- Sherwood House, built in 1918 by Adrian Cave, to the design of his cousin the architect Walter Cave of Sidbury, in the Arts and Crafts style. It was occupied by the Quicke family, which had abandoned nearby Newton House, from 1967 until its sale in February 2017. The business known as Quicke's Cheeses was established by John X Quicke (i.e.the 10th), using milk from the 2,400 acre estate in the parish still owned by his family. He served as chairman of the Ministry of Agriculture's Regional Board 1972–5.
- Hayne, ancient seat of the Northcote family, in 1885 elevated to the peerage as Viscount St Cyres of Newton St Cyres and Earl of Iddesleigh. The house had been demolished by 1797, to be replaced by a farmhouse, Hayne Barton, and the Northcotes moved to Pynes House in the parish of Upton Pyne, Devon, but that was sold in 1998, and by 2003 the present head of the family, John Stafford Northcote, 5th Earl of Iddesleigh, had returned to live at Hayne Barton.
