= Earl of Iddesleigh =

Title in the Peerage of the United Kingdom

Earldom of Iddesleigh
- Arms of Northcote: Argent, three crosses crosslet in bend sable. Crest: On a chapeau gules turned up Ermine a stag trippant argent. Supporters: On either side a stag proper suspended from the neck by a chain or an escutcheon ermine charged with a pine cone or.
- Creation date: 3 July 1885
- Created by: Queen Victoria
- Peerage: Peerage of the United Kingdom
- First holder: Stafford Northcote, 1st Earl of Iddesleigh
- Present holder: John Northcote, 5th Earl of Iddesleigh
- Heir apparent: Thomas Northcote, Viscount St Cyres
- Remainder to: the 1st Earl's heirs male of the body lawfully begotten
- Subsidiary titles: Viscount St Cyres
- Status: Extant
- Motto: CHRISTI CRUX EST MEA LUX (The Cross of Christ is my light)

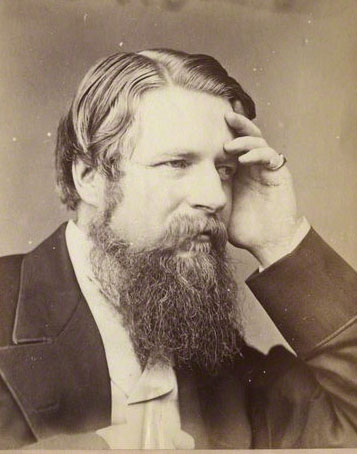
Stafford Henry Northcote, 1st Earl of Iddesleigh

Earl of Iddesleigh (/ˈɪdzliː/ IDZ-lee), in the County of Devon, is a title in the Peerage of the United Kingdom. It was created in 1885 for the Conservative politician Sir Stafford Northcote, 8th Baronet, of Pynes in the parish of Upton Pyne near Exeter in Devon and lord of the manor of Iddesleigh, 28 miles north-west of Pynes. He served as President of the Board of Trade, Secretary of State for India, Chancellor of the Exchequer, First Lord of the Treasury and Foreign Secretary and was Joint Leader of the Conservative Party from 1881 to 1885. Northcote was made Viscount St Cyres, of Newton Saint Cyres in the County of Devon, at the same time he was given the earldom. This title is also in the Peerage of the United Kingdom.

He was succeeded by his eldest son, the second Earl. He notably served as Chairman of the Board of Inland Revenue, and a Justice of the peace and deputy lieutenant in Devonshire. On his death the titles passed to his nephew, the third Earl. He was the youngest son of John Stafford Northcote, third son of the first Earl. His eldest son, the fourth Earl, served as a Deputy Lieutenant of Devon. As of 2017 the titles are held by the latter's only son, the fifth Earl, who succeeded in 2004.

The Northcote Baronetcy, of Haynes in the County of Devon, was created in the Baronetage of England in 1641 for John Northcote. He represented Ashburton, Devon and Barnstaple in the House of Commons. His grandson, the third Baronet (who succeeded his father), died childless in 1709 and was succeeded by his younger brother, the fourth Baronet. He was a Medical Doctor. His son, the fifth Baronet, sat as Member of Parliament for Exeter. His great-great-grandson was the aforementioned eighth Baronet, who was elevated to the peerage in 1885.

Two other members of the Northcote family have also gained distinction. Henry Northcote, second son of the first Earl, was created Baron Northcote in 1899 and served as Governor-General of Australia from 1904 to 1908. Sir Geoffry Northcote, Governor of Hong Kong from 1937 to 1941, was the son of Arthur Francis Northcote, fourth son of the first Earl.

The title of the earldom is pronounced "Id-sly" while the family surname is pronounced "Northcut".

The family seat is Shillands House, near Exeter, Devon.

== Northcote Baronets, of Hayne (1641) ==
- Sir John Northcote, 1st Baronet (1600–1676)
- Sir Arthur Northcote, 2nd Baronet (1628–1688)
- Sir Francis Northcote, 3rd Baronet (1659–1709)
- Sir Henry Northcote, 4th Baronet (1667–1730)
- Sir Henry Northcote, 5th Baronet (1710–1743)
- Sir Stafford Northcote, 6th Baronet (1736–1770)
- Sir Stafford Henry Northcote, 7th Baronet (1762–1851)
- Sir Stafford Henry Northcote, 8th Baronet (1818–1887) (created Earl of Iddesleigh in 1885)

== Earls of Iddesleigh (1885) ==
- Stafford Henry Northcote, 1st Earl of Iddesleigh (1818–1887)
- Walter Stafford Northcote, 2nd Earl of Iddesleigh (1845–1927)
  - Stafford Harry Northcote, Viscount Saint Cyres (1869–1926), predeceased his father
- Henry Stafford Northcote, 3rd Earl of Iddesleigh (1901–1970)
- Stafford Henry Northcote, 4th Earl of Iddesleigh (1932–2004)
- John Stafford Northcote, 5th Earl of Iddesleigh (b. 1957)

== Present Earl ==
The present holder of the peerages is John Stafford Northcote, 5th Earl of Iddesleigh (born 15 February 1957). The only son of the 4th Earl and his wife Maria Luisa Alvarez-Builla y Urquijo, Condesa del Real Agrado, he was educated at Downside School and the Royal Agricultural College and was styled as Viscount St Cyres between 1970 and 2004. On 14 May 1983, he married firstly Fiona Caroline Elizabeth Wakefield, a daughter of Paul A. C. Wakefield. They were divorced in 1999, and on 9 June 2000 he married secondly Maria Ann Akaylar Lakin, daughter of John Lakin. With his first wife he has two children:

- Thomas Stafford Northcote, Viscount St Cyres (born 1985), the heir apparent; and
- Lady Elizabeth Rose Adèle Northcote (born 1989)

In 2003, Lord St Cyres was living at Hayne Barton, Newton St Cyres. On 8 July 2004, he succeeded to the peerages and the baronetcy.

== Line of succession ==
Line of succession (simplified)
- Henry Stafford Northcote, 3rd Earl of Iddesleigh (1901–1970)
  - Stafford Henry Northcote, 4th Earl of Iddesleigh (1932–2004)
    - John Stafford Northcote, 5th Earl of Iddesleigh (b. 1957)
      - (1) Thomas Stafford Northcote, Viscount Saint Cyres (b. 1985)
  - Edward Frederic Northcote (1934–2006)
    - (2) Edward Bede Robert Hornby Northcote (b. 1964)
      - (3) Robert Henry Basil Northcote (b. 2000)
    - (4) Alexander Benet Paul Hornby Northcote (b. 1971)
      - (5) Anthony Theodore Robert Michael Northcote (b. 2004)

There are further heirs in remainder to the baronetcy descended from previous baronets.

== See ==
- Baron Northcote
