= Northcote baronets =

Set index for Northcote baronets

There have been two baronetcies created for members of the Northcote family, one in the Baronetage of England and one in the Baronetage of the United Kingdom. As of 2026 one creation is extant.

- Northcote baronets of Hayne (1641): see Earl of Iddesleigh
- Northcote baronets of Seamore Place (1887): see Baron Northcote
