= Upton Pyne =

Village in Devon, England

Coordinates: 50°46′07″N 3°32′46″W

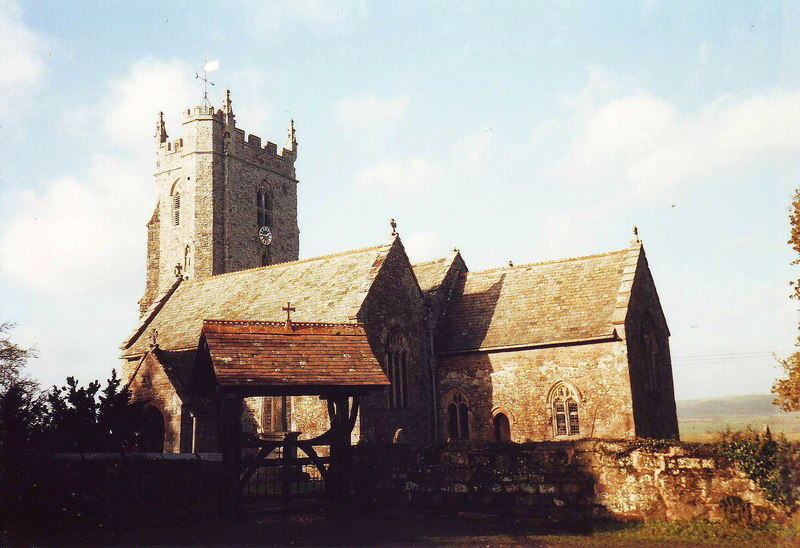
Upton Pyne Church

Upton Pyne is a parish and village in Devon, England. The parish lies just north west of Exeter, mainly between the River Exe and River Creedy. The village is located north of Cowley and west of Brampford Speke and Stoke Canon. At the 2021 census, it had a population of 540, which was slightly more than the 483 recorded at the 2011 census.

== Notable resident ==
- John Walker, author of The Sufferings of the Clergy, was rector of the church 1720–47, and is buried on the north side of the churchyard.

== See also ==
- Upton Pyne apple

== Sources ==
- (Google Maps)
