= George Rolle =

Member of the Parliament of England

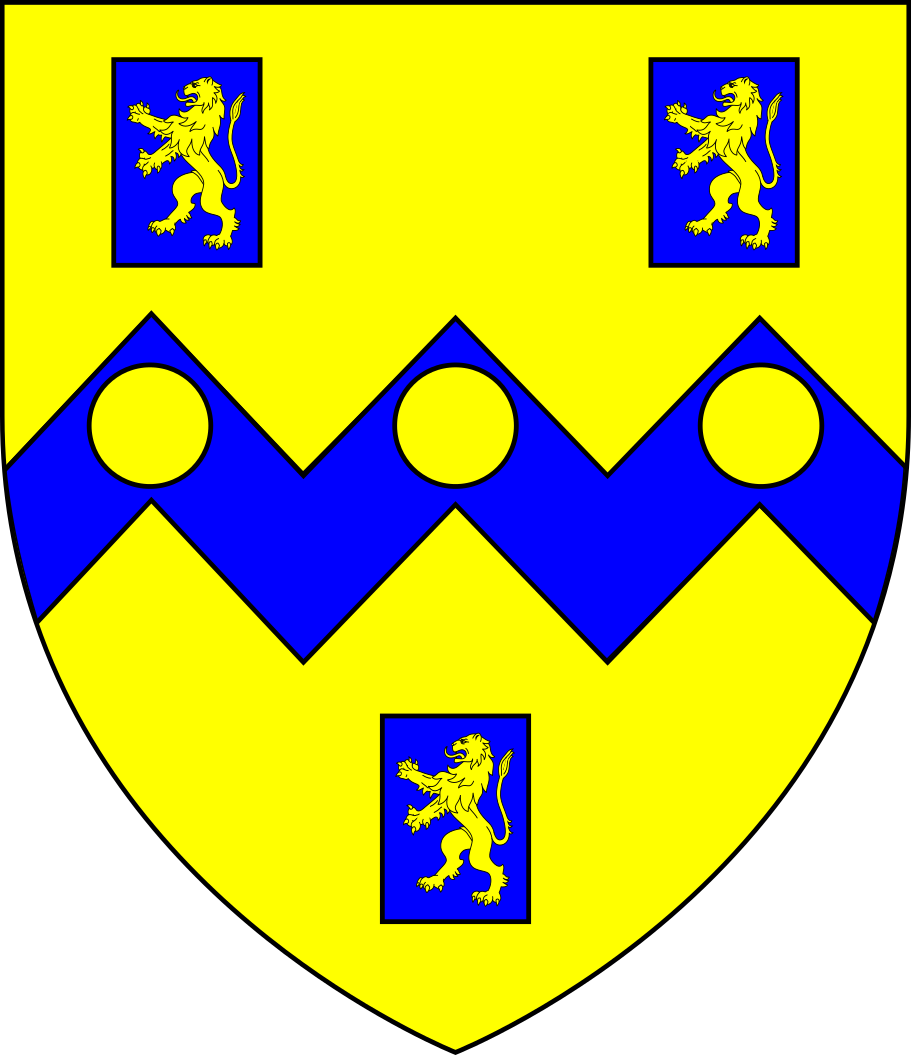
Arms of Rolle: Or, on a fesse dancetté between three billets azure each charged with a lion rampant of the first three bezants

George Rolle (c. 1486 – 20 November 1552) of Stevenstone in the parish of St Giles in the Wood near Great Torrington in Devon, was the founder of the wealthy, influential and widespread Rolle family of Devon, who by 1842 had become the largest landowners in Devon with about 55,000 acres according to the Return of Owners of Land, 1873 in the person of Hon. Mark Rolle (died 1907), the adoptive heir of John Rolle, 1st Baron Rolle (died 1842). (Note: Rolle family landholdings quantified in the Return of Owners of Land, 1873.) He was a Dorset-born London lawyer who in 1507 became Keeper of the Records of the Court of Common Pleas and was elected as a Member of Parliament for Barnstaple in 1542 and 1545. He became the steward of Dunkeswell Abbey in Devon, and following the Dissolution of the Monasteries he purchased much ex-monastic land in Devon. Not only was he the founder of his own great Devonshire landowning dynasty but he was also an ancestor of others almost as great, including the Acland baronets of Killerton, (Note: His daughter Elizabeth Rolle married Robert Mallet of Woolleigh whose descendant and eventual heiress Eleanor Mallet was the mother of Sir John Acland, 1st Baronet (1591–1647)) the Wrey Baronets (Note: Sir Bourchier Wrey, 4th Baronet (1653–1696) married Florence Rolle, a daughter of Sir John Rolle (died 1706) of Stevenstone) of Tawstock and the Trefusis family of Trefusis in Cornwall now of Heanton Satchville, Huish, later Baron Clinton, heirs both of Rolle of Heanton Satchville, Petrockstowe and of Rolle of Stevenstone.

== Origins ==
George Rolle's place of birth is unknown, but he is known to have been related to Thomas Rolle (died 1525) who had been born at Wimborne Minster in Dorset and whose uncle was William Rolle, parson of Witchampton in Dorset. (Note: The National Archives holds the following conveyance deed of 1589(D/GLY:A/1 1589) summarised as: "John Dewye of Mapperton, yeoman, and Wm. Rolles of Wimborne Minster, yeoman, to Giles Stagge of Ashton, yeoman: release of manor of Little Hinton alias Stanbridge and advowson of Stanbridge". The family seem to have been especially connected with the estate of Holt.) (Note: "At the Manor House, which may be dated as not earlier than 1520, the president read a few notes prepared by Miss Williams, who had recently lived there. The dining-room, kitchen, pantry, and another small room, with the chambers over them, were the only surviving portions of the old structure, the other part having been added about 38 years ago. Over a small window are the letters W. R., which stand for William Rolle; when the house was enlarged a worn stone reading, "Pray for the soule", was removed from between the two letters. (The rector in 1505 was Walter Rolle.) The oak mantelpiece and the panelling are Jacobean; the latter had been covered with white paint, which was scraped off by Mrs. Williams") Both George Rolle and William Rolle were joint-remaindermen in the will of Thomas Rolle (died 1525).

== Career ==
Keeper of Common Bench Records (Tenure of Office) Act 1523
- Act of Parliament
- Parliament of England
- Long title: An Act that George Roll clerk, and keeper of the King's records of the common bench at Westminster, shall hold his place during life.
- Citation: 14 & 15 Hen. 8. c. 35
- Territorial extent: England and Wales

Dates
- Royal assent: 13 August 1523
- Commencement: 15 April 1523 (Note: Start of session.)
- Repealed: 30 July 1948
Other legislation
Repealed by	Statute Law Revision Act 1948

Status: Repealed

Text of statute as originally enacted

The place of his education and legal training is unknown, but by 1507 he had become Keeper of the Records of the Court of Common Pleas, of which office in 1523 by means of an act of Parliament, the Keeper of Common Bench Records (Tenure of Office) Act 1523 (14 & 15 Hen. 8. c. 35), which mentioned his "long, good and perfect knowledge and experience" he acquired a life tenure. His patron during his early legal career appears to have been Sir Robert Brudenell (1461–1531), Chief Justice of the Common Pleas from 1521. In 1545 he became a JP for Devon and the bailiff of the Hundred of Stratton in Cornwall, part of the Duchy of Cornwall.

=== Work for Viscount Lisle ===
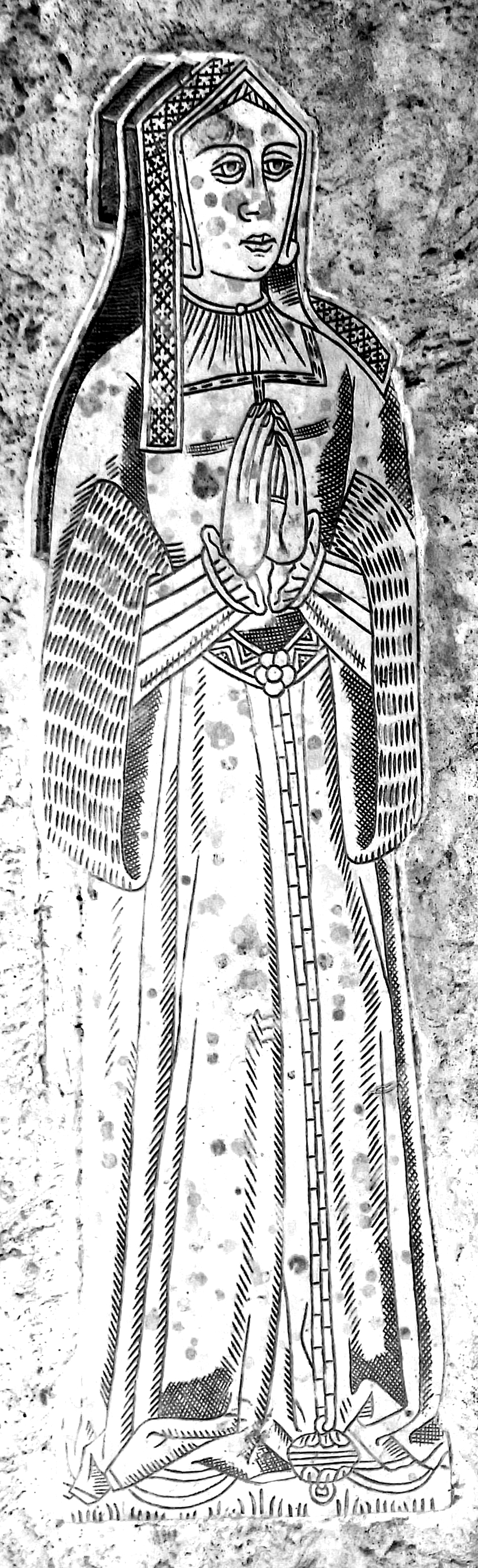
Monumental brass of Honor Plantagenet, Viscountess Lisle (died 1566) one of a group of nine purchased by George Rolle, of which eight survive on the chest-tomb of Sir John Basset (1462–1529) in Atherington Church. (Note: This brass and its eight companion pieces were ordered by Honor Grenville herself, made in 1533, purchased by George Rolle before July 1534 and set onto the tomb in 1534, as correspondence to Honor surviving in the Lisle Letters reveals. The Lisle Letters record some details concerning the making of the tomb. Lady Lisle ordered "images & scripture...for Mt Basset's tomb" before she departed for Calais to join her new husband Lord Lisle, and a letter from Richard Kyrton to Lady Lisle dated 21 November 1533 states: "And as for your plates for the tomb, they are sent home by the carrier, and for the gilding they must descry all the arms by the reason of colours. And they asketh £ v for the doing of it and for the making Master George Rolles hath laid out xxxiii s iiii d unto Candlemas, the which Burye then must pay him". In a letter dated April 1534 Sir John Bonde wrote to Lady Lisle "the pictures of Mr Basset's tomb" have been "laid on by the hands of Oliver Tomlyng". Thus the brasses were made in 1533 and set onto the tomb in 1534.)

He gained many prominent private clients including Arthur Plantagenet, 1st Viscount Lisle (died 1542) whom he served until the latter's death, and whose wife Honor Grenville was from North Devon and whose Devonshire home was at Umberleigh (the seat of her first husband Sir John Basset (1462–1529)) not far from Stevenstone. He recruited to Lisle's assistance, especially in his purchase of Frithelstock Priory, Richard Pollard (died 1542), General Surveyor of the Court of Augmentations, his fellow North Devonian lawyer and speculator in monastic lands. He wrote from London to Lady Lisle on 22 December 1536:

"I have sued with your...servant Husee, who right diligently doth apply your business here, to the Chancellor of Augmentations with whom I have often been about the same, and have at this day appointed you the best and most profitable lands belonging to the said late priory, with much pain and suit, wherein we have found Mr Chancellor of Augmentations and Mr Onley both good, which have both deserved your thanks".

He had just received his wish from the Lisles of being appointed their surveyor and receiver of the lands of Frithelstock Priory, which required him to collect rent money from all the tenants on their behalves. The Rolle family's voracious appetite and great skill for amassing Devon property later saw Frithelstock Priory become one of their own estates. He was much involved in the legal affairs of Lisle's wife's dower manor of Umberleigh and in the protracted legal struggle to obtain the Beaumont inheritance due to her eldest son John Basset (1518–1541), by her first husband John Basset (1462–1528) of Umberleigh. His letter to Lady Lisle dated 25 July 1534 includes the line "Madame, also your ladyship doth know that I bought your images and scripture for Mr Basset and for that I am now paid", which refers to the still surviving monumental brasses on the tomb of her first husband in Atherington Church. Thirteen of Rolle's autograph letters survive in the Lisle Letters, some written from London and a few signed "from my poor house of Stevenstone". Two of Rolle's granddaughters were named Honor, apparently after Lady Lisle and his second son George Rolle married the daughter of Lady Lisle's step-daughter Margery Marrys, (née Basset).

==== Surviving correspondence ====
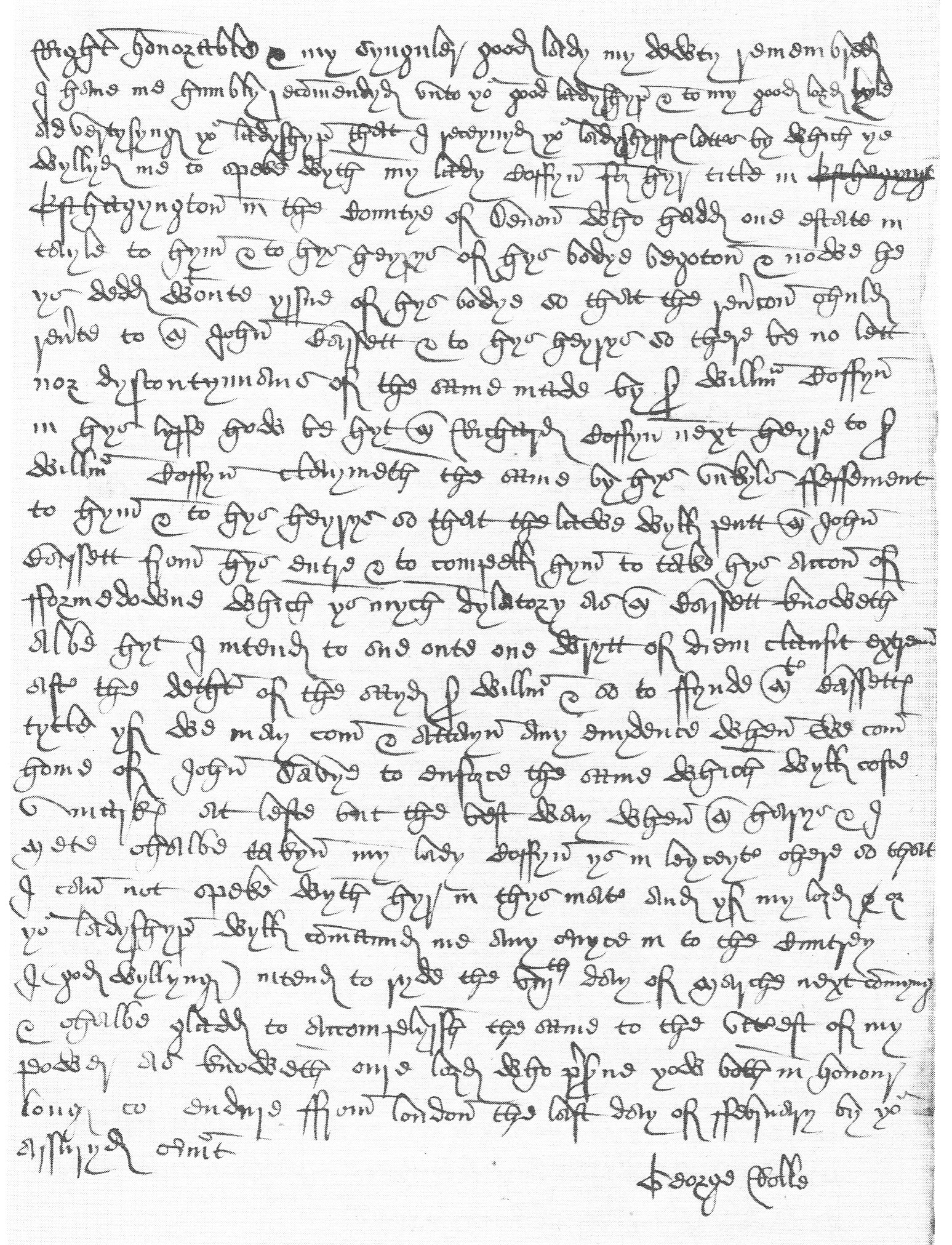
Letter written by George Rolle to Lady Lisle dated 28 February 1539, Lisle Letters, National Archives

Thirteen letters written by George Rolle survive in the Lisle Letters of which the following to Lady Lisle dated 28 February 1539 is an example, mainly dealing with the disputed Beaumont-Basset inheritance:

"Right honourable and my singular good lady, my duty remembered, I have me humbly recommended unto your good ladyship and to my good Lord Lyle advertising your ladyship that I received your ladyship's letter by which ye willed me to speak with my Lady Coffyn for her title in East Haggynton in the county of Devon who had one estate in tail to him and to his heirs of her body begotten; and now he is dead without issue of his body so that the reversion should revert to Mr John Basset and to his heirs so there be no let nor discontinuance of the same made by Sir William Coffyn in his life. Howbeit Mr Richard Coffyn, next heir to Sir William Coffyn, claimeth the same by his uncle's feoffment to him and to his heirs so that the law will put Mr John Basset from his entry and to compel him to take his action of form down (Note: "Formedon", a writ of right for claiming entailed property) which is much dilatory as Mr Basset knoweth albeit I intend to sue unto one writ of diem clausit extremum after the death of the said Sir William and so to find Mr Basset's title if we may come and attain any evidence, (Note: Evidence, obsolete term for "title deed") when we come home, of John Davy, to enforce the same which will cost v marks at least. But the best way when Mr Harys and I meet shall be taken. My Lady Coffyn is in Leicestershire so that I could not speak with her in this matter. And if my lord or your ladyship will command me any service into the country I (God willing) intend to ride (Note: to ride into Devon from London) the viii th day of March next coming and shall be glad to accomplish the same to the utterest of my power as knoweth our Lord who preserve you both in honour long to endure. Ffrom London the last day of Ffebruary, by your assuryd servant George Rolle".

== Lands and assets acquired ==
The following lands in Devon were amongst those acquired by George Rolle:

- Stevenstone in the parish of St Giles in the Wood near the town of Great Torrington in Devon, which he made his principal seat, and which long remained that of his descendants. Rolle's contemporary the antiquarian John Leland (died 1552) noted at this place his "fair brick building", uncommon at the time in Devon. Rolle's work in the Court of Common Pleas brought him into contact with Sir Lewis Pollard (c. 1465 – 1526), lord of the manor of King's Nympton in Devon, a Justice of the Common Pleas from 1514 to 1526 and Member of Parliament for Totnes in 1491. The Pollard family were first established in Devon before the 13th century at the manor of Way in the parish of St Giles in the Wood, where Sir Lewis Pollard's father had been born and where his senior first cousin still lived. It was Pollard's eldest son, Sir Hugh Pollard (fl.1535,1545), of King's Nympton, Sheriff of Devon in 1535/6, who in his capacity as Recorder of Barnstaple in 1545, nominated Rolle to one of the parliamentary seats of the Borough of Barnstaple. Stevenstone eventually at the start of the 20th century became the caput of "the largest estate Devon had ever seen", when held by the eventual heir of the two main branches of the Rolle family, Charles John Robert Hepburn-Stuart-Forbes-Trefusis, 21st Baron Clinton (1863–1957), today managed by the Clinton Devon Estates company.
- Buckland Brewer, which manor, termed a "barony" although not generally recognised as having been an ancient feudal barony, he purchased in 1544.
- In 1545 in partnership with Nicholas Adams (died 1557/84), MP, of Combe, Dartmouth, one of the Commissioners for the suppression of chantries in Devon. and whose wife Cicely Fulford was 1st cousin of Sir John Chichester (died 1569) of Raleigh, Pilton, (Note: Their mothers were both daughters of John Bourchier, 1st Earl of Bath.) he purchased lands in south Devon worth £720, including the manor of Townstall, later the seat of Adams.
- Pilton Priory, near Barnstaple, of which he acquired a large part after the Dissolution. On 6 August 1544 in partnership with the Lincoln's Inn lawyer George Haydon (c. 1517 – 1558), co-MP with Rolle for Barnstaple in 1545, he acquired the Priory's agricultural estates in the parishes of Parracombe, Ilfracombe, Ashford, Pilton, Marwood, North Molton, Goodleigh and Okeford, amounting in total annual value to £9 6s 9d and 26 capons. On 28 September 1545 in partnership with Nicholas Adams (died 1557/84) he acquired properties formerly leased from the Crown by Richard Duke (died 1572), the first post-Dissolution holder, comprising several small tenements, cottages and plots of land of Pilton Priory, to a total annual value of £16 6s 0d. He disposed of parts immediately in 1545, at much inflated prices, including Littabourne, mostly to the occupying tenants. Adams was one of the Commissioners for the suppression of the chantries in Devon and Cornwall established in 1546 and Haydon was a member of the same body re-founded in 1548.
- Wardship in 1526 of the minor Hugh Culme (died 1545) of Molland-Champson
- Wardship of Margaret Marrys, daughter and sole heiress of William Marrys of "Marrys", i.e. Marhayes Manor, Week St Mary, Cornwall, whose marriage he bequeathed in his will to his son George Rolle.
- Properties in Borough of Barnstaple. (Note: A deed dated 1540 in the Archives of the Borough of Barnstaple (B1/1098) at the North Devon Record Office is summarised as follows: Rolle v. Harrison exemplification, disseisin, properties in Barnstaple, Ashreigney, Winkleigh, Broadwoodkelly, Meeth, Huish and Great Torrington.)
- Buckfast Place (alias the "Abbot's Lodge"), Cathedral Close, in the parish of St Martin, Exeter. His townhouse, where he died, comprising "messuage, garden and curtilage". It was held from the crown in burgage, worth 30 shillings. This house, later known as the "Abbot's Lodge", was destroyed in 1942 during World War II bombing. It had been the townhouse of the Abbot of Buckfast Abbey, which Abbey and much of its lands, apparently excluding the Abbot's Lodge, had been acquired following the Dissolution of the Monasteries by Sir Thomas Denys (c. 1477 – 1561) of Holcombe Burnell, whose eventual heir was the Rolle family. In 1545 following the Dissolution of the Monasteries George Rolle had acquired "Buckfast House", later known as the Abbot's Lodge, where he died in 1552. The house remained the Rolle townhouse until its sale in 1737. Sir Henry Rolle (1545–1625) of Stevenstone made alterations to the Abbot's Lodge and added decorative heraldic plaster escutcheons dated 1602, one of which showed Rolle impaling Watts of six quarters the other Rolle impaling Fortescue, for his first and second wives respectively. In 1669 Sir John Rolle (1626–1706) entertained the Grand Duke of Tuscany at the Abbot's Lodge.

== Marriages ==
George Rolle married three times:

- Elizabeth Ashton, of unknown origin, who died before 1522. (Note: Hawkyard, 2nd marriage 1522, thus Elizabeth dead by then)
- Eleanor Dacres, second daughter of Henry Dacres, Merchant Taylor and Alderman of London, whom he married sometime before 1522, and by whom he had six sons and five daughters. Eleanor's sister Anne Dacres was the wife of Sir John Pakington (died 1551), MP, of Hampton Lovett, Worcestershire, and her other sister Alice Dacres was the wife of Robert Cheseman (died 1547), MP for Middlesex. Henry Dacres' monumental brass exists in St Dunstan's Church in the West, City of London, showing two brass kneeling figures, male and female, with labels protruding from their mouths. Beneath them is the following inscription: "Here lyeth buryed the body of Henry Dacres, Cetezen and Marchant Taylor and sumtyme Alderman of London, and Elizabeth his wyffe, the whych Henry decessed the ? day of ? the yere of our Lord God ? and the said Elizabeth decessed the xxiii day of Apryll the yere of our Lord God Mdc and xxx." (Note: "The said Elizabeth survived, and remarried Robert Dacres, esq. of Cheshunt, Privy Councillor and Master of the Requests to Henry VIII. (son of Henry Dacres, esq. of Mayfield, Staffordshire, citizen, Merchant Taylor, and Alderman of London, who with Elizabeth his wife lies buried in the church of St. Dunstan in the West), which Robert died 20 November 1543. By her he had George Dacres, esq. of Cheshunt, his heir, and a daughter Dorothy wife to FitzRalph Chamberlaine, esq. of Gedding, in Suffolk. Immediately upon the death of Robert Dacres, viz. in 35 Hen. VIII. 1543-4, an exchange was confirmed by act of parliamentf between the King, George Dacres, esq. and John Denny, esq. both above mentioned, for some of their respective manors, whereby the said Denny received certain manors, &c. in Hertfordshire, belonging to the King, who received Dacres' manors, &c. in Essex, and the manor of Apuldrefield was confirmed to the said Dacres, subject to a fee-farm rent of 3/. lis. in lieu of service at Dover Castle; this last named gentleman on 13 June, 4 Elizabeth 1562, conveyed the manor, charged with the dower of Elizabeth his wife, daughter of Sir Wymond Carew of East Anthony, Cornwall, Knight, g to John Lennard, esq. of Chevening, Kent, to whom, in Trinity term 8 Elizabeth, 1566, he levied a fine. Alderman Dacres, of Fleet Street, married two wives, Elizabeth, who died 26 April 1530 (M. I.), and Alice, who survived him. In his will, dated 15 January 1536-7, and proved 14 June 1539, he directs his body to be buried in the church of St. Dunstan in the West, London. See his epitaph printed in the Collectanea Topographica ct Genealogies, vol. iv. p. 98. He left issue Robert, above mentioned; Ann, who married Sir John Packington, of Hampton Lovett.co. Worcester Chirographer in the Court of Common Pleas, Sec. knighted 37 Hen. VIII. 1545-6, who was dead 11 November 1552, and lies buried at Hampton Lovett (M.) by whom she left issue. She died 22 Aug. 1563, and lies buried at St. Botolph's, Aldersgate. Ellenor, second wife of George Rolle, of London, merchant, and of Stevenstone, in St. Giles's, co. Devon (a quo the Lords Rolle), whose will is dated 11 November 1552, and proved 9 February 1552-3; and Alice, married to Robt. Cheeseman, esq. of Dormanswell, Norwood, co. Middlesex, who died 13 July 1547, and lies buried at Norwood (M). The arms of Dacres are, Argent, a chevron gules between three pellets, on each an escallop of the first. Crest, A dove argent charged on the breast with an escallop or, between two oak branches vert, fructed of the second": quoted from John Gough Nichols (1858).)
- Margery, of unknown family, whom he married before 23 June 1551 as her third husband, the widow of Henry Brinklow and Stephen Vaughan, both of London. Margery remarried to Sir Leonard Chamberlain (died 1561), MP for Oxfordshire in 1554.

== Children ==
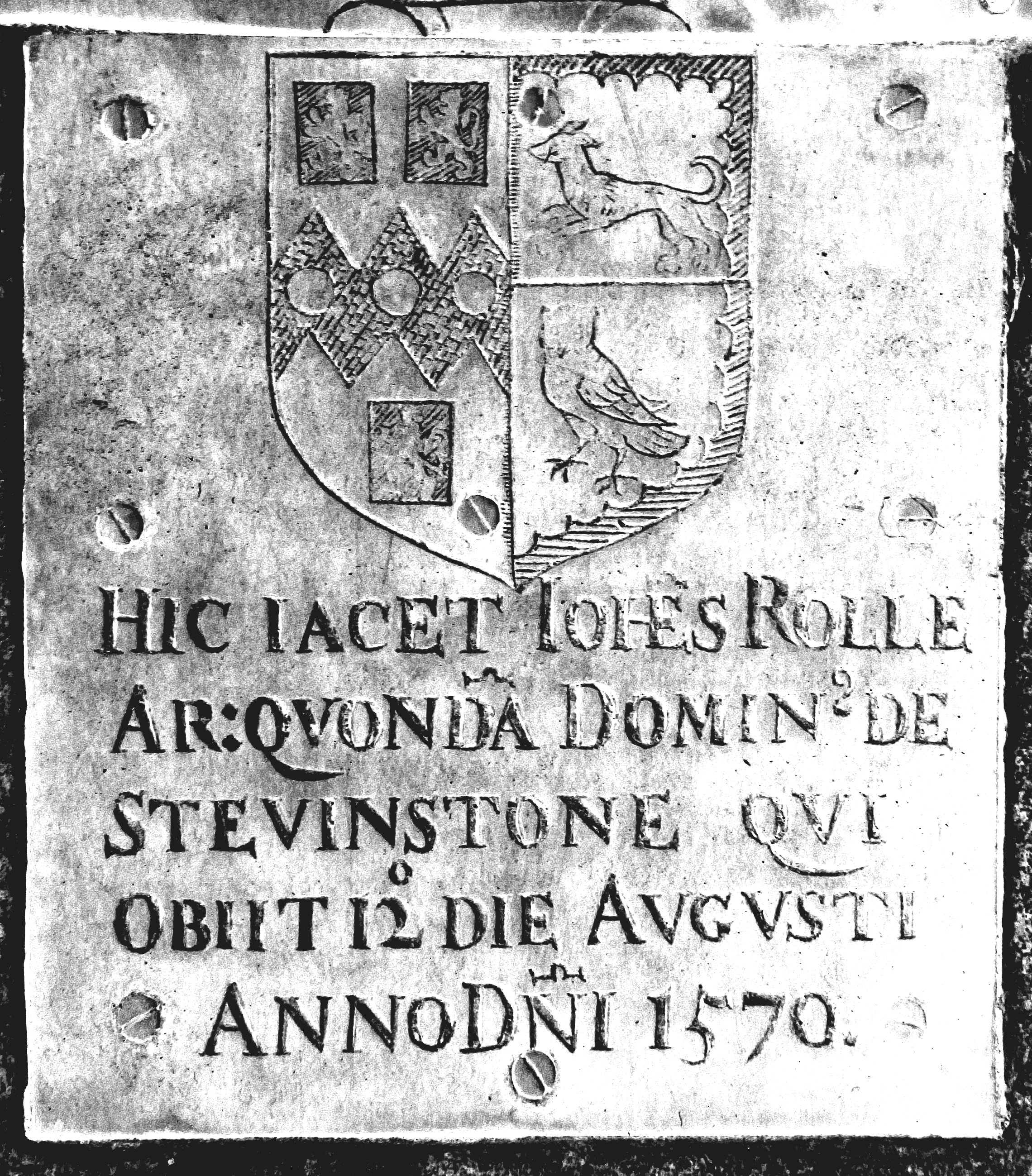
Small monumental brass of John Rolle (died 1570), St Giles in the Wood Church

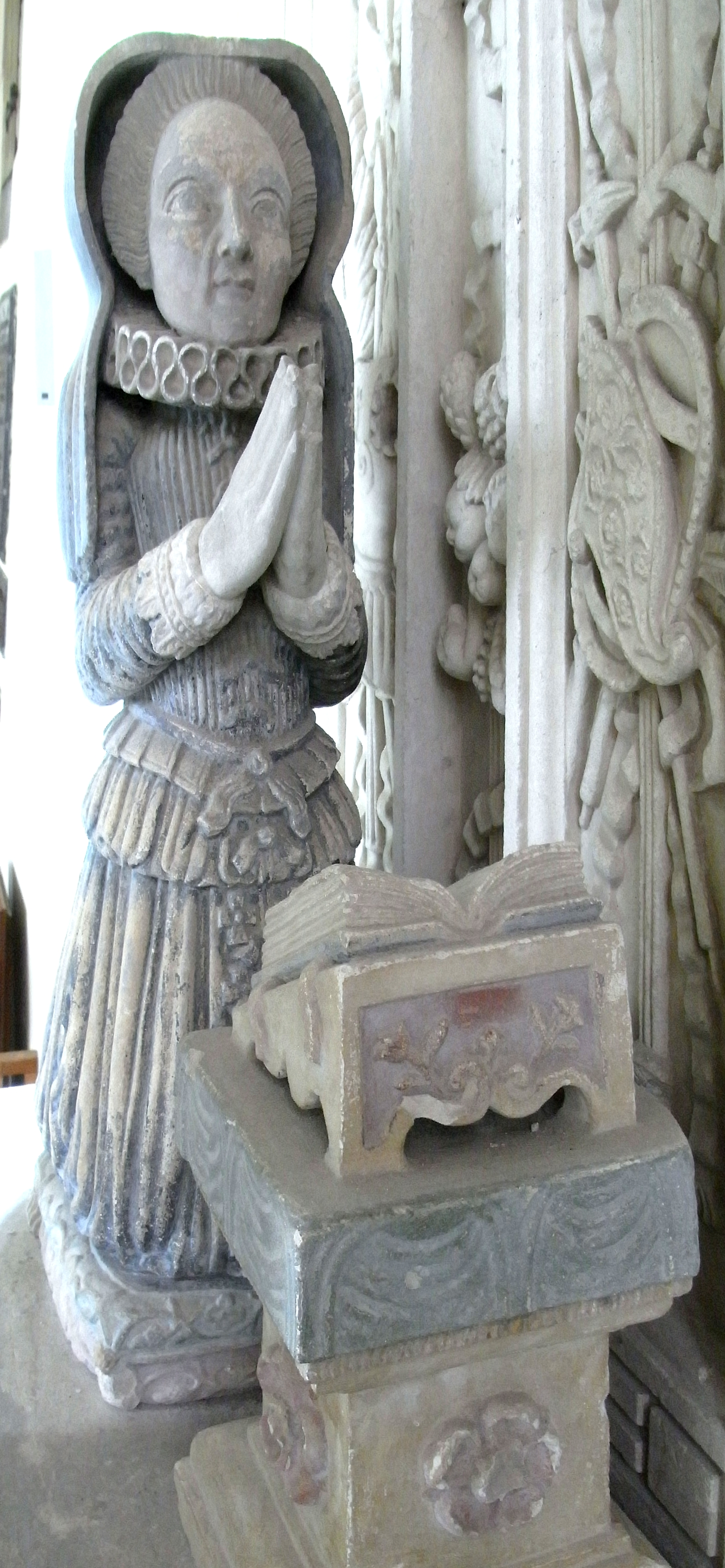
Small kneeling effigy of Elizabeth Rolle, on monument to her second husband Sir John Acland (died 1620) of Columb John, in Broadclyst Church

By his second wife Eleanor Dacres, George Rolle had children including the following:

- John Rolle (1522–1570) of Stevenstone, eldest son, who married Margaret Ford, daughter of John Ford of Ashburton. His small monumental brass survives now affixed by modern screws into the floor of the south aisle of St Giles in the Wood parish Church, beneath the separate brass figure of his wife, but formerly affixed to his two and a half foot high chest tomb situated in the chancel of that church as recorded by Prince in his 1710 work "Worthies of Devon". It is inscribed in Latin thus: "Hic jacet Joh(ann)es Rolle, Ar(miger), quonda(m) domin(u)s de Stevinstone qui obiit 12.o (duodecimo) die Augusti Anno D(omi)ni 1570" ("Here lies John Rolle, Esquire, sometime lord of Stevenstone who died on the 12th day of August in the year of Our Lord 1570"). The arms show Rolle impaling Party per fesse argent (or azure) and sable, in chief a greyhound current in base an owl within a bordure engrailed all counter-changed" (Ford) (Note: Lysons gives the following description of the Ford family: Ford, of Chagford, &c. — Eight descents of this family are described in the visitation of 1620. Prince supposes them to have been descended from the Fords, of Fordmore, in Moreton Hampsted, settled there as early as the 12th century; the heiress of that family married Charles, of Tavistock. The Fords, of Chagford, settled there in consequence of a marriage with the heiress of Hill. John, the fourth in descent, who was of Ashburton, married the heiress of Holwell, by whom he had a daughter and heiress married to St. Clere. The son of a second marriage continued the family. John Ford, of Bagtor, married the heiress of Drake, of Spratshays, in Littleham, and was father of Sir Henry Ford, of Nutwell, who was chief secretary for Ireland, under Arthur Capel, Earl of Essex, and was buried at Woodbury, in 1684: he left a son Charles, supposed to have died in his minority, and three daughters, married to Drake, (ancestor of George Drake, Esq., of Ipplepen,) Holwill, and Egerton. John, second son of John Ford above mentioned, continued the line at Ashburton; Mr. John Ford, who died in 1677, is supposed to have been the last of the branch: there was another younger branch at Totnes. Arms: — Party per fesse, A. and S., in chief, a greyhound current; in base, an owl within a border engrailed, all counterchanged. Crest: — A demi-greyhound, charged with a bend, Argent, collar'd, Or, between 2 apple branches fructed of the second.)
- George Rolle (died 1573), married Margaret Marrys, daughter and sole heir of William Marrys of "Marrys", i.e. Marhayes Manor, Week St Mary, Cornwall. The wardship of Margaret Marrys had been acquired by George Rolle who in his will left her wardship to his son George, who therefore chose to marry her himself. Margaret Marrys' mother was Margery (or Mary) Basset, a daughter of Sir John Basset (1462–1528) by his first wife Elizabeth Denys, and was thus Lady Lisle's step-daughter. The manor of Marrys was adjacent to the Basset manor of Femarshall, part of which Margery had as her dower. George Rolle named one of his daughters Honor, apparently after Lady Lisle, as his elder brother John Rolle had done for one of his daughters also.
- Henry Rolle, who married Margaret Yeo, daughter and sole heiress of Robert Yeo of Heanton Satchville, Petrockstowe by his wife Mary Fortescue, daughter of Bartholomew Fortescue of Filleigh.
- Maurice Rolle, who married Margaret Brier. They were the great-great grandparents of Edward Rolle.
- Jacquetta Rolle, who married Richard Gilbert. She received a grant of her late father's goods after the death of her brother George in 1573.
- Elizabeth Rolle, who married twice: firstly to Robert Mallet, of Woolleigh near Great Torrington. Her daughter and the eventual heiress of Woolleigh was Eleanor Mallet (1573–1645), the mother of Sir John Acland, 1st Baronet (1591–1647) of Acland, Landkey and of Columb John, which family (later of Killerton) went on to become one of the greatest landowning dynasties in Devon and the Southwest, almost equalling the Rolles. Secondly, as his first wife, she married Sir John Acland (died 1620) of Columb John, Broadclyst, Devon, whose great nephew and heir was Sir John Acland, 1st Baronet (1591–1647). A small kneeling figure representing Elizabeth Rolle survives on the monument with effigy to her 2nd husband in St John's Church, Broadclyst.
- Maria Rolle, died childless. She married James Dalton (died 1601), MP.

== Death and burial ==
He died at his Exeter townhouse Buckfast Place, in the parish of St Martin, on 20 November 1552, nine days after having signed his will dated 11 November 1552. He requested to be buried "in such place as he should die at", which remains unknown.

== Will ==
Collins Peerage of England quotes from his will as follows:

"He therein bequeaths his soul to the Holy Trinity, and all the holy company of saints, and his body to be buried in such place, where he shall depart this miserable life, in such manner as shall please Margery his wife, whom he makes his sole executrix. He bequeaths to Jackit Rolle, Besse Rolle, and Mary Rolle, his daughters, 600 marks each, to be received and paid by his trusty servants and friends, John Wychalf, Geffery Tuthyll, Richard Staveley, and John Thore, or any two of them, out of all his manors, lands, etc. in the counties of Devon, Somerset and Cornwall, accounting to his wife once in the year whilst she lives, within one month after the feast of St. Michael. He grants and bequeaths to George, his son, the wardship and marriage of Margaret Marrys, daughter and sole heir to Edmund Marrys, of the parish of St Mary Wyke in the county of Cornwall, in as ample manner as he had of the gift and grant of the said Edmund Marrys, paying yearly to the said Edmund £ ? during his life. The residue of his goods, etc., he bequeaths to Margery his wife, his sole executrix. He bequeaths to his daughter, (?)Mary Rolle, two tenements in Wandsworth, with the appurtenances; and if she die unmarried, then to his daughter, Elizabeth Rolle, and her heirs. He also bequeathed to his daughter Mary, a basin and ewer, engraved with her mother's arms; and if she died unmarried, then to his daughter, Elizabeth Rolle. And whereas his late brother-in-law, Sir John Pakington, by the name of John Pakington, of Hampton-Lovet in the county of Worcester, Esq. by writing obligatory, dated February 15th, in 28 Hen. VIII. became bounden to him, the said George Rolle, and to Harry Dacres, merchant of London, and others, now deceased, on condition that the said Sir John Pakington, cause to be made 'to Edmund Knightley, serjeant at law, the said George Rolle, and others, a sufficient estate of, and in manors, lands, &c. in the shires of Worcester, Hereford, Stafford, Salop, and Middlesex, or any of them, to the clear yearly value of 120/. over and above all charges, &c. whereof the manor of Chadsley Corbet, with the appurtenances, in Worcestershire, should be parcel; to hold to the said John Pakington, and Anne, for term of the life of the said Anne, and to the heir male of the body of the said Sir John Pakington. His will is, that William Sheldon, of the county of Worcester, Esq. and John Prydyaux, Gent, shall be his executors for the said writing, and be governed in all and every suit, for the recovery of the debt contained in the said obligation, by his dear and well-beloved sister-in law, dame Anne Pakington, widow, for whose security the said obligation was made".
