= Thomas Curteys (politician) =

English politician (died c.1407)

Thomas Curteys (died c. 1407) was an English politician. He sat as MP for Lostwithiel in February 1383, October 1383, February 1388, January 1397, September 1397, and 1402.

He also served as commissioner to close the ports of Looe, Polperro and Fowey in May 1401.

He was perhaps the son of John Curteys. He married Maud, the daughter and coheiress of Sir Thomas Fitzwalter and they had two sons (John and Tristram).
