= James Dalton (MP for Saltash) =

English politician

James Dalton (died 1601) was an English politician.

He was a Member (MP) of the Parliament of England for Saltash in 1563, 1571 and 1572, Lostwithiel in 1584 and 1586, and for Preston in 1593. He married Mary Rolle, a daughter of George Rolle (d. 1553), MP, of Stevenstone in Devon.
