= Stephen Kendale =

English politician

Stephen Kendale (fl. 1406 – 1450) was an English politician. He sat as MP for Lostwithiel in 1417, during the reign of Henry V.

He also served as Mayor of Lostwithiel in Michaelmas 1418–1419, 1427–1428, 1429–1430. and 1436–1438 and as tax collector of Cornwall in March 1442.

He was the son and heir of John Kendale. He married Christine and had at least two sons including Richard Kendale and probably Thomas Kendale.
