= John Kendale =

English politician (died c. 1402)

John Kendale (died circa. 1402) was an English politician. He sat as MP for Lostwithiel in January 1397 and September 1397.

He was the son of John Kendale (died c. 1372) and Alice. He married and had two sons including Stephen Kendale who sat for Lostwithiel in 1417. In 1390, Kendale was suspected of counterfeiting the king's seal by the English government.
