= Frithelstock Priory =

Former Augustinian priory in Devon, England

Coordinates: 50°57′18″N 4°11′18″W

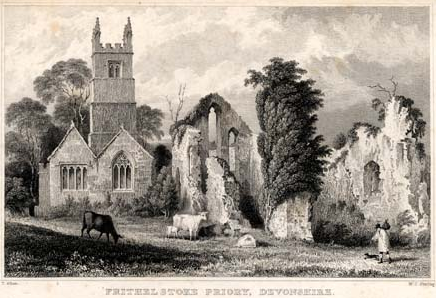
Frithelstock Priory, Devonshire, 1830 Engraving by Thomas Allom & M.J. Starling, viewed from east

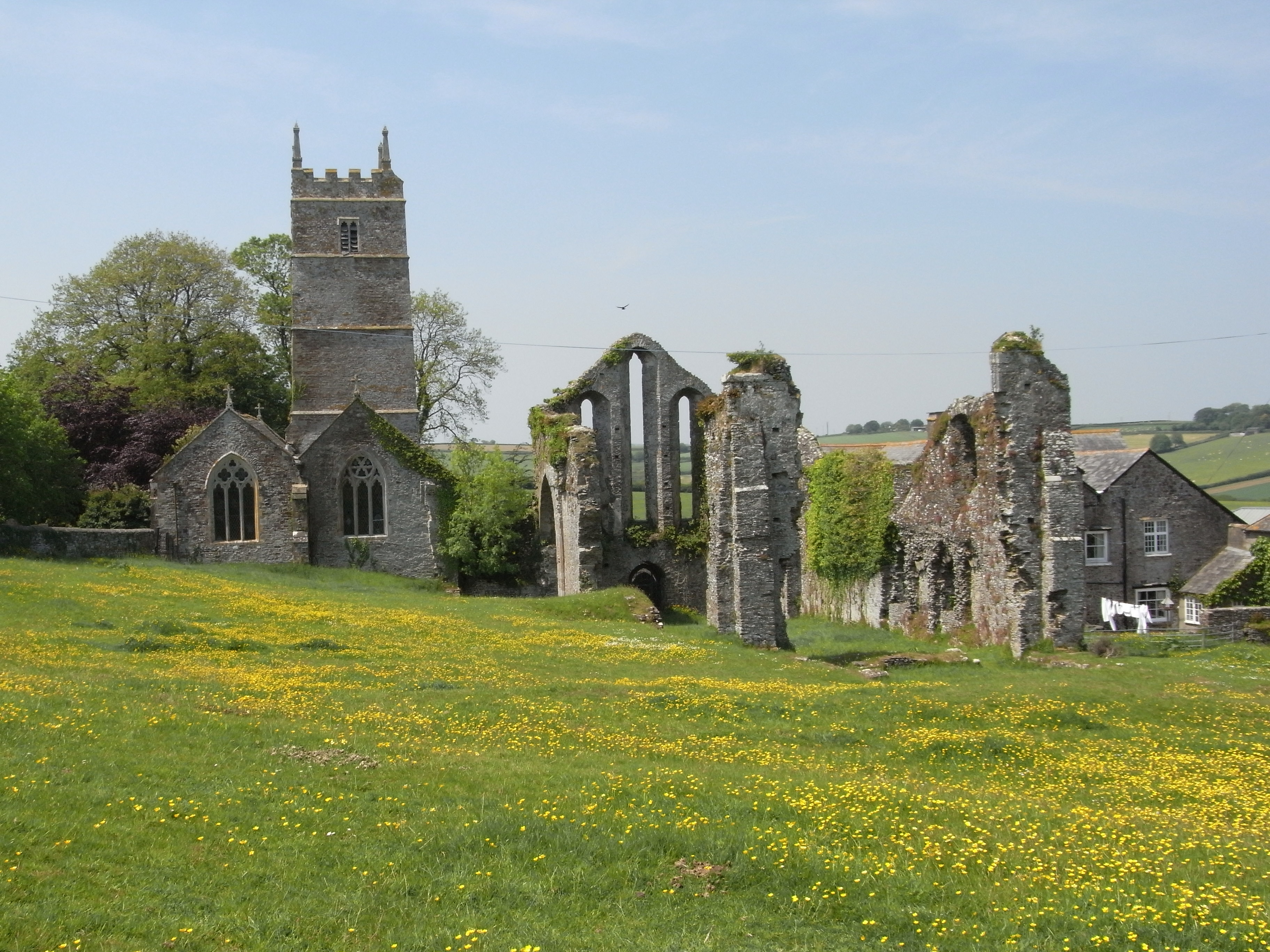
Ruins of Frithelstock Priory, centre, looking west, as 1830 view by Allom. On the left is the parish church, on the right the rectory

Frithelstock Priory was founded in about 1220 at Frithelstock, Devon, England, by Sir Robert de Beauchamp for Augustinian Canons Regular, as an indulgence to ensure intercessions for the repose of his soul. Walter de Stapledon, Bishop of Exeter, is considered a co-founder, for increasing the priory's endowments.

The priory was dissolved in 1536 during the Dissolution of the Monasteries and only ruins remain.

== History ==
The Domesday Book of 1086 lists Frelelestoch as one of the seventy-nine Devonshire holdings of Robert, Count of Mortain (c. 1031–1090), the half-brother of William the Conqueror. His tenant was Robert FitzIvo, who appears to have held no other lands in the county. The manor was later held by Sir Roger de Beauchamp who, in about 1220, donated a large part of it to the Augustinian priory dedicated to St Gregory that he had founded within it as a dependency of Hartland Abbey in North Devon.

At the Dissolution of the Monasteries, the prior relinquished possession of the priory and its demesne lands on 27 August 1536. Sir Thomas Arundell, the receiver of the Court of Augmentations in the counties of Devon, Cornwall, Dorset and Somerset, farmed the lands out to John Wynslade at an annual rent of £20 2s. On 20 January 1537 the crown leased the lands for 21 years at the same rent to Sir George Carew of Mohuns Ottery. Carew immediately conveyed the lease to Wynslade. Wynslade was not long in possession as on 4 September 1537 the crown made a grant to Arthur Plantagenet, 1st Viscount Lisle (d.1542), an illegitimate son of King Edward IV, and his wife Honora Grenville, widow of Sir John Bassett (1462–31 Jan 1529) of Umberleigh, of "The site, church, etc., and demesne of Frithelstock Priory, the manor, rectory and advowson of the vicarage of Frithelstock and the manor of Broadwoodwidger, all late of the priory". The estate was valued at about £92. Risdon reckoned the priory and Barton thus granted to contain a thousand acres. Much of the negotiations fixing the purchase price payable by Lord Lisle to the crown are recorded in the Lisle Letters, the surviving correspondence between him and his London agent John Hussee.

The priory lands were later owned by Robert Walpole, 2nd Earl of Orford (d.1751), son of Robert Walpole (d.1745) the first prime minister, whose wife was Margaret Rolle, suo jure 15th Baroness Clinton (1709–1781), daughter and sole heiress of Samuel Rolle (1646–1719) of Heanton Satchville in the parish of Petrockstowe, about six miles south-east of Frithelstock. The lands later descended to Margaret Rolle's heirs, the Barons Clinton.

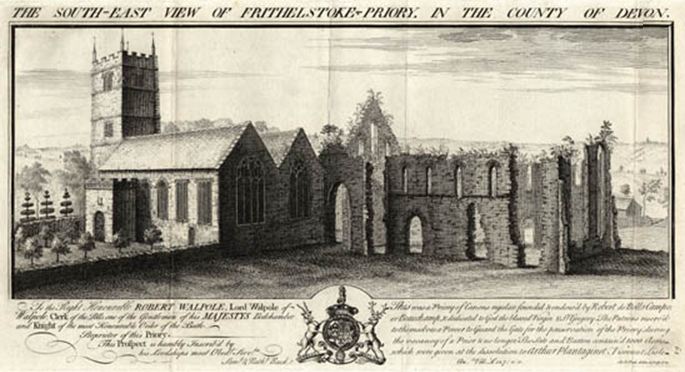
The South-East View of Frithelstoke-Priory in the County of Devon, 1734 engraving by Samuel & Nathaniel Buck

== 1734 view by Buck ==
An engraving of the south-east view was made by Samuel & Nathaniel Buck in 1734, inscribed as follows: left: "To the Right Honourable ROBERT WALPOLE, Lord Walpole of Walpole, Clerk of the Rolls, one of the Gentlemen of his MAJESTYS Bedchamber, and Knight of the most honourable Order of the Bath, Proprietor of this Priory, This Prospect is humbly Inscrib'd by his Lordships most Obedt. Servts. Saml. & Nathl. Buck." In the centre is the coat of arms of Walpole, and on the right is inscribed: "This was a Priory of Canons regular, founded & endow'd by Robert de Bello Campo or Beauchamp, & dedicated to God the blessed Virgin & St. Gregory. The Patrons reserv'd to themselves a Power to Guard the Gate for the preservation of the priory, during the vacancy of a Prior & no longer. The Scite and Barton contain'd 1000 Acres which were given at the dissolution to Arthur Plantaginet, Viscount Lisle"

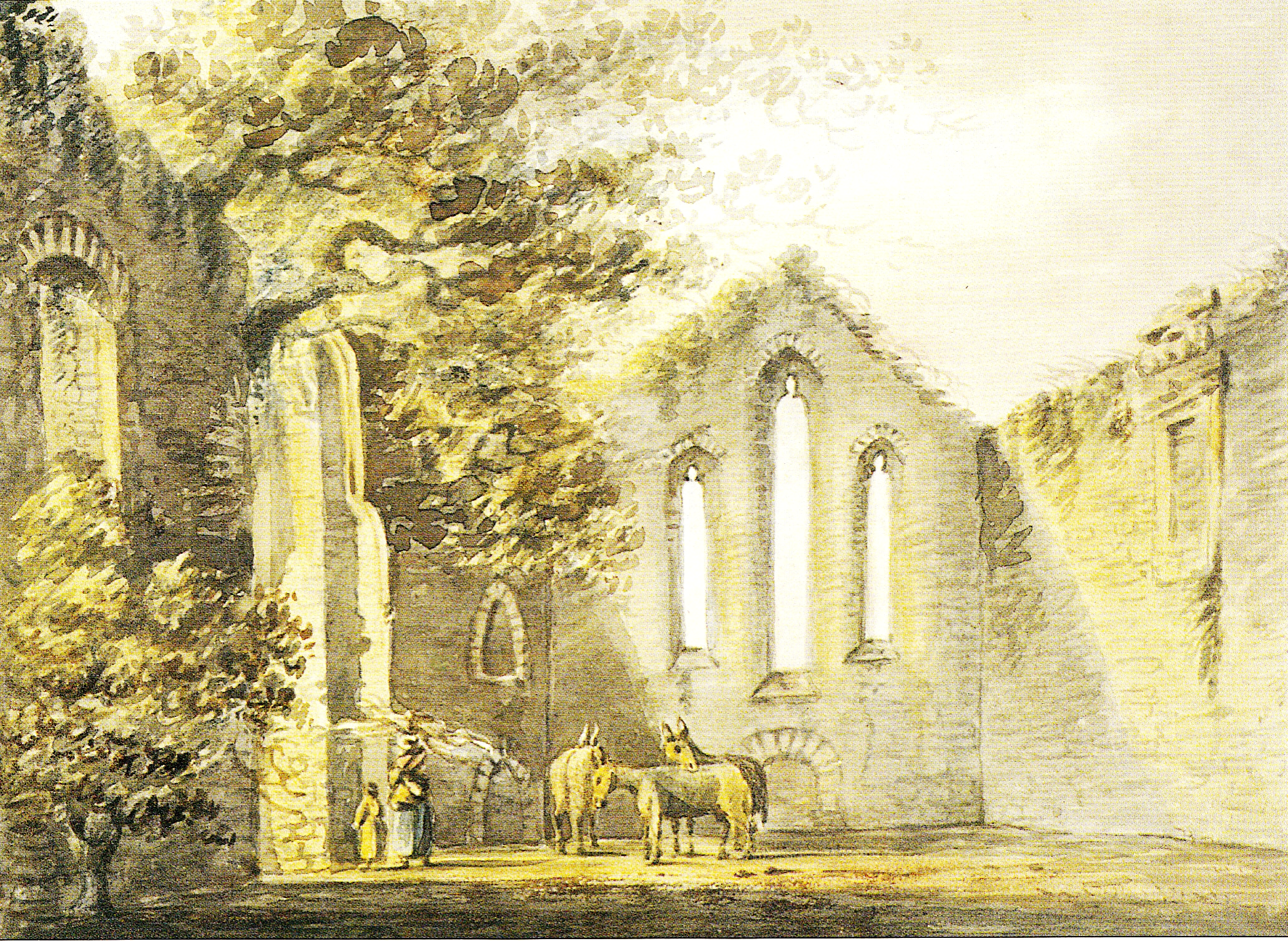
Frithelstock Priory, watercolour by Rev. John Swete dated October 1792. Devon Record Office DRO 564M/F1/101

== Visit by Rev. John Swete ==
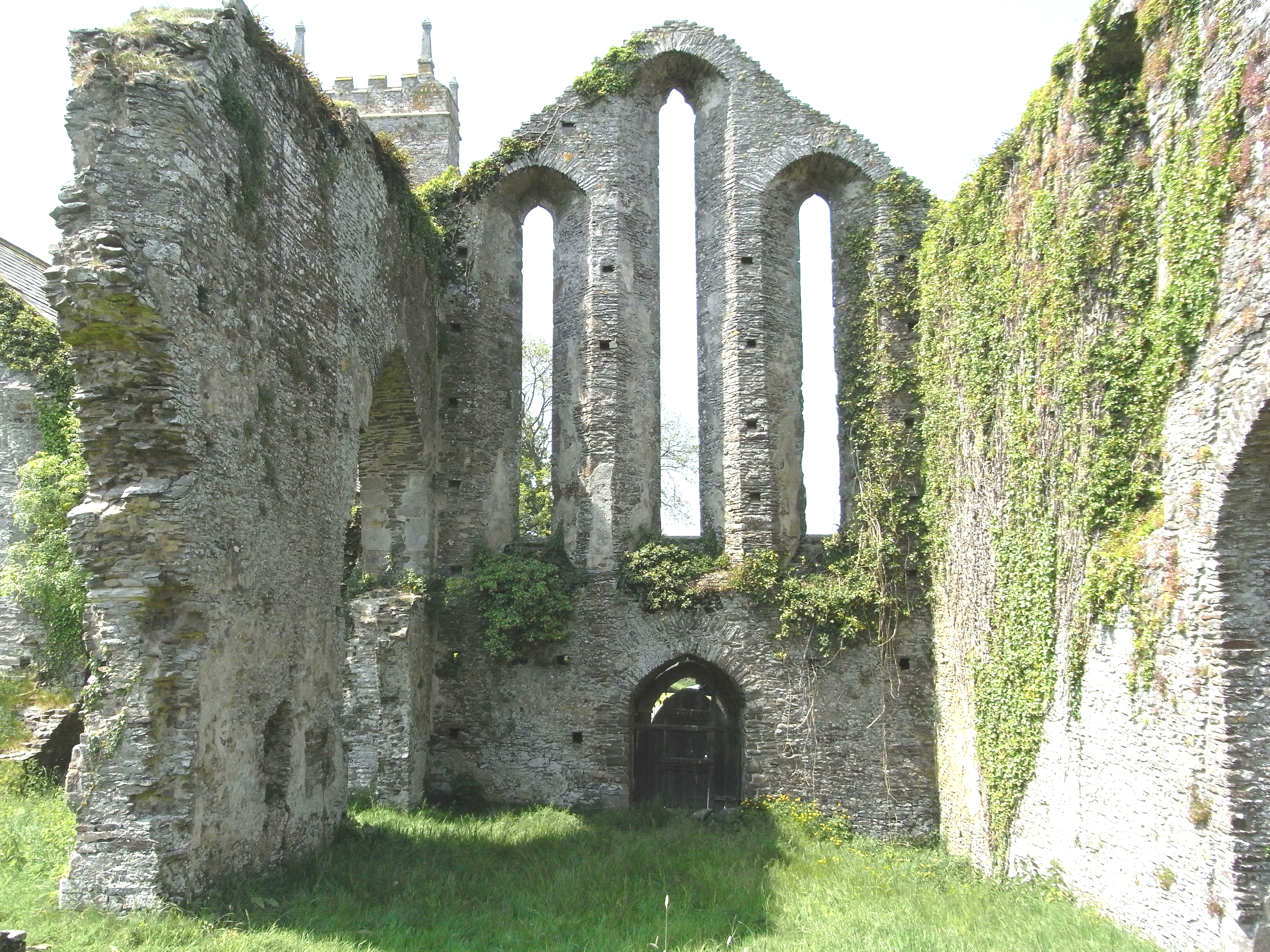
Frithelstock Priory, view in 2013 looking westward in nave, as painted by Rev. John Swete in 1792

In October 1792 the Devon topographer Rev John Swete (1752–1821) visited the ruins of Frithelstock Priory in the company of Henry Stevens (1739–1802), son of Henry and Christiana Maria, whom he had visited at Cross. He relates the journey in his Journal thus: "Accompanied by Mr Stevens I went in quest of the Priory of Frithelstock, in the way to which we descended to the bridge at the SW end of Torrington, which passing over, we again rose up a steep hill, introducing us to a common precipitous towards the river but having a delightful prospect on the north of Beam a seat of Dennis Rolle Esq., a most lovely and sequestered spot, protected on every side by the richest woods of the finest amphitheatrical form, the roots of which were washed by the river which as if enamoured of the spot winds round it in many a meander and seems reluctant to retire from it. On the summit of an hill three miles from Cross, having again past the Towridge by another bridge, we came to the ruins of the priory, which tho' not grand nor extensive have a good deal of the picturesque in them and possess a peculiarity in the rounding of the western windows of the chapel, rarely if at all to be met with. The remains consist chiefly of the side and end walls of what is now one room, the area of which in length is 30 paces and in width about 9. There are two very antient walnut trees overhanging the southern walls and with the ivy contributing greatly to enhance its beauty". Swete made a watercolour sketch of the priory, from the inside of the ruins looking toward the western wall, which survives in the Devon Record Office.

== Sources ==
- Risdon, Tristram, Survey of Devon (c.1630), 1810 edition, pp. 275–6
- Hoskins, W.G., A New Survey of England: Devon, London, 1959
