= John Tredeneck =

16th-century English politician

John Tredeneck (by 1508 – 1566), of Tredinnick in St. Breock, Cornwall, was an English politician.

He was a Member of Parliament (MP) for Lostwithiel in 1529 and for Helston in 1559.
