= John Clayton (Roundhead) =

English politician (born 1620)

John Clayton (born c. 1620) was an English politician who sat in the House of Commons in 1659 and 1660. He fought in the Parliamentary army in the English Civil War.

Clayton was the son of John Clayton, of Okenshaw, Yorkshire and his wife Elizabeth Fitzwilliam, daughter of Gerard Fitzwilliam of Bentley. His father was a barrister and recorde of Leeds. He was admitted at Clare College, Cambridge on 18 June 1638 and matriculated in 1639. He was admitted at Inner Temple in 1639 and was called to the bar in 1648. In 1643, he was a captain of foot in the Parliamentary army and took the colours of Sir William Savile in the capture of Leeds. He fought in the defence of Hull and became major before 1650.

In 1659, Clayton was elected Member of Parliament for Lostwithiel in the Third Protectorate Parliament. In 1660, he was elected MP for Lostwithiel in the Convention Parliament. There was a double return which was resolved in his favour in June. He was imprisoned for four months in 1662 on a charge of treasonable words. The last evidence of him is in 1694 when he complained to the benchers of his Inn about his chambers, which had been sublet to a "blackamoor".

Clayton was unmarried and over 50 on the death of his father in 1671 and had to marry within three years to inherit. He married Thomasine Goodwin, widow of Deane Goodwin of Bletchingley and daughter of Sir Samuel Owfield of Upper Gatton Surrey.

Parliament of England
Preceded by Not represented in Second Protectorate Parliament	Member of Parliament for Lostwithiel; 1659; With: Walter Moyle	Succeeded by Not represented in restored Rump
