= Mayor of Lostwithiel =

The following were mayors of Lostwithiel, Cornwall, England:

1389–90: John Curteys.

1939-1940 Spencer Charles Brown, Naming Day 9 November 1939.
