= Tredinnick =

Tredinnick is a Cornish surname. It derives from one of the places called Tredinnick; Tredinnick is formed from the elements "tre-" (homestead) and either "dinek" (fortified), "eythinek" (overgrown with gorse) or "redenek" (overgrown with bracken).

== People ==
Notable people with the surname include:

- Alf Tredinnick, Australian rules footballer
- David Tredinnick (actor), Australian actor
- David Tredinnick (politician) (born 1950), British politician
- Mark Tredinnick (born 1962), Australian poet and writer
- Miles Tredinnick (born 1955), English musician, and stage and screenwriter
- Noël Tredinnick (born 1949), English organist and composer

== Settlements ==
Places in Cornwall called Tredinnick or Tredinneck: Tredinneck (Madron); Tredinnick (Duloe, Landrake, Lanhydrock, Luxulyan, Morval, Newlyn East, Probus, St Issey, St Keverne, St Mabyn and St Neot)

== See also ==
- John Tredeneck (died 1566), English politician
- Nick Tredennick, microprocessor designer
