= Lostwithiel (constituency) =

Former parliamentary constituency in the United Kingdom

- Former borough constituency for the House of Commons

1304–1832
- Seats: Two
- Replaced by: East Cornwall

Lostwithiel was a rotten borough in Cornwall which returned two Members of Parliament to the House of Commons in the English and later British Parliament from 1304 to 1832, when it was abolished by the Great Reform Act.

== History ==
The borough consisted of the town of Lostwithiel and part of the neighbouring Lanlivery parish; it was a market town whose trade was mainly dependent on the copper mined nearby.

Unlike many of the most notorious Cornish rotten boroughs, Lostwithiel had been continuously represented since the Middle Ages and was originally of sufficient size to justify its status. However, by the time of the Great Reform Act it had long been a pocket borough, under the complete control of the Earls of Mount Edgcumbe since 1702. The right to vote was vested in the corporation, who numbered 24 in 1816; they made no attempt to defy their patron, who regularly paid the corporation's debts and advanced them money.

In 1831, the borough had a population of 1,047, and 303 houses.

== Members of Parliament ==
=== 1304–1629 ===
- Constituency created (1304)

Parliament	First member	Second member
1355	John Hamely	
1358	John Hamely	
1388 (Feb)	Thomas Curteys	Pascoe Polruddon
1388 (Sep)	Thomas Moyle	John Mychel
1390 (Jan)	Richard Respryn	John Brown
1390 (Nov)		
1391	Simon Lowys	Robert Combe
1393	Richard Bloyowe	Roger Umfrey
1394		
1395	John Quint	William Scoce
1397 (Jan)	Thomas Curteys	John Kendale
1397 (Sep)	Thomas Curteys	John Kendale
1399	John Day	Richard Hervy
1401		
1402	Sir Henry Ilcombe	Thomas Curteys
1404 (Jan)		
1404 (Oct)		
1406	John Curteys	Gregory Aute
1407	Sir Henry Ilcombe	Robert Kayl
1410	Robert Kayl	?
1411	John Curteys	Thomas Jayet
1413 (Feb)		
1413 (May)	John Curteys	John Clink
1414 (Apr)		
1414 (Nov)	Robert Kayl	John Trebarthe
1415		
1416 (Mar)	Robert Kayl	Thomas West
1416 (Oct)		
1417	Stephen Kendale	Thomas West
1419	Tristram Curteys	Richard Hervy
1420	Thomas Cokayn	John Trewint
1421 (May)	John Colyn	Robert Treage
1421 (Dec)	Tristram Curteys	John Trewint
1510–1523	No names known	
1529	John Tredeneck	Richard Bryan alias Croker
1536	?	
1539	?	
1542	?	
1545	Anthony Browne	Walter Mildmay
Parliament of 1547–1552	Richard Hudson	John Southcote
First Parliament of 1553	Richard Wooton	Jasper Fisher
Second Parliament of 1553	John Courtenay	Christopher Daunsey or Dauntesey or Daunce
Parliament of 1554	George Southcote	Brice Rookwood
Parliament of 1554–1555	John Southcote	John Cosworth
Parliament of 1555	John Southcote	Brice Rookwood
Parliament of 1558	John Herring	John Cosworth
Parliament of 1559	Thomas Mildmay	John Cosworth
Parliament of 1563–1567	Thomas Mildmay	John Killigrew (d.1584), of Arwenack
Parliament of 1571	Robert Snagge	William Kendall
Parliament of 1572–1581	Robert Snagge	John Barkley
Parliament of 1584–1585	James Dalton	John Shirley
Parliament of 1586–1587	James Dalton	John Agmondesham
Parliament of 1588–1589	William Fitzwilliam	William Gardiner
Parliament of 1593	Sir Francis Godolphin	Robert Beale
Parliament of 1597–1598	William Cornwallis	John Cooke
Parliament of 1601	Richard Cromwell	Nicholas Saunders
Parliament of 1604–1611	Sir Thomas Chaloner	Sir William Lower
Addled Parliament (1614)	Edward Leech	Sir Henry Vane
Parliament of 1621–1622	Edward Salter	George Chudleigh
Happy Parliament (1624–1625)	John Chichester (d.1669) of Hall	Sir John Hobart
Useless Parliament (1625)	Double return	
Parliament of 1625–1626	Sir Robert Mansell	Reginald Mohun
Parliament of 1628-1629	Sir Robert Carr, also elected for Preston; Sir Thomas Badger	John Chudleigh
No Parliament summoned 1629–1640

=== 1640–1832 ===
Year	First member	First party	Second member	Second party
April 1640	Richard Arundell	Royalist	Nicholas Kendall	
November 1640	Richard Arundell	Royalist	John Trevanion	Royalist
July 1643	Richard Arundell	Royalist	Trevanion killed in action – seat vacant	
January 1644	Arundell disabled from sitting – seat vacant		Trevanion killed in action – seat vacant	
1646	Sir John Maynard		Francis Holles	
December 1648	Maynard not recorded as having sat after Pride's Purge		Holles excluded in Pride's Purge – seat vacant	
1653	Lostwithiel was unrepresented in the Barebones Parliament and the First and Second Parliaments of the Protectorate			
January 1659	Walter Moyle		John Clayton	
May 1659	Not represented in the restored Rump			
April 1660	Walter Moyle		John Clayton	
1661	Sir Chichester Wrey		John Bulteel	
1668	Charles Smythe		John Bulteel	
1670	Charles Smythe		Silius Titus	
1679	Sir John Carew		Walter Kendall	
1685	Sir Robert Southwell		Sir Matthias Vincent	
1689	Francis Robartes		Walter Kendall	
1690	Sir Bevil Granville		Walter Kendall	
1695	Bernard Granville		Samuel Travers	
1698	George Booth		Samuel Travers	
January 1701	Sir John Molesworth	Tory	John Buller	
April 1701	Sir John Molesworth	Tory	George Booth	
1702	Sir John Molesworth	Tory	Russell Robartes	
1705	Robert Molesworth	Whig	Russell Robartes	
1706	James Kendall		Russell Robartes	
1708	James Kendall		Joseph Addison	Whig
1709	Francis Robartes		Russell Robartes	
January 1710	Francis Robartes		Horatio Walpole	
October 1710	John Hill	Tory	Hugh Fortescue	
1713	Sir Thomas Clarges		Erasmus Lewis	
1715	Galfridus Walpole		Thomas Liddell	
1718	Galfridus Walpole		Edward Eliot	
1720	Galfridus Walpole		John Newsham	
1721	Marquess of Hartington	Whig	John Newsham	
1722	Marquess of Hartington	Whig	Lord Stanhope	Whig
1724	Sir Orlando Bridgeman	Whig	Henry Parsons	
January 1727	Sir Orlando Bridgeman	Whig	Hon. Sir William Stanhope	
August 1727	Sir Orlando Bridgeman	Whig	Darell Trelawny	
1728	Anthony Cracherode		Sir Edward Knatchbull	
1730	Anthony Cracherode		Edward Walpole	
1734	Richard Edgcumbe	Whig	Philip Lloyd	
1735	Richard Edgcumbe	Whig	Matthew Ducie Moreton	
1736	Richard Edgcumbe	Whig	Sir John Crosse	
1741	Sir Robert Cotton		Sir John Crosse	
1747	Richard Edgcumbe	Whig	James Colleton	
1754	Thomas Clarke		James Colleton	
1761	George Howard		James Colleton	
1766	Viscount Beauchamp	Tory	James Colleton	
1768	Henry Cavendish		Charles Brett	
1774	Viscount Fairford		Charles Brett	
1776	Viscount Fairford		Thomas Potter	
September 1780	Hon. John St. John		Hon. Thomas de Grey	
December 1780	Commodore George Johnstone	Independent	Hon. Thomas de Grey	
1781	Commodore George Johnstone	Independent	Viscount Malden	
1784	John Sinclair		John Thomas Ellis	
1790	Viscount Valletort		Reginald Pole-Carew	
1791	George Smith		Reginald Pole-Carew	
1796	Hans Sloane		William Drummond	
1802	Hans Sloane		William Dickinson	
1806	The Viscount Lismore		William Dickinson	
January 1807	The Viscount Lismore		Charles Cockerell	
May 1807	George Peter Holford		Ebenezer Maitland	
1812	Reginald Pole-Carew		John Ashley Warre	
1816	Viscount Valletort	Tory	John Ashley Warre	
1818	Sir Robert Wigram	Tory	Sir Alexander Grant	Tory
June 1826	Viscount Valletort	Tory	Sir Alexander Grant	Tory
December 1826	Viscount Valletort	Tory	Edward Cust	Tory
August 1830	Hon. William Vesey-Fitzgerald	Tory	Edward Cust	Tory
December 1830	Viscount Valletort	Tory	Edward Cust	Tory
1832	Constituency abolished			
