= Stevenstone =

Former manor in Devon, England

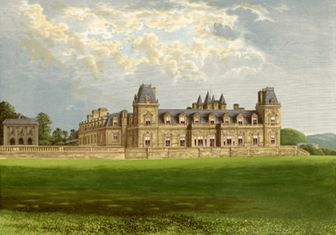
- Image of Stevenstone House published in Morris, Rev. F.O. Picturesque Views of Seats of Noblemen & Gentlemen of Great Britain & Ireland, London, 1880

- Location within Devon
- 50.9542°N 4.0983°W
- Location: St Giles in the Wood

History
- Demolished: 1868; 1931
- Rebuilt: 1868–1872

Site notes
- Area: 55,592 acres (22,497 ha)
- Architect: Charles Barry Jr.

Listed Building – Grade II

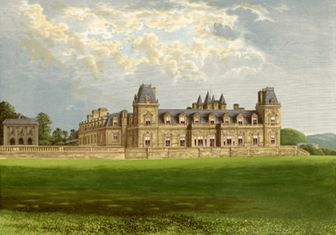
Stevenstone House, built by Hon. Mark Rolle between 1868 and 1872 to design of Charles Barry Jr. Now a largely demolished ruin. Surviving today is the Palladian library outbuilding, visible to the left, built by Lord Rolle's grandfather John Rolle (died 1730). The contemporaneous orangery behind it also survives, both now the property of the Landmark Trust. Published in Morris, Rev. F.O. Picturesque Views of Seats of Noblemen & Gentlemen of Great Britain & Ireland, London, 1880

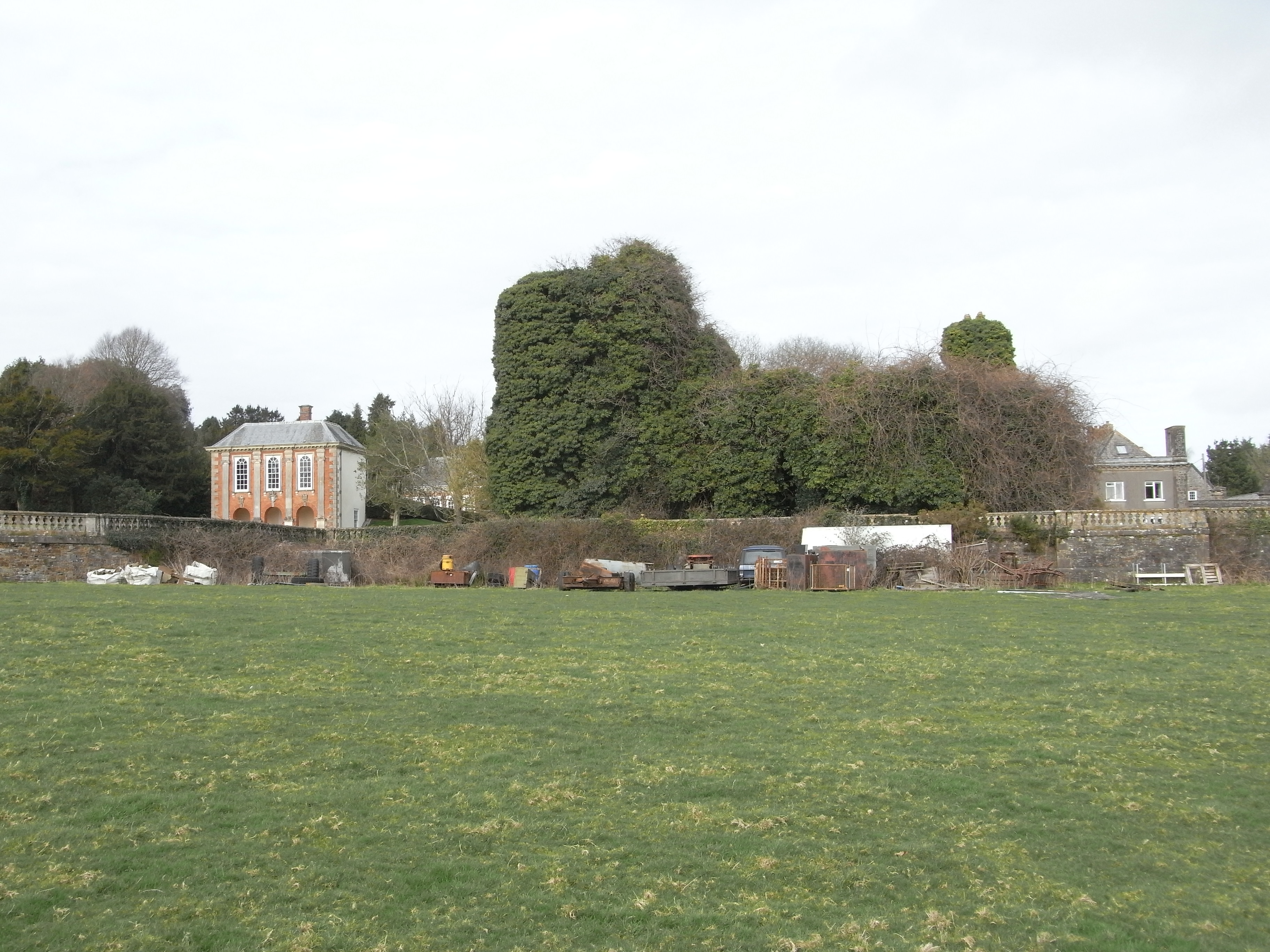
The ivy-covered ruins of Stevenstone House in 2012. Hoskins described it in 1954 as "A villainously ugly house whose present dereliction need bring no tears", and "An ugly ruin in a naked and devastated park". To the left is the Palladian Library Room and behind it the Orangery, built c. 1715–30

Stevenstone is a former manor within the parish of St Giles in the Wood, near Great Torrington, North Devon. It was the chief seat of the Rolle family, one of the most influential and wealthy of Devon families, from c. 1524 until 1907. The Rolle estates as disclosed by the Return of Owners of Land, 1873 (corrected by Bateman, 1883) comprised 55,592 acres producing an annual gross income of £47,170, and formed the largest estate in Devon, followed by the Duke of Bedford's estate centred on Tavistock comprising 22,607 with an annual gross value of nearly £46,000.

From the Glorious Revolution of 1688 to the Reform Act 1832 the county parliamentary representatives were chosen effectively from only ten great families, mostly territorial magnates. The three most dominant of these were the Bampfyldes of Poltimore House and North Molton, the Courtenays of Powderham Castle, and the Rolles of Stevenstone and Bicton. The Rolles were not from the mediaeval aristocracy as were the Courtenays, but were descended from an able lawyer and administrator of the Tudor era, as were the Russells, later Earls and Dukes of Bedford. Both Russells and Rolles acquired much former monastic land in Devon following the dissolution of the monasteries. Indeed, the Rolles were in the opinion of Hoskins (1954) "second only to the Russells in the extent of their monastic and other lands and in time were to surpass them".

In 1669 Sir John Rolle (died 1706), KB of Stevenstone had an annual income of £6,000 making him "one of the richest gentlemen in the country". He died in 1706 seized of more than 40 manors in Devon.

The family built several different houses on the same site known as Stevenstone House, the last Victorian version of which was built between 1868 and 1872. It was significantly reduced in size soon after 1912 and then after 1931 it was gradually demolished piecemeal for building materials.

== Descent of the manor ==
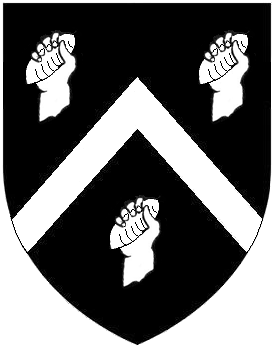
Arms of Stefenston as given by Tristram Risdon in his "Notebook" (c. 1630): Sable, a chevron between three dexter hands clenched couped at the wrist in each a purse (should be flintstone or stone) argent. Risdon was uncertain of the charge and placed a question mark against the word "purse". These appear to be canting arms, the act of a grasping hand suggests possession and if the owner of the hand be given the name "Steven" this suggests "Steven's stone". If the spirit of rebuses be followed, the higher the absurdity of the device the more acceptable. George Rolle (died 1552), the 16th-century purchaser of the estate, adopted this charge as his crest, extended to a cubit arm vested, as can be seen on the Library Room at Stevenstone built by John Rolle Walter (died 1779). John Rolle, 1st Baron Rolle (died 1842) changed the stone into a canting roll of parchment, as is shown in the stained glass window on the grand staircase at Bicton House, and the monument of Samuel Rolle (1669–1735) of Hudscott in Chittlehampton Church shows a baton. The badge of the hunt class destroyer HMS Stevenstone named after the Rolle family's fox-hunt substituted in the hand a hunting horn

John Prince in his "Worthies of Devon" gives the descent of Stevenstone as follows, based on the work of the Devon topographer Tristram Risdon, himself born within the parish of St Giles, at Winscott House. The earliest recorded holder of the manor was Michael de Stephans, who granted it to Richard Basset, the father of Elias Basset, who granted it to Walter de la Lay, or Ley. His descendant John de Lay changed his name to John de Stephenston. The overlord who was then a later Elias Basset, lord of the manor of Beaupier in Wales, released all his interest in Stevenstone to John de Stevenstone.

He was followed by another John, Walter and John de Stephenston. The latter left a daughter Elizabeth de Stephenston his sole heiress, who brought the manor by marriage to her husband Grant of Westlegh, near Bideford. Grant was himself also lacking in male progeny and left two daughters joint heiresses, one of whom married Monk of Potheridge, whilst the other married a member of the Moyle family, who received Stevenstone as his wife's share of the inheritance. He made it his chief residence, and Prince suggests, on the basis of Tristram Risdon's assertion, that his descendant Sir Walter Moyle, a Justice of the King's Bench in 1454, was born here.

=== Rolle ===
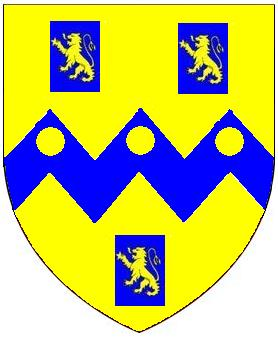
Arms of Rolle: Or, on a fesse dancetté between three billets azure each charged with a lion rampant of the first three bezants

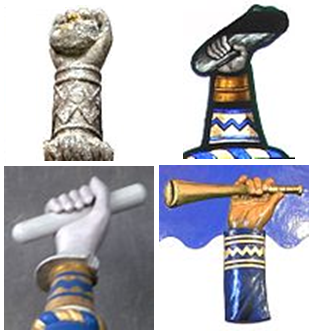
Various forms of the Rolle crest, the standard form of which is: A cubit arm erect vested or charged with a fess indented double cotised azure in the hand a flint-stone proper. Top left: Library Room, Stevenstone (with flint-stone); top right: Stained glass window, Bicton House (with roll of parchment); bottom left: Chittlehampton Church (with baton); bottom right: Barnstaple Guildhall (badge of HMS Stevenstone, with tinctures reversed, double cottised and with hunting horn). It was also used, grasping either a roll or a palm frond, as the badge of the Royal North Devon Hussars, the predecessor regiment of which had been raised largely by Lord Rolle

George Rolle (died 1552), MP, the founder of that family in Devon, purchased the estate not long before 1524. He was probably born in Dorset, rose to prominence as a lawyer in London, and had as clients several monastic houses in Devon. One of his most prominent clients was Arthur Plantagenet, 1st Viscount Lisle (died 1542), whom he served as legal counsel until the latter's death. He served as MP for Barnstaple in 1542 and again in 1545.

The male descendants up to 1842 of George Rolle included about twenty members of parliament. In 1842 died the last of the male line, John Rolle, 1st Baron Rolle (1750–1842), descended from George Rolle's second son George Rolle (died 1573) of the manor of Marrais in the parish of Week St Mary in Cornwall, which manor had been procured for him by his father who had obtained the wardship of Margaret of Marrais and bequeathed the same in his will to his son George, who became her husband.

The descendants of George Rolle the patriarch's eldest son John Rolle (died 1570) failed in the male line in 1642 on the death of the infant John Rolle (1638–1642). Stevenstone and several other manors which had by then been accumulated by purchase and inheritance from heiresses, passed eventually to Sir John Rolle (1626–1706), the grandson of George Rolle (died 1573) of Marrais. Some of the estates of the patriarch's fourth son Henry Rolle of Heanton Satchville, Petrockstowe, also reverted to the line of George Rolle of Marais on the failure in the male line in 1747 on the death of Samuel Rolle of Hudscott, Chittlehampton.

==== Descent in Rolle family ====
- George Rolle (died 1552), MP. Purchased Stevenstone pre-1524.
- John Rolle (1522–1570), eldest son, husband of Margaret Ford (died 1570) commemorated by monumental brass in St Giles Church.

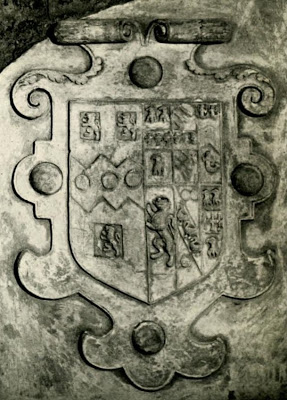
1602 escutcheon within a strapwork surround, showing the arms of Sir Henry Rolle (1545–1625) impaling Watts, of 6 quarters, the family of his first wife. Abbots Lodge, Cathedral Close, Exeter (destroyed in WW II)

- Sir Henry Rolle (1545–1625), eldest son, married firstly Elizabeth Watts, daughter and heiress of Roger Watts of Somerset, secondly a Fortescue, daughter of John Fortescue (1525–1595) of Fallapit, East Allington by his wife Honor Speccot (died 1606), whose monumental brasses exist in East Allington Church. His Exeter townhouse was the "Abbot's Lodge" (destroyed in 1942 during World War II bombing), in Cathedral Close within the precincts of Exeter Cathedral. He made alterations to that house and added decorative heraldic plaster escutcheons dated 1602, one of which showed Rolle impaling Watts, of six quarters (1st & 6th Watts: Argent, on a fesse vert between three eagle's heads erased sable as many crosses sarcelly of the first, the arms of Sir John Watts (died 1616), Lord Mayor of London in 1606) the other Rolle impaling Fortescue. The house had been the townhouse of the Abbot of Buckfast Abbey, which Abbey and much of its lands, including the Abbot's Lodge, had been acquired in 1545 by the patriarch George Rolle (d.1552) following the dissolution of the monasteries. It had been used by George Rolle as his townhouse, by the name of "Buckfast Place" and was the place of his death in 1552. In 1609 he purchased from William Howard, 3rd Baron Howard of Effingham (1577–1615) several of the larger former holdings of Barnstaple Priory in Pilton and Bradiford, whose family had held the lands since the Dissolution of the Monasteries.
- Denys Rolle (1614–1638), grandson. Sheriff of Devon 1636, one of Prince's Worthies of Devon, in which he is described as "The darling of his country in his time, adorn'd with all the desirable qualities that make a compleat gentleman. He was, though young, of a ready wit, a generous mind, and a large soul." Monument and effigy in the Rolle Mausoleum, Old Bicton Church. Son of Sir Henry Rolle (died 1617) (son of Elizabeth Watts and who predeceased his father), by his wife Anne Denys, heiress of Bicton.
- John Rolle (1638–1642), only son by his wife Margaret Poulett. Died an infant.
- Henry Rolle (1605–1647) of Beam House, Great Torrington. First cousin of Sir Henry Rolle (died 1617).
- Sir John Rolle (1626–1706), KB, MP. Second cousin, grandson of George Rolle of Marrais, Cornwall, second son of the patriarch George Rolle (died 1552). Married his cousin Florence Rolle, sister of the infant John Rolle (died 1642). Died seised of 40 manors in Devon, with an annual income in 1669 of £6,000. In 1669 he entertained Cosimo III de' Medici, Grand Duke of Tuscany (1642–1723) at Abbot's Lodge, his Exeter townhouse, who in the detailed record of his visit described Rolle as "One of the richest gentlemen in the country".
- Robert Rolle (1677–1710), MP, grandson, son of John Rolle (died 1689) who predeceased his father.
- John Rolle (1679–1730), MP, brother. Married Isabella Walter.
- Henry Rolle, 1st Baron Rolle (1708–1750), eldest son.
- John Rolle Walter (1712–1779), MP, brother.
- Denys Rolle (1725–1797), MP, brother. Founded colonies in Palatka, Florida and Exuma, Bahamas. Inherited Hudscott from distant cousin Samuel Rolle (died 1747), descended from Henry Rolle of Heanton Satchville, Petrockstowe, 4th son of the patriarch George Rolle (died 1552).
- John Rolle, 1st Baron Rolle (1750–1842), MP, son. Last of the male line, died without progeny.
  - Mark Rolle (1835–1907), born Hon. Mark Trefusis, adoptive heir, nephew of Lord Rolle's wife Louisa Trefusis, a daughter of Baron Clinton.

== Forms of Stevenstone House ==
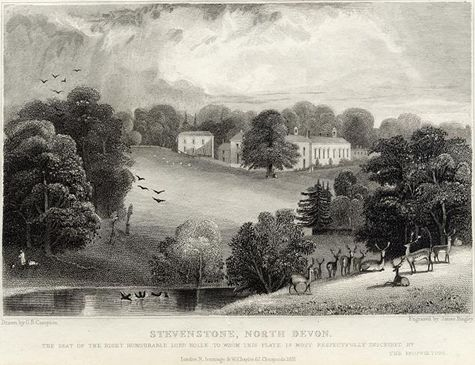
"Stevenstone, North Devon, the seat of the Right Honourable Lord Rolle". Drawn by G.B. Campion, engraved by James Bingley, published by R.Jennings & W. Chaplin, 62 Cheapside, London, 1831. The Library Room is visible to the left

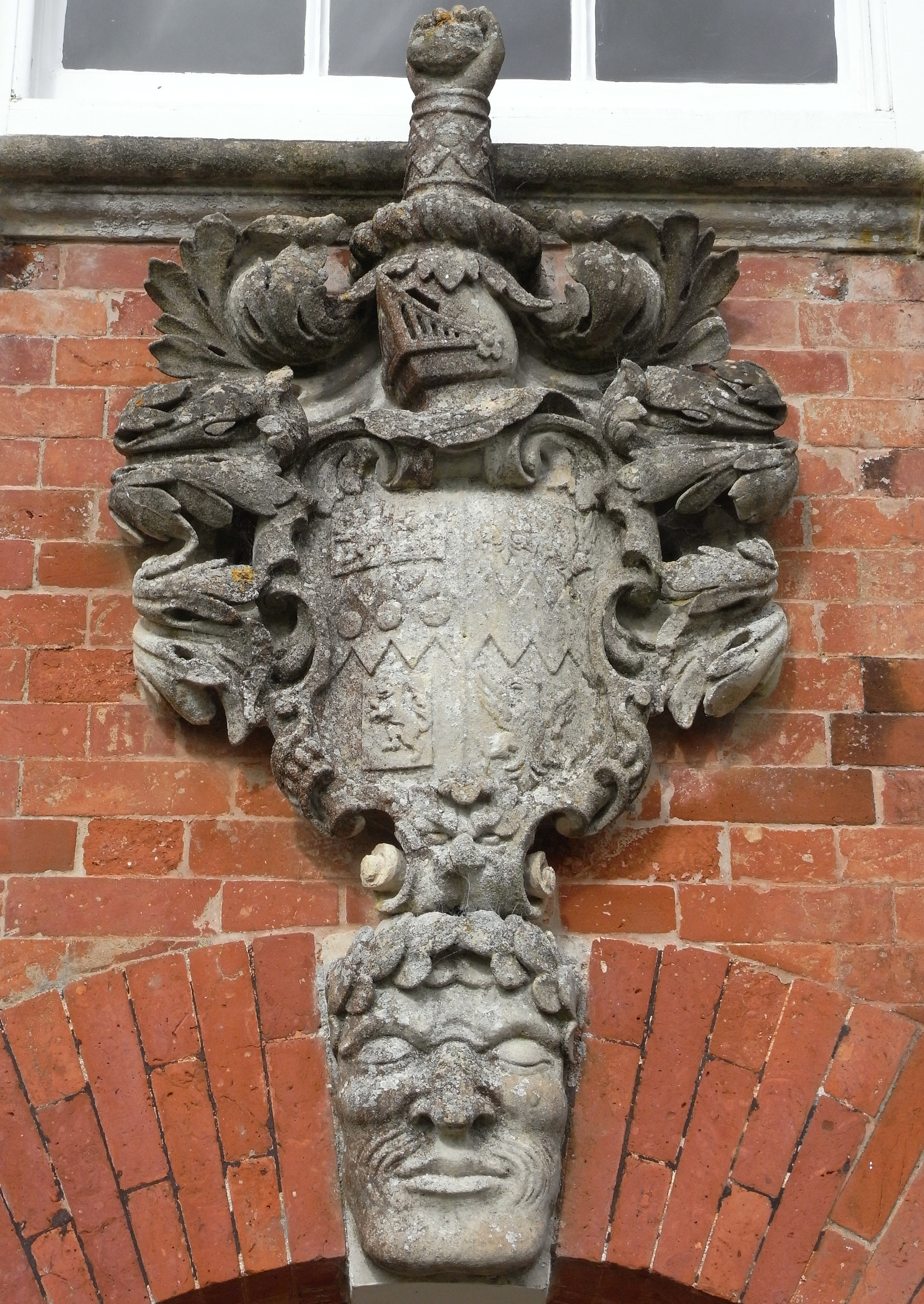
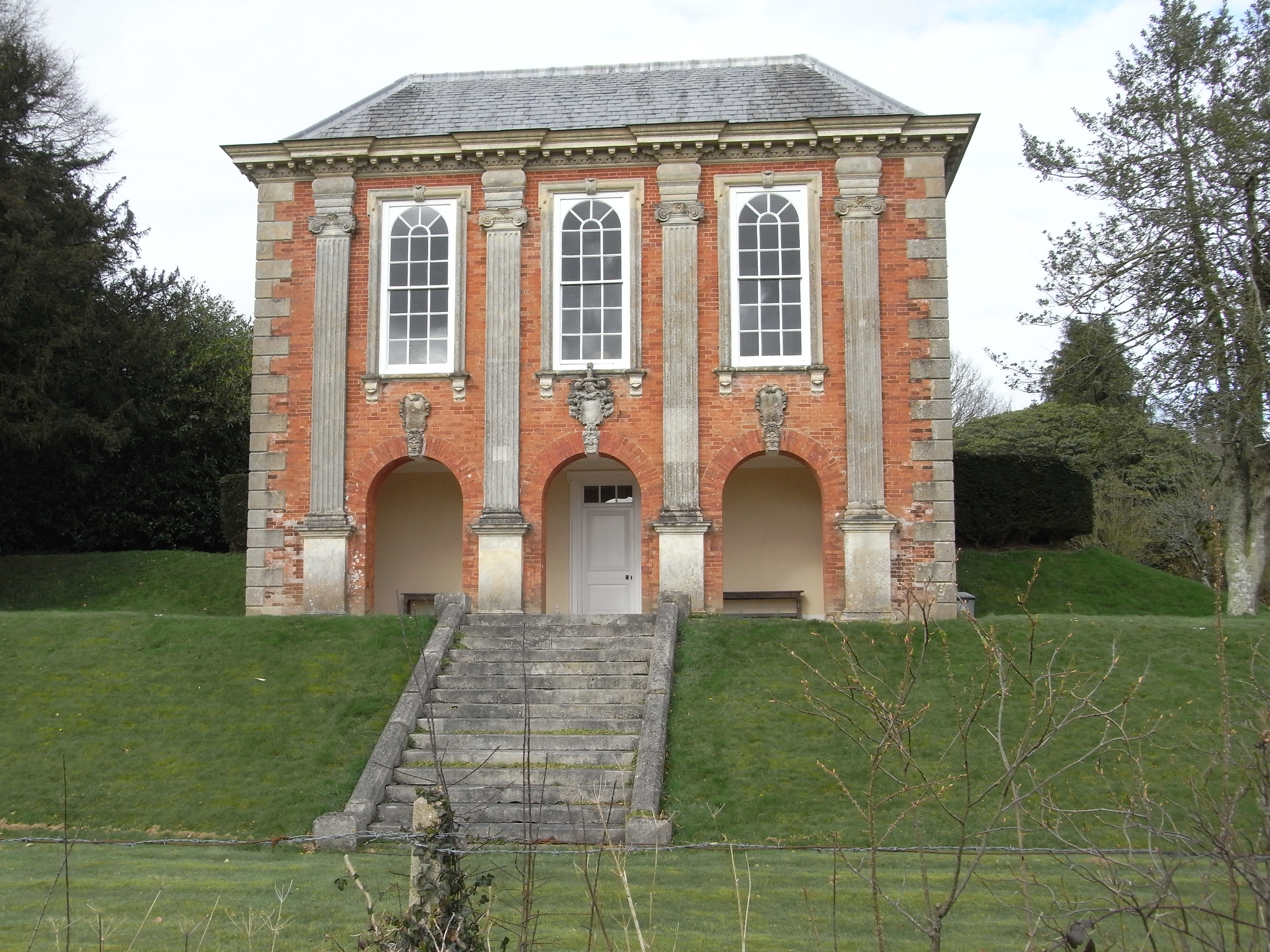
Left: Sculpted stone heraldic achievement c. 1715–1730 above central arch keystone on the surviving Palladian library (right) at Stevenstone, built by John Rolle (1679–1730), father of John Rolle Walter, showing on an escutcheon the arms of Rolle impaling Walter, the family of his wife Isabella Walter. The crest is a dexter cubit arm holding in the hand a flint. The crest of his elder brother Robert Rolle (1677–1710), MP, holds in its hand a roll of parchment, as can be seen above the portico of the Mercantile Exchange (or Queen Anne's Walk), Barnstaple, on which he erected the statue of Queen Anne in 1708. The crest in Chittlehampton Church, of Rolle of Hudscott, holds a baton

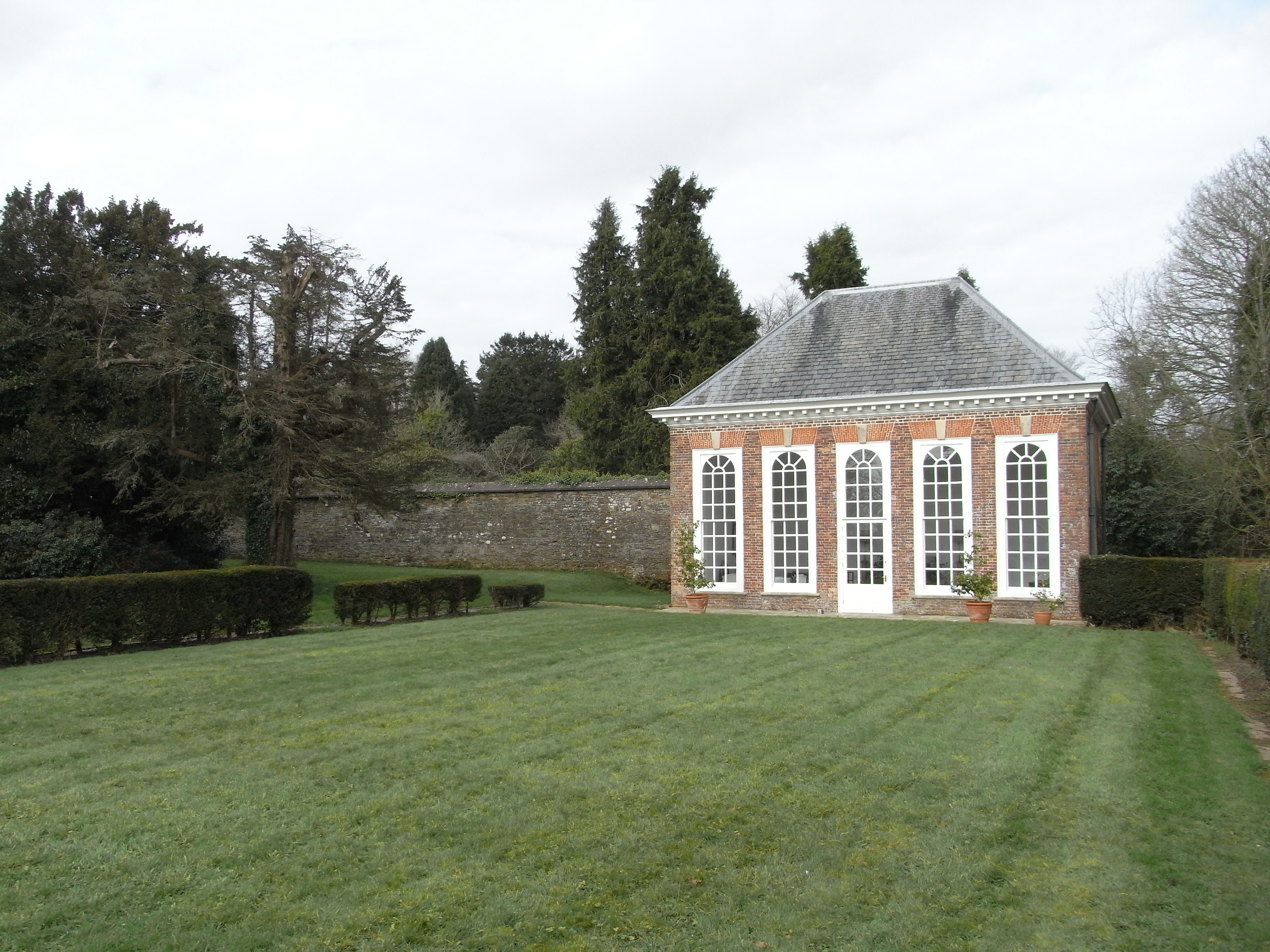
The Orangery, Stevenstone House, St Giles in the Wood, Devon. Built by John Rolle (1679–1730), MP, c. 1715–1730. Showing also remnant of pinetum

The earliest record of the form of the manor house is that given by John Leland (died 1552), who wrote : "There is an hamlet longging to Tarington toun not a mile by est from Tarington coullid S. Gilys, wher George Rolles hath buildid a right fair house of bryke". It is said by Hoskins (1954) to have been the first brick-built house in Devon. A letter survives dated 1539 from George Rolle to his illustrious client's wife Lady Lisle "from my poor house" of Stevenstone.

Two Palladian outbuildings serving as Orangery and "Library Room" were built next to the house by John Rolle (1679–1730), MP, and the Library shows above the keystone of its central arch the arms of Rolle impaling the arms of the Walter Baronets of Sarsden, Oxfordshire, the family of his wife Isabella Walter (died 1734). Hoskins states that the manor house itself was rebuilt or remodelled sometime in the 18th century, Pevsner states c. 1709, perhaps therefore at the same time as the building of the outbuildings. An engraving of this Georgian house survives, by James Bingley, published in 1831.

== Victorian re-build ==
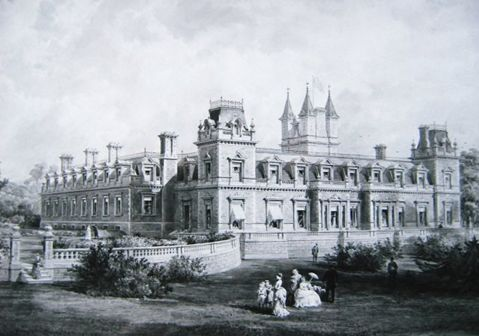
Stevenstone House in 1872. The high tower is clearly shown

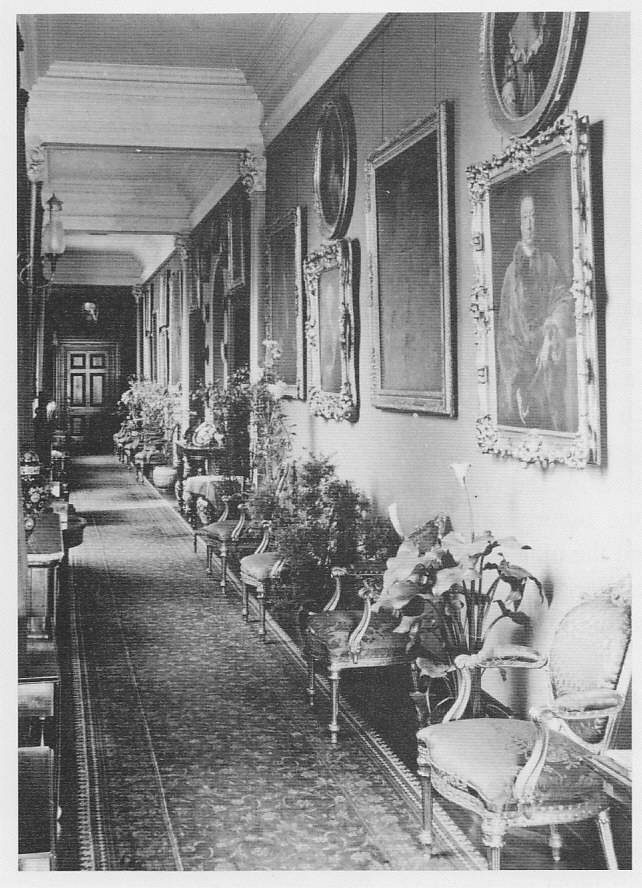
Corridor in Stevenstone House, c. 1907–12, photo from auction catalogue published between 1907 (death of Hon. Mark Rolle) and 1912 (purchase by Capt. Clemson). The arrangement is as left by Mark Rolle. Visible in the right foreground is the portrait of John Rolle Walter (1712–1779) of Stevenstone, painted c. 1753 by Pompeo Batoni (1708–1787) & purchased in 2008 for £300,000 by Royal Albert Memorial Museum, Exeter. A replica hangs in Great Torrington Town Hall

The house was demolished in 1868 by Hon. Mark Rolle (died 1907) who erected in its place between 1868 and 1872 to the design of Charles Barry Jr. (died 1900) a Victorian mansion in the "French Chateau style" (or "Franco-Italian style" as it was termed by a contemporary issue of Building News,) widely considered today to have been a building of little architectural merit. It may be compared, but in simpler form, to the Rothschild family's slightly later Waddesdon Manor, which was however designed by a French architect. It sat within a deer park of 370 acres containing a large quantity of large and valuable trees. In the opinion of Hoskins writing in 1954: "Mark Rolle rebuilt the house again in the worst style of the time. The richest man in Devon built himself the ugliest house".

== Sale and demolition ==
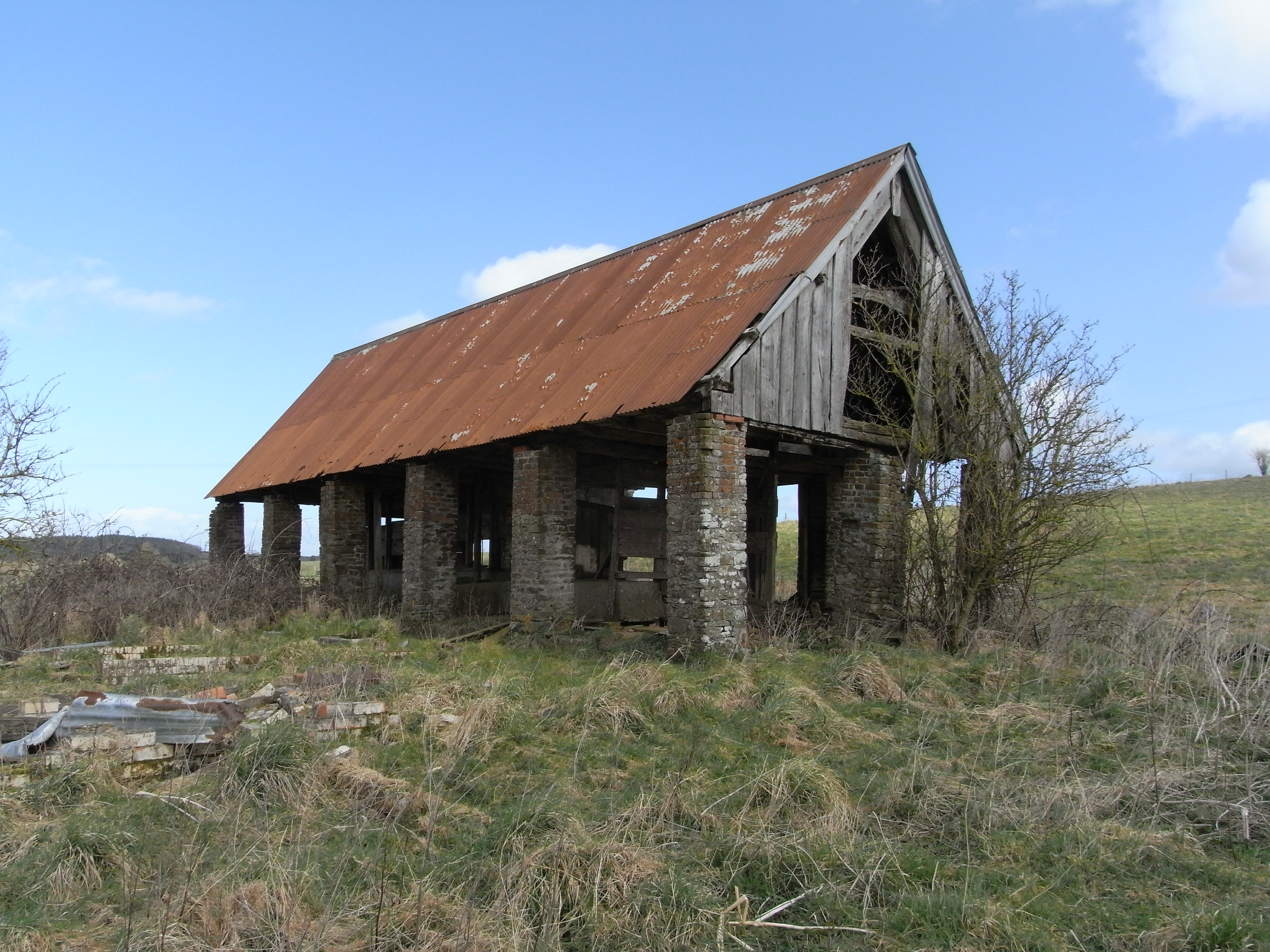
Deer shelter, stated by Pevsner to date from c. 1700, in the former deer park of Stevenstone House. It is visible across a valley from the terrace of the house. It was advertised for sale by a local estate agent in 2012

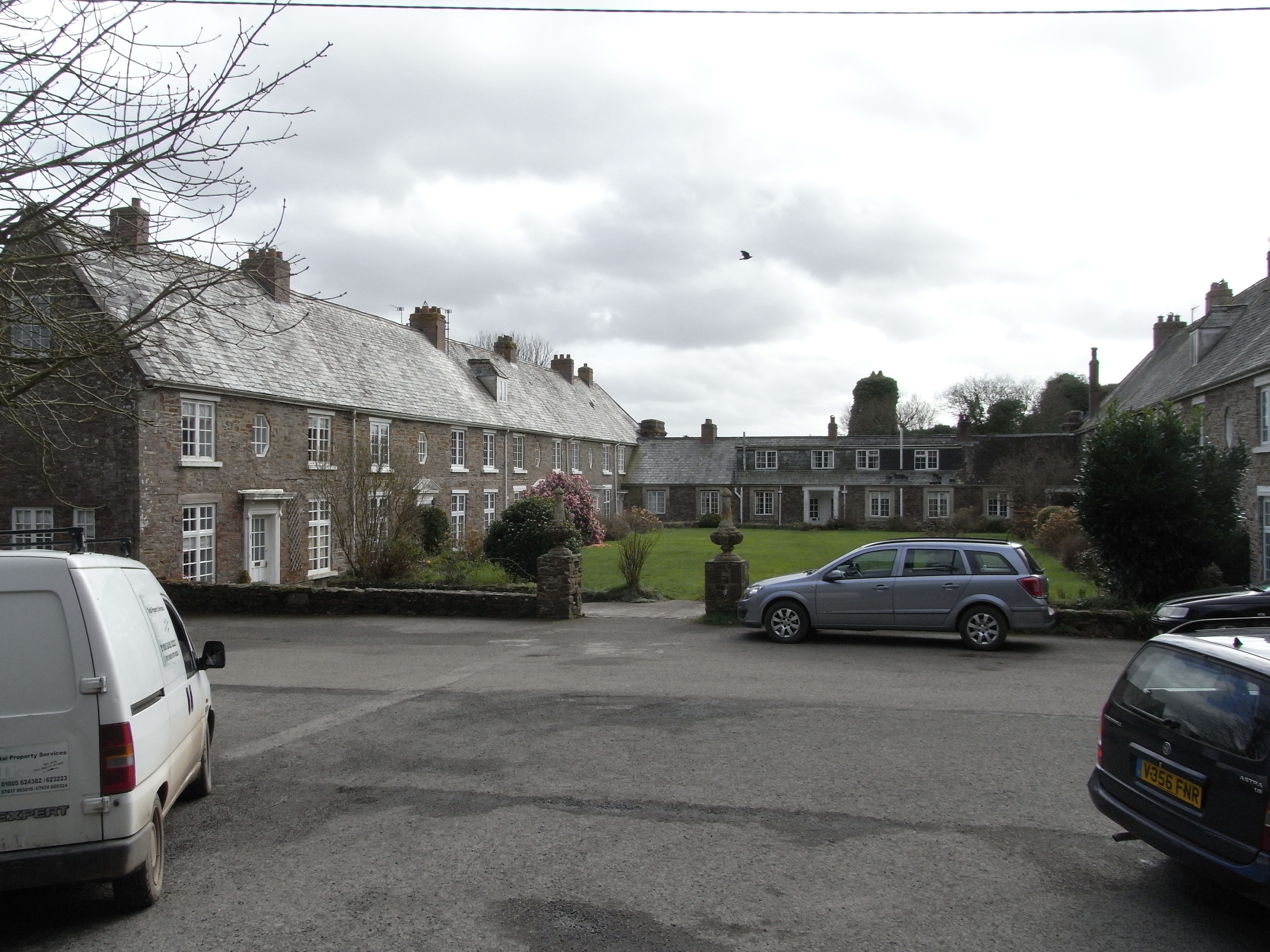
Stable block, Stevenstone House, converted c. 1950 into terraced housing. The ivy-covered ruins of Stevenstone House are visible in the background

=== Trefusis, Baron Clinton ===
Following the death of Mark Rolle in 1907, the Rolle estates, extending to about 55,000 acres, which had been held by him as life tenant under the will of his aunt's husband John Rolle, 1st Baron Rolle (1750–1842), descended to his heir male his nephew Charles John Robert Hepburn-Stuart-Forbes-Trefusis, 21st Baron Clinton (1863–1957), of Huish

=== Clemson ===
Lord Clinton sold Stevenstone by auction in 1912 to Captain John Oliver Clemson (1882–1915) and his wife Mary McKinnon, a wealthy heiress. Clemson was born 30 May 1882 in Crumpsall, Manchester the elder son of John Henry Clemson (1856–1889) of Parkside, Altrincham, Cheshire by his wife Sara Jane Oliver (b. 1855). He had one brother and four sisters.

In 1891 aged 8 he was living with his widowed mother at Brookfield House, Bury Old Road, Broughton, Salford. He attended Windermere College Preparatory School, in the parish of St Mary's Church Applethwaite, Windermere, in which church his name appears on a memorial tablet "Boys of the Old College who fell in the Great War". He later attended Sedbergh School between 1897 and July 1900. In the 1901 census he was residing at Red House, Windermere, as a boarder in a preparatory school with three other pupils. He matriculated at Exeter College, Oxford in 1901. He described himself in about 1909 as a "Gentleman farmer of Peagham (Barton), Torrington", which was one of the farms of the Stevenstone estate, about 3/4 mile north of Stevenstone House. On 10 July 1909 he applied for a commission in the Royal North Devon Hussars, and was commissioned as Second Lieutenant on 17 July 1909.

In 1911, unmarried and aged 28, he was staying at Bydown House, Swimbridge, near Barnstaple, as a guest of Robert Jameson and his wife Margaret (née McKinnon), who was the brother-in-law of Mary McKinnon, also then residing in the house, aged 28 and born in Calcutta, Clemson's future wife. In 1912 at Paddington, London, he married Mary McKinnon, 3rd daughter of the late John McKinnon of 10 Hyde Park Gardens, London. They had one daughter. The new owners demolished about half of the east front of the house including the main tower and one corner tower, to make it more manageable, presumably due to the war-time lack of domestic staff. He was Master of the Stevenstone Foxhounds.

Captain Clemson was mobilised on 4 August 1914 and sailed for Gallipoli on 24 September 1914, as part of the South Western Mounted Brigade, during which campaign he died from wounds on 9 December 1915. He is remembered by a monument in St Giles' Church inscribed as follows: "In Loving Memory of John Oliver Clemson, of Stevenstone, Captain Royal North Devon Hussars, who was killed in action in Gallipoli 9th December 1915, aged 33. A great and glorious thing it is to die for one's country". He is recorded on the Exeter College, Oxford Roll of Honour, and also on the Altrincham & District Roll of Honour.

His widow Mary erected a bronze memorial tablet in the church naming the twelve men of the parish who had lost their lives in World War I, reported on in the local press thus: "Following the unveiling by Mrs. Clemson, and the dedication by the Vicar (Rev. C. Walker), the "Last Post" and Reveille were sounded on cornets, and the effect was grand in its solemnity. Special hymns and psalms were sung by the choir, and the Vicar based his address on the significance of the memorial". His grave is in the Lala Baba Cemetery in Turkey. Mrs Clemson remarried to Col. B.C. James, 8th Devon Regiment, awarded the DSO on 1 January 1917, and remained at Stevenstone.

=== Piecemeal disposal ===
On 26 September 1930 the estate of Stevenstone was offered for sale by auction, including 665 acres. The property was auctioned again in May 1931, but with only 17 acres and was then described as comprising four reception rooms, 27 bed and dressing rooms and eight bathrooms. It failed to sell at £3,000. A further 300 acres were sold separately.

In the summer of 1931 the house and some of the parkland was purchased by Mr George Millman, the tenant of Winscott Barton (the ancient home of Tristram Risdon), by then part of the Stevenstone estate, within the parish of St Giles. He immediately offered it for sale as building materials prior to complete demolition, split into 609 lots. Lot 609 was the residual shell of the house itself after all else had been sold in the previous lots. Mr Millman however changed his intention against selling, but by then the auction could not be stopped. He bought-in as many lots as he could, and the house continued for a few more years, reduced in size again by the demolition of the servants' wing which connected the house to the stable block.

The house was still habitable during World War II as troops were stationed there, namely the Warwickshire Regiment and later American troops. After the war Mr Millman finally sold the house to Mr Melville, who contrary to his stated intention at the time of purchase, proceeded to demolish it. He used much of the stone to convert the stable block into terraced housing and built several smaller houses and bungalows around it and in the former walled kitchen garden.

In 1970 the vestigial ruins of Stevenstone House were purchased by Mr Parnell, who had purchased the Deer Park in the 1931 sale and had built a bungalow next to the ruins. Although the adjacent detached Library Room and the Orangery were granted Grade II* Listing on 4 October 1960, the ruins of Stevenstone House received much later on 16 February 1989 a Grade II Listing, offering them protection from demolition, but they have continued to deteriorate from adverse weather and are as at 2012 totally covered in ivy.

== Stevenstone today ==
Around the ruined house exists in 2012 a hamlet of settlement, comprising the terraced houses of the former stable block, several bungalows within the walled kitchen garden, other new houses and the Torrington Farmers Hunt Kennels, previously the Stevenstone Hunt in the days of Mark Rolle. The Palladian outbuildings of the Library Room and the Orangery were purchased in July 1978 by the Landmark Trust and were restored and converted into revenue-producing rental accommodation.

== See also ==
- HMS Stevenstone (L16)

== Sources ==
- Vivian, Lt.Col. J.L., (Ed.) The Visitations of the County of Devon: Comprising the Heralds' Visitations of 1531, 1564 & 1620, Exeter, 1895, pp. 652–656, pedigree of Rolle of Stevenstone
- Hoskins, W.G., A New Survey of England: Devon, London, 1959 (first published 1954)
- Lauder, Rosemary, Vanished Houses of North Devon, Tiverton, 2005, Stevenstone House pp. 7–20
- Pevsner, Nikolaus & Cherry, Bridget, The Buildings of England: Devon, London, 2004
- Prince, John, (1643–1723) The Worthies of Devon, 1810 edition, London, pp. 706–708, biography of Denys Rolle (1614–1638)
