= John Curteys (MP for Lostwithiel) =

Member of the Parliament of England

John Curteys or Courteys was a Member of Parliament for Lostwithiel in 1406, 1411, and May 1413. He was Mayor of Lostwithiel from 1389 to 1390. He was the son of Thomas Curteys and was the brother of Tristram Curteys, both Members of Parliament for Lostwithiel.
