= Lisle Papers =

The Lisle Papers are the correspondence received in Calais between 1533 and 1540 by Arthur Plantagenet, 1st Viscount Lisle (c.1480-1542), Lord Deputy of Calais, an illegitimate son of King Edward IV and an uncle of King Henry VIII, and by his wife, Honor Plantagenet, Viscountess Lisle (born Honor Grenville and formerly the wife of Sir John Bassett (d.1529) of Umberleigh in Devon), from several servants, courtiers, royal officials, friends, children and other relatives. They are an important source of information on domestic life in the Tudor age and of life at the court of Henry VIII.

Although long available as transcriptions in the Letters and Papers of Henry VIII, they were first published as an annotated collection in 1981 as a six-volume edition, titled "The Lisle Letters", and an abridged selection in one volume was published in 1983, both edited by Muriel St. Clare Byrne.

== Description ==
The entire collection, now housed within the State Papers of the United Kingdom at the National Archives at Kew, comprises about 3,000 documents, ranging in date from 1 January 1533 to 31 December 1540. During this time Lord Lisle was based at Calais whilst performing his office of Lord Deputy of Calais. The correspondence is between Lord and Lady Lisle and their family, acquaintances at court, retainers, and servants. The main correspondent was John Husee, Lord Lisle's London agent.

== Physical location ==
Following Lisle's arrest for alleged treason in 1540, as was usual in such cases, all his papers in the Staple Inn in Calais, his official residence, were confiscated and placed in the Tower of London. It is one of only three such collections to have survived, and it's the only one still largely intact and not amalgamated with similar documents, the others being the papers of Thomas Cromwell (State Papers, Henry VIII, SP 1) and the small collection of Lord Darcy's papers. A few further documents from the correspondence of the Lisles survived outside the collection originally deposited in the Tower and are contained in the Cotton, Harleian and Royal Manuscripts in the British Library. Some also were transferred to the Thomas Cromwell collection. The papers deposited in the Tower were subsequently transferred to the Chapter House of Westminster Abbey, in the category "Treasury of the Receipt of the Exchequer", and remained there until 1832 when the Home Office ordered their removal to the care of the State Paper Commission at the State Paper Office, amalgamated with the Public Record Office in 1852, which was recently re-founded as the National Archives. They are held today at the National Archives in the category "State Papers Foreign and Domestic, Henry VIII, SP3, Lisle Papers"

== Editions ==
Summaries of The Lisle Letters were published between 1862 and 1930 scattered within the 33 volumes of the "Calendar of Letters and Papers, Foreign and Domestic, of Henry VIII" edited by J. S. Brewer, J. Gairdner and R H Brodie (London 1862-1930). In the early 1930s, Muriel St. Clare Byrne, then a young student of Tudor England, started an exhaustive study of the approximately 3,000 original documents then at the Public Record Office comprising the Lisle Papers. Her work in transcribing, annotating and arranging the letters lasted several decades and was not published until 1981. Two editions have been published as follows:

- Byrne, Muriel St. Clare (Ed.), The Lisle Letters, 6 Vols., University of Chicago Press, 1981, ISBN 9780226088013. (Transcripts of 1,677 documents).
- Byrne, Muriel St. Clare & Boland, Bridget (Eds.), The Lisle Letters: an Abridgement, with foreword by Hugh Trevor-Roper, University of Chicago Press, 1983, ISBN 9780226088006

== Sources ==
- National Archives, State Papers Foreign and Domestic, Henry VIII, SP3, Lisle Papers
- Slavin, Arthur J., The Lisle Letters and the Tudor State, published in The Sewanee Review (University of the South), Vol. 90, No. 1, Winter, 1982, pp. 135 et seq.
- Elton, G.R., Viscount Lisle at Calais, London Review of Books, Vol.3, No. 13, 16 July 1981
