= Way, St Giles in the Wood =

Historic estate in Devon, England

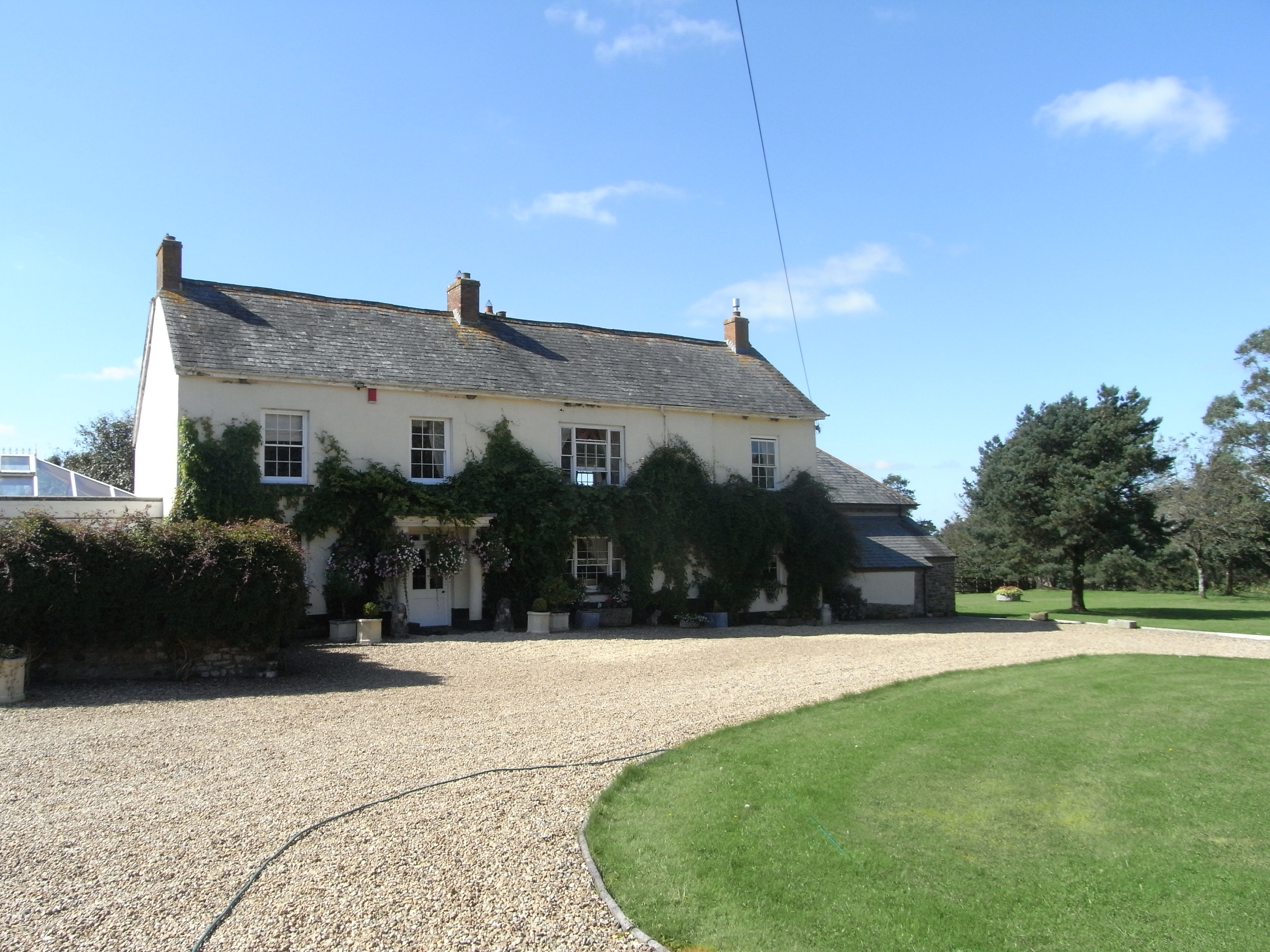
Way Barton, St Giles in the Wood. The mediaeval mansion house formerly standing on this site was the ancient seat of the Pollard family

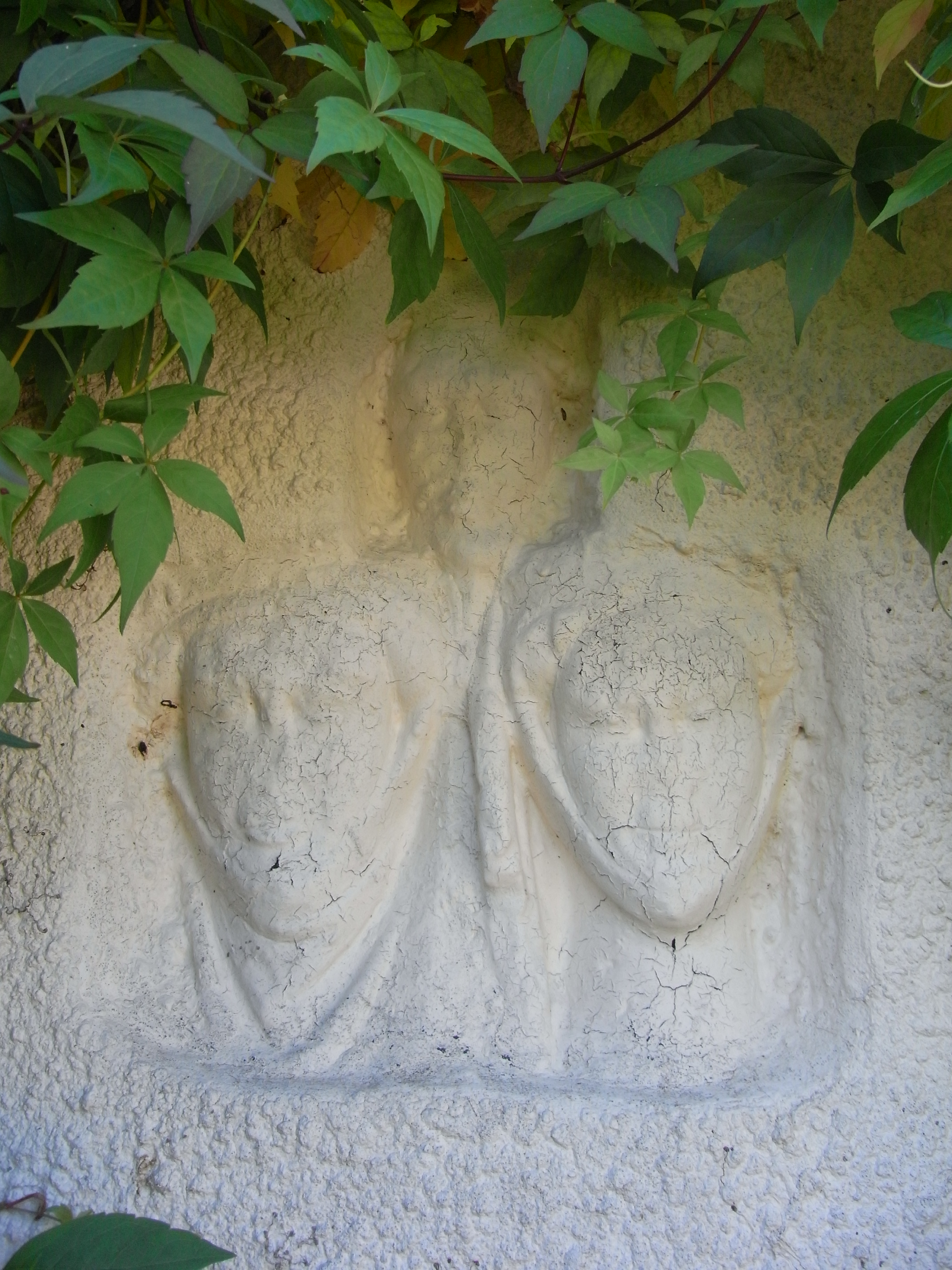
Sculpted reliefs of three faces, c. 1300, now set into wall of facade of Way Barton, St Giles in the Wood parish, Devon. Two females wearing wimples below, with a mustachioed male apparently wearing a coronet, above

Way is a historic estate in the parish of St Giles in the Wood, Devon. It is situated about 2 miles (3.2 km) north-east of the village of St Giles in the Wood and about 4 miles (6.4 km) north-east of the town of Great Torrington. It was described by Hoskins (1959) as "the fons et origo of the mighty tribe of Pollard" and had been acquired by them from the de la Way family at some time before 1242.

One of the earliest members descended from this family to reach national prominence was Sir Lewis Pollard (c. 1465-1540), Justice of the Common Pleas from 1514 to 1526, of Grilstone, Bishop's Nympton, described by Thomas Fuller (1608-1661) in his Worthies of England as one of several Devonshire men "inundated with a genius to study law".

The former mansion of the Pollards at Way is now represented by the farmhouse known as Way Barton. Reset into the front wall of the house is a stone sculpture dated about 1300 showing the faces of two ladies wearing wimples and above them the smaller face of a man. In 1309 Robert Pollard was granted by the Bishop of Exeter licence to build an oratory at Weye, of which no trace remains in the present house.

== Descent of the estate ==
=== Lord M Way ===
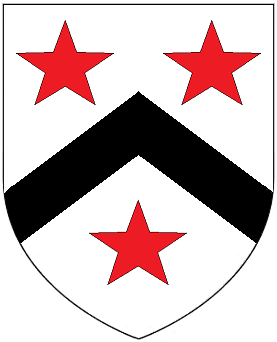
Arms of de la Way: Argent, a chevron sable between three mullets gules (often shown as mullets pierced)

The Devon historian Tristram Risdon (died 1640) (who lived at Winscott in the same parish of St Giles in the Wood) stated Way to have been the residence of the de la Way family during the reign of King John (1199-1216), and to have been granted, during the reign of Edward I (1272-1307), by Walter de la Way, the son of William de la Way, to Walter Pollard, which grant was witnessed by Sir Henry Sully and Sir Thomas Merton.

The arms of de la Way were later quartered by their descendants the Pollard family and by the Davie family (later Davie Baronets of Creedy, Sandford). The usual explanation of this usage of the de la Way arms is as given for example in the 1771 Baronetage of England, by Kimber and Johnson:

"The inhabitants of this seat" (i.e. Way, erroneously said to be situated in the parish of Horwood, another Pollard seat) "and ancestors of this family, were first of all known by the name of De-la-Wey, and the first of them mentioned in their pedigree had coat armour, which hath ever since continued the fame to this family, although their names have diversly been written, De-la-Wey, then Dewy, De-Vie, and afterwards contracted and softened into Davie; unto which variation it was the more subject, for that many hundred years since, one Walter Pollard, matching with the daughter and heir-general of this family, became owner of the said ancient habitation, called Wey, which gave name to the family, as aforefaid, and which, ever since the said marriage, hath continued with the Pollards, who, in respect of that match, do also, at this day, quarter the coat of the Davies".

The family of Davie of Creedy is said by the Devon topographer Rev. Swete (died 1821) to have derived from the family of de Way (Latinised to de Via, of which "Davie" is said to be a corrupted form) of the manor of Way in the parish of St Giles in the Wood, near Great Torrington, Devon. The family of Pollard inherited (or purchased) the manor of Way, which became their fons et origo, and according to Prince, (died 1723) adopted these "de Way"/Davie arms which thenceforth they used either alone or quartered by their own arms of Argent, a chevron sable between three escallops gules. The Pollard family inherited the manor of Horwood from the Cornu family and these de Way mullet arms are visible on their own, without the Pollard escallop arms, on several 17th-century Pollard monuments in Horwood Church.

=== Pollard ===
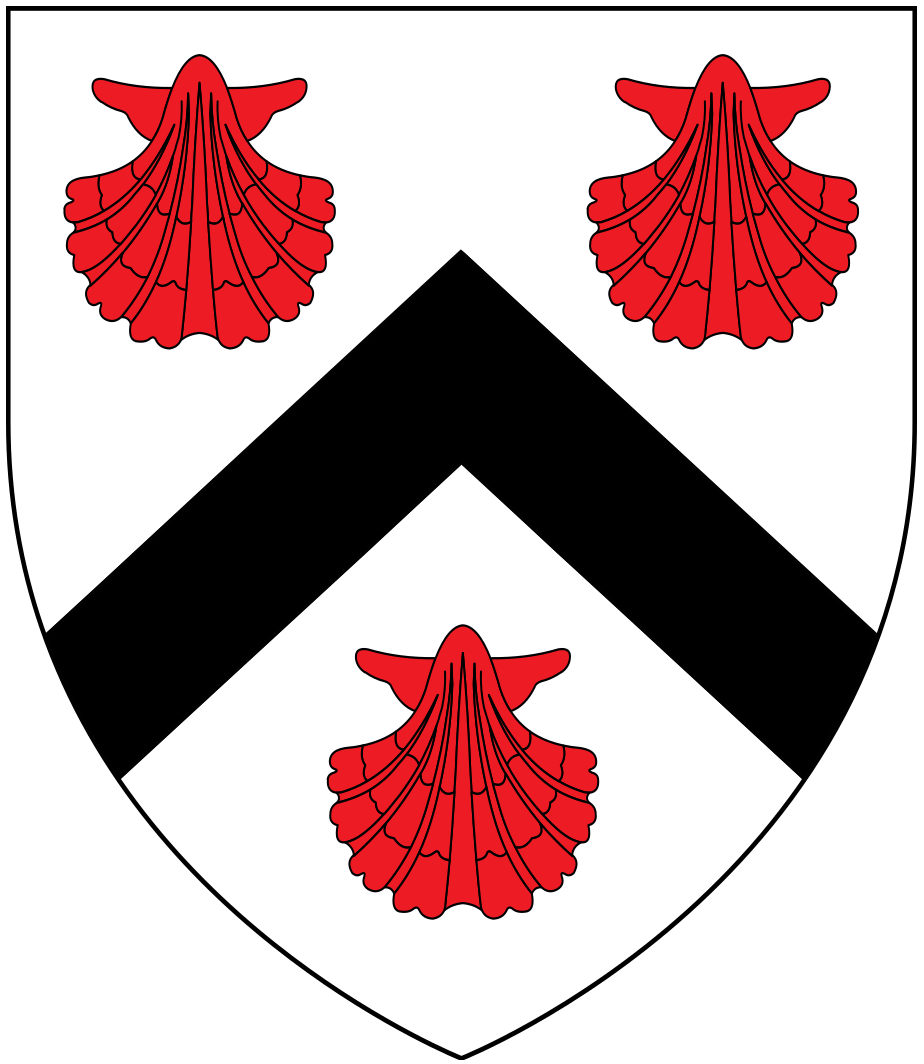
Arms of Pollard: Argent, a chevron sable between three escallops gules. Frequently quartered by Pollard with de way/Davie: Argent, a chevron sable between three mullets gules, which latter arms are used on their own on several Pollard monuments in Horwood Church

Vivian (1895) gave the descent of Way in the Pollard family as follows:

- Walter I Pollard of Way, living 1242
- Walter II Pollard (son) of Way, living 1295
- Joel Pollard (son) of Way, living 1334
- John I Pollard (son) of Way and of Horwood, Devon, who married Emme Doddiscombe, one of the five daughters and co-heiresses of Sir John Doddiscombe of Doddiscombsleigh, near Exeter, and Compton Pole, Devon. According to Prince (1643–1723) an ancient Pollard family inscription formerly existed in Horwood Church, in a window of the so-called "Pollard Aisle" built by that family, as follows:

Orate pro bono statu Johannis Pollard et Emmae uxoris eius qui istam guildam fieri fecerunt (pray for the good position of John Pollard and of Emma his wife who made this guild to come into being)

This evidences their having established a guild in that church. In Prince's opinion it was Horwood not Way which was the earliest devonshire home of the Pollard family. The 3rd son of John Pollard and Emme Doddescombe was Roger Pollard, who founded the Pollard family of Langley, Yarnscombe.

- Walter III Pollard (eldest son and heir) of Way, who married Elizabeth Cornu, a daughter of William I Cornu of Horwood and a sister and co-heiress of William II Cornu of Horwood.

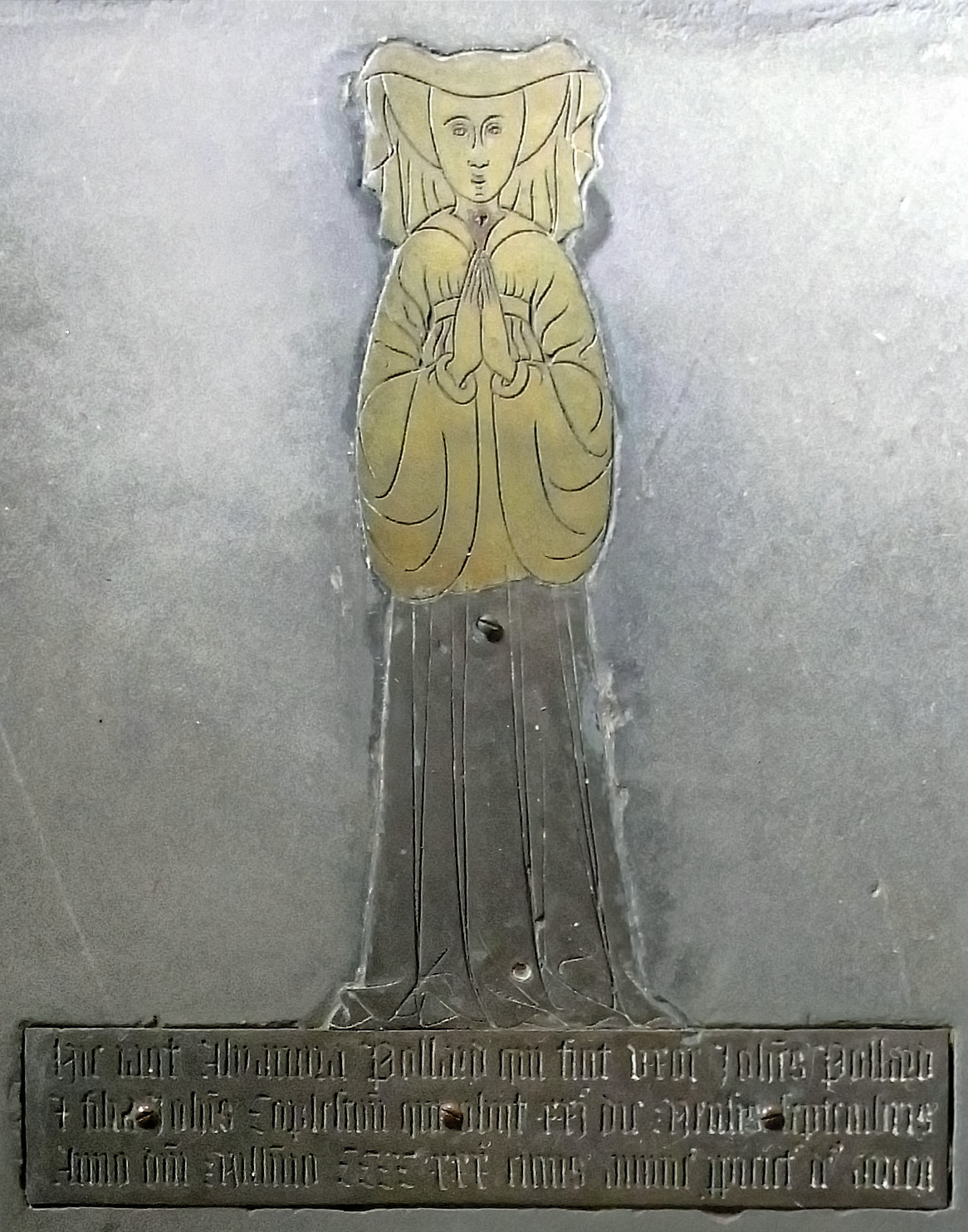
Monumental brass of Alyanora Pollard (née Copleston) (died 1430), grandmother of Sir Lewis Pollard (died 1526). St Giles in the Wood parish church, Devon

- John II Pollard (son) of Way, who married Eleanor Coplestone (died 1430), a daughter of John de Coplestone, a member of the ancient family seated at Copplestone in the parish of Colebroke, Devon. A monumental brass exists in St Giles Church of Alyanora Pollard (died 1430), of which only the original lower half of a female figure has survived, the top half being an accurate modern replacement, with the inscription below it:

Hic jacet Alyanora Pollard qui fuit uxor Joh(ann)is Pollard et filia Joh(ann)is Copleston qui obiit xxi die mensis Septembris Anno d(o)m(in)i Mill(ensi)mo CCCCXXX cuius animae propitietur Deus Amen. (Here lies Eleanor / Alianore Pollard who was the wife of John Pollard and daughter of John Copleston who died on the 21st day of the month of September in the One thousandth four hundredth and thirtieth year of Our Lord of whose soul may God look upon with favour Amen.)

There are two further inscriptions on the same slab made later to commemorate two distant relations:

- Firstly, immediately beneath the above inscription, a small brass plaque with portrait of a kneeling lady, to commemorate Johanna Risdon (died 17 May 1610), daughter of George Pollard of Langley and mother of the Devon historian Tristram Risdon (died 1640) of Winscott in the parish of St Giles in the Wood, the author of "The Survey of Devon" (c. 1630).
- Secondly, below the last, incised in the stone slab on which the brasses are affixed memorial text to Margaret Risdon (died 1636), daughter of Tristram Risdon.

The 2nd son of John II Pollard and Eleanor Copleston was Robert Pollard, whose eldest son was Sir Lewis Pollard (c. 1465 – 1526), Justice of the Common Pleas from 1514 to 1526 and MP for Totnes in 1491, founder of the most influential branch of the Pollard family seated at Kings Nympton in Devon, from whom descended the Pollard Baronets.

- Walter IV Pollard (eldest son and heir) of Way, who married Joan Baron, daughter and sole heiress of Roger Baron of Baronshill, Devon.

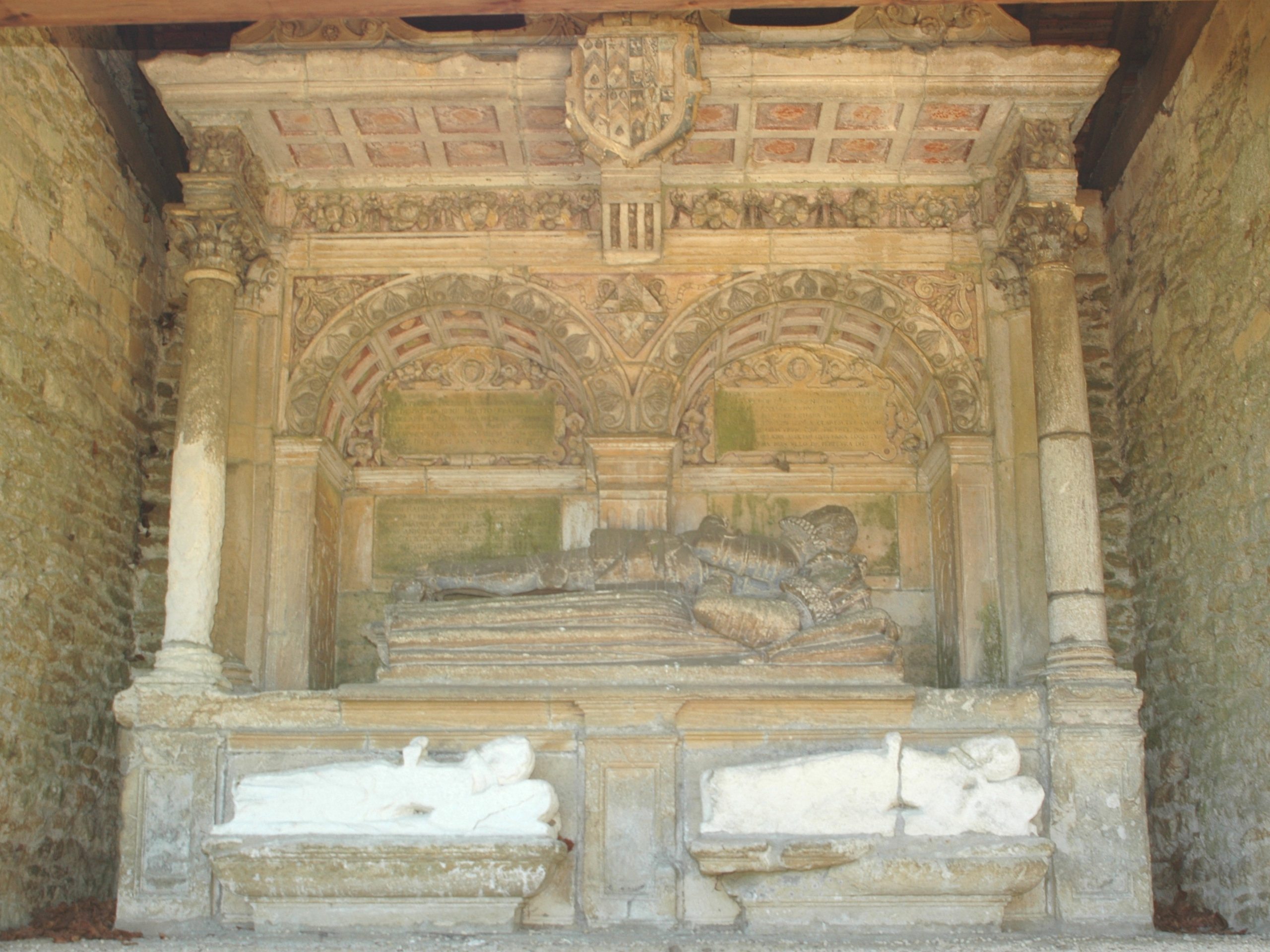
Monument in Nuneham Courtenay Church, Oxfordshire, of Anthony Pollard (died 1577), grandson of Richard I Pollard of Way and Margaret Cockworthy, and brother and heir of John Pollard (died 1557), Speaker of the House of Commons

- Richard I Pollard (son) of Way, who married Margaret Cockworthy, daughter of John Cockworthy of the family from Cockworthy in the parish of Yarnscombe, Devon. Their grandson by their daughter Avis Pollard was John Pollard (died 1557), Speaker of the House of Commons. The effigy and monument of their other grandson, and John Pollard's brother and heir, Anthony Pollard (died 1577), survives in Nuneham Courtenay Church, Oxfordshire.
- Anthony I Pollard (son) of Way, who married Petronell Chudleigh, daughter of James Chudleigh of Ashton in Devon.
- Sir Richard II Pollard (son) of Way, who married Joan Bampfield, daughter of Sir Edward Bampfield (died 1528) of Poltimore, Devon

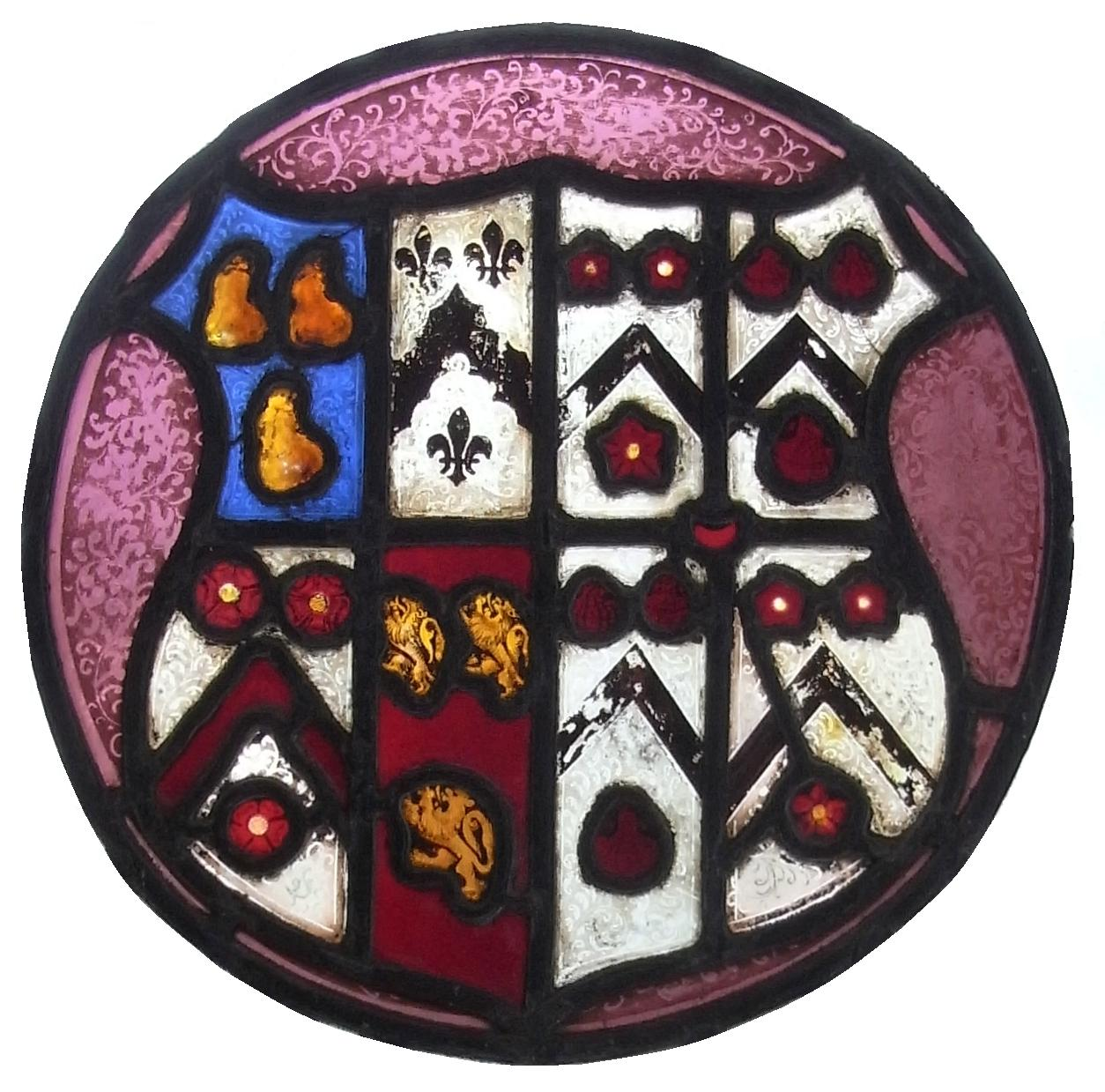
Heraldic stained-glass roundel in Kings Nympton Church showing arms of Stucley impaling Pollard (quartered by de Way/Davie), representing marriage of Sir Hugh Stucley (died 1559) of Affeton and Jane Pollard, a daughter of Sir Lewis Pollard (c. 1465 – 1526), Justice of the Common Pleas, of Kings Nympton

- Anthony II Pollard (died 1589) (son), of Waye, who married Johanna Stucley, a daughter of Lewis Stucley (1529–1581) of Affeton, Devon, Standard Bearer to Queen Elizabeth I, whose mother was Jane Pollard, a daughter of Sir Lewis Pollard (c. 1465 – 1526), Justice of the Common Pleas, of Kings Nympton. The arms of Stucley impaling Pollard survive in Kings Nympton Church, showing the following: baron, quarterly 1st azure, three pears pendant or (Stucley); 2nd Argent a chevron engrailed between three fleurs-de-lis sable (de Affeton); 3rd Argent a chevron gules between three roses of the second seeded or (Wood?); 4th Gules, three lions rampant or; femme quarterly 1st & 4th Argent, a chevron sable between three mullets gules pierced or (Pollard of Horwood); 2nd & 3rd Argent, a chevron sable between three escallops gules (Pollard of King's Nympton). The ledger stones inscribed to Anthony II Pollard and his wife Johanne Stucley survive in Horwood Church.

By this date the Pollard family had abandoned Way as a residence in favour of Horwood.

=== Wellington ===
Way became later the property of Lewis Wellington, living there when Risdon wrote his Survey of Devon (c. 1630). In a deed of 1611 Lewis Wellington of Great Torrington was described as a "woollen draper". In 1651 Thomas Wellington was mayor of Great Torrington.

=== Furse ===
The heiress Grace Wellington (1719-1763) brought the property to the family of her husband Philip Furse (1709-1774) of Dolton. Her son was Rev. Peter Wellington Furse (1755-1832), the owner of Way in 1810. The painter Charles Wellington Furse (1868-1904) was a member of this family. The Furse family owned the Halsdon Estate in Dolton from the later 17th century and lived there until the house was sold in 1982.
