= Winscott, St Giles in the Wood =

Farmhouse in Devon, England

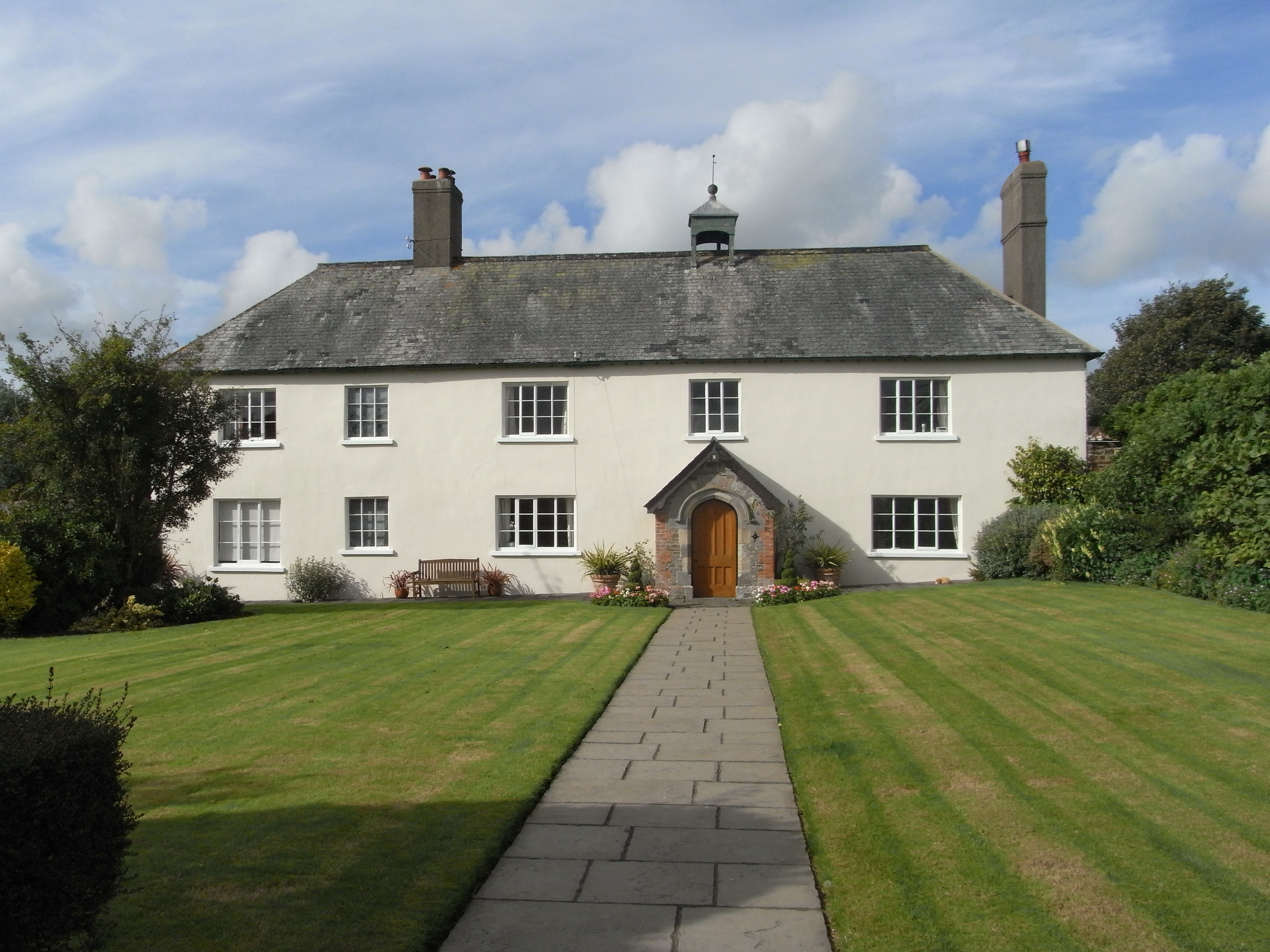
Winscott Barton in 2012

Today, Winscott Barton is a large 19th-century farmhouse in the parish of St Giles in the Wood, Devon, England. It was built on the site of the mansion house belonging to Tristram Risdon (died 1640), an early historian of Devon. The present building is Grade II listed.

The name Winscott derives from Anglo-Saxon meaning the cottage of a man named "Wine".

In the 16th century Winscott was the property of the Barry family, according to Risdon a branch of the ancient de Barry family which played a prominent role in the Norman conquest of Ireland under King Henry II (1154–1189). The family had large landholdings around Cork in Ireland. One of the Barons Barry gave all his English lands to his second son, and according to Risdon this branch of the family lived at Winscott. Michael Barry (died 1570) of Winscott married Johanna Pollard (1547–1610), the daughter of George Pollard of Langley, Yarnscombe. Their only child Thomazin Barry became the wife of John Tripconey of Gulval in Cornwall, but they had no children.

After the death of Michael Barry, Johanna Pollard remarried to William Risdon and remained at Winscott. William Risdon was the third son of Giles Risdon of Bableigh, in the nearby parish of Parkham. William and Johanna's eldest son Tristram Risdon was born at Winscott, and later it became his property when it was bequeathed to him by Thomazin. Tristram Risdon married Pascoe Chaffe. Their eldest son Giles (1609–1644) inherited, but died childless so the property passed to his brother William who left as his sole heiress a daughter Mary Risdon. Mary married four times, but her only child, from her first marriage to Joseph Prust, died aged only four. After Mary's death Winscott passed via descendants of one of Tristram Risdon's daughters eventually to the Northcote family, ancestors of Stafford Northcote, 1st Earl of Iddesleigh (1818–1887).

== Sources ==
- Risdon, Tristram (1811) [written c. 1605 – 1630]. Rees; et al. (eds.). The Chorographical Description or Survey of the County of Devon (updated ed.). Plymouth: Rees and Curtis.
