= John Pollard (speaker) =

English politician (died 1557)

Sir John Pollard (died August 1557) was a Speaker of the House of Commons. He became Speaker in 1553 and was made a Knight Bachelor only a few weeks before his death.

== Life ==
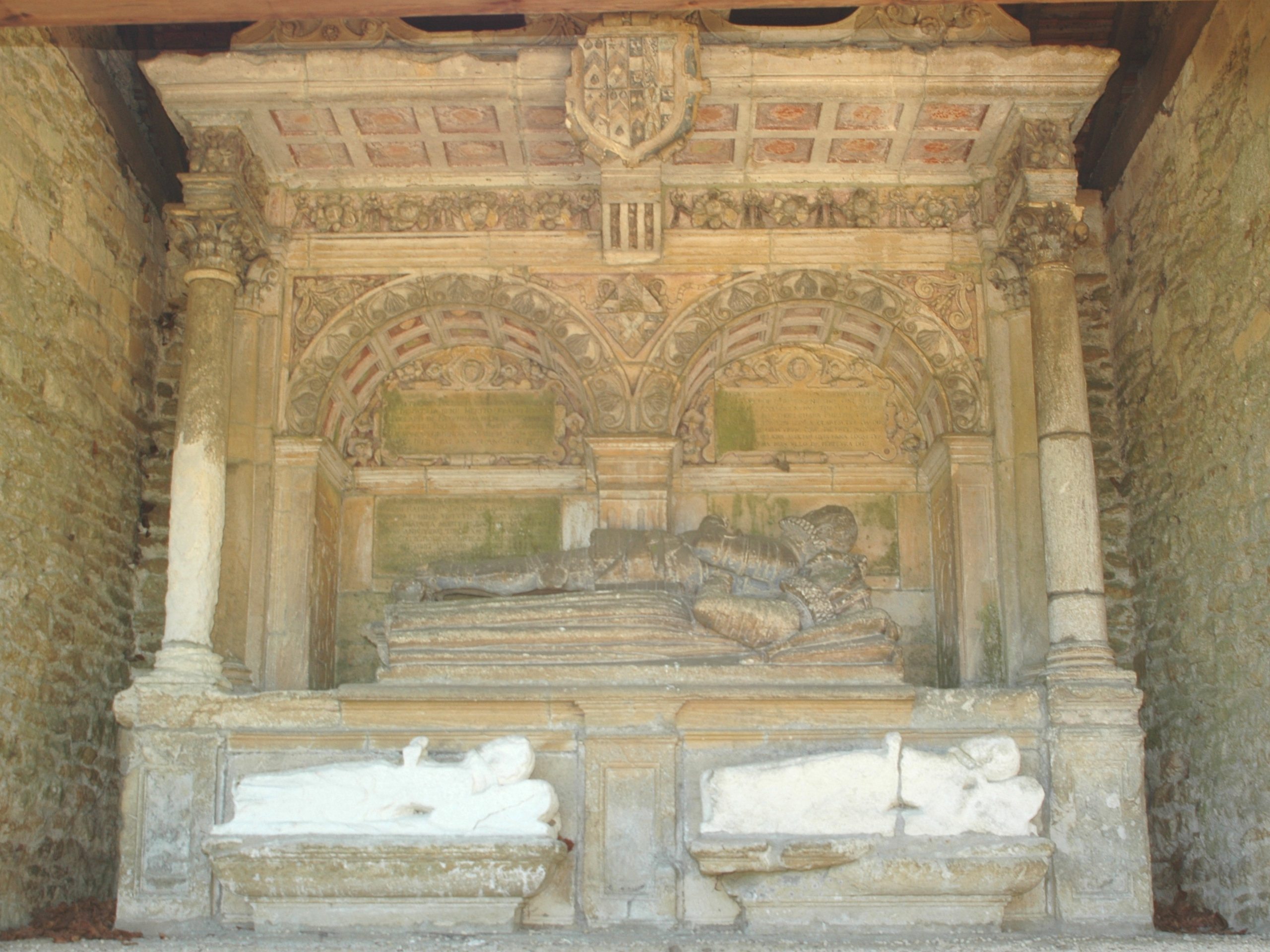
Monument in Nuneham Courtenay Church, Oxfordshire, of Anthony Pollard (d. 1577), brother and heir of John Pollard, and his wife Philippa (d. 1606)

He was second son of Walter Pollard of Plymouth, by Avice, daughter of Richard Pollard of Way, in the parish of St Giles in the Wood, near Great Torrington, Devon. John Pollard may have been the Pollard who, without Christian name, is mentioned as entering the Middle Temple on 3 June 1515; but it may also be that this entry is that of his relative Lewis Pollard, son of Sir Hugh Pollard and grandson of Sir Lewis Pollard (c. 1465 – 1526), Justice of the Common Pleas. John was appointed Autumn Reader of the Middle Temple in 1535, and became serjeant-at-law in 1547.

In 1529 and 1536 he was elected Member of Parliament for Plymouth.

After 1545 he received, perhaps through the influence of a relative, Richard Pollard, who had taken part in the suppression of the monasteries, a grant of the manor of Nuneham Courtney, where he subsequently lived. He was relieved by patent of 21 October 1550 from his office of serjeant-at-law, in order to become vice-president of the council for the Welsh marches. He was elected member for Oxfordshire in the parliaments of 1553 and 1554, and for Chippenham, Wiltshire in that of 1555.

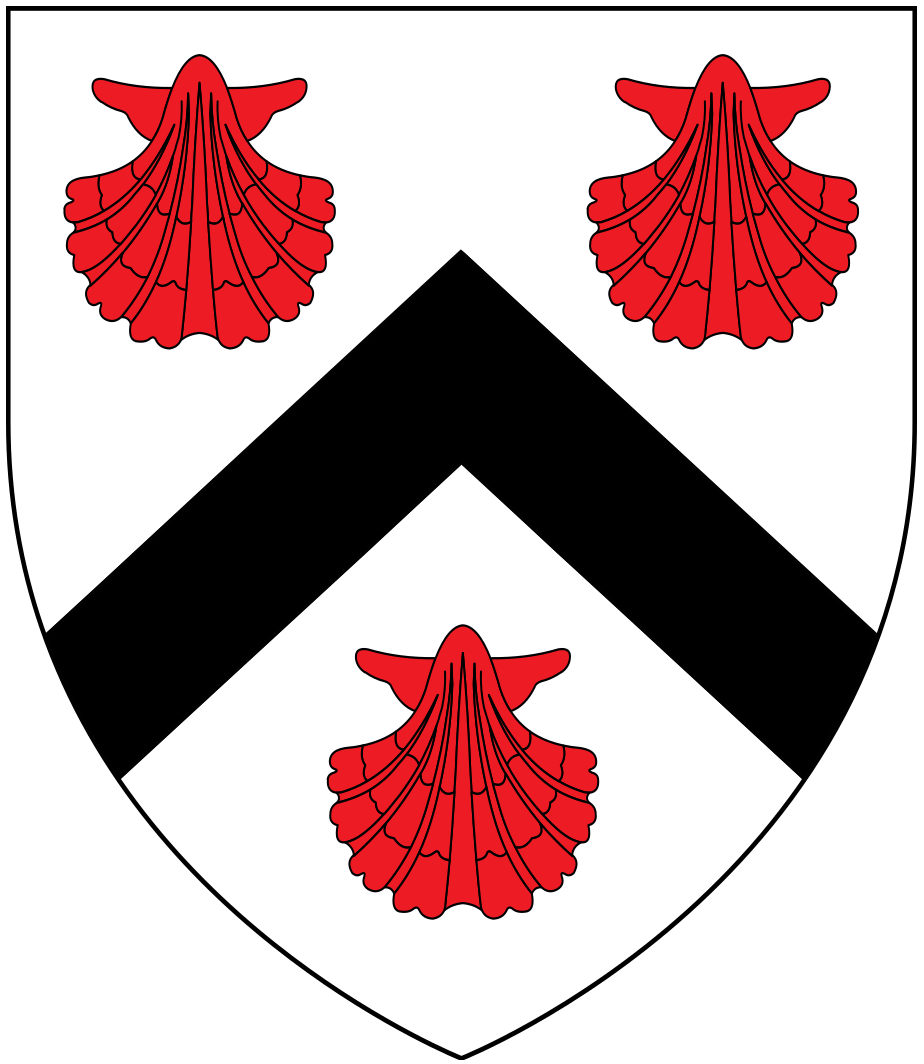
Arms of Sir John Pollard, Speaker of the House of Commons: Argent, a chevron sable between three escallops gules.

He was chosen Speaker of the House of Commons in 1553, and again in 1555, holding the office till the close of the parliament of 1555. He was knighted in October 1555.

He had married Mary, daughter of Richard Gray of London, but left no issue. His estates passed mostly to his brother Anthony, after the death of his widow.

== Death ==
John Pollard died in August 1557, and was buried on 25 August.

Political offices
Preceded by Sir James Dyer	Speaker of the House of Commons; 1553	Succeeded by Sir Robert Broke
Political offices
Preceded by Sir Clement Higham	Speaker of the House of Commons; 1555	Succeeded by Sir William Cordell
