= Newton Tracey =

Village and former civil parish in Devon, UK

Coordinates: 51.022°N 4.102°W

- Church of St Thomas a Becket, Newton Tracey

- Location within Devon
- Civil parish: Horwood, Lovacott and Newton Tracey
- District: North Devon
- Shire county: Devon
- Region: South West
- Country: England
- Sovereign state: United Kingdom

Newton Tracey is a village and former civil parish, now in the parish of Horwood, Lovacott and Newton Tracey, in the North Devon district of Devon, England, on the B3232 road about 4 miles (6 km) south of Barnstaple.

The Grade II* listed church of St Thomas à Becket dates from the 13th century. Its nave was remodelled in the 15th century when the tower was added, and the whole was restored in 1867–8.

== Civil parish ==
On 1 April 1986 the parish of Horwood was merged with Newton Tracey. On 9 January 1991, the new parish was renamed to "Horwood, Lovacott and Newton Tracey". In 1961 the civil parish of Newton Tracey (prior to the merge) had a population of 92.
