= Tristram Risdon =

English antiquarian and topographer

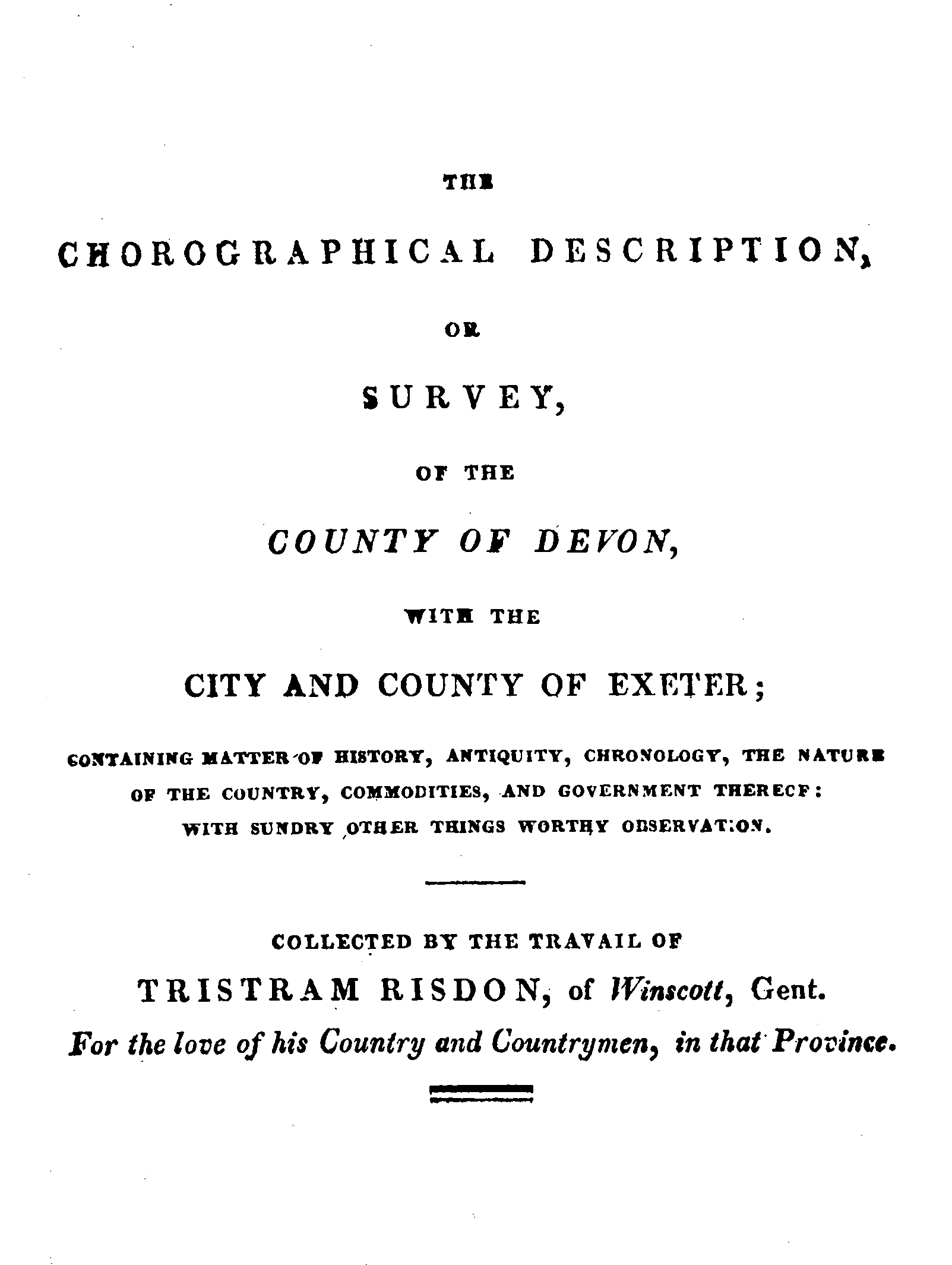
The title page of the 1811 edition of Risdon's Survey of the County of Devon

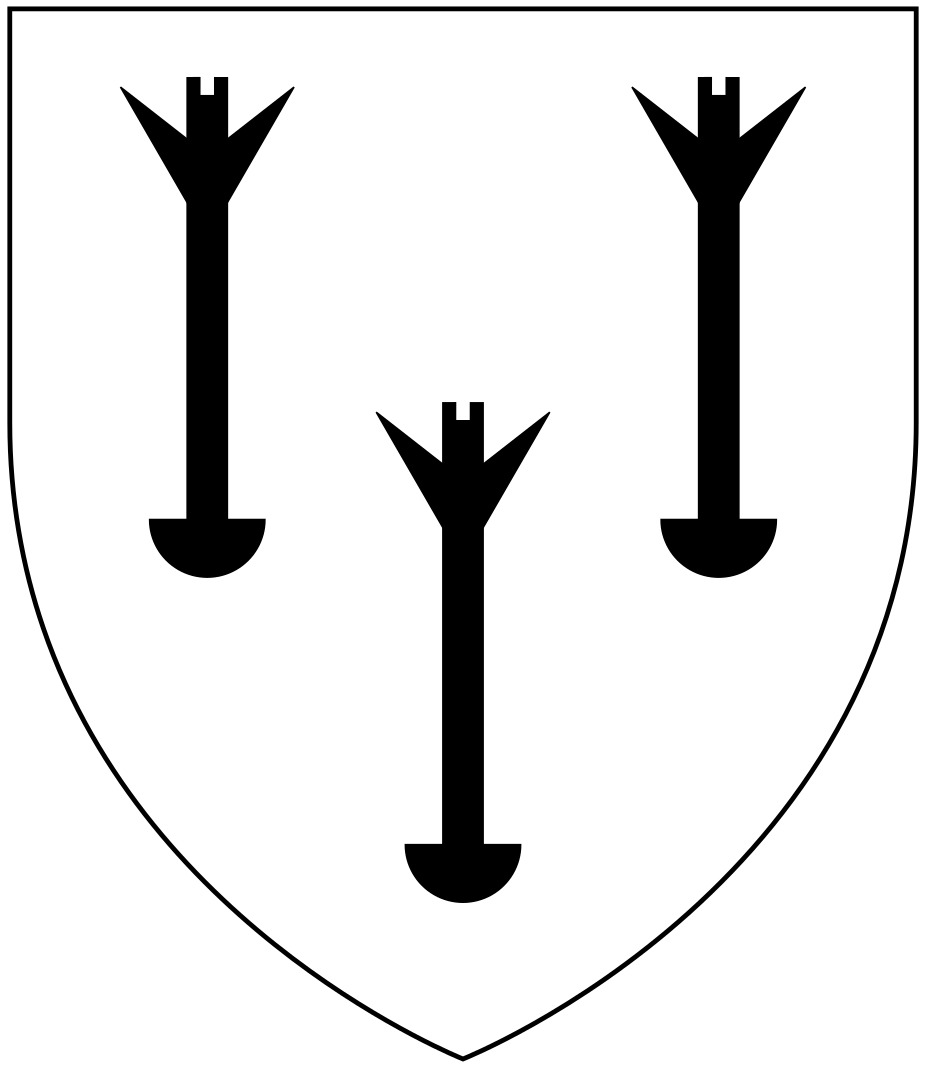
Arms of Risdon of Bableigh and Winscott: Argent, three bird-bolts sable (Note: Per the 17th-century Risdon monument and Chafe monument in St Giles in the Wood Church, and as given by Thomas Robson in The British Herald. However, the published edition of Risdon's own Note-book gives his arms with the tinctures reversed: Sable, three bird bolts palewise argent, as does his contemporary Devon historian Sir William Pole.)

Tristram Risdon (c. 1580 – 1640) was an English antiquarian and topographer, and the author of Survey of the County of Devon. He was able to devote most of his life to writing this work. After he completed it in about 1632 it circulated around interested people in several manuscript copies for almost 80 years before it was first published by Edmund Curll in a very inferior form. A full version was not published until 1811. Risdon also collected information about genealogy and heraldry in a note-book; this was edited and published in 1897.

== Biography ==
Risdon was born at Winscott, in the parish of St Giles in the Wood, near Great Torrington in Devon, England. He was the eldest son of William Risdon (d.1622) and his wife Joan (née Pollard). (Note: Joan Pollard was the daughter of George Pollard of Langley in the nearby parish of Yarnscombe, by his wife Thomazine Coplestone, a daughter of John III Copleston (1475-1550) "The Great Copleston" of Copleston, Devon. Her younger brother Pollard, of unknown first name, was Gentleman Usher to Queen Elizabeth I (1558–1603) and to her successor King James I (1603–1625) and married a sister of Elizabeth Talbot, Countess of Shrewsbury (c. 1527–1608) ("Bess of Hardwick"). Pollard's daughters by this marriage were Maids of Honour to Queen Elizabeth I.) William was the younger son of Giles Risdon (1494–1583) of Bableigh, in the parish of Parkham, where Tristram Risdon stated that the family had been seated since before 1274. Risdon also stated that the family originated in Gloucestershire, where during the reign of King Richard I (1189–1199) they were lords of the manor of Risdon.

After a local education, Tristram Risdon studied either at Broadgates Hall or at Exeter College in Oxford, though he left the university without taking any degree. This was supposedly because of the death of his half-sister, Thomazin Barry, upon which he inherited the family estate at Winscott, which required his personal attention.

He married Pascoe Chafe, the daughter of Thomas Chafe of Exeter, on 2 December 1608 and they had four sons and three daughters. From about 1605 to the 1630s he devoted his time to the study of antiquities, especially those of Devon, and the result of his labours was his Survey of the County of Devon. He died at Winscott in 1640 and was interred in St Giles's Church; his mother (died 1610) is commemorated by a monumental brass in the same church.

== The Survey ==
According to John Prince, who had used the Survey as a source for his Worthies of Devon, Risdon started work on the Survey in 1605 and completed it in 1630. Internal evidence shows, however, that it was not completed until 1632 at the earliest.

Risdon was one of a number of authors who wrote about the topography of Devon between the 17th and early 19th centuries. These authors regularly copied content from earlier works, and Risdon admitted that he had taken much of his Survey from his friend Sir William Pole's manuscript Collections towards a description of the country of Devon. Risdon did, though, make considerable additions and improvements of his own and he acknowledged his debt to Pole "from whose Lamp I have received Light in these my Labours".

However, in organising his survey Risdon chose not to follow Pole's method, which was by the units of county government, and he also rejected the system adopted by Thomas Westcote, another friend, in his A View of Devonshire of 1630, which was based on the courses of the rivers. Instead he decided to begin "...In the east part of the county, and with the sun, to make my gradation into the south, holding course about by the river Tamer [sic], to visit such places as are offered to be seen upon her banks. Lastly, to take notice of such remarkable things as the north parts afford".

Unlike his antiquarian contemporaries, Risdon's work does not overly concern itself with genealogy and reads more like a travel book, apparently describing parishes in the same order as he visited them. Concerning his literary style, the opinion of Joyce Youings, former Professor of English Social History at Exeter University, was that although his general description has echoes of John Hooker's writing, "The three hundred pages of topographical detail which follow make extremely tedious reading, unredeemed by [Thomas] Westcote's style."

"... the whole town, within little more than an hour, was consumed; the people in the mean time so amazed that they knew not what to do. Many were burned; namely, one Hartnoll, a blind man, lying in his bed, was carried to the market place for his safety, and yet there burnt..."

— Risdon: Survey of Devon, on the Tiverton fire of 1598.

According to Gordon Goodwin, writing in the 1900 Dictionary of National Biography, Risdon was the first documentary source of several old Devonshire stories: of Elflida and Ethelwold, Childe the Hunter, Budockside and his daughter, (Note: Risdon wrote "The church of this parish [St Budeaux] once stood in a remote and unhealthy place by the sea side, but Robert Budshead [sic] rebuilt it in a place more convenient, at his own cost; whereof (see the fate!) his own daughter first possessed the place for her burial".) and the Tiverton fire.

In its turn, Risdon's Survey has been used as a source for later topographies. For example, apart from John Prince's Worthies of Devon mentioned above, the Lysons brothers credit it and Pole's collections for the details of the descent of the principal landed property in the Devon volume of their Magna Britannia (1822).

=== Publication ===
After the completion of the Survey, many copies of the manuscript entered into public circulation, none of them exactly agreeing with the others, each having something redundant or deficient. Ten copies of the manuscript are known to survive.

The Survey was first published in 1714 by Edmund Curll, the infamous London bookseller, who extracted the parts he thought would best suit his purpose, and printed them. But shortly before publication, the proposed book appears to have been shown to John Prince, who, being well acquainted with the original, persuaded Curll to publish the remainder as a continuation of the parts already printed. Curll did this in the same year, but it remained a very imperfect version.

In 1785 William Chapple published the first part of his Review of Risdon's Survey of Devon. It contained the general description of the county, but Chapple died before he could complete the work. The first complete edition of the Survey appeared in 1811 and included many additions by uncredited editors. (Note: According to Gordon Goodwin's 1900 DNB entry these editors were John Taylor, who wrote 68 pages of updates; John Swete; William Woollcombe, M.D., of Plymouth; and one of the publishers, Rees of Plymouth.) Its full title is:

The chorographical description, or survey of the county of Devon, with the city and county of Exeter; containing matter of history, antiquity, chronology, the nature of the country, commodities and government thereof; with sundry other things worthy observation. Collected by the travail of Tristram Risdon, of Winscott, Gent. For the love of his Country and Countrymen, in that Province.

This publication was based on the copy of Risdon's manuscript which belonged to John Coles of Stonehouse which after having been compared with others appeared to the editors be the most correct. No work has been done to compare the various manuscript and print versions, and Youings has said that until this is done it will remain unknown exactly what Risdon himself wrote.

== The Note-Book ==
Risdon also left a note-book in which he had collected genealogical and heraldic information, mostly about the prominent families of South West England and particularly of Devon. Consisting of 188 foolscap leaves, many left blank, it was transcribed and edited by James Dallas and Henry Porter and published in London in 1897. In the introduction to the book the editors date the majority of its compilation to between 1608 and 1628, making it contemporaneous with his writing of The Survey. The original note-book is in Exeter Cathedral Library.

== Sources ==
- Maxted, Ian; Brayshay, Mark (1996). "Aid to research: A list of historical works on the topography of south-west counties". In Brayshay, Mark (ed.). Topographical Writers in South-West England. University of Exeter Press. pp. 136–176. ISBN 0-85989-424-X.
- Moore, Thomas (1829). "Tristram Risdon, the Antiquary and Topographer". The History and Topography of Devonshire. Vol. 2. London: Robert Jennings. pp. 370–373.
- Prince, John (1810). Danmonii Orientales Illustres: or, The Worthies of Devon. Rees & Curtis.
- Risdon, Tristram (1811). Rees; et al. (eds.). The Chorographical Description or Survey of the County of Devon (updated ed.). Plymouth: Rees and Curtis.
- Risdon, Tristram (1897). Dallas, James; Porter, Henry G. (eds.). The Note-Book of Tristram Risdon, 1608–1628. London: Eliot Stock.
- Youings, Joyce (1996). "Some Early Topographers of Devon and Cornwall". In Brayshay, Mark (ed.). Topographical Writers in South-West England. University of Exeter Press. pp. 50–61. ISBN 0-85989-424-X.
