= Bableigh, Parkham =

Historic estate in Devon, England

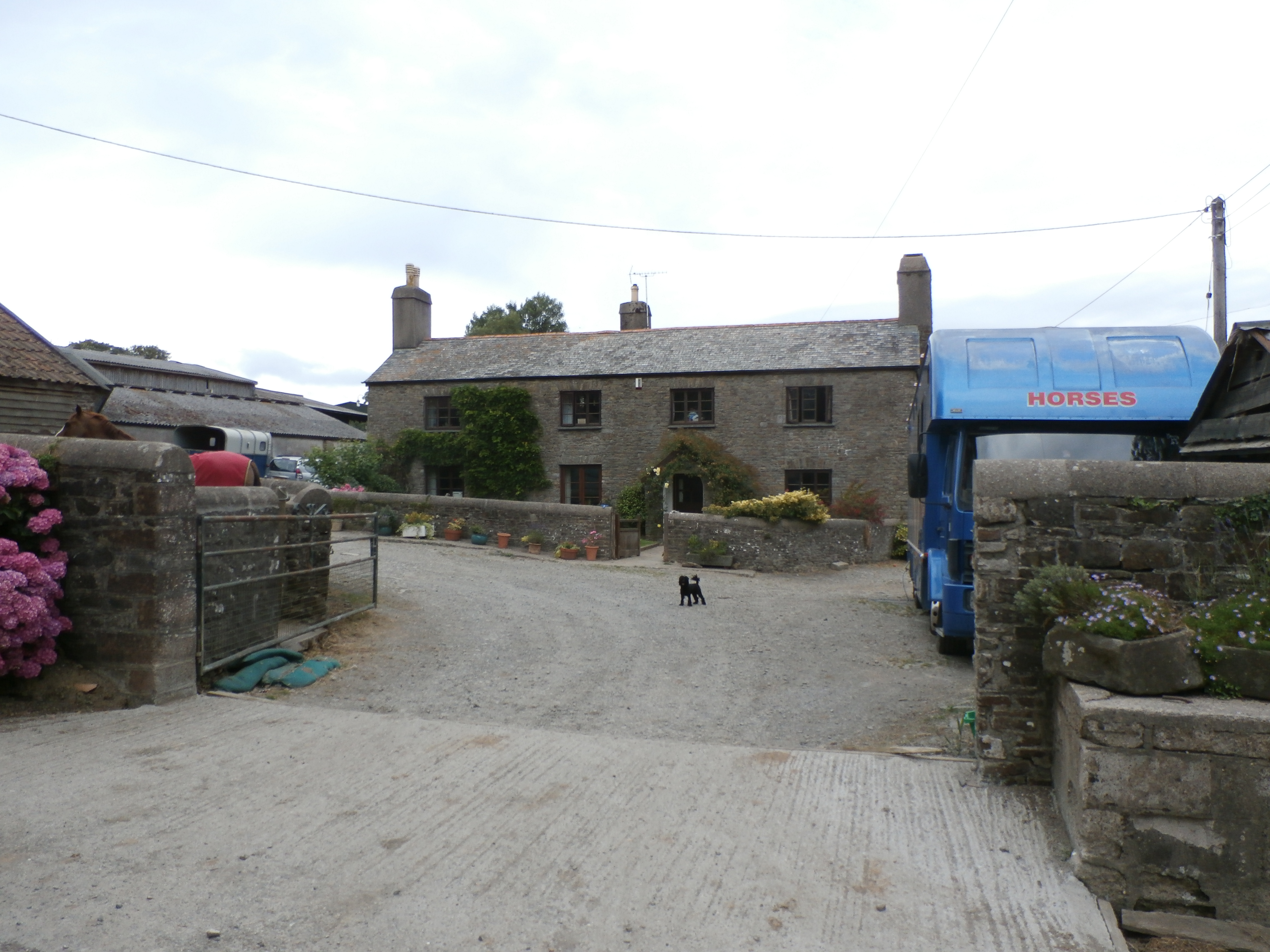
The present Bableigh Farm, in the parish of Parkham, Devon, near the site of the demolished former mansion house occupied by the Risdon family from the 12th - 18th centuries

Bableigh (pronounced Babe-leigh or bay-balee) is an historic estate in the parish of Parkham in North Devon, England. It is separated from the village of Parkham by the Bableigh Brook. It was the earliest recorded seat of the Risdon family in Devonshire, from which was descended the Devon historian Tristram Risdon (died 1640).

== Descent ==
=== de Oilgi ===
The holder of Bableigh during the reign of King William the Conqueror (1066–1087) was Robert de Oilgi.

=== Risdon ===
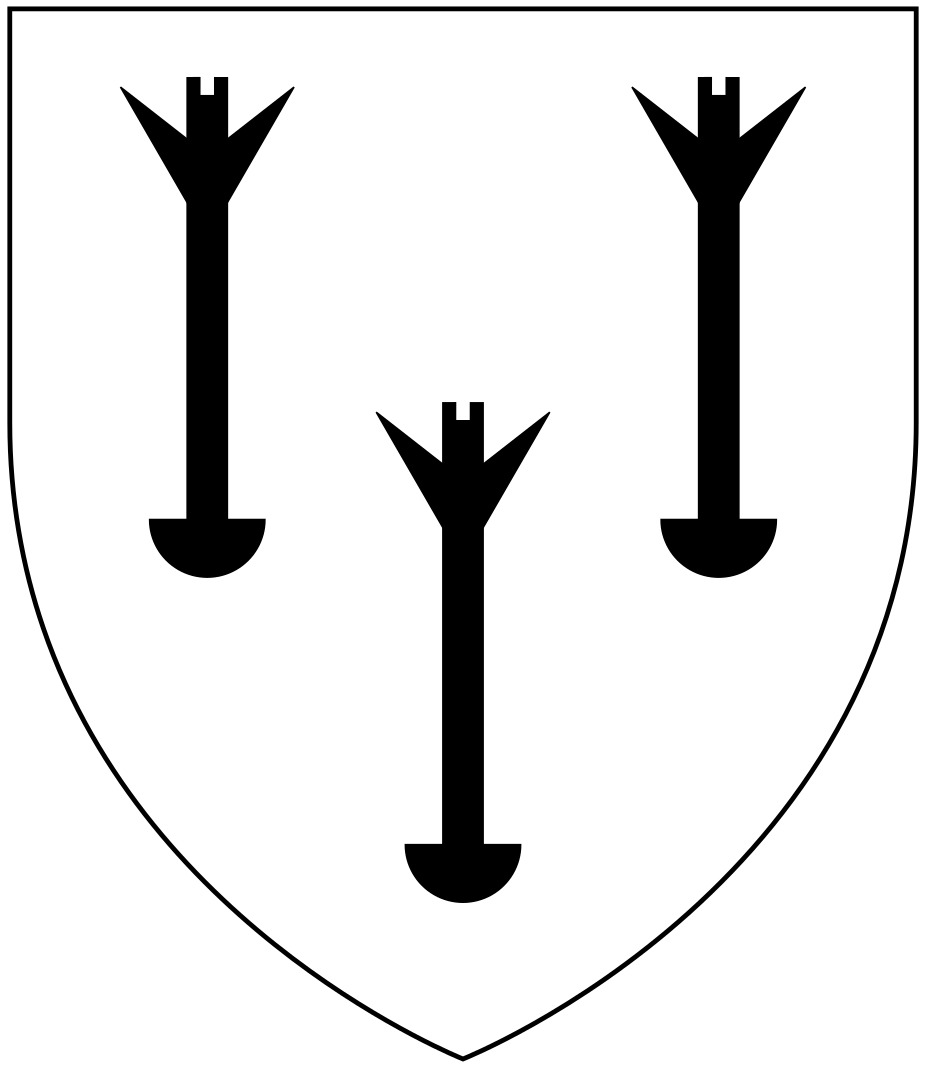
Arms of Risdon of Bableigh and Winscott: Argent, three bird-bolts sable

According to Tristram Risdon (died 1640) himself, in his work The Survey of Devon, the Risdon family originated in Gloucestershire, where during the reign of King Richard I (1189–1199) they were lords of the manor of Risdon. The Risdon family is first recorded at Bableigh in 1274, and a member of this family, apparently Giles Risdon (1494–1583), built the north aisle of Parkham Church (in which are situated several monuments to the Risdon family, now very worn and illegible) and also Veybridge (alias Heybridge) over the River Torridge. The descent of Bableigh in the Risdon family was as follows:

==== 13th century ====
- Robert Risdon, held Bableigh in 1274

==== 15th century and subsequent ====
- Thomas Risdon (15th century), the first member of the family recorded in the Heraldic Visitations of Devon.
- Gefferie Risdon (son and heir)
- Richard Risdon (son) who married Matilda Braye, daughter of John Braye.
- John Risdon (died 1518) (son)
- Giles Risdon (1494–1583) (son and heir), whose monument survives in Parkham Church, with inscription worn away. He built the north aisle of Parkham Church, in which is situated his monument, and also Veybridge (alias Heybridge) over the River Torridge. He married twice:
  - Firstly to Elizabeth Bremelcombe (died 1549), daughter and heiress of Thomas Bremelcombe of Honichurch, Devon. By his first wife he had children two daughters and seven sons including:
    - Thomas Risdon (died 1586), his eldest son and heir to Bableigh,
    - Ambrose Risdon (died 1604) (2nd son), who founded his own branch of the Risdon family in the parish of Buckland Brewer, adjacent to Parkham.
    - William Risdon (died 1622), of Winscott, St Giles in the Wood, father of the Devon historian Tristram Risdon (died 1640). William married Joanna Pollard a daughter of George Pollard of Langley, Yarnscombe by his wife Thomazine Coplestone, a daughter of John Copleston (1475–1550) "The Great Copleston" of Copleston, Devon. Joanna's younger brother Pollard, or another close relation, of unknown first name, was Gentleman Usher to Queen Elizabeth I (1558–1603) and to her successor King James I (1603–1625) and married a sister of Elizabeth Talbot, Countess of Shrewsbury (c. 1527 – 1608) ("Bess of Hardwick"). Pollard's daughters by this marriage were Maids of Honour to Queen Elizabeth I.
    - Edward Risdon (born 1541) who was a Jesuit priest, a Fellow of Exeter College, Oxford and one of the founders of the College of Douai in France, established in about 1561 for Catholic exiles from Protestant England.
    - John Risdon (1544–1628), rector of Parkham.
  - Secondly in 1649/50 he married Phillipa, of unrecorded family, widow of Mountjoy, by whom he had further children.
- Thomas Risdon (died 1586) (eldest son and heir), a Justice of the Peace for Devon, a lawyer who was double Reader of the Inner Temple. He died along with several other Justices of the Peace and members of the Devon Gentry at the Black Assize of Exeter 1586, having contracted jail fever. He married Willmot Giffard (died 1617), a daughter of his neighbour Thomas Giffard (died 1550) of Halsbury, in the parish of Parkham, by his wife Margaret Monck, a daughter of Anthony Monck (died 1545) of Potheridge in Devon, great-great-grandfather of George Monck, 1st Duke of Albemarle (1608–1670). He had five daughters and two sons, the younger of whom was Thomas Risdon (died 1641), of Sandwell, in the parish of Harberton, near Totnes, Devon, Reader of the Inner Temple, one of the Worthies of Devon of John Prince (1643–1723). His monument survives at Harberton Church, Devon. He made his fortune in the law and purchased the estate of Sandwell. As he died without children he made his great-nephew Thomas Risdon (died 1667) his heir, the son of Francis Risdon (1601–1639) of Bableigh by his 3rd wife Dorothy Bluett. A monument survives in Harberton Church in memory of Dorothy Bluett erected by her son Thomas Risdon (died 1667) of Sandwell.
- Giles Risdon (1565–1632) (eldest son and heir), who married Elizabeth Viell, a daughter and co-heiress of William Viell (died 1598) of Trevorder in Cornwall, and of Vielston in the parish of Buckland Brewer, adjacent to Parkham, in Devon. He had three daughters and three sons.
- Francis Risdon (1601–1639) (eldest son and heir), who married three times:
  - Firstly to Frances Hill, without children;
  - Secondly in 1630 to Frances Greene (died 1631) of Harberton, Devon, by whom he had a son and heir Giles Risdon (1632–1679).
  - Thirdly to Dorothy Bluett (1612–1654), youngest daughter of Arthur Bluett (1573–1612) of Holcombe Rogus, Devon, and widow of Giles Poyntz, a relative of her step-father Philip Poyntz (died 1645). Her monument survives at Harberton Church, Devon. By Dorothy Bluett Risdon had two children including a son Thomas Risdon (died 1667) of Harberton, whose monument survives at Harberton Church, Devon.
- Giles Risdon (1632–1679) (son and heir by father's 2nd wife), who married Grace Hill (died 1677), whose monument survives at Harberton Church, by whom he had five daughters and seven sons.
- Giles Risdon (died 1697) (eldest son and heir). He married three times:
  - Firstly in 1677 to Katherine Coffin (1654–1682), third daughter of Richard Coffin (died 1700) of nearby Portledge, in the parish of Alwington, Sheriff of Devon in 1683, of a very ancient Devon family. Without children.
  - Secondly in 1684 to Jane Carter (died 1685), a daughter and co-heiress of John Carter of St Columb Major in Cornwall, by whom he had a daughter Jane Risdon (born 1685).
  - Thirdly to Anne Darrell, daughter of Thomas Darrell of Trewornan, Egloshayle, Cornwall, who survived him and remarried to John Carveth. By Anne Darrell he had three daughters and a son and heir Giles Risdon (1689–1748).
- Giles Risdon (1689–1748) (son and heir by father's third marriage), who in 1729 married Anne Bruton (died 1752), and had a daughter Elizabeth Risdon and a son and heir Giles Risdon (born 1732).
- Giles Risdon (born 1732) (son and heir), who married a certain Frances, who survived him.
