= Horwood, Lovacott and Newton Tracey =

Civil parish in Devon, England

Coordinates: 51.0271°N 4.1111°W

- St Michael's Church

- Location within Devon
- Population: 531 (2021 census)
- OS grid reference: SS510271
- Civil parish: Horwood, Lovacott and Newton Tracey
- District: North Devon
- Shire county: Devon
- Region: South West
- Country: England
- Sovereign state: United Kingdom
- Post town: BARNSTAPLE
- Dialling code: 01271
- Police: Devon and Cornwall
- Fire: Devon and Somerset
- Ambulance: South Western
- UK Parliament: North Devon

Horwood, Lovacott and Newton Tracey is a civil parish in the North Devon district, in Devon, England. In the 2021 census it was recorded as having a population of 531. It includes the villages of Horwood and Newton Tracey and the hamlet of Lovacott.

The parish was formed as Newton Tracey in 1986 from the former civil parishes of Horwood and Newton Tracey and the Lovacott ward of Fremington parish, and adopted its current name in 1991. The neighbouring parishes are Fremington to the north; Tawstock to the east; Yarnscombe (in Torridge district) to the south east; Alverdiscott (Torridge district) to the south; Westleigh and Instow to the west.

== History and geography ==
The hamlet of Lovacott was recorded in the Domesday Book of 1086 as Lovacota, within the hundred of Merton. Prior to the Norman Conquest, it was held by the Saxon Lufa (or Lofe); by 1086, the manor was held by Roald Dubbed (or Adobed). The settlement is divided into two distinct areas: Higher Lovacott, which represents the original manorial core and upland farmstead cluster, and Lower Lovacott, which developed later around the school and the Methodist chapel.

Connecting the sections of the hamlet is Darky Lane, an ancient holloway or sunken lane. The name is a traditional West Country toponym describing the permanent shade created by its deep-set banks and overhanging hedgerow canopy. Historically used as a drovers' road, the lane is an archaeological feature reflecting the medieval agricultural layout of the parish, linking the upland farmsteads to lower pastures.

To the north of Lower Lovacott lies Bailey Wood, a 2.69-hectare Woodland Trust site planted on former pasture land in 1974. Predominantly oak woodland, it provides a shelter belt from prevailing winds for the adjacent playing fields and serves as a community amenity.

== Archaeology and industry ==
The agricultural landscape contains evidence of the 18th-century lime burning industry. The 1838 Tithe Map identifies "Quarry Fields" near Lovacott Cross, where small-scale limestone extraction occurred to provide soil conditioners for the parish's acidic upland pastures. Census records from 1851 further indicate a reliance on auxiliary trades, including blacksmithing and lime processing, alongside traditional animal husbandry.

In Horwood, the building historically known as Mutton Hall (now Horwood Cottage) is noted by Historic England for its potential 13th-century origins. It retains rare medieval features, including unglazed wooden mullion windows and a Tudor arched doorway.

== Architecture ==
There are 40 listed buildings in the parish. The Church of St Michael in Horwood is Grade I listed; the Church of St Thomas of Canterbury in Newton Tracey and Hoopers Cottage in Horwood (a house dated c.1600) are Grade II*, and the remaining houses, gravestones, and farm buildings are Grade II.

Notable Grade II structures include East Barton, a manor house of late medieval and 17th-century origins, and Horwood House, which contains early 18th-century remodelling. In Newton Tracey, Newton Barton and South Barton (formerly Newton Barton) is a former manor house dating to the 16th century, constructed of painted rendered stone and cob.

== Religion and education ==
The two Anglican parish churches are in the Diocese of Exeter.

Horwood and Newton Tracey Community Primary School is located at Lovacott. It was opened in 1876 as the Lovacott Board School, although records indicate a school has served the area for over two centuries. The current school has approximately 90 pupils.

== Culture and folklore ==
Historically, the parish was situated within a region where traditional West Country folk beliefs persisted late into the 19th century. This included the consultation of "white witches" (local healers) to cure livestock ailments, a practice documented by J.R. Chanter in 1867 as remaining active in the rural hinterlands of North Devon.

== Economy and amenities ==
The parish's primary commercial and social hub is the Hunters Inn at Newton Tracey. Established for over 150 years, the inn historically served as a coaching stop for traffic and livestock movement between Barnstaple and Great Torrington. Licensing records from the mid-19th century identify John Shapland as the victualler, succeeded in later decades by William Moore. Today, it remains the only public house in the parish and serves as a frequent meeting place for the civil parish council and community groups.

Adjacent to the school is Lovacott Village Hall, which serves as a central community facility for the inhabitants of Horwood, Lovacott, and Newton Tracey. Established under a deed of trust in 1952, the hall provides a venue for social events and parish meetings. It is also used daily by the local primary school for physical education and housing its nursery classroom. The nearby Lovacott School Chapel, a Grade II listed former Baptist chapel dating to 1827, further contributes to the hamlet's concentration of community architecture.

Public access defibrillators are maintained by the Parish Council at the Hunters Inn (Newton Tracey), Lovacott Primary School, and the Horwood lychgate.
