= Parish church of St Giles, St Giles in the Wood =

Church in Devon, England

Coordinates: 50°57′05″N 4°05′23″W

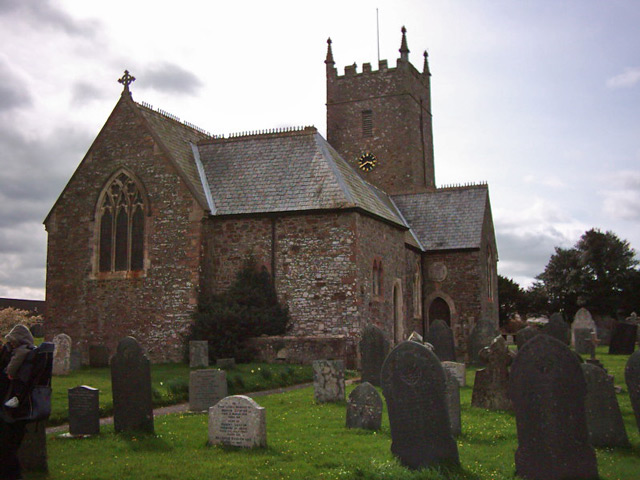
Parish church of St Giles, St Giles in the Wood

The parish church of St Giles, in the village of St Giles in the Wood, Devon, England, was founded in 1309. It was completely rebuilt in the 16th century, and again in 1862–3 by local landowner Mark Rolle, who retained the outer walls, west tower, and various monuments to his family. In 1967, a chapel named after Mary Withecombe was created out of part of the south aisle, in which smaller congregations now meet.

== History ==
The church was built in 1309 when licence was obtained from the Bishop of Exeter to build a chapel of ease because the church at Great Torrington was considered too far for the convenience of the local inhabitants. The licence was obtained by Sir Richard Merton, who held the advowson of Great Torrington. The church was dedicated to St Giles the Hermit, and its benefactors included Sir William Herward of Dodscott, and a member of the Pollard family of Way, Barry of Winscott, de Stevenstone of Stevenstone, and Dynant of Whitesley.

It was completely rebuilt in the 16th century, in the Perpendicular-Gothic style. Of this building, only the outer walls and the west tower, which contains six bells, remain from its restoration of 1862–3 by John Hayward, funded by Mark Rolle. Rolle also donated the marble and alabaster pulpit. A memorial cross erected by the parishioners in his memory stands in the churchyard to the east of the church directly in front of the lychgate. In 1879 an organ chamber and vestry were added. The local historian W. G. Hoskings did not care for Rolle's restoration of the church and wrote in 1954 that he "spared no expense to make it as ugly as his own house", referring to Stevenstone of which Hoskings had already written: "The richest man in Devon built himself the ugliest house."

In 1967, a chapel named after Mary Withecombe was created out of part of the south aisle, in which smaller congregations now meet.
