= Langley, Yarnscombe =

Historic estate in Devon, England

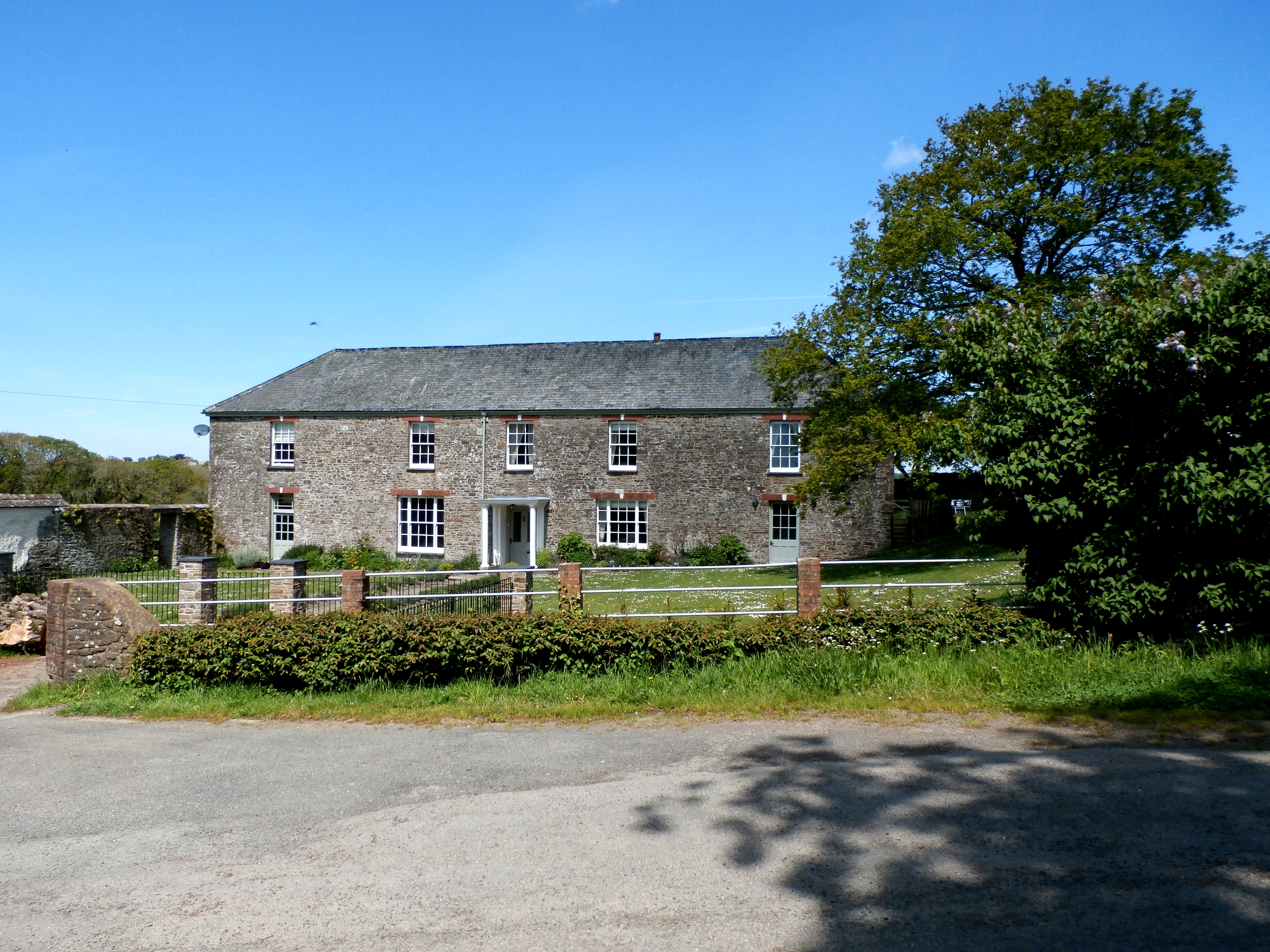
Langley Barton

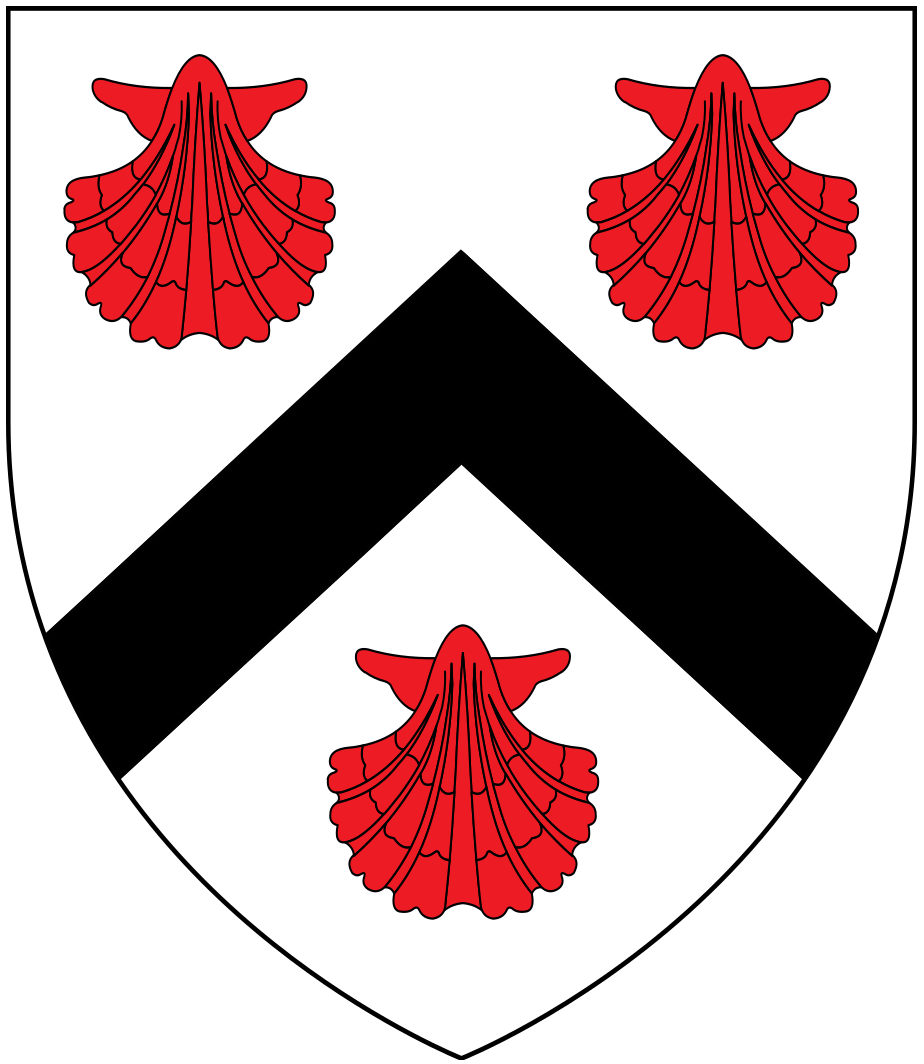
Arms of Pollard of Langley (being the ancient arms of Pollard of Way in the parish of St Giles in the Wood): Argent, a chevron sable between three escallops gules

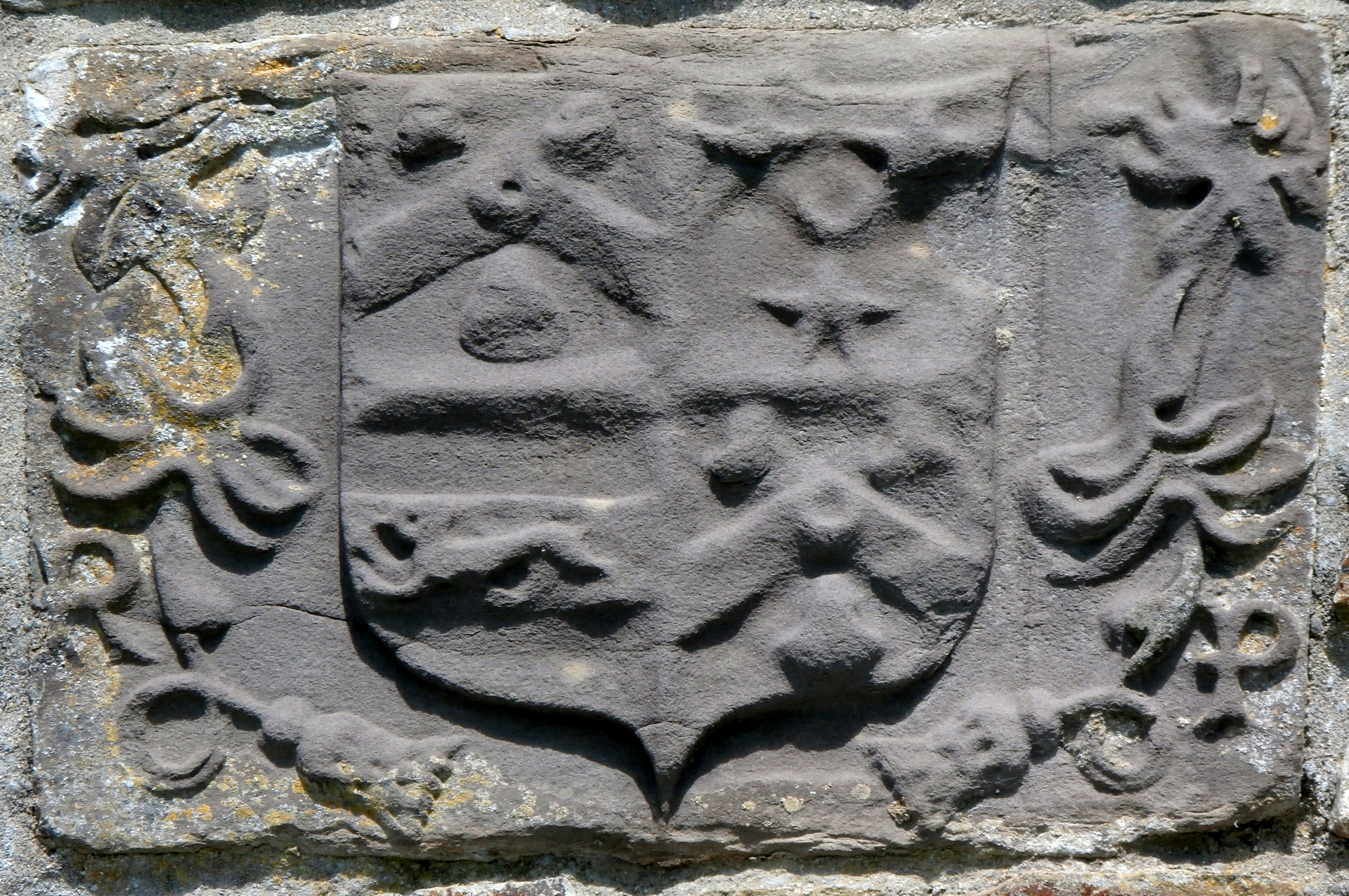
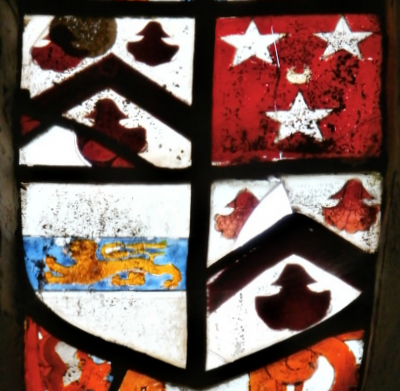
Left: 17th century sculpted stone panel with escutcheon showing quartered arms of Pollard of Langley. Above front door of Langley Barton. With initials "R" and "P", possibly for Richard II Pollard of Langley (d. 1660), or possibly of his father Richard I Pollard (d. 1626). Right: The same quarterings on a fragment of ancient stained glass in Alwington Church, Devon:
- 1&4: Argent, a chevron sable between three escallops gules (a crescent for difference) (Pollard of Way in the parish of St Giles in the Wood, Devon)
- 2: Gules, a crescent between three mullets argent (Hansford)
- 3: Argent, on a fess azure a lion passant or (Passbury)

Langley was a historic estate in the parish of Yarnscombe, Devon, situated one mile north-east of the village of Yarnscombe. It was long the seat of a junior branch of the Pollard family of Way in the parish of St Giles in the Wood, Devon, 3 miles to the south.

== Descent ==
=== de Langley ===
A family of this name is not recorded in surviving records, however Richard Langley of Bawley in the parish of Braunton, Devon, may have been an ancestor of Emma Doddiscombe, wife of John I Pollard of Way (see below).

=== Britton ===
According to Risdon (d. 1640), the family of Britton held Langley at time unspecified. On the failure of the male line, a daughter of the family brought Langley to her husband Roger Pollard "who planted himself so firmly in this place that his posterity have hitherto possessed the same".

=== Pollard ===
The descent of the Pollard family of Langley is as follows:

==== John I Pollard of Way ====
John I Pollard of Way, who married Emma Doddiscombe, one of the five daughters and co-heiress of Sir John Doddescombe of Doddescombe Leigh, Devon. Sir John Doddescombe's father was possibly Walter Doddescombe, whose wife was Susan Langley, daughter of Richard Langley of Bawley, Braunton. Langley eventually passed to the descendants of John I Pollard's third son Roger Pollard, but initially descended to his second son Richard Pollard.

==== Richard Pollard ====
Richard Pollard, second son, who married Thomasine Cruwys, a daughter and co-heiress of William Cruwys, a junior member of the Cruwys family of Cruwys Morchard, Devon

=== Poyntz ===
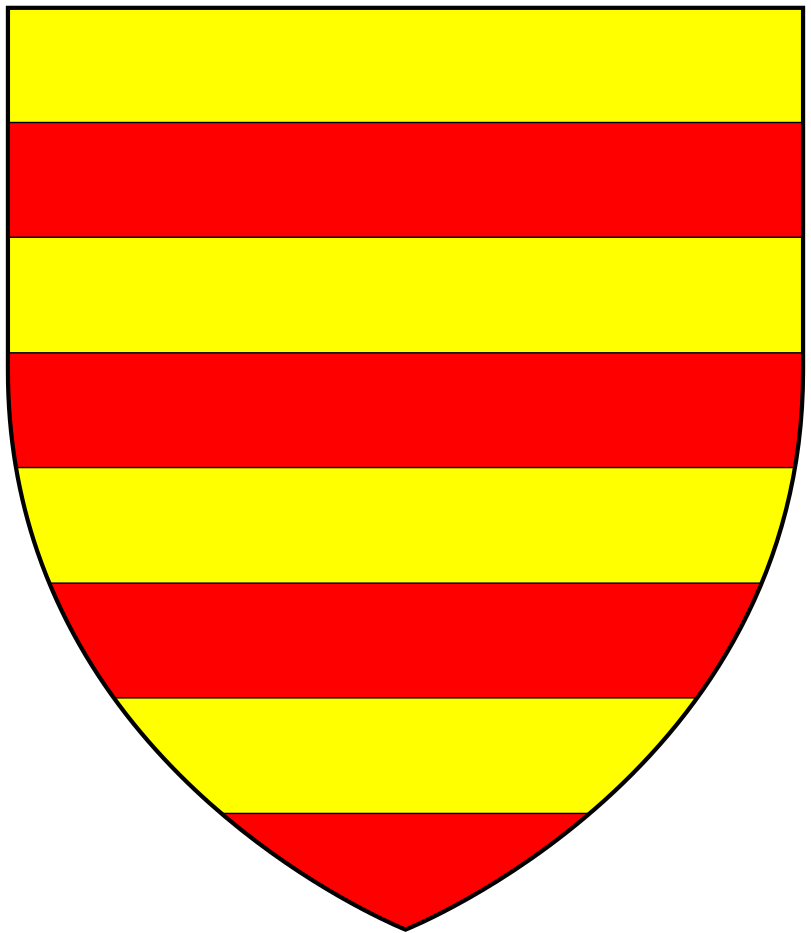
Arms of Poyntz: Barry of eight or and gules

- Humphry Poyntz (d. 1487), "of Langley", who married Elizabeth Pollard, daughter of Richard Pollard by his wife Thomasine Cruwys. He was the younger son of Nicholas Poyntz (d. 1461) of Iron Acton in Gloucestershire, by his first wife Elizabeth Mills, daughter of Sir Edward Mills of Horscomb, Gloucestershire. Humphry's nephew was Sir Robert Poyntz (d. 1520), a supporter of Henry Tudor, 1st Earl of Richmond at the Battle of Bosworth in 1485, who knighted him on that battlefield, and who after his accession as King Henry VII visited Sir Robert at Iron Acton in 1486. Humphry Poyntz does not appear to have left male progeny by his wife Elizabeth Pollard, only a daughter Katherine Poyntz, wife of Fulke Prideaux (1472-1531) of Adeston, Holbeton and Theuborough, Sutcombe, both in Devon, and ancestor of the Prideaux Baronets. Following the death of Humphry Poyntz in 1487, apparently without male progeny to inherit, Langley reverted to the Pollard family. It is not known whether the 17th century "Pointz" family of Northcote in the parish of Bittadon in North Devon was related to Humphrey Poyntz of Langley. The mural monument of Edward Pointz (f. 1691) survives in Bittadon Church and shows the arms of Poyntz of Iron Acton, and the Poyntz canting crest of a clenched fist (French: poing). the heir of this family was the Barbor family of Fremington.

=== Pollard (reversion) ===
==== Roger Pollard ====
Roger Pollard, third son of John I Pollard of Way by his wife Emma Doddiscombe. He appears to have married twice, in order unknown:

  - to Eline Hansford, a daughter and co-heiress of "Hansford of Passburye" (according to the 1620 Heraldic Visitation of Devon) alias Hanksford, from whom the Pollards inherited also the estate of Northcott in the parish of Burrington (Elinor, co-heiress of "Hansford & Passburye" in Colby's edition of the 1620 Heraldic Visitation of Devon and Pollard's manuscript.)
  - to the daughter and heiress of Britton of Langley (according to Risdon)

==== William Pollard ====
William Pollard (son by marriage to Eline Hansford), who married Elizabeth Hatch, daughter of John Hatch (1394-1477) of Wooleigh, in the parish of Upcott (or Beaford,) and widow of John III Bury (d. 1479) lord of the manor of Colleton in the parish of Chulmleigh, Devon.

==== Patrick Pollard ====
Patrick Pollard (son), who married Margerie Bury, a daughter of his uterine half-brother William Bury of Colleton, son of John III Bury (d. 1479)

==== George Pollard ====
George Pollard (2nd son), who married Thomazine Coplestone, a daughter of John III Copleston (1475-1550) "The Great Copleston" of Copleston, Devon, by his second wife Katherine Bridges, daughter of Raphe Bridges.

His second son, also George Pollard (died 1617), was Gentleman Usher to Queen Elizabeth I (1558-1603) and Black Rod to her successor King James I (1603-1625). He married secondly Elizabeth Leche, widow of Anthony Wingfield, a half-sister of Elizabeth Talbot, Countess of Shrewsbury (c. 1527-1608) ("Bess of Hardwick"). His daughters by his first marriage were Maids of Honour to Queen Elizabeth I, and his second wife was Mother of the Maids.

==== Richard I Pollard (d. 1626) ====
Richard I Pollard (d. 1626) (eldest son), who married Mary Molford, daughter of Roger Molford of Cadbury.

==== Richard II Pollard (d. 1660) ====
Richard II Pollard (d. 1660) (son), who married Joane Philipp, a daughter and co-heiress of John Philipp of Plymouth, by whom he had issue 6 sons and 7 daughters. It is possibly he (or his father) who erected the surviving heraldic panel above the front door of Langley Barton showing the arms of Pollard in four quarters and the initials "RP". He may have been the Richard Pollard who between 1640 and 1651 was the "Gentleman Steward" to the princely household of Henry Bourchier, 5th Earl of Bath (1593–1654) at Tawstock Court, 3 miles north of Langley. However it is known that the wife of the steward Richard Pollard was Sara Voysin (d. 1652) (marriage at Swimbridge, near Tawstock, on 14 Apr 1646) of Geneva, Switzerland, a "gentlewoman of impeccable antecedents in Continental Protestantism", who was an attendant of the Earl's wife, and whose surviving mural monument in Tawstock Church is inscribed as follows:

"M(emoriae) S(acrum) Here under lieth the remains of Sara the wife of Richard Pollard Gent. Educated in the French and English courts, and thought worthy to attend on the Right Hon: the Countisse of Westmoreland, and by her, recommended to wait on her most dear daughter Lady Rachel Countisse of Bathe. This Sara was daughter to Monsr: Voysin, a Syndique of Gineva, who most honorably lost his life in defence of that free City, her grandfather was the learned Henricus Stephanus, And Isaac Casaubon was her uncle. She died 30th Jan. MDCLII".

==== George Pollard (1606-pre 1659) ====
George Pollard (1606-pre1659) (eldest son), died without progeny.

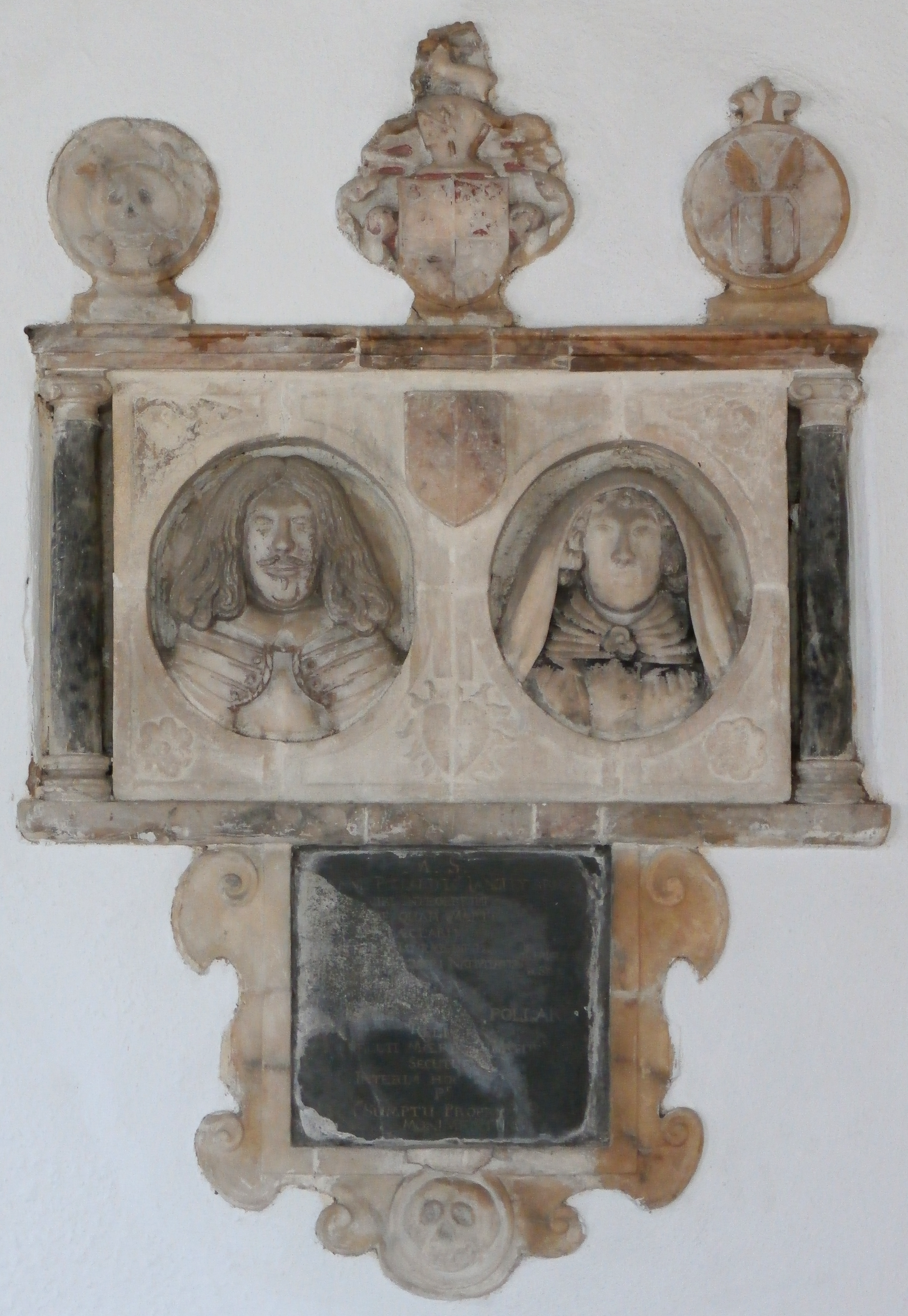
Mural monument to John Pollard (d. 1667) of Langley, and his wife, name uncertain, possibly Sarah Addington. Yarnscombe Church

==== John Pollard (d. 1668) ====
John Pollard (d. 1668) (brother), who married Sara (Addington?), possibly a member of the Addington family of Leigh, Devon, originally from Harlowbury, Essex. He died without progeny. His mural monument survives in Yarnscombe Church, much worn. It displays two busts in roundels, to the left John Pollard and to the right his wife. On a black tablet underneath, with damage, is inscribed the following Latin text:

M(emoriae) S(acrum) Johannis Pollard de Langley, Armigeri, viri integerrimi (virtut)e quam Marte praeclari (qui obiit) Novemb(rensis) die 12, sua aetatis ...., Domini Nostri nativitatis Christi .... Et conjux ..... Pollard relicta [veluti maerens turtur] secutura interim hoc p(osui)t [sumptu proprio] monumentum ("sacred to the memory of John Pollard of Langley, Esquire, a man as much undiminished in virtue as famous for martial prowess (who died) on the 12th day of November in the year of his age ... in the year of the birth of our Lord Christ .... His wife .... Pollard [just like a mournful turtle-dove] about to follow him, meanwhile placed [at her own expense] this monument".)

Above at the centre top of the monument is shown an escutcheon showing arms quarterly of four, 1 & 4: Argent, a chevron sable between three escallops gules (Pollard); 2nd: Argent, a chevron sable between three mullets pierced gules(de Via (alias de Way) of Way in the parish of St Giles in the Wood); 3rd: On a fess wavy a lion passant (Lovering? of Weare Giffard and Hudscott). Above atop a helm is the crest of Pollard, a stag passant (?). At the left top (and at bottom) is shown a human skull, at right top an open Bible with wings attached at top. Between the two portrait busts is an escutcheon of Pollard impaling two bars in chief three roundels (?), which should be the arms of his wife, whose family is not known. These are not the arms of Addington, which family she is stated in certain sources to be from.
