= Horwood, Devon =

Village in Devon, England

Coordinates: 51.028°N 4.137°W

Horwood
- St Michael's church, Horwood

- Location within Devon
- Civil parish: Horwood, Lovacott and Newton Tracey
- District: North Devon
- Shire county: Devon
- Region: South West
- Country: England
- Sovereign state: United Kingdom

Horwood is a village and former civil parish, now in the parish of Horwood, Lovacott and Newton Tracey, in the North Devon district, in the county of Devon, England, situated about 4 miles east of the town of Bideford. In 1961 the civil parish had a population of 79. On 1 April 1986 the parish was abolished and merged with Newton Tracey.

The parish church of St Michael is Grade I listed.
