= St Giles in the Wood =

Village and civil parish in Devon, England

Coordinates: 50.951°N 4.087°W

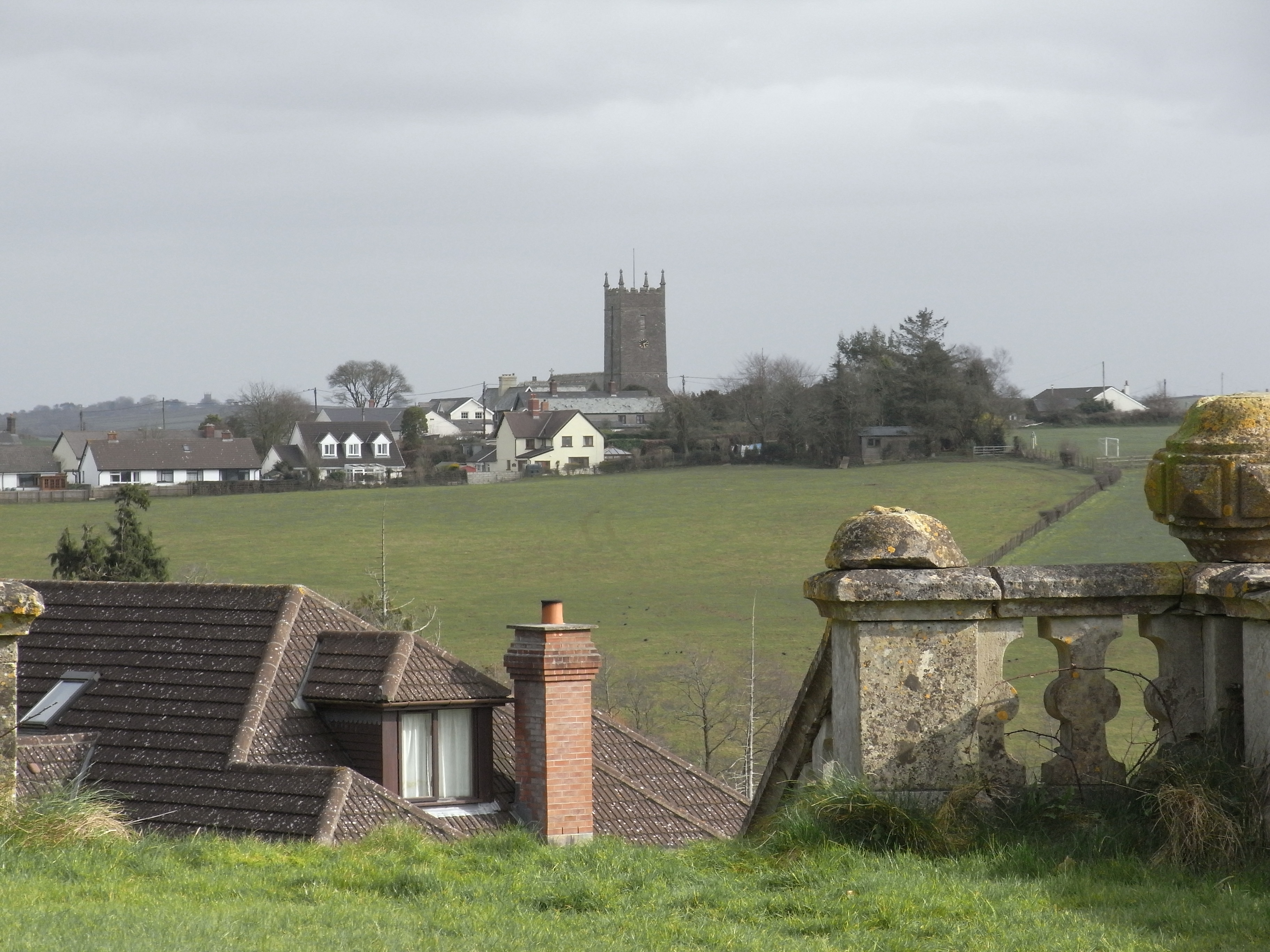
- View of St Giles in the Wood, looking eastwards from the ruined terrace of Stevenstone House

- Location within Devon
- Population: 566 (2001 census)
- Civil parish: St Giles in the Wood
- District: Torridge
- Shire county: Devon
- Region: South West
- Country: England
- Sovereign state: United Kingdom

St Giles in the Wood is a village and civil parish in the Torridge district of Devon, England. The village lies about 2.5 miles east of the town of Great Torrington, and the parish, which had a population of 566 in 2001 compared with 623 in 1901, is surrounded clockwise from the north by the parishes of Huntshaw, Yarnscombe, High Bickington, Roborough, Beaford, Little Torrington and Great Torrington. Most of the Victorian terraced cottages in the village, on the east side of the church, were built by the Rolle Estate.

Within the parish are several historic residences: Stevenstone (the historic seat of the Rolle family), Way Barton (home of the Pollard family), Winscott (where Tristram Risdon, author of the Survey of Devonshire, was born, c. 1580), Dodscott and Woodleigh Barton. There are also a number of hamlets including High Bullen, Healand and Kingscott (where there is a Baptist chapel dating from 1833, and a late 19th-century school), and in the south-west of the parish is the Royal Horticultural Society's Rosemoor Garden.

== Parish church ==
The large parish church in the village is dedicated to St Giles the Hermit and came into being in 1309 when licence was obtained from the Bishop of Exeter to build a chapel of ease because the church at Great Torrington was considered too far for the convenience of the local inhabitants.

Mark Rolle funded its restoration in 1862–3 and many old monuments were retained; these include the monument and effigy of Thomas Chafe (d. 1648) of Dodscott, three monumental brasses, of Alenora Pollard (d. 1430), Margaret Rolle of Stevenstone (d. 1592) and a small brass of her husband John Rolle (d.1570). There are also 19th- and 20th-century monuments to the Rolle family.

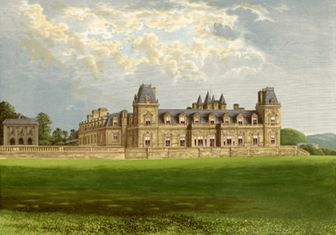
Stevenstone House, built by Hon. Mark Rolle between 1868 and 1872, demolished

== Historic residences ==
=== Stevenstone ===
The most notable historic residence within the parish is Stevenstone House, now demolished, the seat of the Rolle family since the 16th century, which when held by Hon. Mark Rolle (d.1907) were the largest landowners in Devon with over 55,000 acres.

=== Way Barton ===
Way Barton is about 2 miles north-east of the village. W. G. Hoskins described it in 1959 as the origin of the Pollard family, having been acquired by them from the de la Way family at some time before 1242.

=== Winscott ===
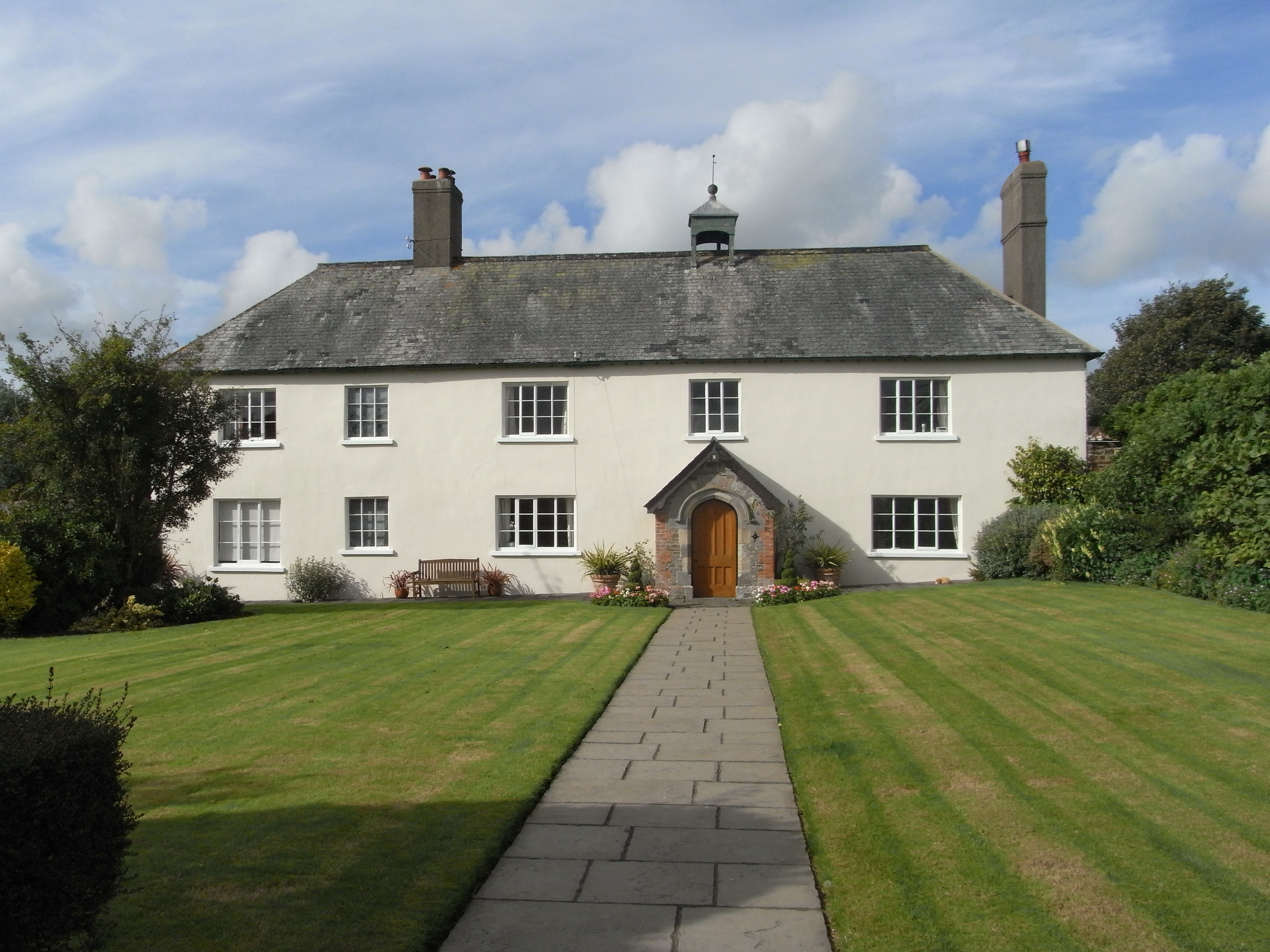
The present house of Winscott Barton

The present large farmhouse is built on the site of the mansion house belonging to Tristram Risdon, an early historian of Devon who died in 1640. In the 16th century Winscott was the property of the Barry family, according to Risdon a branch of the ancient de Barry family that had large landholdings around Cork in Ireland. After passing through the Risdon family, it descended into the family of Northcote, ancestors of Stafford Northcote, 1st Earl of Iddesleigh.

=== Dodscott ===
The hamlet of Dodscott lies about 3/4 mile NE of the parish church and 3/4 NW of Winscott. It was listed in the Domesday Book of 1086 when it was one of 28 manors held by Gotshelm, who had sub-enfeoffed it to his tenant Walter of Burgundy. It was the cottage of the cottar Doda before 1066, and paid tax for one virgate of land, with land for 1 1/2 ploughs.

In the 16th century Dodscott was the residence of Thomas Chafe (1585-1648), the brother-in-law of his neighbour Tristram Risdon of Winscott. Risdon wrote a brief paragraph on the history of Dodscott but did not mention how it had come into the possession of Chafe. The Chafe family had originated at "Chafecombe" (modern Chaffcombe) 2 miles north-east of Chard in Somerset. He was the third son of Thomas Chafe (1560-1604), notary public for Exeter and twice mayor, by his wife Dorothy Shorte, daughter of John Shorte (1524-1587). His eldest brother was William Chafe (d. 1604). His next eldest brother was John Chafe (d. 1619), a merchant of Exeter who married Anne May of North Molton (sometimes given as "Mayho", thus possibly of the Mayhew family of Boringdon Hall connected by marriage with the Parkers of North Molton, later Earls of Morley), whose son was Thomas Chafe (1611-1662), MP.

== Sources ==
- Cherry, Bridget; Pevsner, Nikolaus (1989). The Buildings of England: Devon (second ed.). Penguin Books. ISBN 0-14-071050-7.
