= Yarnscombe =

Village in Devon, England

Coordinates: 50°59′37″N 4°03′09″W

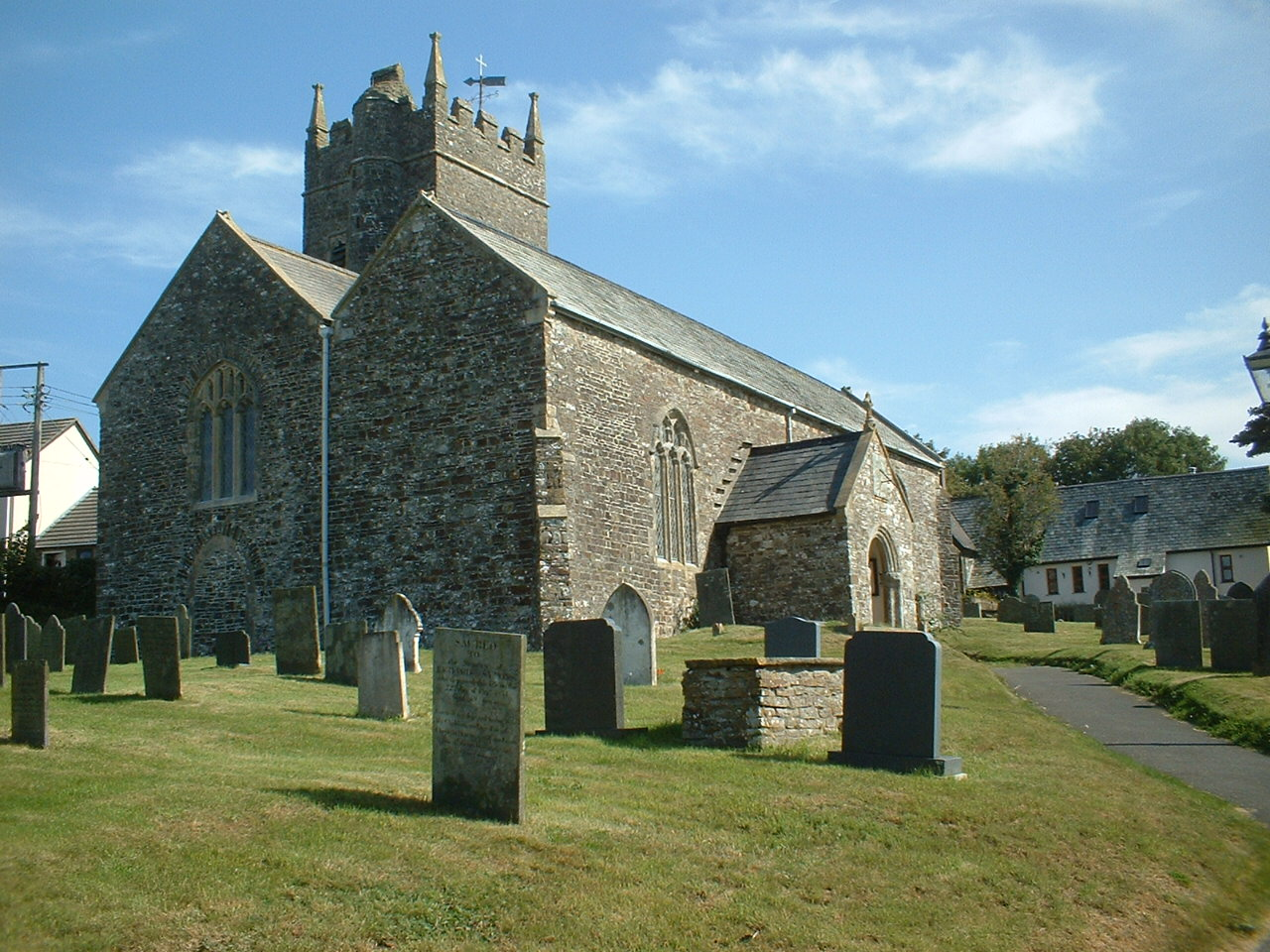
- St Andrews Church, Yarnscombe

- Location within Devon
- Population: 300 (2001 census)
- Civil parish: Yarnscombe
- District: Torridge
- Shire county: Devon
- Region: South West
- Country: England
- Sovereign state: United Kingdom

Yarnscombe is a small village and parish in the Torridge area of Devon, England. It is situated approximately 5 miles (8 km) from Great Torrington and 7 miles (11 km) from Barnstaple. In the year 2001 census the population was recorded at 300.

== Parish Church ==
The parish church is dedicated to St Andrew. The nave, chancel and transeptal north tower probably date from the 13th century, while the south aisle and porch are 15th century. A vestry was added in 1846. The position of the tower is unusual for Devon. The Church contains some medieval tiles and glass. The 15th century altar-tomb on the north side of the chancel is that of John (or Nicholas) Cockworthy, of the estate of Cockworthy in the parish, and his wife. The church was repaired in 1852.

== Village Hall ==
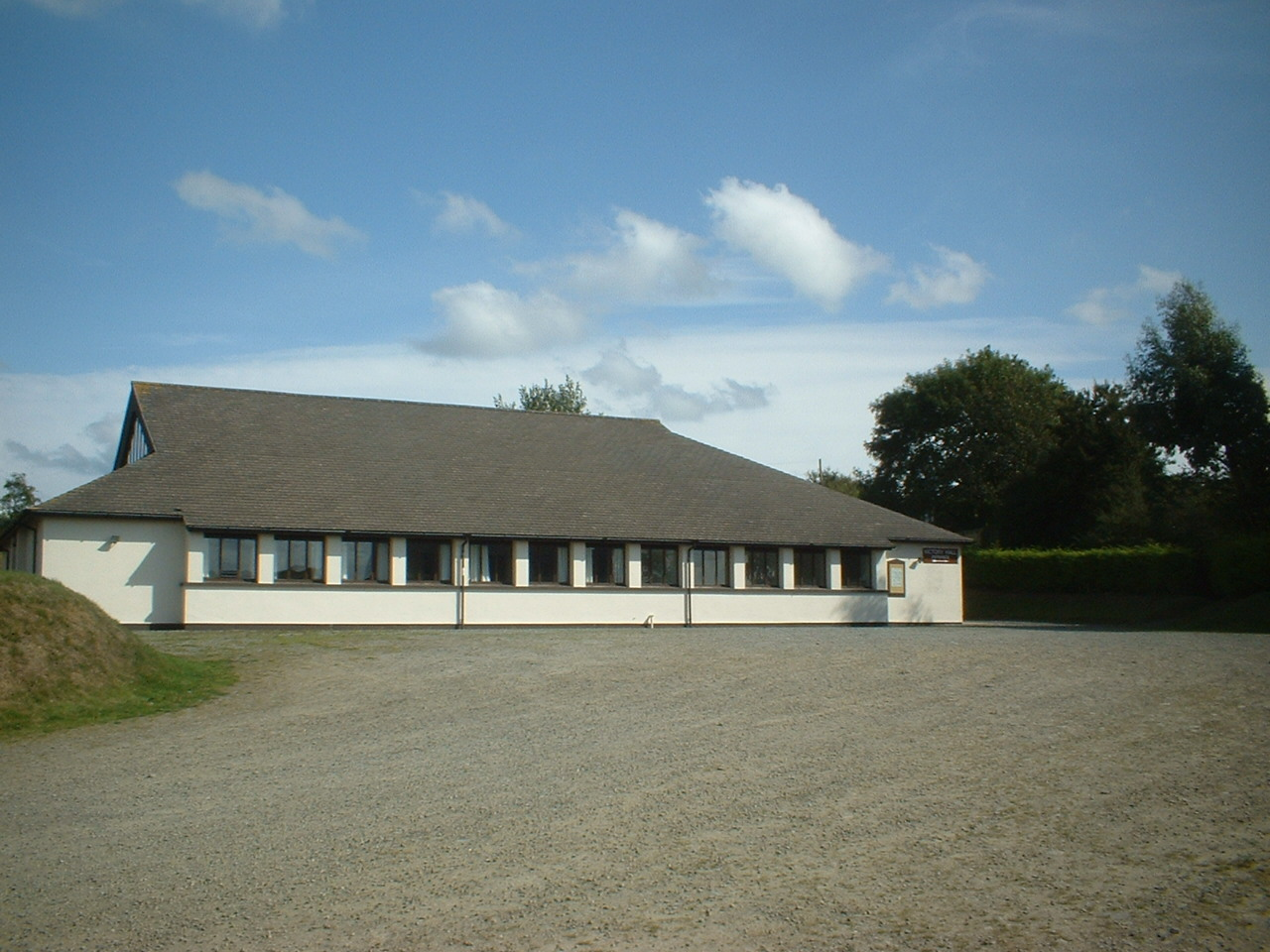
The Village Hall, Yarnscombe

The Village Hall which is available to hire for parties, wedding receptions etc. The Hall is also home to a variety of activities such as a Youth Club, Bingo, Badminton, Skittles Teams and Short Mat Bowling, all of which are open to new members/participators.

== Methodist Church ==
Yarnscombe Methodist Church was built in 1908 replacing a wood building built in 1861. The original building was a Bible Christian chapel described by the North Devon Journal as "a wooded structure, built upon six wheels, the object of which is to prevent its becoming the property of the owner of the soil on the expiration of the lease on which it is granted to the present lessee." Shortly after the foundation stones for the new church were laid, the Bible Christian Church in England merged with other Methodist denominations to form the United Methodist Church. The Yarnscombe United Methodist Church closed in 1993, and the building was converted to a private residence.

== History ==
The settlement was mentioned in the Domesday Book and it formed part of Hartland Hundred. The name of the village derives from the Old English earnes-cumb, meaning eagle valley. It falls within Torrington Deanery for ecclesiastical purposes.

=== Historic estates ===
- Langley, the historic seat of a junior branch of the Pollard family.
