= List of churches in Torridge =

The following is a list of churches in Torridge.

== Active churches ==
The civil parishes of East Putford, Luffincott and Northcott have no active churches.

The district has an estimated 113 churches for 67,000 inhabitants, a ratio of one church for every 593 people.

Name	Civil parish	Web	Dedication	Founded	Denomination	Benefice	Notes
St James, Abbots Bickington	Abbots Bickington		James		Church of England	Bradworthy etc.	
St Helen, Abbotsham	Abbotsham		Helen?		Church of England		
Abbotsham Baptist Church	Abbotsham				Baptist Union		
All Saints, Alverdiscott	Alverdiscott		All Saints		Church of England	Two Rivers Mission Community	
Alverdiscott Methodist Church	Alverdiscott				Methodist	Torridge Circuit	
St Andrew, Alwington	Alwington		Andrew	Medieval	Church of England	Hartland Coast Mission C	
Alwington Methodist Church	Alwington				Methodist	Torridge Circuit	
St James, Ashreigney	Ashreigney		James		Church of England	Ashreigney, Winkleigh etc.	
Zion Methodist Church, Ashreigney	Ashreigney		Zion		Methodist	South Molton & Ringsash Circuit	
St Peter ad Vincula, Ashwater	Ashwater		Peter		Church of England	Ashwater etc.	
All Saints, Beaford	Beaford		All Saints		Church of England	Two Rivers Mission Community	
Beaford Methodist Church	Beaford				Methodist	Ilfracombe & Barnstaple Circuit	
St Mary, Bideford	Bideford		Mary	Medieval	Church of England		Rebuilt 1865
Sacred Heart, Bideford	Bideford		Sacred Heart	1888	Roman Catholic	Bideford & Torrington Parish	
Bideford Baptist Church	Bideford			c. 1820	Baptist Union		
Bideford Methodist Church	Bideford				Methodist	Torridge Circuit	
Lavington United Reformed Church	Bideford			C17th	URC		Current building 1869
Bethel Free Church Bideford	Bideford		Bethel	1877	FIEC		AKA Bideford Town Mission
Bideford Salvation Army	Bideford				Salvation Army		
North Road Chapel	Bideford			1850s	Independent		Of Plymouth Brethren origins
Bideford Quaker Meeting	Bideford				Quakers		
Bideford Liberal Catholic Church	Bideford				Liberal Catholic		
St Mary, Black Torrington	Black Torrington		Mary	Medieval	Church of England	Black Torrington Benefice	
Hope Chapel, Black Torrington	Black Torrington				Methodist	Torridge Circuit	
Emmanuel Methodist Chapel, Chilla	Black Torrington (Chilla)		Jesus	pre-1893	Methodist	West Devon Circuit	Current building 1893
All Saints, Bradford	Bradford		All Saints	Medieval	Church of England	Black Torrington Benefice	
St John the Baptist, Bradworthy	Bradworthy		John the Baptist		Church of England	Bradworthy etc.	
Bradworthy Methodist Church	Bradworthy				Methodist	Bude & Holsworthy Circuit	
St Bridget, Bridgerule	Bridgerule		Brigid of Kildare	Medieval	Church of England	Holsworthy Benefice	
Bridgerule Methodist Church	Bridgerule				Methodist	Bude & Holsworthy Circuit	
St Nicholas, Broadwoodwidger	Broadwoodwidger		Nicholas		Church of England	Lifton etc.	
Broadwoodwidger Methodist Church	Broadwoodwidger				Methodist	Launceston Area Circuit	
SS Mary & Benedict, Buckland Brewer	Buckland Brewer		Mary & Benedict	Medieval	Church of England	Hartland Coast Mission C	
Buckland Brewer Methodist Church	Buckland Brewer				Methodist	Torridge Circuit	
Thornhillhead Methodist Church	Bd Brewer (Thornhillhead)				Methodist	Torridge Circuit	
St Mary & Holy Trinity, Buckland Filleigh	Buckland Filleigh		Mary & Trinity		Church of England	Shebbear etc.	
St Michael, Bulkworthy	Bulkworthy		Michael		Church of England	Bradworthy etc.	ACNY erroneously lists Exton church in this benefice
St Leonard, Clawton	Clawton		Leonard of Noblac		Church of England	Ashwater etc.	
Buckhorn Methodist Church, Clawton	Clawton				Methodist	Bude & Holsworthy Circuit	
All Saints, Clovelly	Clovelly		All Saints	Medieval	Church of England	Hartland Coast Mission C	Village also contains St Peter's chapel (not used regularly)
St John the Baptist & the Seven Maccabees	Cookbury		John B & 7 Maccabees	Medieval	Church of England	Black Torrington Benefice	Unique dedication
St Edmund, Dolton	Dolton		Edmund the Martyr	Medieval	Church of England	Dolton etc.	
Dolton Baptist Church	Dolton				Baptist Union		
St Peter, Dowland	Dowland		Peter		Church of England	Dolton etc.	
SS Mary & Gregory, Frithelstock	Frithelstock		Mary & Pope Gregory I	Medieval	Church of England	Torringtons etc.	
St Michael & All Angels, Great Torrington	Great Torrington		Michael & Angels	Medieval	Church of England	Torringtons etc.	
Holy Family, Great Torrington	Great Torrington		Holy Family		Roman Catholic	Bideford & Torrington Parish	
Torrington Baptist Church	Great Torrington				Baptist Union		
Torrington Methodist Church	Great Torrington				Methodist	Torridge Circuit	
Grosvenor Church Torrington	Great Torrington			2015			Meets in primary school. Plant from Grosvenor, Barnstaple
SS Peter & James, Halwill	Halwill		Peter & James		Church of England	Ashwater etc.	
St Nectan, Hartland	Hartland		Nectan of Hartland	Medieval	Church of England	Hartland Coast Mission C	
Hartland Methodist Church	Hartland				Methodist	Bude & Holsworthy Circuit	
St Mary, High Bickington	High Bickington		Mary		Church of England	Two Rivers Mission Community	
High Bickington Methodist Church	High Bickington				Methodist	Ilfracombe & Barnstaple Circuit	
St Petroc, Hollacombe	Hollacombe		Petroc		Church of England	Holsworthy Benefice	
SS Peter & Paul, Holsworthy	Holsworthy		Peter & Paul	Medieval	Church of England	Holsworthy Benefice	Grade II* listed
Holsworthy Methodist Church	Holsworthy				Methodist	Bude & Holsworthy Circuit	
Chilsworthy Methodist Church	Holsworthy Hamlets (Chilsworthy)				Methodist	Bude & Holsworthy Circuit	
St James the Less, Huish	Huish		James the Less		Church of England	Shebbear etc.	
St Mary Magdalene, Huntshaw	Huntshaw		Mary Magdalene		Church of England	Two Rivers Mission Community	
Holy Trinity, Landcross	Landcross		Trinity		Church of England	Littleham, Landcross, Weare	
All Saints, Langtree	Langtree		All Saints		Church of England	Shebbear etc.	
Langtree Methodist Church	Langtree				Methodist	Torridge Circuit	
St Giles, Little Torrington	Little Torrington		Giles	Medieval	Church of England	Torringtons etc.	
St Mary Magdalene, Taddiport	Little Torrington (Taddiport)		Mary Magdalene	Medieval	Church of England	Torringtons etc.	
St Swithun, Littleham	Littleham		Swithun		Church of England	Littleham, Landcross, Weare	
Littleham Methodist Church	Littleham				Methodist	Torridge Circuit	
St Helen, Lundy	Lundy (unparished area)		Elen	Medieval	Church of England	Hartland Coast Mission C	Rebuilt 1896-1897. Summer services only
All Saints, Merton	Merton		All Saints		Church of England	Shebbear etc.	
Holy Trinity, Milton Damerel	Milton Damerel		Trinity		Church of England	Bradworthy etc.	
Milton Damerel Methodist Church	Milton Damerel				Methodist	Torridge Circuit	
St George, Monkleigh	Monkleigh		George		Church of England	Littleham, Landcross, Weare	
St Petrock, Newton St Petrock	Newton St Petrock		Petroc		Church of England	Shebbear etc.	
Newton St Petrock Baptist Church	Newton St Petrock				Baptist Union		
St Margaret, Northam	Northam		Margaret the Virgin	Medieval	Church of England	Appledore, Northam, W'ward Ho!	
Northam Methodist Church	Northam				Methodist	Torridge Circuit	
St Mary, Appledore	Northam (Appledore)		Mary	Medieval	Church of England	Appledore, Northam, W'ward Ho!	
Appledore Baptist Church	Northam (Appledore)				Baptist Union		
Holy Trinity, Westward Ho!	Northam (Westward Ho!)		Trinity	1869	Church of England	Appledore, Northam, W'ward Ho!	
Westward Ho! Baptist Church	Northam (Westward Ho!)				Baptist Union		
St Pancras, Pancrasweek	Pancrasweek		Pancras of Rome	Medieval	Church of England	Holsworthy Benefice	
St James, Parkham	Parkham		James	Medieval	Church of England	Hartland Coast Mission C	
Parkham Methodist Church	Parkham				Methodist	Torridge Circuit	
St Peter, Petersmarland	Peters Marland		Peter		Church of England	Shebbear etc.	
St Petrock, Petrockstowe	Petrockstowe		Petroc		Church of England	Shebbear etc.	
Petrockstowe Methodist Church	Petrockstowe				Methodist	West Devon Circuit	
St Swithun, Pyworthy	Pyworthy		Swithun	Medieval	Church of England	Holsworthy Benefice	
St Peter, Roborough	Roborough		Peter		Church of England	Two Rivers Mission Community	
Ebberley Lodge Methodist Church	Roborough (Ebberly)				Methodist	Ilfracombe & Barnstaple Circuit	
St Giles, St Giles in the Wood	St Giles in the Wood		Giles		Church of England	Two Rivers Mission Community	
St Giles, St Giles on the Heath	St Giles on the Heath		Giles		Church of England	Boyton group	
St Giles Methodist Church	St Giles on the Heath				Methodist	Launceston Area Circuit	
St Michael, Shebbear	Shebbear		Michael		Church of England	Shebbear etc.	
Lake Shebbear Methodist Church	Shebbear				Methodist	Torridge Circuit	
St Lawrence, Sheepwash	Sheepwash		Lawrence		Church of England	Shebbear etc.	
Sheepwash Methodist Church	Sheepwash				Methodist	Torridge Circuit	
St Andrew, Sutcombe	Sutcombe		Andrew		Church of England	Bradworthy etc.	
Holy Cross, Tetcott	Tetcott		Cross		Church of England	Ashwater etc.	
St Peter, Thornbury	Thornbury		Peter	Medieval	Church of England	Black Torrington Benefice	
(Holsworthy) Beacon Methodist Church	Thornbury (Hols. Beacon)				Methodist	Bude & Holsworthy Circuit	
Woodacott Methodist Church	Thornbury (Woodacott)				Methodist	Bude & Holsworthy Circuit	
St Bridget, Virginstow	Virginstow		Brigid of Kildare		Church of England	Boyton group	
Holy Trinity, Weare Giffard	Weare Giffard		Trinity		Church of England	Littleham, Landcross, Weare	
St Nectan, Welcombe	Welcombe		Nectan of Hartland	Medieval	Church of England	Hartland Coast Mission C	
St Stephen, Putford	West Putford		Stephen		Church of England	Bradworthy etc.	
All Saints, Winkleigh	Winkleigh		All Saints	Medieval	Church of England	Ashreigney, Winkleigh etc.	
Winkleigh Methodist Church	Winkleigh				Methodist	West Devon Circuit	
Stable Green Methodist Church	Winkleigh (Stable Green)				Methodist	South Molton & Ringsash Circuit	
All Hallows, Woolfardisworthy West	Woolfardisworthy		All Saints		Church of England	Hartland Coast Mission C	
Woolsery Methodist Church	Woolfardisworthy				Methodist	Bude & Holsworthy Circuit	
St Anne, Bucks Mills	Wool'sworthy (Bucks Mills)		Anne	1862	Church of England	Hartland Coast Mission C	
St Andrew, Yarnscombe	Yarnscombe		Andrew	Medieval	Church of England	Two Rivers Mission Community	

== Defunct churches ==
Name	Civil parish	Dedication	Founded	Redundant	Denomination	Notes
SS Philip & James the Less, East Putford	East Putford	Philip & James the Less		C20th	Church of England	Deconsecrated and used as farm building, now overgrown
St James, Luffincott	Luffincott	James	Medieval	1975	Church of England	Churches Conservation Trust 1979
