= Grade II* listed buildings in Torridge =

There are over 20,000 Grade II* listed buildings in England. This page is a list of these buildings in the district of Torridge in Devon.

== Torridge ==
Name	Location	Type	Completed (Note: The date given is the date used by Historic England as significant for the initial building or that of an important part in the structure's description.)	Date designated	Grid ref. (Note: Sometimes known as OSGB36, the grid reference is based on the British national grid reference system used by the Ordnance Survey.) Geo-coordinates	Entry number (Note: The "List Entry Number" is a unique number assigned to each listed building and scheduled monument by Historic England.)	Image
Church of St James	Abbots Bickington, Torridge	Parish Church	c. 1300	14 February 1958	SS3847613261; 50°53′46″N 4°17′54″W	1105113	Church of St James More images
Church of St Helen	Abbotsham	Anglican Church	Late 19th century	20 February 1958	SS4245926415; 51°00′56″N 4°14′50″W	1104408	Church of St Helen More images
Church of All Saints	Alverdiscott	Anglican Church	1579	4 October 1960	SS5195025257; 51°00′27″N 4°06′42″W	1170720	Church of All Saints More images
Portledge Manor	Alwington	Country house	Early 19th century	22 January 1952	SS3942224720; 50°59′58″N 4°17′23″W	1170778	Portledge Manor More images
Church of St James	Ashreigney	Parish Church	Pre-Perpendicular	4 October 1960	SS6286313626; 50°54′21″N 3°57′07″W	1104609	Church of St James More images
Bell Tower Cottage	Ashwater	House	18th century	21 January 1986	SX3864695234; 50°44′03″N 4°17′16″W	1104661	Upload Photo
Old Parsonage	Beaford	House	C20	16 February 1989	SS5508115641; 50°55′19″N 4°03′48″W	1309063	Upload Photo
Woolleigh Barton and adjoining Former Chapel	Woolleigh, Beaford	Farmhouse	15th century or Earlier	16 January 1952	SS5317916872; 50°55′57″N 4°05′27″W	1105074	Upload Photo
Church of St Mary	Bideford	Parish Church	Probably 15th century	8 November 1949	SS4538626423; 51°00′59″N 4°12′20″W	1200893	Church of St Mary More images
Lavington United Reformed Church	Bideford	Congregational Chapel	1856-9	19 April 1993	SS4535126826; 51°01′12″N 4°12′23″W	1355163	Lavington United Reformed Church More images
Masonic Hall, Caretaker's House at Rear and Garden Walls at Left and Rear	Bideford	House	1692	8 November 1949	SS4536526825; 51°01′12″N 4°12′22″W	1025135	Masonic Hall, Caretaker's House at Rear and Garden Walls at Left and Rear More images
Northdown Hall (part of Stella Maris School)	Bideford	House	Early 19th century	24 July 1974	SS4511826980; 51°01′17″N 4°12′35″W	1200936	Upload Photo
4 and 4a Bridgeland Street	Bideford, Torridge	House	1692	8 November 1949	SS4545426832; 51°01′12″N 4°12′17″W	1200874	Upload Photo
27 Bridgeland Street	Bideford	House	Probably early 1690s	8 November 1949	SS4540526794; 51°01′11″N 4°12′20″W	1025052	Upload Photo
Nos 28 and 28a, Bridgeland St, including Pump and Milestone in Courtyard	Bideford	Apartment	1949	8 November 1949	SS4541826785; 51°01′11″N 4°12′19″W	1200879	Upload Photo
31 Bridgeland Street	Bideford	Apartment	1992	6 May 1992	SS4546026796; 51°01′11″N 4°12′17″W	1025001	Upload Photo
Old Ford	Bideford	Farmhouse	19th century	8 November 1949	SS4531025908; 51°00′42″N 4°12′23″W	1200933	Upload Photo
74 and 74a High Street	Bideford	Apartment	1999	8 November 1949	SS4533726601; 51°01′05″N 4°12′23″W	1208979	Upload Photo
Church of St Mary	Black Torrington	Parish Church	15th century	14 February 1958	SS4649305709; 50°49′50″N 4°10′52″W	1105121	Church of St Mary More images
Higher Braundsworthy Farmhouse	Black Torrington	Farmhouse	c. 1500	26 January 1989	SS4387805856; 50°49′52″N 4°13′06″W	1326550	Upload Photo
Hole Farmhouse	Black Torrington	Farmhouse	16th century	26 January 1989	SS4701903822; 50°48′49″N 4°10′22″W	1105119	Upload Photo
Church of All Saints	Bradford	Parish Church	Norman origins	26 January 1989	SS4212707220; 50°50′34″N 4°14′37″W	1105088	Church of All Saints More images
Highstead Farmhouse	Bradford	Farmhouse	probably by the early 17th century	14 February 1958	SS4197605263; 50°49′31″N 4°14′42″W	1326575	Upload Photo
Church of St John the Baptist	Bradworthy	Anglican Church	18th century	14 February 1958	SS3246813981; 50°54′03″N 4°23′02″W	1163892	Church of St John the Baptist More images
Outbuilding, formerly Chapel, 25 Metres North East of Lower Alsworthy Farmhouse	Alfardisworthy, Bradworthy	Chapel	15th century	14 February 1958	SS2941411765; 50°52′48″N 4°25′35″W	1104971	Upload Photo
Tackbeare Farmhouse	Bridgerule	Manor House	Late 16th century	14 February 1958	SS2574001887; 50°47′25″N 4°28′25″W	1104975	Upload Photo
Palmer Headstone about 37m North of the West Tower of the Church of St Nicholas	Broadwoodwidger	Gravestone	Late 18th century	21 January 1986	SX4111489207; 50°40′51″N 4°15′01″W	1165023	Upload Photo
Upcott	Broadwoodwidger	Farmhouse	late C15/early 16th century or earlier	23 August 1957	SX3966790114; 50°41′19″N 4°16′16″W	1164919	Upload Photo
Church of St Mary and St Benedict	Buckland Brewer	Church	18th century	20 February 1958	SS4189020915; 50°57′57″N 4°15′11″W	1105169	Church of St Mary and St Benedict More images
Buckland House	Buckland Filleigh	Country House	core of earlier house	4 October 1960	SS4646809167; 50°51′42″N 4°10′59″W	1104551	Buckland House More images
Church of St Mary	Buckland Filleigh	Parish Church	Norman	4 October 1960	SS4655309152; 50°51′41″N 4°10′54″W	1104552	Church of St Mary More images
Church of St Michael	Bulkworthy	Church	1874	18 December 1989	SS3947414186; 50°54′17″N 4°17′04″W	1104977	Church of St Michael More images
No 16 including Forecourt Retaining Walls, Railings and Gates	Clovelly	House	Early 18th century	20 February 1958	SS3171824806; 50°59′53″N 4°23′58″W	1104517	Upload Photo
Nos 45/46 and 47	Clovelly	House		20 February 1958	SS3183024852; 50°59′54″N 4°23′53″W	1104522	Nos 45/46 and 47
No 53 (Crazy Kates) and No 54	Clovelly	Fishermans House	Probably 18th century	20 February 1958	SS3184024867; 50°59′55″N 4°23′52″W	1333120	No 53 (Crazy Kates) and No 54
59, 60 and 61	Clovelly	House	Late 17th century or Early 18th century	20 February 1958	SS3186424822; 50°59′53″N 4°23′51″W	1333138	59, 60 and 61
Church of St John the Baptist and the Seven Maccabees	Cookbury	Parish Church	Norman origins	14 February 1958	SS4070806044; 50°49′55″N 4°15′48″W	1162728	Church of St John the Baptist and the Seven Maccabees More images
Chapple Cottage	Dolton	House	circa Mid 16th century	10 March 1988	SS5576510663; 50°52′39″N 4°03′05″W	1333048	Upload Photo
Church of St Edmund	Dolton	Cross	Saxon	4 October 1960	SS5700312012; 50°53′23″N 4°02′04″W	1104629	Church of St Edmund More images
Stafford Barton	Dolton	House	1956	20 December 1956	SS5843011463; 50°53′07″N 4°00′50″W	1104627	Stafford Barton More images
Church of St Michael and All Angels	Great Torrington	Parish Church	Possibly 13th century	19 March 1951	SS4950519196; 50°57′09″N 4°08′38″W	1104787	Church of St Michael and All Angels More images
Market House	Great Torrington	House	1842	19 March 1951	SS4957019087; 50°57′06″N 4°08′35″W	1104742	Market House More images
Palmer House including Garden Wall	Great Torrington	House	1752	19 March 1951	SS4943719233; 50°57′10″N 4°08′42″W	1104777	Palmer House including Garden Wall More images
28 South Street	Great Torrington	House	1701	3 April 1973	SS4950519065; 50°57′05″N 4°08′38″W	1104743	Upload Photo
Church of St Peter and St James	Halwill	Parish Church	14th century or earlier	14 February 1958	SX4272499431; 50°46′23″N 4°13′55″W	1104639	Church of St Peter and St James More images
Winsford Hospital	Halwill Junction, Halwill	Conservatory	C20	15 April 1978	SX4454599993; 50°46′43″N 4°12′23″W	1105657	Upload Photo
Church House	Stoke, Hartland	House	Probably late 15th century	20 February 1958	SS2358124670; 50°59′40″N 4°30′55″W	1146627	Church House More images
Courtyard Wall immediately to West of Blegberry Farmhouse and extending Approximately 50 Metres to the South	Hartland	Farmhouse	1606	20 February 1958	SS2319226135; 51°00′26″N 4°31′18″W	1165704	Upload Photo
Galsham Farmhouse	Hartland	Farmhouse	1682	19 June 1989	SS2450322697; 50°58′37″N 4°30′05″W	1104474	Upload Photo
Higher Brownsham Farmhouse and Barn adjoining to North-west	Brownsham, Hartland	Farmhouse	Early 17th century	20 February 1958	SS2853625946; 51°00′26″N 4°26′43″W	1333156	Higher Brownsham Farmhouse and Barn adjoining to North-west
St Leonards Cottage (north)	Hartland, Torridge	House	18th century or Early 19th century	19 June 1989	SS2488923884; 50°59′16″N 4°29′47″W	1104480	Upload Photo
St Leonards Cottage (south)	Hartland, Torridge	House	c. 1500	19 June 1989	SS2489823869; 50°59′15″N 4°29′46″W	1166060	Upload Photo
Lee Barton and Adjoining Front Garden Walls	Lee Barton, High Bickington, Torridge	Farmhouse	15th century or 16th century	4 October 1960	SS5761820912; 50°58′12″N 4°01′45″W	1326595	Upload Photo
Church of St Peter and St Paul	Holsworthy, Torridge	Anglican Church	1808	1 January 1951	SS3437703907; 50°48′40″N 4°21′08″W	1104945	Church of St Peter and St Paul More images
Derriton Viaduct	Holsworthy, Torridge	Railway Viaduct	1898	18 December 1989	SS3387303531; 50°48′27″N 4°21′33″W	1317898	Derriton Viaduct More images
Church of St James the Less	Huish, Huish, Torridge	Parish Church	Late 15th century or Early 16th century	4 October 1960	SS5337311081; 50°52′50″N 4°05′08″W	1309259	Church of St James the Less More images
Church of St Mary Magdalene	Huntshaw, Torridge	Anglican Church	Early 14th century	4 October 1960	SS5067122892; 50°59′10″N 4°07′44″W	1326528	Church of St Mary Magdalene More images
Church of Holy Trinity	Landcross, Torridge	Anglican Church	Early 19th century	20 February 1958	SS4627523847; 50°59′36″N 4°11′31″W	1105150	Church of Holy Trinity More images
Church (consecration Unknown)	Langtree, Torridge	Parish Church	15th century to the early 16th century	4 October 1960	SS4510915575; 50°55′08″N 4°12′18″W	1104560	Church (consecration Unknown) More images
Chapel of St Mary Magdalene	Taddiport, Little Torrington, Torridge	Chapel	13th century	4 October 1960	SS4877618664; 50°56′51″N 4°09′15″W	1147254	Chapel of St Mary Magdalene More images
Church of St Giles	Little Torrington, Little Torrington, Torridge	Parish Church	15th century	16 February 1989	SS4910116851; 50°55′53″N 4°08′55″W	1105026	Church of St Giles More images
Cross House	Little Torrington, Torridge	Country House	1680-85	4 October 1960	SS4873617532; 50°56′14″N 4°09′15″W	1105022	Cross House More images
South Hole Farmhouse	Little Torrington, Torridge	Farmhouse	Early 17th century	16 February 1989	SS5047215825; 50°55′21″N 4°07′44″W	1105024	Upload Photo
Woodland Farmhouse	Little Torrington, Torridge	Farmhouse	Second half of the 15th century	4 October 1960	SS5039716854; 50°55′54″N 4°07′49″W	1326584	Upload Photo
Church of All Saints	Merton, Merton, Torridge	Parish Church	14th century	4 October 1960	SS5257412031; 50°53′20″N 4°05′51″W	1326588	Church of All Saints More images
Downes House	Merton, Merton, Torridge	Farmhouse	Early-Mid 17th century	4 October 1960	SS5295612312; 50°53′29″N 4°05′32″W	1147488	Upload Photo
Garden Wall Extending to South of Great Potheridge	Great Potheridge, Merton, Torridge	Garden Wall	1660-70	16 February 1989	SS5139114622; 50°54′43″N 4°06′55″W	1105033	Upload Photo
Church of Holy Trinity	Milton Damerel, Milton Damerel, Torridge	Sundial	1808	14 February 1958	SS3845010717; 50°52′24″N 4°17′51″W	1162778	Church of Holy Trinity More images
Church of St Petrock	Newton St Petrock, Newton St. Petrock, Torridge	Sundial	dated 1723	26 January 1989	SS4113012236; 50°53′16″N 4°15′36″W	1105096	Church of St Petrock More images
Diddywell	Northam, Northam, Torridge	Farmhouse	Formerly	15 June 1951	SS4544329832; 51°02′49″N 4°12′23″W	1306534	Upload Photo
Docton House	Appledore, Northam, Torridge	House	circa late 16th century or early 17th century	15 June 1951	SS4643730350; 51°03′07″N 4°11′32″W	1333011	Upload Photo
Orchard Hill House	Northam, Northam, Torridge	House	late 18th century or early 19th century	19 February 1973	SS4532527644; 51°01′38″N 4°12′25″W	1267190	Upload Photo
Porthill	Northam, Northam, Torridge	House	1760	19 February 1973	SS4480428400; 51°02′02″N 4°12′53″W	1306519	Upload Photo
Richmond Dock	Appledore, Northam, Torridge	Dry Dock	1856	12 February 1987	SS4647130324; 51°03′06″N 4°11′31″W	1140140	Richmond Dock More images
Church of St Pancras	Village Centre, Pancrasweek, Torridge	Anglican Church	1894-8	14 February 1958	SS2968305821; 50°49′37″N 4°25′11″W	1164477	Church of St Pancras More images
Church of St James	Parkham, Torridge	Sundial	1731	20 February 1958	SS3890221509; 50°58′13″N 4°17′45″W	1326557	Church of St James More images
Church of St Petrock	Petrockstowe, Petrockstow, Torridge	Parish Church	Norman	4 October 1960	SS5131909162; 50°51′46″N 4°06′51″W	1333084	Church of St Petrock More images
Little Marland	Petrockstow, Torridge	Farmhouse	Circa 1500-1525	4 October 1960	SS4992311958; 50°53′15″N 4°08′06″W	1104530	Upload Photo
Church of St Swithin	Village Centre, Pyworthy, Torridge	Anglican Church	1885	14 February 1958	SS3129202881; 50°48′03″N 4°23′44″W	1164560	Church of St Swithin More images
Church of Saint Peter	Roborough, Roborough, Torridge	Parish Church	C13/C14	4 October 1960	SS5769217120; 50°56′09″N 4°01′36″W	1326612	Church of Saint Peter More images
Coombe Barton and Adjoining Front Garden Walls	Coombe Barton, Roborough, Torridge	Farmhouse	Late C16/Early 17th century	16 January 1952	SS5673417983; 50°56′36″N 4°02′26″W	1105040	Upload Photo
Ebberly House	Ebberly, Roborough, Torridge	House	Before c1816	16 January 1952	SS5647318549; 50°56′54″N 4°02′40″W	1105001	Ebberly House More images
Great Barlington Farmhouse and Adjoining Front Garden Walls	Great Barlington, Roborough, Torridge	Farmhouse	Early 18th century	16 February 1989	SS5667316459; 50°55′47″N 4°02′27″W	1326611	Upload Photo
Church of St Michael	Shebbear, Shebbear, Torridge	Parish Church	Norman	4 October 1960	SS4384509228; 50°51′41″N 4°13′13″W	1309558	Church of St Michael More images
Church of St Lawrence	Sheepwash, Sheepwash, Torridge	Parish Church	earlier building	4 October 1960	SS4869606328; 50°50′12″N 4°09′00″W	1104503	Church of St Lawrence More images
The Library	Stevenstone Park, St. Giles in the Wood, Torridge	Library	Late C17-Early 18th century	4 October 1960	SS5268419337; 50°57′16″N 4°05′56″W	1104996	The Library More images
The Orangery	Stevenstone Park, St. Giles in the Wood, Torridge	Orangery	c. 1720	4 October 1960	SS5269619380; 50°57′18″N 4°05′55″W	1168092	The Orangery More images
Church of St Giles	St Giles on the Heath, St. Giles on the Heath, Torridge	Parish Church	13th century	23 August 1957	SX3536790756; 50°41′35″N 4°19′56″W	1333042	Church of St Giles More images
Nether Bridge	St. Giles on the Heath, Torridge	Milestone	Medieval	9 January 1986	SX3485686736; 50°39′25″N 4°20′16″W	1104690	Upload Photo
Church of St Andrew	Sutcombe, Sutcombe, Torridge	Obelisk	1742	14 February 1958	SS3469711666; 50°52′51″N 4°21′04″W	1326580	Church of St Andrew More images
Manor Cottage Tetcott Barton Tetcott Manor	Tetcott, Tetcott, Torridge	Cross Passage House	16th century	4 December 1951	SX3315896575; 50°44′41″N 4°21′58″W	1262341	Upload Photo
Church of St Peter	Thornbury, Thornbury, Torridge	Parish Church	Norman origins	14 February 1958	SS4006208455; 50°51′12″N 4°16′25″W	1162910	Church of St Peter More images
Church of St Nectan	Welcombe, Welcombe, Torridge	Anglican Church	1508	20 February 1958	SS2281018434; 50°56′17″N 4°31′24″W	1333126	Church of St Nectan More images
Cory Manor	Village Centre, West Putford, Torridge	Manor House	Late C16-Early 17th century	14 February 1958	SS3598715752; 50°55′04″N 4°20′05″W	1104954	Upload Photo
Lower Bransgrove	Winkleigh, Torridge	Farmhouse	Probably 14th century	18 June 1991	SS6580010770; 50°52′51″N 3°54′32″W	1104575	Upload Photo
Parish Church of St Andrew	Yarnscombe, Yarnscombe, Torridge	Parish Church	13th century	4 October 1960	SS5616323600; 50°59′38″N 4°03′04″W	1104961	Parish Church of St Andrew More images
Lightkeeper's House Old Lighthouse	Torridge	Lighthouse	1787	7 October 1991	SS1320444290; 51°10′02″N 4°40′23″W	1326646	Lightkeeper's House Old Lighthouse More images
Marisco Castle, Keep and Bailey Walls	Torridge	Bailey	1243	7 October 1991	SS1414643772; 51°09′47″N 4°39′34″W	1104957	Marisco Castle, Keep and Bailey Walls More images
