= Deanery of Torrington =

The Deanery of Torrington is part of the Archdeaconry of Barnstaple, one of the four archdeaconries in the Diocese of Exeter.

== Parishes of the Torrington Deanery ==
The parishes of the Torrington Deanery are:

- Ashreigney
- Atherington, Devon
- Beaford
- Broadwoodkelly
- Brushford, Devon
- Buckland Filleigh
- Dolton, Devon
- Dowland, Devon
- Frithelstock
- Great Torrington St Michael and All Angels, Great Torrington
- High Bickington
- Horwood, Devon
- Huish, Torridge
- Iddesleigh Church of St James, Iddesleigh
- Langtree
- Little Torrington
- Merton, Devon
- Monkokehampton
- Newton St Petrock
- Newton Tracey with Alverdiscott
- Peters Marland
- Petrockstowe
- Roborough, Torridge
- Shebbear
- Sheepwash, Devon
- St Giles in the Wood Parish church of St Giles, St Giles in the Wood
- Tawstock
- Winkleigh
- Yarnscombe
