= Shebbear Hundred =

Ancient administrative unit of Devon, England

Shebbear Hundred was the name of one of the thirty-two 19th century hundreds of Devon, England.

The hundred of Shebbear was organized by the 13th century with many of the parishes of the ancient Domesday hundred of Merton.

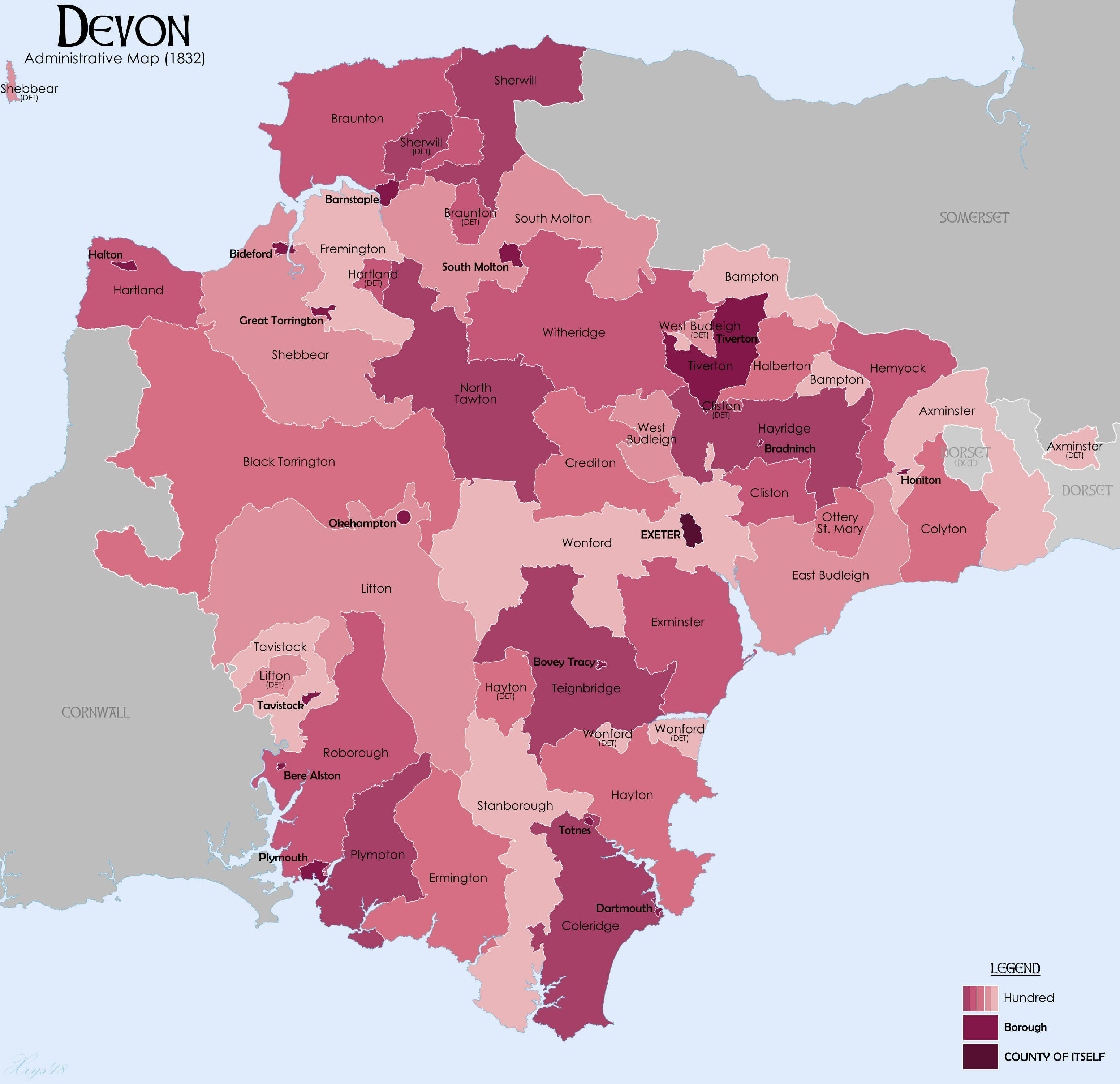
Devon 1832 map with Hundred subdivision

The civil parishes in the hundred of Shebbear were: Abbotsham, Alwington, Beaford, Bideford, Buckland Brewer, Buckland Filleigh, Bulkworthy, East Putford, Frithelstock, Huish, Iddesleigh, Landcross, Langtree, Little Torrington, Littleham (near Bideford), Meeth, Merton, Monkleigh, Newton St Petrock, Northam, Parkham, Peters Marland, Petrockstowe, Shebbear, Sheepwash and Weare Giffard

The island of Lundy, in the northwest of the county, also belongs to Shebbear Hundred, but it is not a civil parish as it formerly was, but an unparished area.

== See also ==
- List of hundreds of England and Wales - Devon

== Literature ==
- Enumeration Abstract (1833), p. 132 (with statistical data of the parishes)]
