= Newton St Petrock =

Village in United Kingdom

- Parish
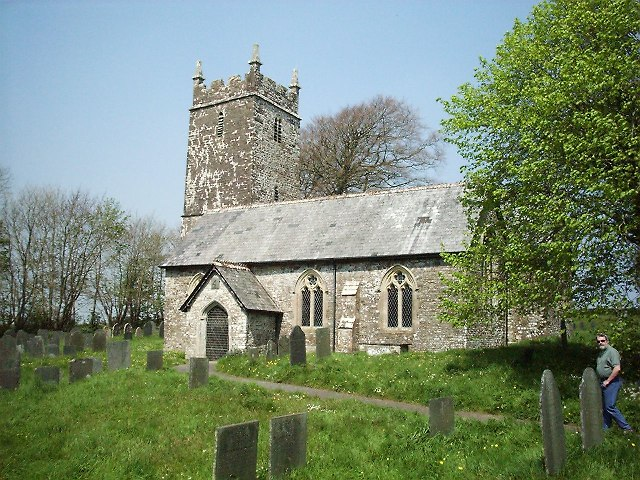
- Newton St Petrock Church

- Location within Devon Location within the United Kingdom
- Coordinates: 50.906°N 4.252°W
- Country: England
- County: Devon
- District: Torridge

Area
  - Total: 610 ha (1,500 acres)

Population (2001)
  - Total: 163
  - Density: 27/km^{2} (70/sq mi)
- Time zone: UTC+0:00 (GST)

Newton St Petrock is an ecclesiastical and civil parish in the Torridge district of Devon in England, occupying approximately 1,500 acres (6.1 km^{2}). The parish had a population in 2001 of 163.

A mile to the east of the village are the earthwork remains of Durpley Castle, a medieval motte-and-bailey castle.

== Overview ==
The parish's landmark is an ancient oak. Its map profile is, appropriately, that of an acorn. Its western border follows the River Torridge. It is contiguous with the parishes of Abbots Bickington, Bulkworthy, Shebbear and Milton Damerel. King Athelstan, in the 10th century, granted the lands of "Niwantun" to the priests of St Petroc's minster at Bodmin. The boundaries of St Petroc's Niwantun remain the same today except for some expansion to the ecclesiastical and civil parish on its north side to include part of what was called Cleave in the Middle Ages, and what was once a detached part of the parish of Frithelstock in the 19th century. The population of this rural parish has remained stable over the last two centuries. In 1801, the population was 201 and this had fallen to 163 by 2001.

In the late 17th century Newton St Petrock was the home of England's first female physician, Prudence Abbott Potter. A 19th-century rector, John Lemprière, wrote a Classical Dictionary used for generations in schools throughout the English-speaking world.

A Baptist chapel was opened at Bullator on 19 January 1830 on the property of Mr Frank Thorne, the local blacksmith, who might be considered the first pastor although the cause began twelve years earlier when the Rev. John Gould retired from Croyde and settled in the parish.

Like many North Devon parishes, Newton St Petrock's numerous sons and daughters emigrated to urban centres, to industrial sites in South Wales, to Canada and elsewhere in the second half of the 19th century.
