= Shebbear (disambiguation) =

Shebbear, a village and civil parish in Devon, England.

Shebbear may also refer to:

- Shebbear Hundred, a former administrative diversion in Devon, England
- Shebbear College, an independent school in Devon, England
- Terowie, South Australia, previously named Shebbear
