= West Putford =

Village and civil parish in Devon, England

Coordinates: 50°55′N 4°19′W

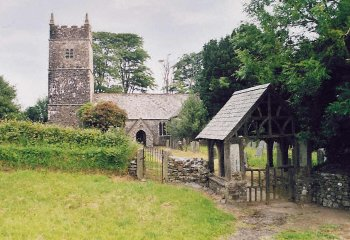
- West Putford parish church

- Location within Devon
- Population: 181 (2001 census)
- Civil parish: West Putford
- District: Torridge
- Shire county: Devon
- Region: South West
- Country: England
- Sovereign state: United Kingdom

West Putford is a small settlement and civil parish in the local government district of Torridge, Devon, England. The parish, which lies about 8.5 miles (13.7 km) north of the town of Holsworthy, is surrounded clockwise from the north by the parishes of East Putford (with which it is joined for ecclesiastical purposes), a small part of Bulkworthy, Abbots Bickington, Sutcombe, Bradworthy and Woolfardisworthy. In 2001 its population was 181, compared to 216 in 1901. The eastern and northern boundaries of the parish mostly follow the River Torridge over which is the 13th-century Kismeldon Bridge. Tumuli on the high ground provide evidence for early inhabitants here.

The cruciform early 14th-century parish church is dedicated to Saint Stephen. It has a Norman font, and the tower has been dated to around 1500. According to W. G. Hoskins (writing in the early 1950s) the church is clean, well-preserved and it largely avoided the attention of the Victorian restorers, making it "a pleasure, not merely to the antiquary, but to all who see it".

Other notable buildings in the parish include Churston House, near the church, which was built in around 1600 by one of the Prideaux family and retains many original features; and Cory Barton, about half a mile to the north, which dates from the 16th century and was the seat of the Cory family. There is a Gnome Reserve, founded in 1979.
