= Virginstow =

Village in Devon, England

Coordinates: 50.716667°N 4.283333°W

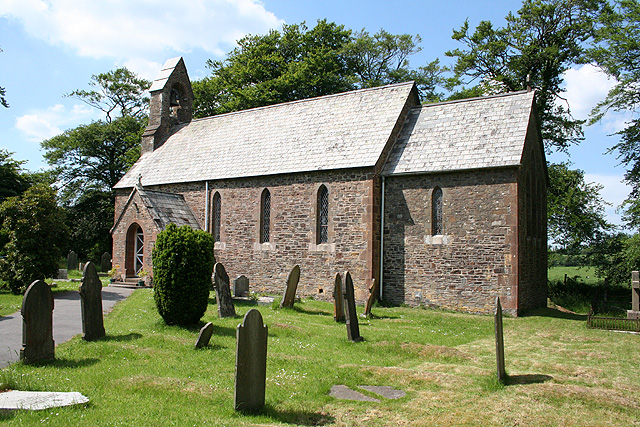
- St Bridget the Virgin

- Location within Devon
- OS grid reference: SX3882993332
- Shire county: Devon
- Region: South West
- Country: England
- Sovereign state: United Kingdom
- Post town: Beaworthy
- Postcode district: EX21
- Police: Devon and Cornwall
- Fire: Devon and Somerset
- Ambulance: South Western
- UK Parliament: Torridge and Tavistock

Virginstow is a village and civil parish in the Torridge district of Devon, England. It is situated about 7 miles north of Launceston in Cornwall. According to the 2001 census, it had a population of 115.
