= Shebbear =

Village in Devon, England

Coordinates: 50°51′N 4°13′W

- Location within Devon
- Population: 1,021 (2021 census)
- Civil parish: Shebbear
- District: Torridge
- Shire county: Devon
- Region: South West
- Country: England
- Sovereign state: United Kingdom
- Post town: Beaworthy
- Postcode district: EX21
- UK Parliament: Torridge and Tavistock

Shebbear (/ˈʃɛbɪər/; SHEB-eer) is a village and civil parish in the Torridge district in Devon, England.

== History ==
Shebbear was the third-largest settlement recorded in North Devon in the Domesday Book, having 76 households, 20 of which were slaves. It was unusual in having no Lord, rather being owned directly by the King. Its pre-conquest Saxon name Sceftbeara (Spear-shaft Wood) gives a clue to its historical importance.

It was later centre of Shebbear Hundred, a historic administrative area comprising the land surrounded on three sides by the River Torridge and the island of Lundy.

An electoral ward exists titled Shebbear & Langtree. The 2021 census population of the parish was 1,021. The village shares its name with the Shebbeare family, who owned land in the area, and of which 18th-century political satirist John Shebbeare was a member.

== Religion ==
The church of St Michael and All Angels is the Church of England parish church in the centre of the village. The nave and chancel date back to the 12th century. The south doorway is from about 1180 and is of Norman origin; similar doorways exist in Buckland Brewer, Parkham and Woolfardisworthy.

William O’Bryan founded the Bible Christian Church in Shebbear in 1815. The first Bryanite chapel, Lake chapel, was built in the village in 1817. The Bryanites also founded Shebbear College. A symbolic act of reconciliation was held in 2009 between the Methodist and Anglican communities in Shebbear, after the founding of the Bible Christian Church caused an almost 200 year long religious split.

According to the 2021 census, 53.4% of residents are Christian, and 45% report following no religion. 0.3% of residents are Muslim and 0.4% are Buddhist.

== Devil's Stone ==
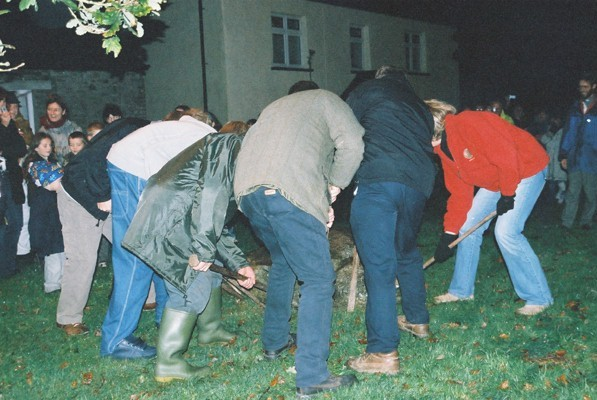
Turning the Devil's Stone, 2005

The Devil's Stone is a large boulder that lies on the village green outside St Michael's Church. At 8 pm on 5 November each year, residents gather outside the church to watch the village bellringers turn the Devil's Stone. This takes place instead of traditional bonfire night celebrations. Local legend states that the stone was dropped on the Devil during a battle with archangel Michael. Consequently, the stone fell on top of him, flattening him under it. The folklore reasoning for the turning is that it takes a year for the Devil to dig down and up the other side of the rock, at which point it is flipped again, re-trapping him; if the stone is not turned every year disaster will fall on the village. As apparent evidence of this, the stone was not turned on 5 November one year during the Second World War (either due to blackout measures or to most able-bodied men being enlisted), and after a few days of bad news befalling the village a decision was made to turn the stone anyway.

Various alternative versions of the story exist, including that the Devil dropped the stone on the way to the nearby village of Northlew, or that it was an original foundation stone for Henscott church which moved across the River Torridge by supernatural means.

The village pub, The Devil's Stone Inn, is named after the stone. The inn is said to be haunted.

The stone is a conglomerate boulder and is not of local origin, and has been claimed to be a glacial erratic boulder despite the area not being glaciated in the Last Glacial Period.

== Education ==
Shebbear has three schools: Shebbear Community School, a state primary school for children from 4 to 11 years of age; Little Bears preschool, which lies within the grounds of the community school; and Shebbear College, a private school for children from 3 to 18 years of age.

== Notable people ==
- Ernest Walter Martin, writer and social historian (born in Shebbear, 1912)
- John D. Prior, trade unionist (born in Shebbear, 10 March 1840)
- William Strong Hore, clergyman and botanist (vicar of Shebbear, 1855 to 1882)
- James Thorne, leader of the Bible Christian Church (born in Shebbear, 1795)
- Graeme Ackland, physicist, Shebbear primary school and college pupil.

== Twin towns ==
Shebbear is twinned with Balleroy, France.
