= Landcross =

Landcross may refer to:

- Landcross, Devon, a village in England
- Landcross, the combined form of the Multiforce team, in the fictional universe of the Transformers
- Landcros, a Japanese construction equipment manufacturer
