= East Putford =

Village in Devon, England

Coordinates: 50°56′N 4°19′W

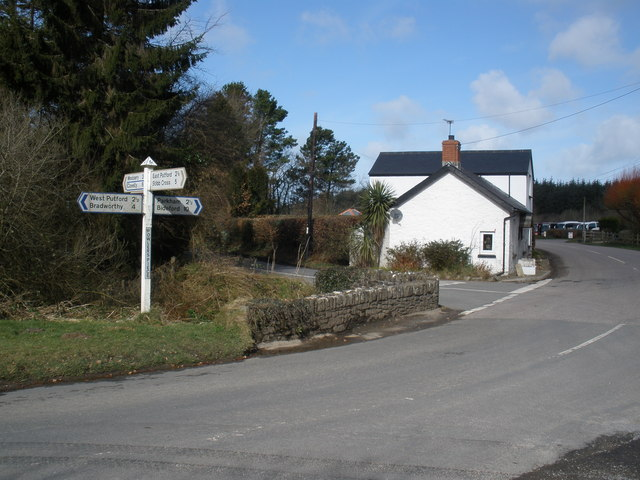
- Powler's Piece, a crossroads hamlet in the north of the parish

- Location within Devon
- Population: 103 (2001 census)
- Civil parish: East Putford
- District: Torridge
- Shire county: Devon
- Region: South West
- Country: England
- Sovereign state: United Kingdom

East Putford is a small settlement and civil parish in the local government district of Torridge, Devon, England. The parish, which lies about halfway between the towns of Holsworthy and Bideford, is surrounded clockwise from the north by the parishes of Parkham, Buckland Brewer, Bulkworthy, West Putford, and Woolfardisworthy. In 2001 its population was 103, slightly lower than the 125 residents it had in 1901.

The western boundary of the parish is formed by the River Torridge and the land rises from the river to over 200 m. near the top of Melbury Hill in the north. Tumuli on the high ground provide evidence for early inhabitants here. The parish church, dedicated to St Philip and St James the Less, was extensively restored in 1882, but has since been deconsecrated and used as a farm building, though by 2004 both the building and its churchyard were overgrown.

Two farmhouses in the parish are of interest. Mambury was a freehold estate from its origin in the 12th century, and Winslade, near the top of Melbury Hill, was the home of John Wynslade who was executed for his part in the Prayer Book Rebellion of 1549.
