= Parkham =

Village in Devon, England

Coordinates: 50.96°N 04.30°W

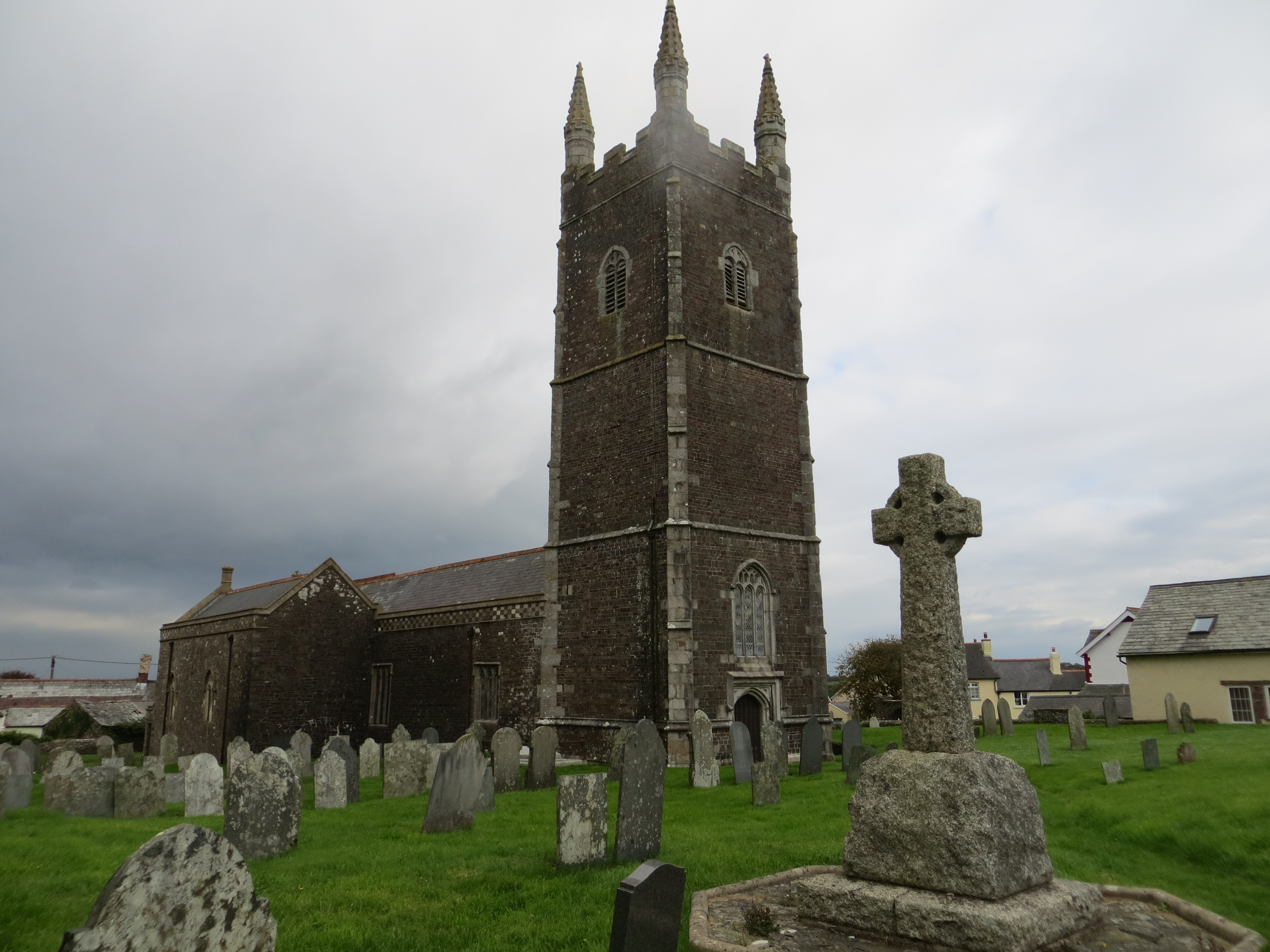
- St James church

- Location within Devon
- OS grid reference: SS3821
- District: Torridge
- Shire county: Devon
- Region: South West
- Country: England
- Sovereign state: United Kingdom
- Post town: Bideford
- Postcode district: EX39
- Dialling code: 01237
- Police: Devon and Cornwall
- Fire: Devon and Somerset
- Ambulance: South Western
- UK Parliament: Torridge and Tavistock

Parkham is a small village, civil parish and former manor situated five miles southwest of the town of Bideford in north Devon, England. The parish, which lies within the Kenwith ward in the Torridge district, is surrounded clockwise from the north by the parishes of Alwington, Littleham, Buckland Brewer, East Putford and Woolfardisworthy. In 2001 its population was 742, compared to 786 in 1901.

The large parish church, dedicated to St James, is mostly 15th century, though it still has a Norman doorway and font. It was restored by R. W. Drew in 1875.

Although there is a substantial farming community around Parkham, the majority of incomes are earned outside of the village. During the summer months tourism contributes to the economy through a number of guest houses in the area. In the centre of the village is a public house, The Bell Inn, that was refurbished in 2018 after a fire. There is also a butcher, G E Honey & Son. There is a Youth Club every Thursday in the Methodist chapel and every second Friday of the month in the village hall. Parkham has a primary school which is now federated with Buckland Brewer primary school and have around 90 pupils between them.

As of 2019, one bus route serves Parkham, the 372 Bradworthy – Barnstaple operated by Stagecoach, with 1–2 buses in each direction Monday to Friday.

== Historic estates ==
The following historic estates are within the parish:

- Halsbury, today a farmhouse called Halsbury Barton, long a seat of the ancient Giffard family.
- Bableigh, seat of the Risdon family from the 13th to 18th centuries.
