= Sutcombe =

Village and civil parish in Devon, England

Coordinates: 50°53′N 4°21′W

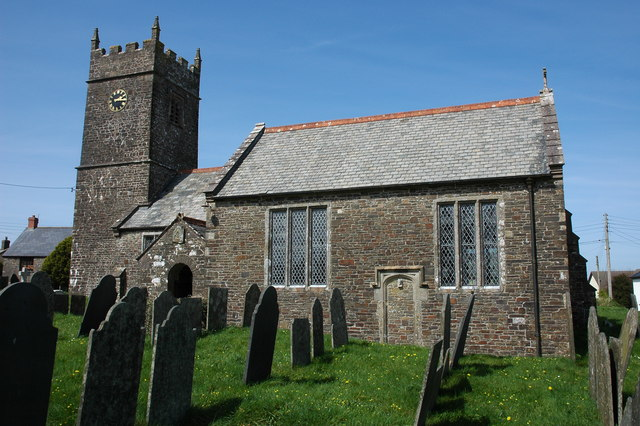
- Sutcombe parish church

- Location within Devon
- Population: 299 (2001 census)
- Civil parish: Sutcombe
- District: Torridge
- Shire county: Devon
- Region: South West
- Country: England
- Sovereign state: United Kingdom

Sutcombe is a village and civil parish in the local government district of Torridge, Devon, England. The parish, which lies about 5.5 miles north of the town of Holsworthy, is surrounded clockwise from the north by the parishes of West Putford, Abbots Bickington, Milton Damerel, Holsworthy Hamlets and Bradworthy. In 2001 its population was 299, compared to 351 in 1901.

== Church of St Andrew ==
The parish church in the village is dedicated to Saint Andrew. Although it has a 12th-century south doorway it mostly dates from the late 15th and early 16th centuries, having some ornate 16th-century bench ends and late medieval floor-tiles from Barnstaple. It was restored by Bodley & Garner in 1876.

== War Memorial ==
A Latin cross memorial on a four stepped plinth commemorating the residents of Sutcombe who were killed or missing in The Great War 1914- 1918 and World War 1939-1945.

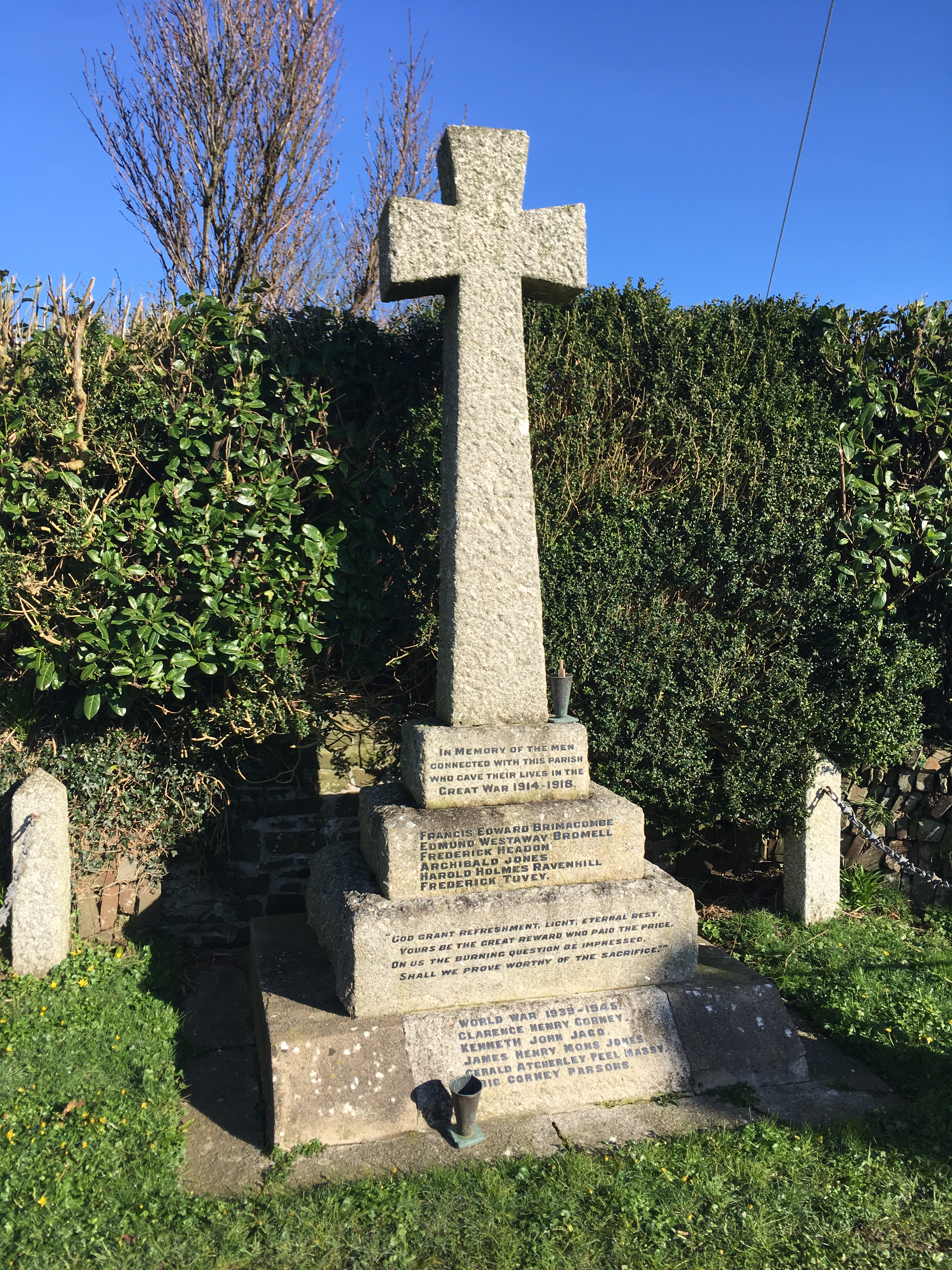
Sutcombe War Memorial

Plinth 4 Inscription

"IN MEMORY OF THE MEN CONNECTED WITH THIS PARISH WHO GAVE THEIR LIVES IN THE GREAT WAR 1914-1918."

Plinth 3 Inscription

"(Names)"

Plinth 2 Inscription

"GOD GRANT REFRESHMENT LIGHT ETERNAL REST YOURS BE THE GREAT REWARD WHO PAID THE PRICE. ON US THE BURNING QUESTION BE IMPRESSED SHALL WE PROVE WORTHY OF THE SACRIFICE"

Plinth 1 Inscription

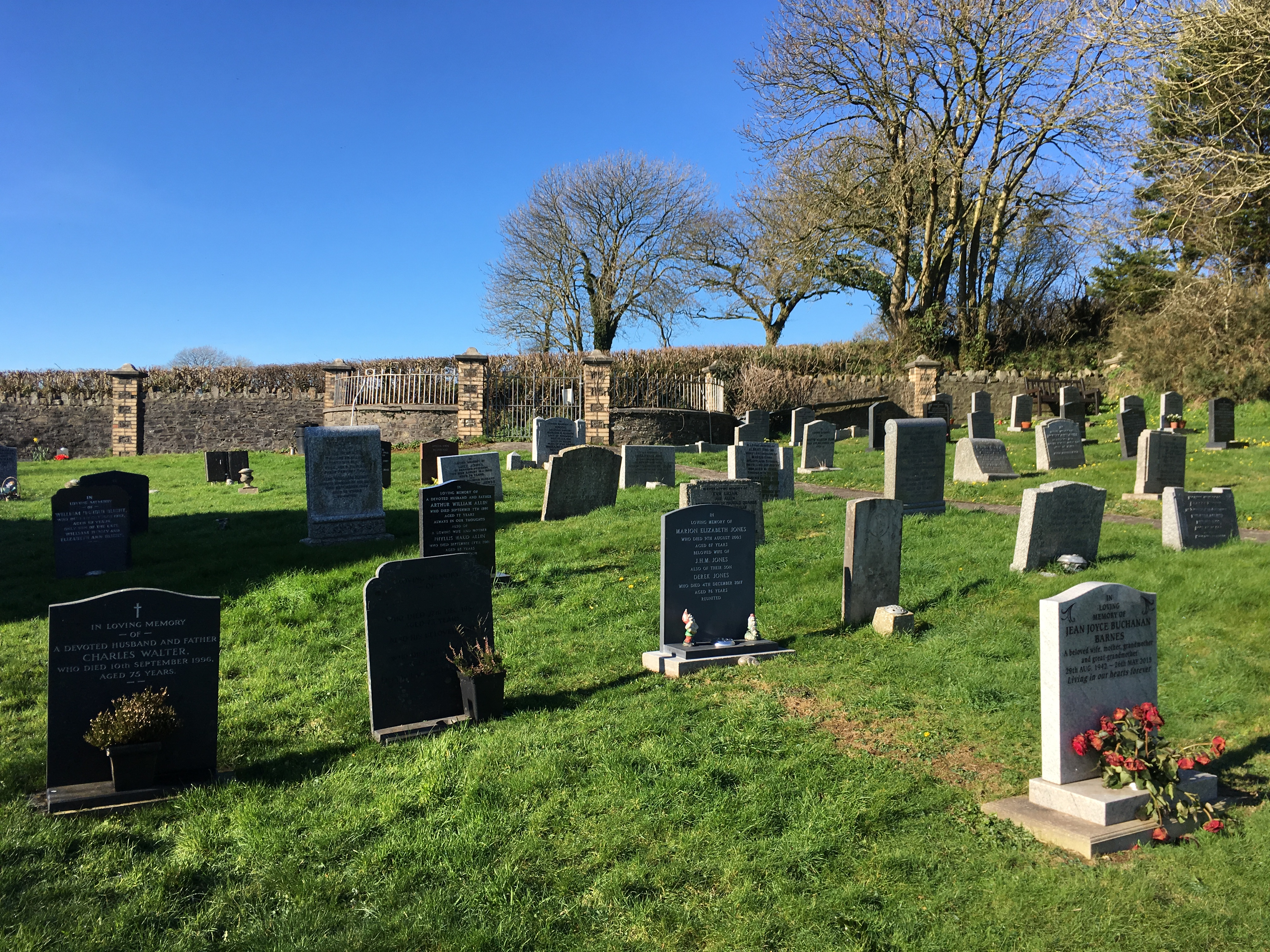
Sutcombe Free Church Cemetery

"WORLD WAR 1939 - 1945 (Names)"

== Free Church Cemetery ==
Maintained by donations and an annual grant from the Parish Council is Sutcombe Free Church Cemetery.

== Historic estates ==
=== Thuborough ===
Thuborough in the south of the parish is now a farmhouse, but it was an estate mentioned in the Domesday Book of 1086. From about 1500 it belonged to a branch of the Prideaux family and was their seat during the 16th and 17th centuries. The house retains details from this period.
