= Roborough, Torridge =

Village in Devon, England

Coordinates: 50.935715°N 4.027534°W

Roborough
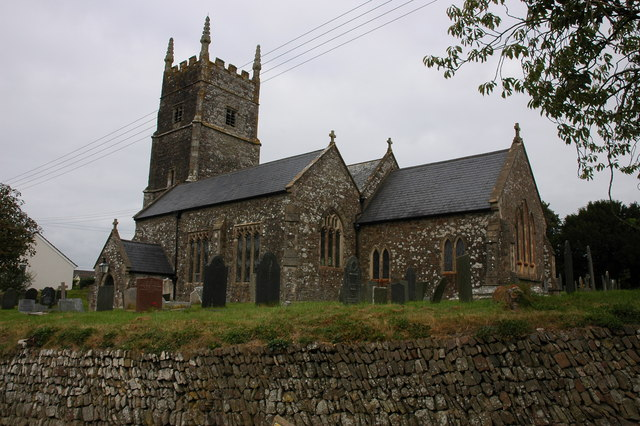
- Roborough Church

- Location within Devon
- OS grid reference: SS 576 170
- Civil parish: Roborough
- District: Torridge
- Shire county: Devon
- Region: South West
- Country: England
- Sovereign state: United Kingdom
- Post town: Winkleigh
- Postcode district: EX19
- Dialling code: 01805
- Police: Devon and Cornwall
- Fire: Devon and Somerset
- Ambulance: South Western
- UK Parliament: Torridge and Tavistock

Roborough is a village and civil parish 5.5 mi (8.9 km) from Great Torrington, in Devon, England. Situated topographically on the plateau between the Torridge and Taw Rivers, the parish covers 1,258 ha (3,110 acres) and contains a population of some 258 parishioners. It is surrounded by a pastoral landscape of rectangular fields, high hedges and scattered farmsteads.

== Historic estates ==
Various historic estates are situated within the parish of Roborough, including:

=== Owlacombe ===
The estate of OLECU(M)BE is listed in the Domesday Book of 1086 as the 7th of the 27 Devonshire holdings of Theobald FitzBerner (fl.1086), an Anglo-Norman warrior and magnate, one of the Devon Domesday Book tenants-in-chief of King William the Conqueror. His tenant was Gotshelm. The mansion house survives today as "Owlacombe", south-west of the village of Roborough.

=== Combe / Over Wollocombe ===
Much confusion exists in historical sources concerning the estates of Over Wollocombe and Combe, which appear to refer to the same place. Over Wollocombe, a seat of the Wollocombe family, was stated by Pole (d.1635) to have been situated in the parish of Roborough:

"Over Wollacombe, in the parish of Rowburgh, hath had of the name of Wollacomb his owner many generacions & doth contynewe it unto this day".

Certainly in the 16th, 17th and 18th centuries many members of the Wollocombe family "of Combe" were baptised, married and buried at Roborough. The family became extinct in the male line on the death of Roger Wollocombe (1632–1704), buried at Roborough, who left two or three surviving daughters as his co-heiresses. The 5th-born daughter Mary Wollocombe (1666–1701) married John Stafford (1674–1721) of Stafford Barton in the nearby parish of Dolton, whose eldest son Roger Stafford (1696–1732) assumed the surname Wollocombe in lieu of his patronymic, following the death of his uncle Roger Wollocombe (1632–1704). He died without surviving male progeny, when his heir became his younger brother Thomas Stafford (1697–1756), who likewise assumed the surname Wollocombe and was buried at Roborough. He married a daughter of the prominent Rolle family. His sons adopted the surname Stafford-Wollocombe. His daughter Henrietta Stafford (born 1732) married Henry Hole of Ebberly, in the parish of Roborough. Her son Thomas Hole in 1819 was resident at Stafford Barton. The Stafford-Wollocombe family later moved to Bidlake in the parish of Bridestowe, having inherited that estate by marriage. "Combe Barton" in Roborough survives today as a Tudor house, which contains in the hall a "large heraldic late Tudor (or early c.17) plaster overmantel" displaying within a strapwork cartouche the arms of Wollocombe "with two figures and two fronds" below.

Risdon (d.1640) however stated Over Wollocombe to have been in the parish of Mortehoe, about 18 miles north-west of Roborough, the modern beach-resort of Woolacombe. According to Risdon this estate in the parish of Mortehoe was the original home of the Wollocombe family, which later moved to "Combe" in the parish of Roborough, which it inherited following the marriage of Thomas Wollocombe to Elizabeth Barry, daughter and heiress of Henry At-Combe (alias Barry, a younger son of the Barry family, lords of the manor of Roborough, who "was called after the name of this house") Risdon calls the Wollocombe seat in the parish of Roborough simply "Combe".

=== Ebberly ===
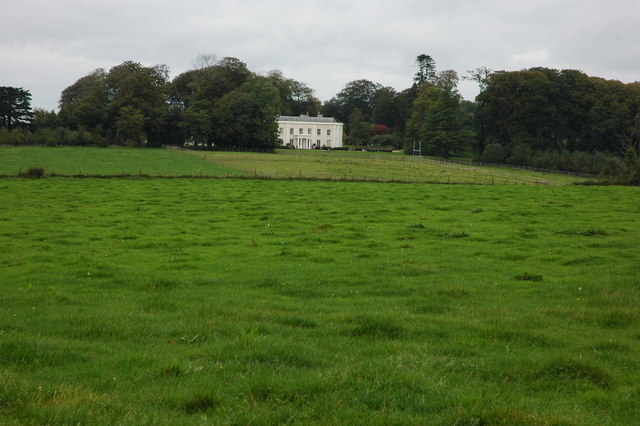
Ebberly House, viewed from south

Ebberly is a hamlet within Roborough parish. The hamlet has several prominent white houses by the roadside, including Ebberley Hill Barton (formerly a coaching inn called Ebberley Arms and now operating as Ebberley Escapes Bed and Breakfast), a mansion house known as Ebberly House and a Methodist chapel.

The estate of Ebberley is first recorded, as Emberlegh, in the 13th century Book of Fees. In the mediaeval era it was the seat of the de Ebberleigh family which had taken its surname from its seat. During the reign of King Henry VI (1422–1461) following the death of Walter de Ebberleigh with no surviving son, the estate passed to Roger Davy (alias Dewy) who had married Walter's daughter and heiress Thomasine de Ebberleigh. The Davy family remained seated at Ebberly until after 1620.

William Davie of Ebberleigh was a Member of Parliament for Barnstaple in 1446. His son Richard Davie had two sons, William the elder, who continued at Ebberleigh, and Robert Davie, who settled at Crediton and became a wealthy clothier and was the ancestor of the Davie family of Creedy.

The estate was inherited by Henry Hole from his uncle (the Hole family resided at Combe, Roborough). Henry Hole was a builder and wood-engraver from Liverpool who in about 1816 rebuilt the mansion house, possibly incorporating some elements of the former building; the architect may have been Thomas Lee. Ebberly House was classified as a grade II* listed building in 1952. In 2010 the estate comprising six cottages, farmland and farm buildings, produced an annual income of £50,000.
