= Dolton, Devon =

Village in Devon, England

Coordinates: 50°53′30″N 4°01′52″W

Dolton
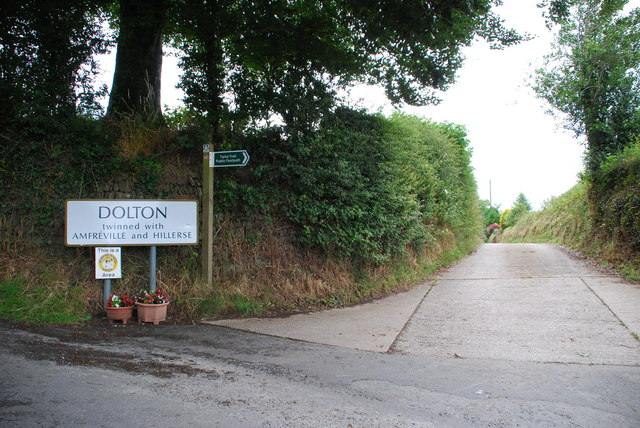
- Dolton Lane leading to Cleave Farm

- Location within Devon
- Population: 683 (2021 census)
- Civil parish: Dolton
- District: Torridge
- Shire county: Devon
- Region: South West
- Country: England
- Sovereign state: United Kingdom
- Post town: WINKLEIGH
- Postcode district: EX19
- Dialling code: 01805
- UK Parliament: Torridge and Tavistock

Dolton is a small village and civil parish in the Torridge district of Devon, south-west England, surrounded, clockwise from the north, by Beaford, Ashreigney, Winkleigh, Dowland, Meeth, Huish and Merton. It has a population of around 900.

Dolton appears in the Domesday Book of 1086 as Duueltone. The name may mean "farmstead in the open country frequented by doves" (Old English dūfe + feld + tūn).

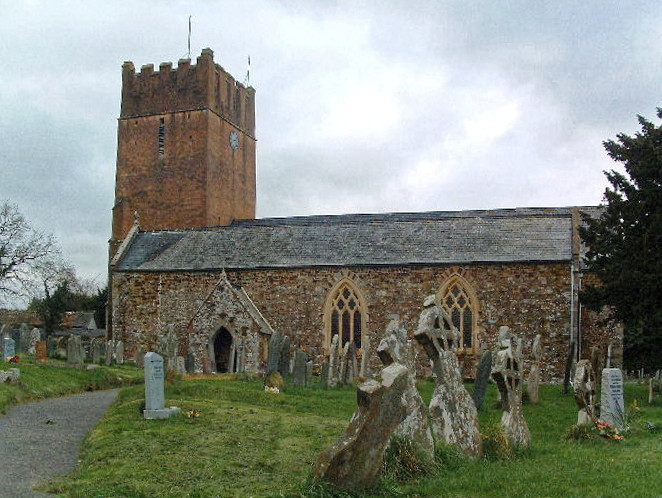
St Edmund's Church, Dolton

The Tarka Trail passes by Dolton. The parish church is dedicated to St Edmund. The historic stately home Stafford Barton is close by. Dolton is twinned with Amfreville in France, and Hillerse in Germany.

Anthony Horneck FRS, the Protestant theologian, lived in Dolton between 1670 and 1671. Henry Bentinck, 11th Earl of Portland, lived at a house called Little Cudworthy and died there in 1997. Rolling Stones drummer Charlie Watts lived at Halsdon House near the village for some years until his death in 2021.
