= High Bickington =

Village in Devon, England

Coordinates: 50.9703°N 3.9963°W

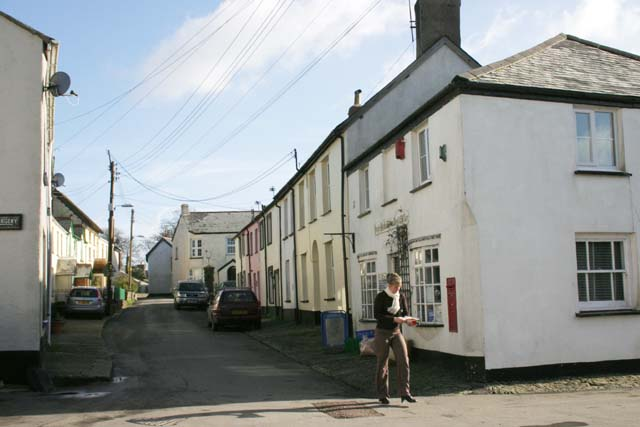
- High Bickington High Street and Post Office

- Location within Devon
- Population: 837 (2011)
- OS grid reference: SS598209
- Civil parish: High Bickington
- District: Torridge
- Shire county: Devon
- Region: South West
- Country: England
- Sovereign state: United Kingdom
- Post town: UMBERLEIGH
- Postcode district: EX37
- Dialling code: 01769
- Police: Devon and Cornwall
- Fire: Devon and Somerset
- Ambulance: South Western
- UK Parliament: Torridge and Tavistock

High Bickington is a rural village and civil parish in the Torridge district of Devon, England. The village lies on the B3217 road, around 6 miles (10 km) east of Great Torrington, 8 miles (13 km) south-west of South Molton, and 8 miles (13 km) south of Barnstaple. At the 2011 Census, the parish had a population of 837.

The village is on a slight ridge near the valley of the River Taw, at an elevation of around 160 metres (520 ft), among largely cultivated hills and woods. The ridge has unbroken views across the valley towards Exmoor.

High Bickington is one of four settlements in Devon with "Bickington" in its name: the others are the village of Bickington near Newton Abbot, the hamlet of Bickington west of Barnstaple, and Abbots Bickington near Holsworthy.

== History ==
With its origins in Saxon times (around 650), or earlier, the manor of High Bickington is referred to as 'Bichentone' in the Domesday Book of 1086. Before the Norman Conquest, the manor belonged to a Saxon nobleman, Britric, nicknamed Meau ('the fair'), who also held rights to the land revenues of Gloucester and extensive estates in the West Country. He spurned the advances of Matilda, the Duke of Flanders' daughter and later the wife of William the Conqueror. She later imprisoned Britric and eventually had him put to death. All his lands passed to her, including Bichentona, Clovelly, Bideford, Winkleigh and Tiverton. The lands were later inherited by Matilda's son, William Rufus, who became William II of England.

William gave Bichentona to Robert Fitzhamon whose daughter was later married to Robert, 1st Earl of Gloucester, illegitimate son of Henry I.

In around 1150 the manor of High Bickington came into the possession of the Champernownes of Umberleigh. Lady Joan Champernowne gave some of the lands to the Lodges family. Hugh de Loges held the manor of Buckington Loges during the reigns of King John and Henry III (1199–1261). This was inherited by William Boyes in 1364, although by this time the lands around the village had been divided between several others including Holt, Clavil, Snape, Stowford, Corpsland, Burvet and Wotton, whose names still survive today in hamlet, farm and field names around the parish.

From about 1400 onwards, owners were selling off parcels of land. The Church manor of Corpsiland, south of the present village high street, and including the property still known as Parsonage, was held by the parson until 1800. The Bassetts of Umberleigh inherited lands from the Champernownes, while the Pyncombes of North Molton acquired large areas around the parish from around 1500 onwards. The last of them, Mrs Gertrude Pyncombe, in her will of 20 January 1730, founded a charitable educational trust from which grants are still made to local children.

The population of the parish/village was given as 17 families, around a hundred people, at the time of the Domesday Book; this rose to a peak of 851 people in 1851. By 1901 it had fallen to 539, and it continued to fall to around 410 in the 1950s. Since then the population has steadily risen as a result of recent development, and now stands near its 1801 level.

== Industry and facilities ==
Agriculture has always been and still is the main industry in the parish. In the past, the village was almost self-sufficient, but in modern times with the advent of the motor car most business now takes place away from the village, in towns such as Barnstaple, Bideford, Torrington and South Molton. The village still has a post office, Community shop, primary school, golf course. Building trades services can be found in and around the village. The village has a football team and various pub-sport teams which play at the Golf Club.

High Bickington is still largely unspoilt and retains much of the character of an isolated rural country village, including many thatched cottages, cobbled pavements and narrow streets.

There is an historic English manor house 3 miles south-west of the village: Northcote Manor, now a hotel.

The nearest stations are Umberleigh and Portsmouth Arms, both about 2.5 miles away by road, and both on the Tarka Line.

== Sports clubs ==
The village has a cricket and football team, the latter of which (High Bickington FC) compete in the North Devon Football league, currently the Intermediate 1 division. The village is now home to a Badminton club as well.
