= Landcross, Devon =

Hamlet and civil parish in Devon, England

Coordinates: 50.9943°N 4.1950°W

Landcross
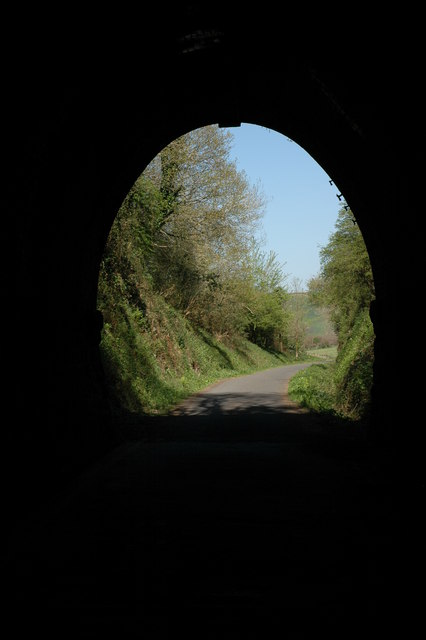
- The Landcross Tunnel on the Tarka Trail

- Location within Devon
- Population: 70 (2001 census)
- Civil parish: Landcross
- District: Torridge
- Shire county: Devon
- Region: South West
- Country: England
- Sovereign state: United Kingdom

Landcross is a hamlet and civil parish in the local government district of Torridge, Devon, England. The parish, which is the smallest in Devon, lies just south of the town of Bideford. It is bordered clockwise from the north by the parishes of Bideford, Weare Giffard, Monkleigh, and Littleham, its eastern border being formed by a meander of the River Torridge and the western by the River Yeo. In 2001 its population was 70, compared to 58 in 1901.

The small parish church, dedicated to the Holy Trinity, has ancient origins; it was rebuilt in 1435 but retains its Norman font. It also contains some finely carved early 16th-century bench-ends. General George Monck, who lived at Great Potheridge in Merton parish to the south, was baptised here in 1608. Its tower was replaced by a turret after it was destroyed by a lightning strike in the 1820s.

Near to Pillmouth on the River Torridge was the entrance to the Rolle Canal, opened in 1827. An extension of the London and South Western Railway between Bideford and Great Torrington was opened in 1872, and the line which ran through the parish now forms part of the Tarka Trail of footpaths and cycle routes.
