= Beaford =

Village and civil parish in Devon, England

- Village
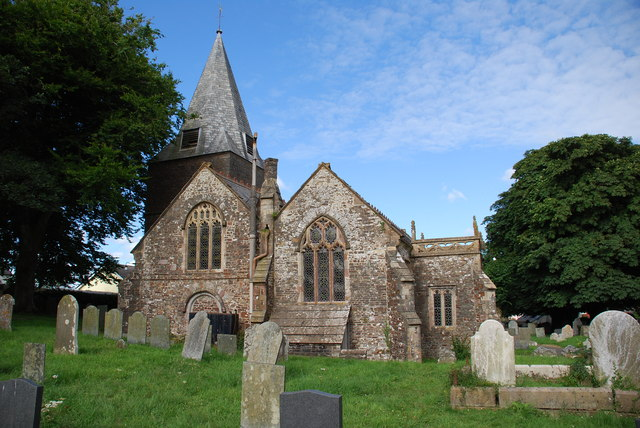
- Beaford parish church

- Location within Devon Location within the United Kingdom
- Coordinates: 50°55′N 4°03′W
- Country: England
- County: Devon
- District: Torridge

Population (2001)
  - Total: 393

Beaford is a village and civil parish in the Torridge district of Devon, England. The village is about five miles south-east of Great Torrington, on the A3124 road towards Exeter. According to the 2001 census the parish had a population of 393, compared to 428 in 1901. The western boundary of the parish is formed by the River Torridge and it is surrounded, clockwise from the north, by the parishes of St Giles in the Wood, Roborough, Ashreigney, Dolton, Merton and Little Torrington.

The parish church, which is in the village, is dedicated to All Saints, though before the Reformation it was dedicated to St George. It has a 15th-century doorway, arches and windows, as well as a Norman font, but according to W. G. Hoskins (writing in 1954) it is otherwise dull, having been heavily restored. Its tower was rebuilt with a small spire in 1910.

Greenwarren House in the village is the former home of Beaford Arts, the country's longest established rural arts centre. It is now a private family house.

Beaford House was host to some of the Great Train Robbers, who are understood to have buried more than £200,000 of the stolen money in nearby woods.

Beaford used to have a cricket team which competed in division 2 of the North Devon League. It has now folded.

== Historic estates ==
Arms of Mallet: Azure, three escallops Or

Within the parish, the estates of Upcott, Warham and Woodleigh (otherwise known as Woolleigh or Wooleigh) were once important.

Woolleigh was the seat of the Mallet family until the death of Robert Mallet. His widow was Elizabeth Rolle (a daughter of the wealthy George Rolle (died 1552) of Stevenstone near Great Torrington) who remarried to Sir John Acland (died 1620) of Columb John. During Elizabeth's lifetime the couple resided at Woolleigh. Sir John Acland's nephew Sir Arthur Acland (died 1610) married Eleanor Mallet, the daughter and heir of Robert Mallet, and thus Wooleigh passed into the Acland family, later of Killerton. The son and heir of Sir Hugh Acland, 5th Baronet (died 1713) was John Acland (died 1703) who lived at Wooleigh whilst his father lived at Killerton. The present farmhouse incorporates part of the mediaeval manor house, a garderobe with its original door and retains remains of a 15th-century family chapel.

== Sources ==
- Vivian, Lt. Col. J. L., (Ed.) The Visitations of the County of Devon, Comprising the Heralds' Visitations of 1531, 1564 & 1620. Exeter, 1895.
