= Bradworthy =

Village in Devon, England

Coordinates: 50.901°N 4.385°W

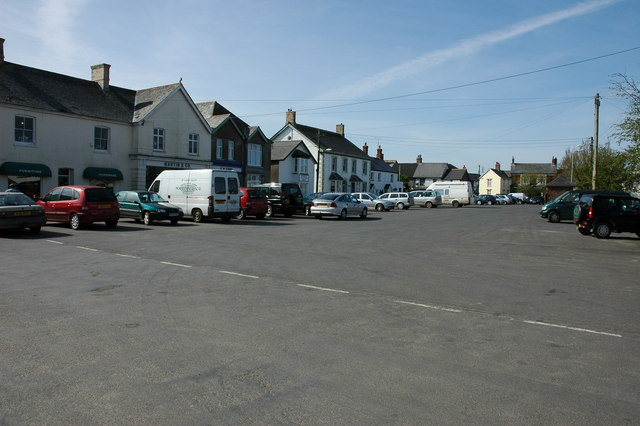
- Village square

- Location within Devon
- Population: 741
- OS grid reference: SS3213
- District: Torridge
- Shire county: Devon
- Region: South West
- Country: England
- Sovereign state: United Kingdom
- Post town: Holsworthy
- Postcode district: EX22
- Dialling code: 01409
- Police: Devon and Cornwall
- Fire: Devon and Somerset
- Ambulance: South Western

Bradworthy is a village and civil parish in Devon, England, situated 3 miles (4.8 km) north-east of the border with Cornwall. This location has led to it being called the "last village in North Devon" – traveling further west leads to the Cornish village of Kilkhampton. The village is close to the site of the first wind turbines in Devon, erected in 2005. Bradworthy has the largest village square in England. The civil parish is bordered by the Devon parishes Hartland, Woolfardisworthy, West Putford, Sutcombe, Holsworthy Hamlets, and Pancrasweek and the Cornish civil parishes Kilkhampton and Morwenstow. As well as a number of shops, Bradworthy village has a pub, a primary school, and an industrial estate.

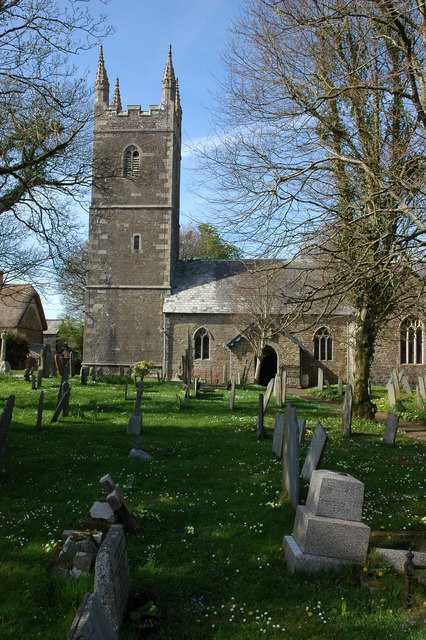
St John the Baptist church

The parish church of St John the Baptist dates from the 13th century and is a grade II* listed building.

Arthur Herbert Procter, a Victoria Cross recipient, was vicar of Bradworthy from 1963 to 1964.

The name Bradworthy comes from the words brad and worþign, meaning "wide estate".

Bradworthy appears in the 1086 Domesday Book as Brawordine. It was held by Ralph of Pomeroy and its assets were: 12 ploughlands, 10 plough teams, 40 acres (16 ha) of meadow, 9 square miles (23 km^{2}) of pasture, 40 cattle, 10 pigs, 120 sheep, 5 goats, and 30 other livestock. It rendered £8.

== Amenities ==
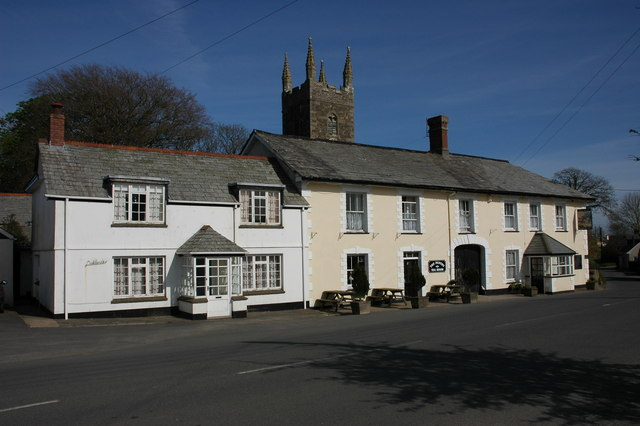
Bradworthy Inn

Bradworthy has a wide range of shops, many of which are situated on the perimeter of the village square, including a general store, a cafe, a pub (The Bradworthy Inn) a butcher's, a vet's, a garage, and two homeware stores. Finally – in addition to being served by a post office – the village has a hairdresser's and a beauty salon.

Bradworthy Primary Academy is the village's government-funded school and pre-school, with 203 children on roll as of Spring 2020. It has seven classrooms, outdoor playgrounds, and a pool.

== Landmarks ==
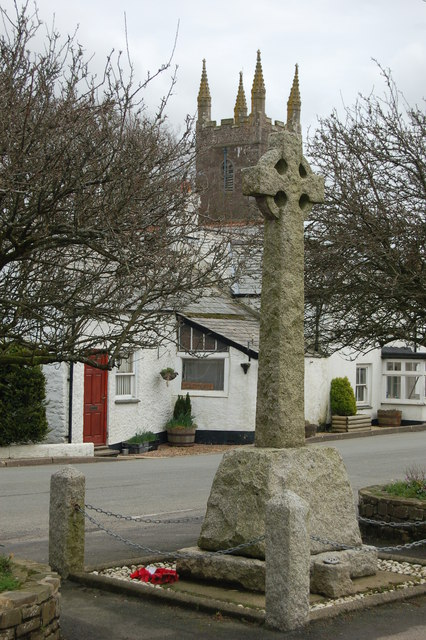
Bradworthy's war memorial

Bradworthy claims to have the largest village square in the West Country. Its tarmacked area, which marks the centre of the village, is enclosed by businesses and houses, and has been present for around 1,000 years. The River Waldon, a tributary of the River Torridge, flows near to the village centre.
