= Graeme Ackland =

Scottish academic

- Born: Graeme John Ackland
- Occupation: Professor of computer simulation at the School of Physics and Astronomy, University of Edinburgh

Graeme John Ackland FRSE is the Professor of Computer Simulation at the University of Edinburgh.

His research concerns quantum mechanical modelling of materials including Density functional theory of metallic hydrogen and other materials under high pressure. He also worked on Radiation material science designing radiation-resistant steels. He has also applied simulations to non-physical problems including Neolithic migration and producing predictions of the spread of COVID-19 for the UK Health Security Agency.

He has also served three times as planner (course setter), for the 2015 World Orienteering Championships in relay and middle distance and 2024 World Orienteering Championships in sprint relay.

Ackland's mother was South African, he is the first physics professor of African origin at University of Edinburgh.
