= Taddiport =

Hamlet in Devon, England

Coordinates: 50.9472°N 4.1534°W

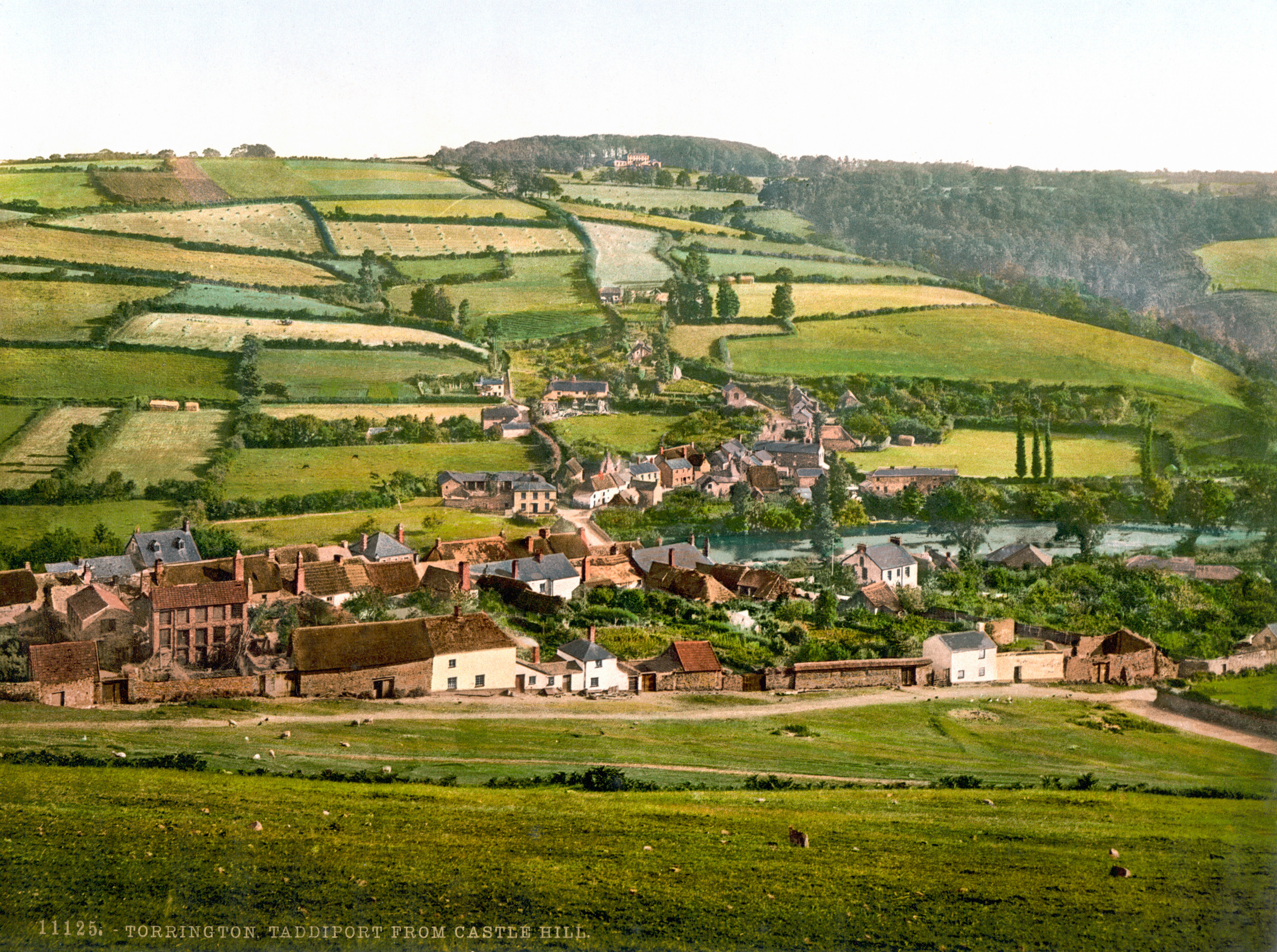
Taddiport viewed from Great Torrington in 1890.

Taddiport is a hamlet in North Devon, England, near Great Torrington. The name is believed to derive from toad, a place where toads were found. In the Middle Ages it was a leper colony. A field system next to the hamlet is still divided up as for the medieval strip system of farming. During the years of operation of the Rolle Canal the canal had a quay across the river Torridge from Taddiport. Taddiport appears on the early 15th century Evesham world map; its inclusion has led many to believe that the map-maker hailed from the small hamlet.
