= Dowland, Devon =

Hamlet in Devon, England

Coordinates: 50.8746°N 4.03566225°W

Dowland
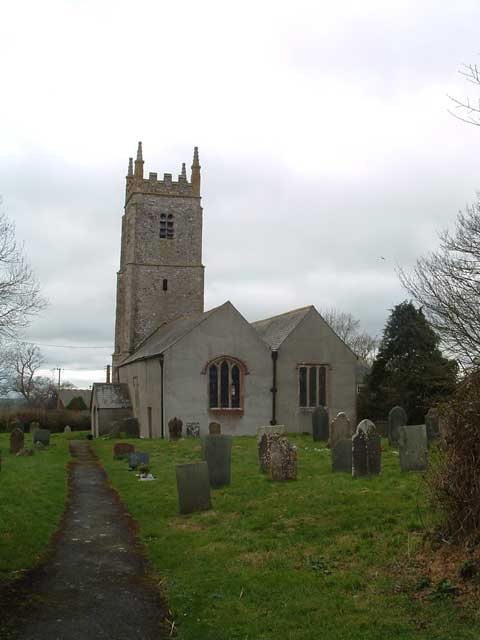
- St Peter's Church

- Location within Devon
- OS grid reference: SS 5687 1032
- Civil parish: Dowland
- District: Torridge
- Shire county: Devon
- Region: South West
- Country: England
- Sovereign state: United Kingdom
- Post town: Winkleigh
- Postcode district: EX19
- Dialling code: 01805
- Police: Devon and Cornwall
- Fire: Devon and Somerset
- Ambulance: South Western

Dowland is a civil parish in Devon, situated near Winkleigh. It is also the name of a hamlet in the parish.
