= Ashreigney =

Village in Devon, England

Coordinates: 50.906°N 3.951°W

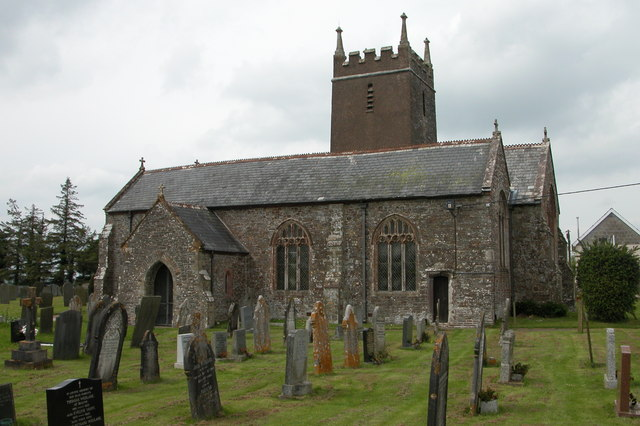
- St James' church

- Location within Devon
- OS grid reference: SS6213
- District: Torridge
- Shire county: Devon
- Region: South West
- Country: England
- Sovereign state: United Kingdom
- Post town: Chulmleigh
- Postcode district: EX18
- Police: Devon and Cornwall
- Fire: Devon and Somerset
- Ambulance: South Western
- UK Parliament: Torridge and Tavistock

Ashreigney is a village and civil parish in the Torridge district of Devon, England, about 15 miles (24 km) south of the town of Barnstaple. According to the 2001 census it had a population of 446, compared to 540 in 1901.

The church is mostly fifteenth century and has a medieval font. The village was recorded in the Domesday Book.

Within the parish is the small settlement of Riddlecombe, which was a medieval manor.
