= Abbots Bickington =

Village in Devon, England

Coordinates: 50.896°N 4.298°W

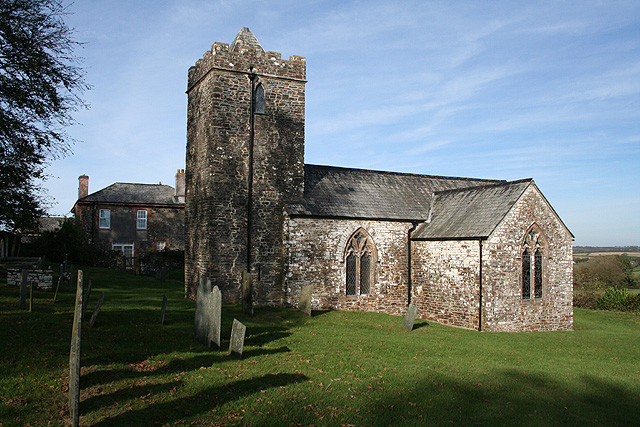
- St James' church

- Location within Devon
- Population: 35 (2001)
- District: Torridge
- Shire county: Devon
- Region: South West
- Country: England
- Sovereign state: United Kingdom
- Post town: HOLSWORTHY
- Postcode district: EX22
- Dialling code: 01409
- Police: Devon and Cornwall
- Fire: Devon and Somerset
- Ambulance: South Western
- UK Parliament: Torridge and Tavistock

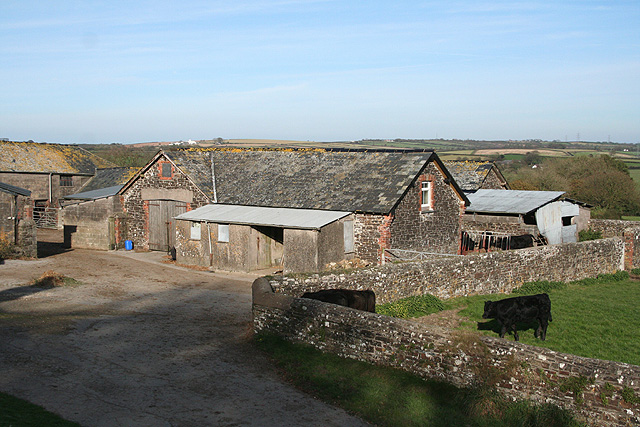
Abbots Bickington: barns at Court Barton

Abbots Bickington is a village and civil parish in the English county of Devon, located 7.7 mi (12.4 km) north-northeast of Holsworthy and near the River Torridge.

== Etymology ==
The name Bickington is derived from an "estate associated with a man named Beacca" plus the Old English practice of adding "ing" and "tūn" to create a place name. In 1086, it was recorded as Bicatona, in 1107 Bechintona, and in 1580 Abbots Bekenton, to reflect the possession by Hartland Abbey.

== Overview ==
The village is located in the Torridge local authority area. It is within the Church of England's Deanery of Holsworthy and the Diocese of Exeter.

In the late 19th century it was reported that blue limestone was quarried in the village for building construction, and trustees of Mark Rolle were patrons of the church.

== History ==
=== Normans ===
The village was held by Goda the priest in the time of King Edward the Confessor before the Norman Conquest of 1066. The area was part of the Black Torrington Hundred and had 10 households, 8 were smallholders and 2 were slaves. It is recorded in the Domesday Book of 1086–7 as Bichetone, when it was held by Gerald the Chaplain, the tenant-in-chief and lord. He was also associated with two other locations in Devon: Stoke and Shapley.

=== Abbey and manor ===
==== Hartland Abbey ====
In the 12th century, the manor was given to Hartland Abbey by Geoffrey de Dinant, (Note: Chope identifies the founder as Geoffrey de Dynam.) as part of the abbey's initial endowment. It remained as property of the abbey until dissolution in 1539. The church was built as a "cell" of the abbey.

==== Manor ====
Hugh Prust contracted for a 40-year lease of the manor.

By 1871, Mark Rolle owned most of the 1078 acres of Abbots Bickington and was lord of the manor. At that time, there were 50 people living in 8 households. Rolle paid for the 1868 renovations to the church, including installation of new seats and construction of a new roof.

=== Church of St James ===
The village church was built about 1300 of stone rubble and lancet windows. In the 15th century, stained glass were added, featuring St Anthony and St Christopher. There is also a monument to Thomas Pollard in the church.

The chancel and nave, west tower and south transept were all built about the same time. It has the original piscina. Medieval Barnstaple tiles, some with fleur-de-lys pattern, cover the chancel floor. In 1863 and 1868 the church went through processes to reseat and restore the church. The church of St James is described as "an unspoilt example of a small early church, modest in size but with a number of interesting features and very picturesque appearance."

== Population and parish governance ==
The population was 68 in 1801, 61 in 1901, and 35 in 2001. Because of low population, there is no parish council; instead, there is a parish meeting.

== Transportation ==
Abbots Bickington is located north of the A388 road.
