= Merton, Devon =

Village in Devon, England

Coordinates: 50°53′24″N 4°05′44″W

Merton
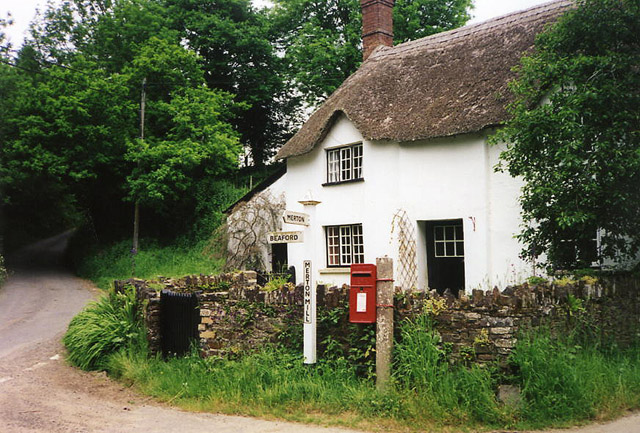
- Merton Cottage, one of the thatched buildings in the parish

- Location within Devon
- Population: 331 (2001 census)
- Civil parish: Merton
- District: Torridge
- Shire county: Devon
- Region: South West
- Country: England
- Sovereign state: United Kingdom

Merton is a village, ecclesiastical parish, former manor and civil parish administered by the local government district of Torridge, Devon, England. The parish, which lies about five miles south east of the town of Great Torrington, is surrounded clockwise from the north by the parishes of Little Torrington, Beaford, Dolton, Huish, Petrockstowe and Peters Marland. In 2001 its population was 331, down from the 507 residents it had in 1901. The eastern and northern boundaries of the parish follow the loops of the River Torridge and the other sides are defined by the River Mere. The village forms part of the electoral ward of Clinton. The population at the 2011 census was 1,537.

The village is on the A386 road between Meeth and Great Torrington. The parish church, on the west side of the village, is dedicated to All Saints and dates from around 1400. It suffered a heavy Victorian restoration between 1872 and 1875 by R. M. Fulford, but the east window of the north chapel retains many fragments of late medieval stained glass. Speccot, Dunsbear and Potheridge were estates mentioned in the Domesday Book of 1086.

== Merton Moor ==
Merton Moor on the border between the parishes of Merton and Petrockstowe, has been the site of ball clay extraction for many years, and the North Devon and Cornwall Junction Light Railway ran through the west of the parish between 1925 and 1982 to serve the ball clay industry. Today the former railway line forms part of the Tarka Trail series of footpaths and cycle tracks.

== Historic estates ==
Various historic estates are situated within the parish including:

- Potheridge, now a farmhouse, long the seat of the Monck family and the birthplace in 1608 of General George Monck, 1st Duke of Albemarle, the main force behind the Restoration of the Monarchy to King Charles II in 1660. General Monck reconstructed the house on a grand scale, presumably after 1660, but much of it was demolished some time after 1734. Surviving features include a late-17th-century grand staircase and part of the great hall with its ornate overmantel.
- Speccot, in the mediaeval age the seat of the prominent de Speccot family.
