= Alwington =

Village in Devon, England

Coordinates: 51°00′N 4°16′W

- Village and Civil Parish
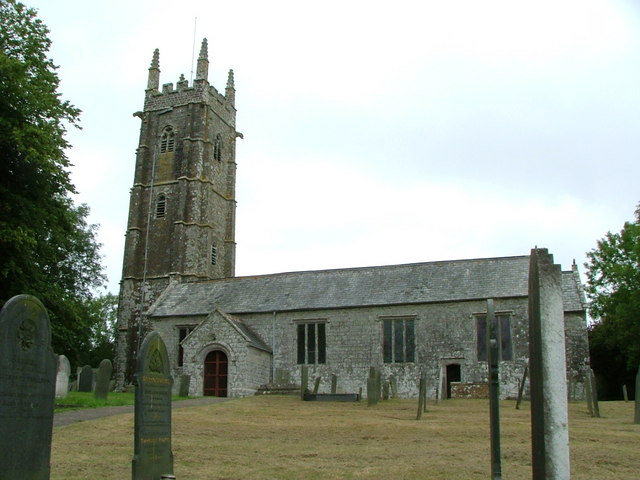
- St Andrew's Alwington
- Interactive map of Alwington
- Country: United Kingdom
- Province: England
- County: Devon
- District: Torridge

Population (2011)
  - Total: 400 (2,011 census)

Alwington is a village and civil parish in the Torridge district of Devon, England. The parish is on the coast and includes the hamlets of Alwington, Fairy Cross, Ford, Knotty Corner and Woodtown. The parish has a total population of 381 (2001 census), increasing at the 2011 census to 400.

== "Bible of Alwington" ==
The Bible of Alwington is the name given to the carvings inside the church, depicting Biblical scenes. These carvings cover the reredos, pulpit and manorial pew. They were carved by Reuben Arnold, a twentieth century carpenter from Monkleigh.

== Historic estates ==
- Portledge, ancient seat of the Coffin family, lords of the manor of Alwington.
- Yeo Vale
