= Langtree =

Village and civil parish in Devon, England

Coordinates: 50.919°N 4.206°W

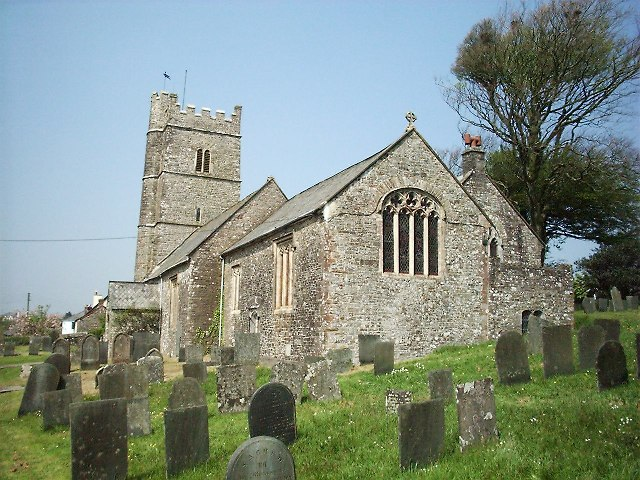
- Langtree church

- Location within Devon
- Population: 837 (2021 census)
- Civil parish: Langtree
- District: Torridge
- Shire county: Devon
- Region: South West
- Country: England
- Sovereign state: United Kingdom

Langtree is a village and parish in north Devon, England, situated about 4 miles (6 km) south-west of Great Torrington and 8 miles (13 km) south of Bideford. Its name means "tall tree". Torridge District Council and Devon County Council are responsible for local government, while for religious administrative purposes it is part of the Archdeaconry of Barnstaple and the Diocese of Exeter. In 2021 the parish had a population of 837.

As well as houses and farms, Langtree village contains:

- All Saints' Church – a 13th-century Anglican church.
- Langtree Community School and Nursery Unit, a state-funded primary school. It was built in 1929 and was extended in 1992 and 1998–1999.
- A modern Parish Hall, which attracted attention in 2003 by staging the controversial pantomime Snow White and the Seven Asylum Seekers, written by Bob Harrod.
- A chapel.
- The Green Dragon pub.
- A shop and post office which have now been closed.

Langtree parish also includes the smaller village of Stibb Cross.

An entry in White's History, Gazetteer, and Directory of Devonshire (1850) reads: "LANGTREE is a considerable village, 3½ miles S.W. of Great Torrington, and has in its parish 911 souls, and 4028 acres (16 km^{2}) of land, including the hamlets of Stowford and Week. The Trustees of the late Lord Rolle own most of the soil, and are lords of the manors of Langtree and Stowford, and patrons of the rectory ... The Church has a tower and five bells, and contains several neat monuments. There was anciently a chapel at Cross hill. The National School, built in 1840, is supported by the rector." The school referred to was situated next to the church and later used as a village hall.

The National Gazetteer of Great Britain and Ireland (1868) adds: "The village, which is considerable, is wholly agricultural. The soil is clayey, but in some parts rich, producing good crops of wheat and barley. The prevailing timber is oak and pine. The road from Torrington to Holsworthy and Launceston passes through the parish. The tithes have been commuted for a rent-charge of £510. The living is a rectory in the diocese of Exeter, value £348. The church, dedication unknown, is an ancient stone structure, with a tower containing five bells. There was formerly a chapel-of-ease at Cross-Hill. The parochial charities produce about £55 per annum. There is a parochial school for both sexes, in which a Sunday-school is also held. The Baptists and Bible Christians have each a chapel. The trustees of the late Lord Rolle are lords of the manor."

UK national grid reference for centre point of Langtree: SS451156
