= Woolfardisworthy, Torridge =

Village in Devon, England

Coordinates: 50.96472°N 4.37694°W

Woolfardisworthy: Woolsery
- Village
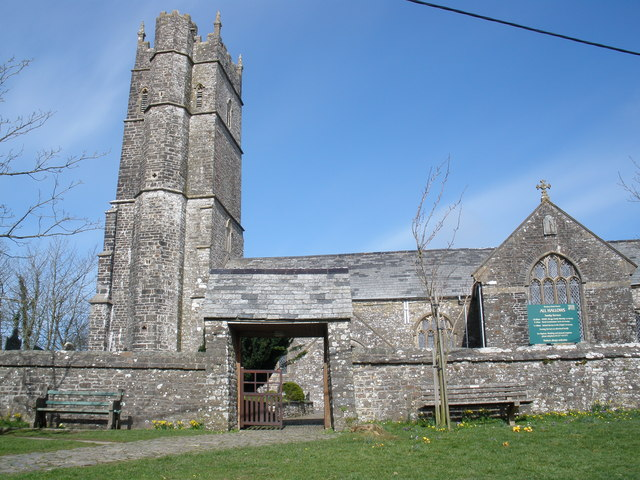
- All Hallows' Church

- Location within Devon
- Population: 1,123
- Civil parish: Woolsery
- District: Torridge
- Shire county: Devon
- Region: South West
- Country: England
- Sovereign state: United Kingdom
- Post town: Bideford
- Postcode district: EX39
- Dialling code: 01237
- Police: Devon and Cornwall
- Fire: Devon and Somerset
- Ambulance: South Western
- UK Parliament: Torridge and Tavistock

Woolfardisworthy (/ˈwʊlzəri/ WUUL-zər-ee), also spelt Woolsery, is a village and civil parish in the Torridge district of Devon, England. The village is accessible via the A39 road, 2 miles (3 km) from the village.

== Name ==
Woolfardisworthy, jointly with a few other places in Devon, has one of the longest place names in England, with 16 letters. As the modern pronunciation of the village, known to have been in use since the 17th century, is /ˈwʊlzəri/, its name is sometimes marked on local signs as Woolsery alongside the original spelling.

The original meaning of the name is probably "Wulfheard's homestead" – the element -worthy being from Old English worþig, one of several words used by the Anglo-Saxons to denote a homestead, farmstead, or small settlement.

== All Hallows Church ==
In the parish church dedicated to All Hallows is the large monument with effigy to Richard Cole (d.1614) of Buckish within the parish, also of Slade in the parish of Cornworthy, Devon. It is a Grade 1 British Listed Building.

== Recent history ==
In October 2014 Michael Birch and Xochi Birch, founders of the social networking site Bebo, through a hospitality group named The Collective bought the Farmers Arms public house and Manor House properties in the village. Michael Birch's grandmother was born and lived in the village, and he spent many childhood summers there. The pub, which had closed in December 2012, reopened in September 2018. The Manor House is to be restored and put into use as a hotel. They also own the chip shop, village stores, and several residential properties.

The Centre for Fortean Zoology is based in the village.
