= Bulkworthy =

Village and civil parish in Devon, England

Coordinates: 50°54′N 4°18′W

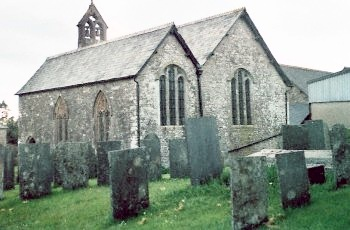
- St Michael, Bulkworthy

- Location within Devon
- Population: 83 (2001 census)
- Civil parish: Bulkworthy
- District: Torridge
- Shire county: Devon
- Region: South West
- Country: England
- Sovereign state: United Kingdom

Bulkworthy is a village and civil parish in the Torridge district of Devon, England, about 9 miles southwest of Great Torrington, and on the River Torridge. According to the 2001 census it had a population of 83. It is listed in the Domesday Book as Buchesworde.
