= River Torridge =

River in Devon, England

Torridge
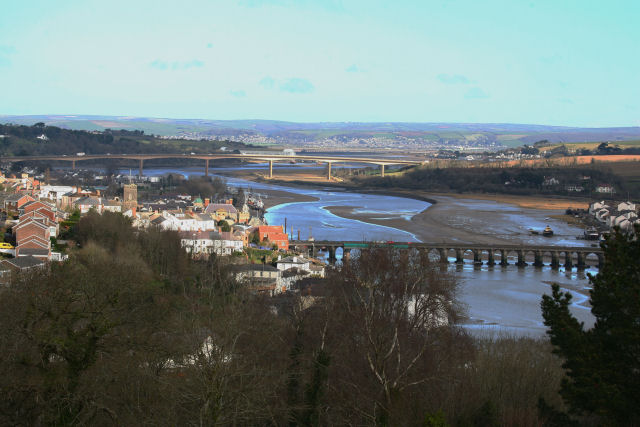
- Bridges over River Torridge at Bideford looking downstream from Upcott Hill

- Location within Devon

Location
- Country: England
- Region: Devon

Physical characteristics
- Source
  - location: Higher Clovelly
  - coordinates: 50.9845°N 4.4028°W
  - elevation: 206 m (676 ft)
- Mouth: Bristol Channel
  - location: north of Bideford
  - coordinates: 51.0596°N 4.1970°W
  - elevation: 0 m (0 ft)
- Length: 93 km (58 mi)

Basin features
- Tributaries
  - left: River Mere, River Yeo
  - right: River Waldon, Whiteleigh Water, River Lew, River Okement, Beaford Brook, River Taw

The River Torridge is a river in Devon in England; it rises near Meddon. The river describes a long loop through Devon farming country where its tributaries the Lew and Okement join before meeting the Taw at Appledore and flowing into the Bristol Channel. The river is spate dependent and often flows between wooded banks which can be steep. The Torridge local government district is named after the river.

It was the home of Tarka the Otter in Henry Williamson's book.

== Route ==
The river rises close to the border with Cornwall (north of the source of the River Tamar). Its two primary sources are Seckington Water, which rises near Baxworthy Cross, and Clifford Water, the longer of the two, which rises alongside the A39 at Higher Clovelly. These run south and join to form the Torridge at Huddisford. It then flows generally east, passing between East Putford and West Putford, and near Bradford it is joined by the River Waldon, then heads east past Black Torrington and Sheepwash. It is joined by the River Lew near Hatherleigh, and then by the River Okement near Meeth.

It then flows northwards, picking up the River Mere south of Beaford. After this it makes tight bends, and goes past Little Torrington and Great Torrington heading generally north-west. It is joined by the River Yeo at Pillmouth, and then becomes estuarine by Bideford. Between Appledore and Instow it joins the estuary of the River Taw and enters Bideford Bay.

The Tarka Trail walking and cycle route partly follows the course of the North Devon Railway, which, for a considerable distance, closely followed the line of the river. South of Bideford the railway crossed from one bank to the other, and the Trail provides a good vantage point for viewing the river.

== List of bridges ==
The following is a list of bridges over the River Torridge listed going upstream from the estuary at Bideford:

- Torridge A39 Road Bridge
- Bideford Long Bridge
- Iron Bridge- Disused Railway Bridge, now Tarka Trail, Pillmouth, Bideford
- Halfpenny Bridge, Annery/ Weare Giffard
- Disused Railway Bridge- Tarka trail, North of Beam House
- Beam Aqueduct, (Rolle Canal), Beam, Great Torrington
- Disused Railway Bridge- Tarka trail, Broomdown Copse
- Rothern Bridge (old course of A386), Great Torrington
- Rolle Bridge, Great Torrington
- Disused Railway Bridge- Tarka trail, Great Torrington
- Taddiport Bridge, Great Torrington
- New Bridge, Great Torrington
- Beaford Bridge, Beaford Mill
- New Bridge, Newbridge
- Hele Bridge, A386
- Ruined Disused Railway Bridge, North of site of Hatherleigh Station
- Rockhay Bridge (private road)
- Sheepwash Bridge
- Black Torrington Bridge
- Coham Bridge
- Dippermill Bridge
- Gidcottmill Bridge
- Woodford Bridge
- Haytown Bridge
- Putford Bridge, West Putford
- Kismeldon Bridge
- Ashmansworthy Bridge
- Fordmill Bridge
- Horton Bridge, Bideford
- Brimford Cross, near Meddon

== Sources ==
- Pevsner, Nikolaus; Cherry, Bridget (2004). The Buildings of England – Devon. Yale University Press. ISBN 0300095961.
