= Torridge and Tavistock =

UK Parliament constituency (since 2024)

- County constituency for the House of Commons
- Interactive map of boundaries since 2024
- Boundary of Torridge and Tavistock in South West England
- County: Devon
- Electorate: 74,802 (2023)
- Major settlements: Tavistock

Current constituency
- Created: 2024
- Member of Parliament: Geoffrey Cox (Conservative)
- Seats: One
- Created from: Torridge and West Devon & South West Devon

Torridge and Tavistock is a constituency of the House of Commons in the UK Parliament. Further to the completion of the 2023 Periodic Review of Westminster constituencies, it was first contested at the 2024 general election. It is represented by Conservative Sir Geoffrey Cox KC, who had been the MP for the predecessor seat of Torridge and West Devon from 2005 to 2024.

== Constituency profile ==
Bideford Long Bridge

Torridge and Tavistock is a constituency in Devon in South West England, covering the Torridge district and part of the West Devon district. Its largest town is Bideford, which has a population of around 20,000. Other settlements include the towns of Tavistock, Northam, Great Torrington and Holsworthy and the village of Westward Ho!.

This is a large, rural constituency with many small towns and villages, stretching between Bideford on Devon's north coast to the outskirts of Plymouth. Bideford is a historic port town and traditionally a centre for shipbuilding. The North Devon Coast to the west of Bideford is a national landscape popular with tourists for its cliffs and beaches. Tavistock is a market town with a history of copper mining. The town lies close to Dartmoor, a national park of upland moors. Most of the constituency has below-average levels of wealth with some deprivation in Bideford, although Tavistock and Northam are more affluent. House prices across the constituency are generally lower than the regional and UK averages.

Torridge and Tavistock has low proportions of young and middle-aged adults and a large retired population; in 2024, 30% of residents were aged 65 or over. Residents have low rates of income but high levels of homeownership. The child poverty rate is above-average. Residents have low levels of education and a high proportion work in the agriculture, tourism and retail sectors. The percentage claiming unemployment benefits is low. White people made up 98% of the population at the 2021 census.

At the local district council level, most of this constituency is represented by independents with some Green Party councillors elected in Bideford and Northam and some Conservatives and Liberal Democrats elected in the rural villages. At the county council, which held elections more recently (in 2025), most seats in this constituency were won by Reform UK. An estimated 59% of voters in Torridge and Tavistock supported leaving the European Union in the 2016 referendum, higher than the UK-wide figure of 52%.

== Boundaries ==
The constituency is composed of the following (as they existed on 1 December 2020):

- The District of Torridge.
- The Borough of West Devon wards of: Bere Ferrers; Bridestowe; Dartmoor; Mary Tavy; Milton Ford; Tamarside; Tavistock North; Tavistock South East; Tavistock South West.

It comprises the bulk of the former Torridge and West Devon seat, excluding the West Devon Borough wards of Buckland Monachorum and Burrator in the south, which were transferred to South West Devon.

== Members of Parliament ==
| Election | Member | Party |
|---|---|---|
| 2024 | Geoffrey Cox | Conservative |

== Elections ==
=== Elections in the 2020s ===
General election 2024: Torridge and Tavistock
| Party | Candidate | Votes | % | ±% |
|---|---|---|---|---|
| Conservative | Geoffrey Cox | 16,049 | 31.6 | −28.2 |
| Liberal Democrats | Phil Hutty | 12,099 | 23.8 | +5.9 |
| Labour | Isabel Saxby | 10,765 | 21.2 | +3.3 |
| Reform | Andrew Jackson | 9,152 | 18.0 | N/A |
| Green | Judy Maciejowska | 2,350 | 4.6 | +1.2 |
| Independent | Alan Edward Rayner | 405 | 0.8 | N/A |
| Majority | | 3,950 | 7.8 | −34.1 |
| Turnout | | 50,820 | 68.0 | −5.1 |
| Registered electors | | 74,727 | | |
| Conservative hold | | Swing | −17.1 | |

2019 notional result
| Party | Vote | % |
|---|---|---|
| Conservative | 32,708 | 59.8 |
| Liberal Democrats | 9,809 | 17.9 |
| Labour | 9,761 | 17.9 |
| Green | 1,843 | 3.4 |
| Others | 547 | 1.0 |
| Turnout | 54,668 | 73.1 |
| Electorate | 74,802 | |
