= Torridge District =

Local Government district in Devon, England

Coordinates: 50.893°N 4.265°W

Torridge Torridge District
- Non-metropolitan district
- Torridge shown within Devon
- Sovereign state: United Kingdom
- Constituent country: England
- Region: South West England
- Non-metropolitan county: Devon
- Status: Non-metropolitan district
- Admin HQ: Bideford
- Incorporated: 1 April 1974

Government
  - Type: Non-metropolitan district council
  - Body: Torridge District Council
  - MPs: Geoffrey Cox

Area
  - Total: 380.4 sq mi (985.3 km^{2})
  - Rank: 26th (of 296)

Population (2024)
  - Total: 69,841
  - Rank: 286th (of 296)
  - Density: 183.6/sq mi (70.88/km^{2})
  - Ethnicity: 98.2% White (96.1% White British)
- Time zone: UTC0 (GMT)
  - Summer (DST): UTC+1 (BST)
- ONS code: 18UK (ONS); E07000046 (GSS)
- OS grid reference: SS4072412895

Torridge is a local government district in north-west Devon, England. Its council is based in the town of Bideford. The district also includes the towns of Great Torrington, Holsworthy and Northam, along with numerous villages and surrounding rural areas. The island of Lundy forms part of the district. The district is named after the River Torridge.

The district's coast is recognised for its natural beauty, forming part of the North Devon Coast, an Area of Outstanding Natural Beauty. The South West Coast Path runs through the area.

The neighbouring districts are North Devon, Mid Devon, West Devon and Cornwall.

== History ==
The district was formed on 1 April 1974 under the Local Government Act 1972. The new district covered the area of six former districts, which were all abolished at the same time, plus Lundy Island:

- Bideford Municipal Borough
- Bideford Rural District
- Great Torrington Municipal Borough
- Holsworthy Rural District
- Lundy Island
- Northam Urban District
- Torrington Rural District

The new district was named after the River Torridge which flows through the area.

The current districts of North Devon and Torridge (apart from Holsworthy) were originally planned to be a single district. It was then decided to make them two districts and extract Holsworthy from West Devon.

Under current local government restructuring plans it is planned that the district will be abolished in 2028 with its area becoming part of a new Devon unitary authority.

== Governance ==
Torridge District Council

Type
- Type: Non-metropolitan district

History
- Founded: 1 April 1974

Leadership
- Chair: Doug Bushby, Independent since 26 April 2021
- Leader: Ken James, Independent since 9 December 2019
- Chief Executive: Steve Hearse since April 2020

Structure
- Seats: 36 councillors
- Political groups: Liberal Democrat (12) Independents (11) Conservative (5) Green Party (4) Labour (2) Non-aligned (2)

Elections
- Voting system: First past the post
- Last election: 4 May 2023
- Next election: 6 May 2027

Meeting place
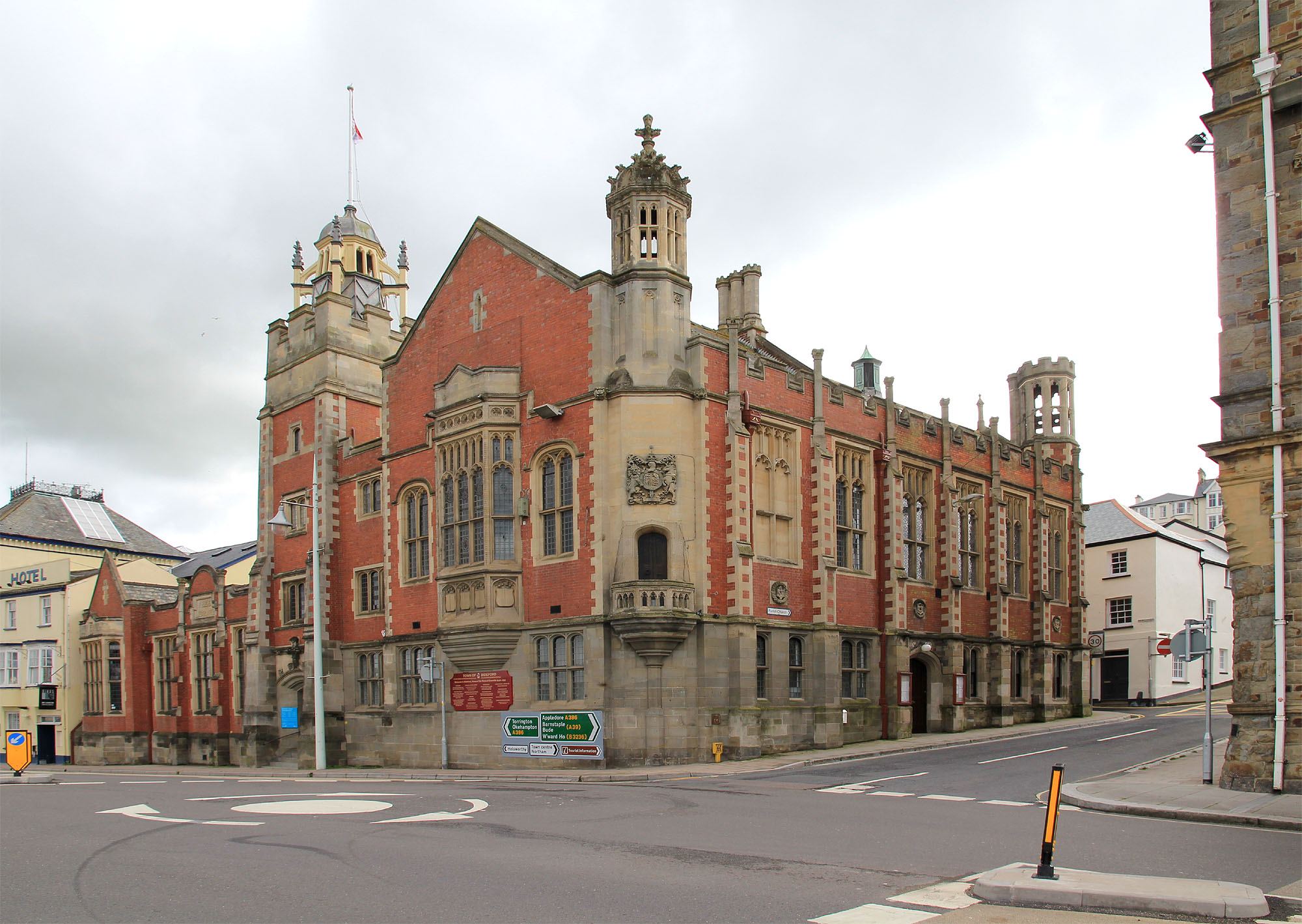
- Town Hall, Bridge Street, Bideford, EX39 2HS

Website
- torridge.gov.uk

Constitution
- The Constitution of Torridge District Council

Torridge District Council provides district-level services. County-level services are provided by Devon County Council. Most of the district is also covered by civil parishes, which form a third tier of local government.

=== Political control ===
The council has been under no overall control since the 2023 election, with an independent councillor serving as leader of the council. Lead members for different aspects of the council's responsibilities are appointed from all parties rather than one political group forming an administration.

The first election to the council was held in 1973, initially operating as a shadow authority alongside the outgoing authorities until the new arrangements took effect on 1 April 1974. Political control of the council since 1974 has been as follows:

Party in control	Years
Independent	1974–1995
No overall control	1995–1999
Independent	1999–2007
No overall control	2007–2015
Conservative	2015–2017
No overall control	2017–2022
Independent	2022–2023
No overall control	2023–present

=== Leadership ===
The leaders of the council since 2004 have been:

Councillor	Party	From	To
Pat Ferguson	Independent	pre-2004	May 2007
James Morrish	Conservative	21 May 2007	May 2011
Barry Parsons	Conservative	23 May 2011	20 May 2013
Philip Collins	Independent	20 May 2013	May 2015
Jane Whittaker	Conservative	18 May 2015	May 2019
Anna Dart	Independent	13 May 2019	Dec 2019
Ken James	Independent	9 Dec 2019	

=== Composition ===
Following the 2023 election and by-elections in May 2024, May 2025, October 2025 and December 2025, the composition of the council was:

Party	Councillors
Liberal Democrats	12
Conservative	5
Green	4
Labour	2
Independent	13
Total	36

Of the thirteen independent councillors, eleven form the "Independent Group" and the other two are not aligned to any group. The next election is due in 2027.

=== Premises ===
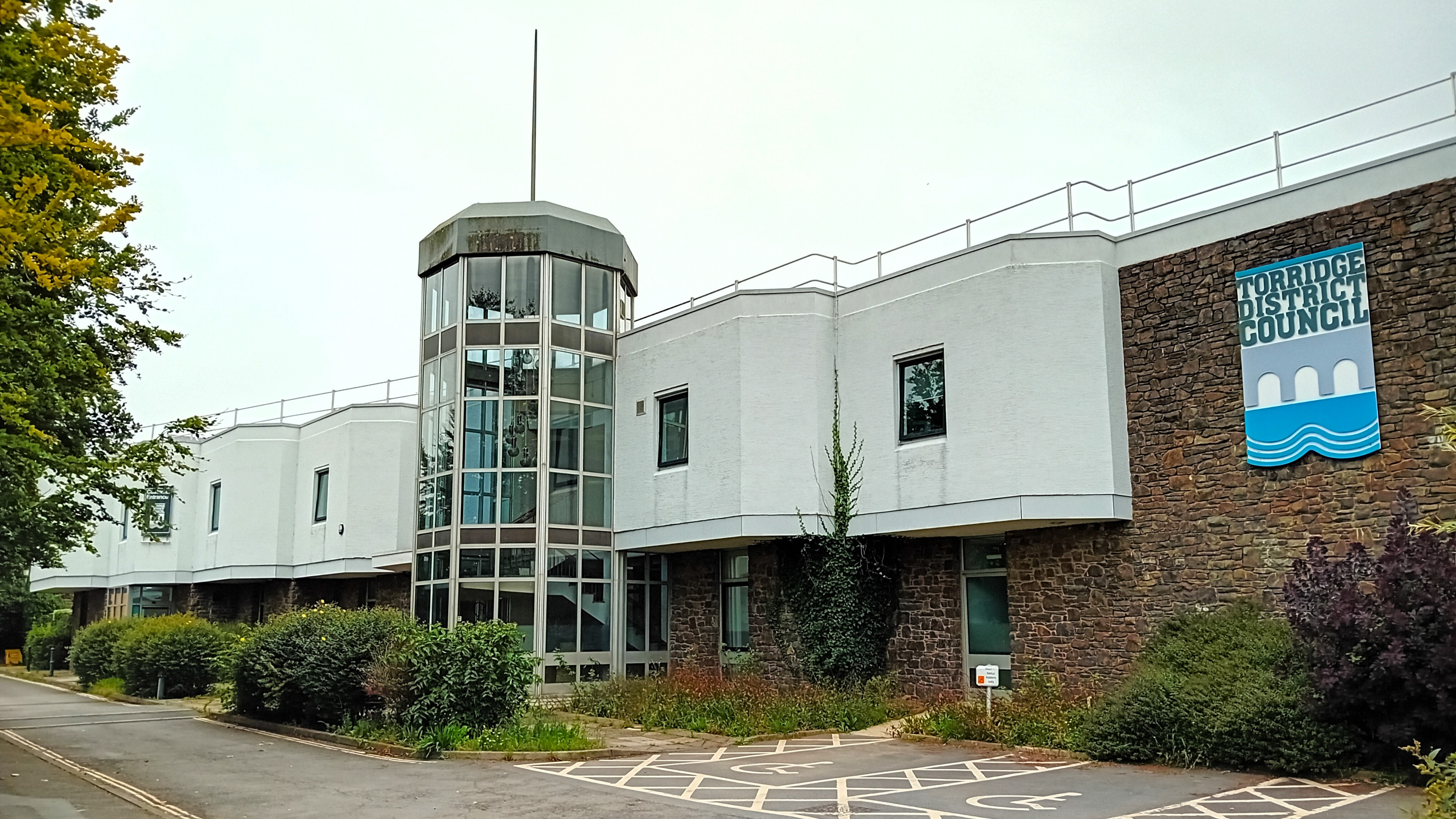
Riverbank House, Chanters Road, Bideford: Council's main offices

Council meetings are usually held at Bideford Town Hall, which had been built in 1851 for the old Bideford Corporation. The council's main offices are at Riverbank House in Bideford, which had been built c. 1982 as the headquarters of the Western Counties Building Society, before being bought by Torridge District Council in 1988.

=== Elections ===
Since the last boundary changes in 2019, the council has comprised 36 councillors representing 16 wards, with each ward electing one, two or three councillors. Elections are held every four years.

== Towns and parishes ==
Most of Torridge is covered by civil parishes. The exception is Lundy, which is an unparished area. Some of the smaller parishes have a parish meeting rather than a parish council. The parish councils for Bideford, Great Torrington, Holsworthy and Northam take the style "town council".

== Torridge CVS ==
Torridge CVS is a charitable organisation providing vulnerable people across the Torridge district with day-to-day living assistance. It provides advice, befriending schemes, support for carers, help to older people and help with charitable fund-raising, liaising with voluntary and community groups where necessary. It offers placements for individuals who want to get more involved in their local communities and relies on local volunteers, with over 2000 volunteers registered. It has been in operation since 1988 and is a member of NAVCA, the National Association for Voluntary and Community Action, being largely funded by Devon County Council and Torridge District Council.

== See also ==
- North Devon Coast – AONB
- Grade I listed buildings in Torridge
- Grade II* listed buildings in Torridge
