= Speccot, Merton =

Historic estate in Devon, England

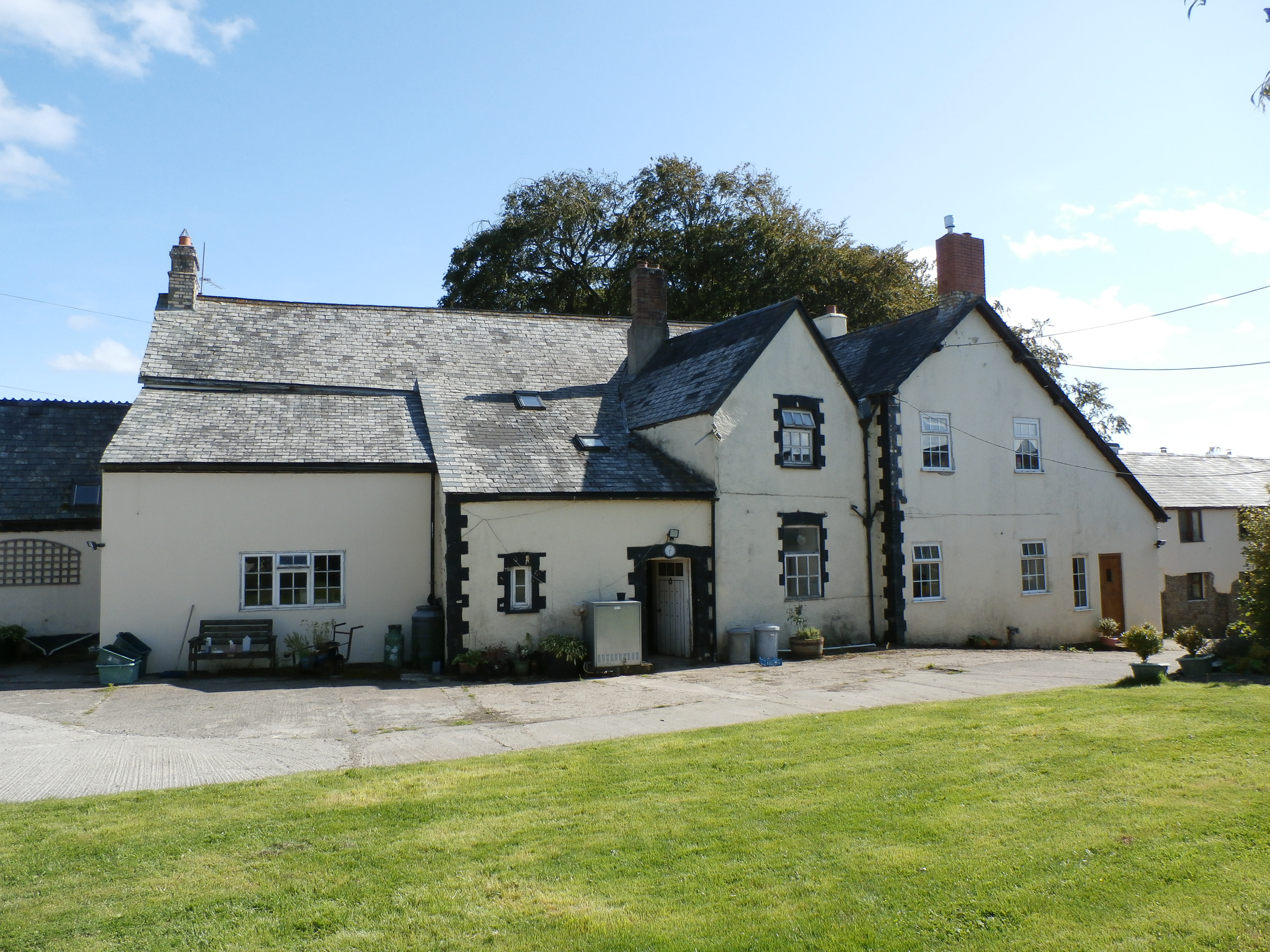
Speccot Barton, front view, in 2014

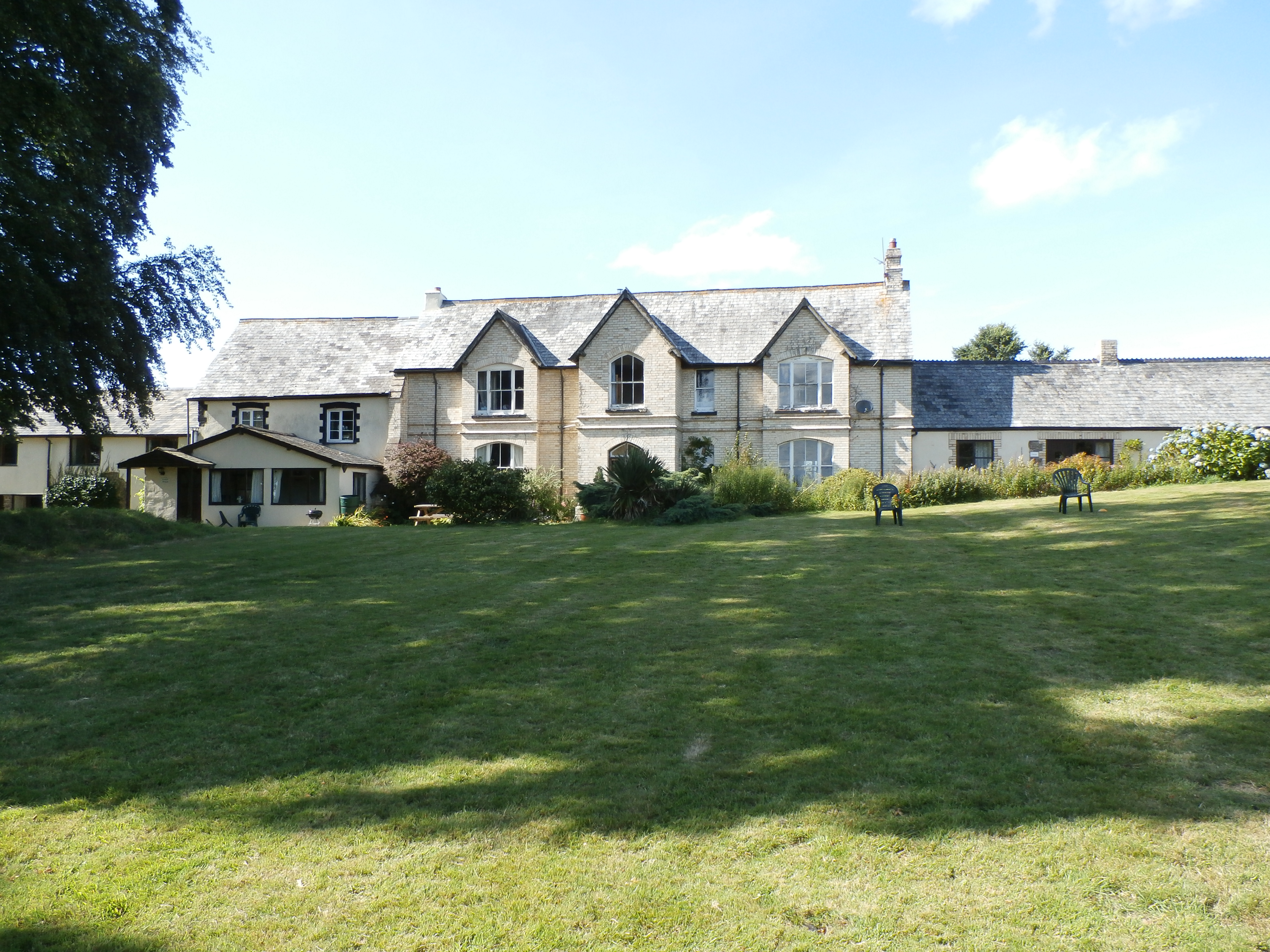
Speccot Barton, rear view, in 2014, showing 19th. c. rebuilding

Speccot Barton in 1765, detail from map by Malachy Hitchins

Speccot is an historic estate in the parish of Merton in Devon, England. It was the seat of the de Speccot family, one of the oldest gentry families in Devon, which founded almshouses at Taddiport, near Great Torrington, Devon, in the 13th century. It is situated about one mile south-west of Potheridge, the seat of the Monck family from before 1287 to the late 17th century, who were thus close neighbours of the de Speccot family for many centuries. The present farmhouse known as "Speccot Barton" is Victorian and although no obvious traces of an earlier house survive, is marked "On Site of a Mansion" on the First Edition Ordnance Survey 25 inch map of 1880-99. The estate is today operated as a family-run sheep farm with six holiday cottages to let. A smaller house known as "Little Speccot" is situated on the approach lane to Speccot Barton.

== Descent ==
=== Theobold FitzBerner ===
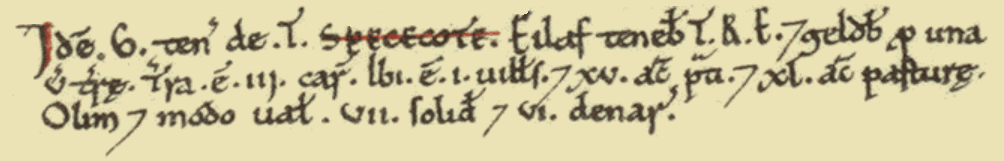
Domesday Book entry for Spececote

The manor of Spececote is listed in the Domesday Book of 1086 as one of the 27 Devonshire holdings of Theobald FitzBerner (fl. 1086), (Anglicised to "Theobald son of Berner", Latinized to Tetbaldus Filius Bernerius) an Anglo-Norman warrior and magnate, one of the Devon Domesday Book tenants-in-chief of King William the Conqueror. His tenant was a certain "Gosbert", who also held from him the Devonshire manors of South Hole, Milford (both in the parish of Hartland) and Little Marland (in the parish of Petrockstowe), listed with Speccot as successive entries in the Domesday Book. Before the Norman Conquest of 1066 it had been held by a Saxon named "Elaf". His lands later formed part of the Feudal barony of Great Torrington. The Domesday Book entry is as follows:

Ide(m) G(oisbertus) ten(et) de T(etbaldo) Spececote. Eilaf teneb(at) T(empore) R(egis) E(duardi). Geld(e)b(at) p(ro) una v(irgata) t(e)r(ra)e. T(e)r(r)a e(st) III car(ucis). Ibi e(st) I vill(anu)s, XV ac(rae) p(r)a(tuli), XL ac(rae) pastur(a)e. Olim modo va(le)t VII solid(ii) VI denar(ii). ("The same Gosbert holds Speccot from Theobald. Elaf was holding it in the time of King Edward. It was paying tax for one virgate of land. There is land for three ploughs. There is one villein, 15 acres of meadow, 40 acres of pasture. Formerly (and) now it is worth 7 shillings 6 pennies").

In the Book of Fees (c.1302) Spekcoth is listed as held from the Feudal barony of Great Torrington.

=== de Speccot ===
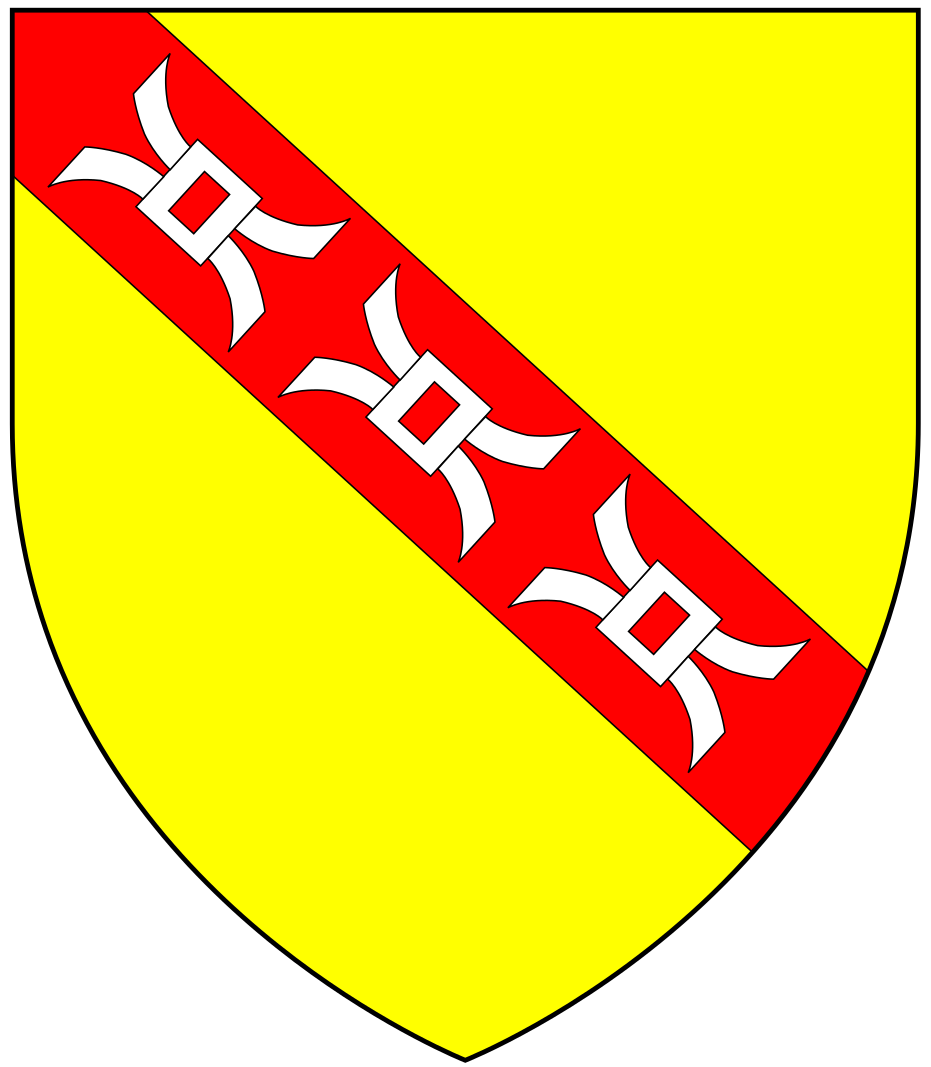
Arms of Speccot of Speccot: Or, on a bend gules three millrinds argent

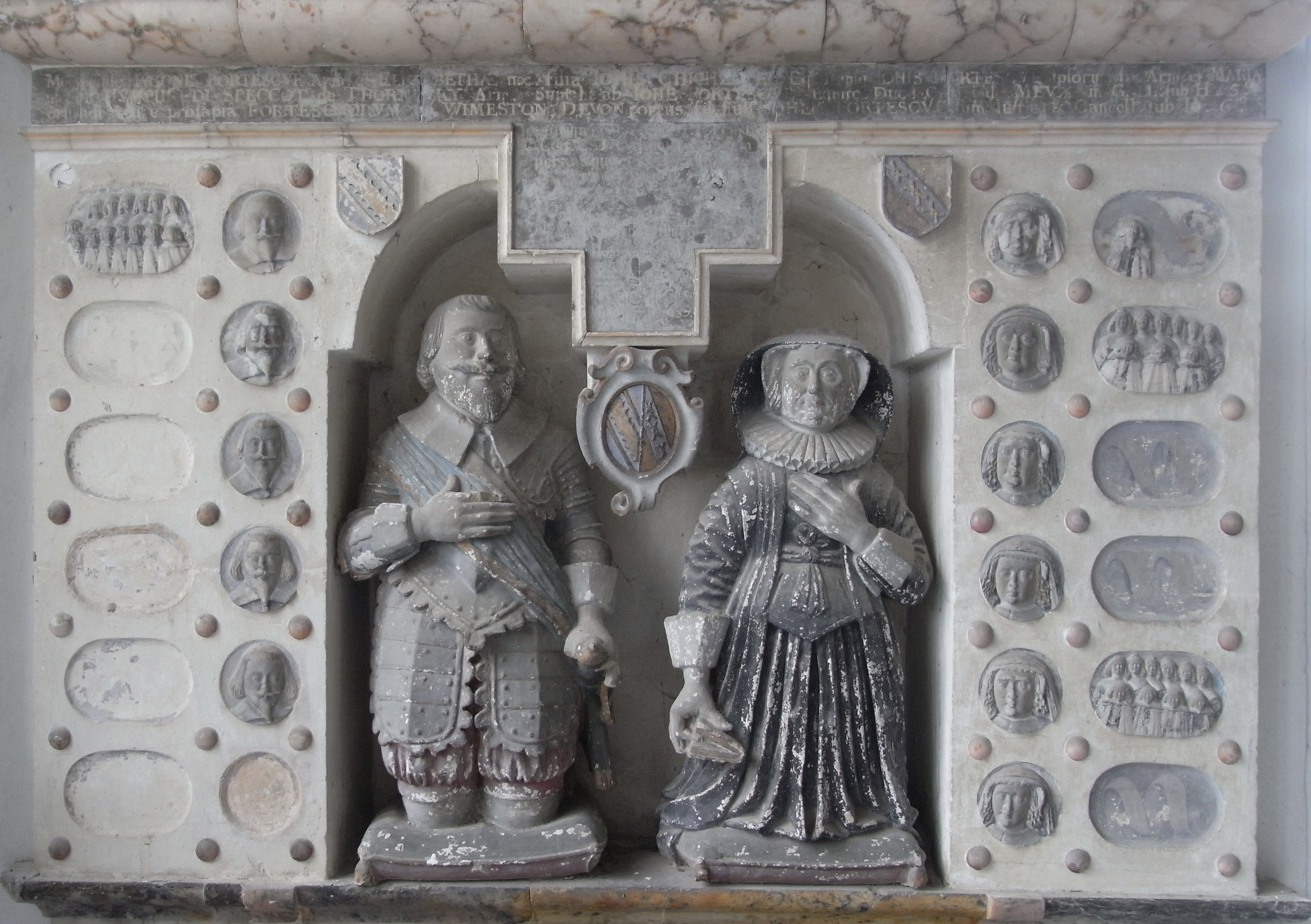
Detail from mural monument in Weare Giffard Church, Devon, to John Fortescue (d.1605) lord of the manors of Filleigh and of Weare Giffard, and his wife Mary Speccot (d.1637), a daughter of Humphry Speccot (1532-1598) of Thornbury and Speccot, MP. It displays the arms of Fortescue and Speccot. Their great-great-grandson was Hugh Fortescue, 1st Earl Clinton, 14th Baron Clinton (1696–1751), who built the surviving stately home of Castle Hill, Filleigh

In the mediaeval era it was the seat of the de Speccot family, which had taken its surname from their seat. The earliest member of this family identified by Pole was Nicholas Speccot, at the beginning of the reign of King Henry III (1216-1272). In 1438 a licence to hold services in the manor of Speccott was granted by Edmund Lacey (died 1455), Bishop of Exeter.

John Speccot (born 1425) of Speccot inherited the manor of Thornbury in Devon on the expiry of the last male of the Cornu family, as his great-grand-mother was Margaret Cornu, a daughter of Roger Cornu of Thornbury, and wife of Richard Speccot of Speccot. He abandoned Speccot and moved his primary residence to Thornbury, where his descendants remained until the family expired in the senior male line in 1655. The family retained possession of Speccot until after Sir John Speccot (c.1561-1644), MP, of Thornbury, who had a dispute with the Rector of Merton concerning the tithes due from Speccot.

Subsequent holders of Speccot belonging to the family included:

- Ralph Speccot of Speccot, MP for Cornwall in 1341.
- Humphrey Speccot (1532-1558) of Speccot, MP for Plymouth 1577-8 and Sheriff of Devon 1585/6, whose son and heir was:
  - Sir John Speccot (c.1561-1644) of Thornbury, Speccot and of Penheale in Cornwall, a Member of Parliament for St Mawes in Cornwall from 1604, Sheriff of Cornwall in 1622/3, Sheriff of Devon 1614/15, feudal baron of Great Torrington in Devon and lord of the manor of Holsworthy in Devon. He married Elizabeth Edgcumbe, a daughter of Peter Edgcumbe of Mount Edgcumbe in Cornwall. His monument with effigies survives in Thornbury Church. His sons included:
    - Peter Speccot (died 1655), eldest son and heir, of Thornbury and Speccot, MP for Tregony in Cornwall in 1624.

=== Rolle ===
Before 1737 Speccot was owned by the Rolle family of Stevenstone near Great Torrington, one of the largest land-owners in Devon.

=== Stevens ===
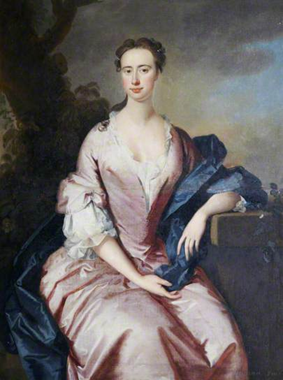
Christiana Maria Rolle (1710-1780), wife of Henry Stevens (1689-1748) of Cross and Smythacott. Portrait by Thomas Hudson, Great Torrington townhall

1765 map of Speccot, by Malachy Hitchins (1741–1809) for its then owner Richard Stevens of Winscott, Peters Marland

In 1737 Speccot was purchased from the Rolles by their relatives the Stevens family of Cross, Little Torrington. Henry Stevens (1689-1748), described in his will as "of Smithcott" in the parish of Frithelstock, but who built the existing mansion of Cross between 1744 and 1748, married Christiana Maria Rolle (1710-1780), a daughter of John Rolle (1679-1730), MP, of Stevenstone, in the nearby parish of St Giles in the Wood, and sister of Henry Rolle, 1st Baron Rolle (1708-1750). Portraits of Christiana and of her brothers John Rolle Walter (1712-1779), and Denys Rolle (d.1797), successively owners of the Stevenstone estates, were painted by Thomas Hudson and were given in the early 1900s by Lord Clinton to the Great Torrington Town Lands and Poors Charity. They are on public display in Great Torrington townhall. A "beautifully drawn map" was made of Speccot in 1765 by Malachy Hitchins (1741–1809) for its then owner Richard Stevens of Winscott, Peters Marland. Richard II Stevens (1702-1776) of Winscott, was MP for the Rolle family's pocket borough of Callington in Cornwall between 1761 and 1768. His mural monument exists in Peters Marland Church. He was one of the two sons of Richard I Stevens by his wife Elizabeth, and his brother was Henry Stevens (1689-1748) of Cross, in the parish of Little Torrington. Richard II Stevens (d.1776) married Elizabeth (1707-1760), of unknown family, by whom he had three sons who pre-deceased him without progeny and two daughters who were also without progeny. His daughter Elizabeth Stevens (1727-1792) married firstly Robert Awse of Horwood House in the parish of Frithelstock, and secondly John II Clevland (1734-1817), seven times MP for Barnstaple, of Tapeley near Bideford. Winscott passed after Cleveland's death to the descendants of Richard's elder brother, Henry Stevens (d.1748), of Cross, thus re-uniting the three Stevens estates.

=== Mallet ===
In 1810 Speccot was the property of John Mallet.

=== Risdon ===
In 1845 Speccot was the residence of Joseph Risdon, Esq.

=== Luxton ===
According to a report in the North Devon Journal, in 1860 Speccot was the residence of John Luxton, yeoman.
