= Richard Stevens (MP) =

British politician

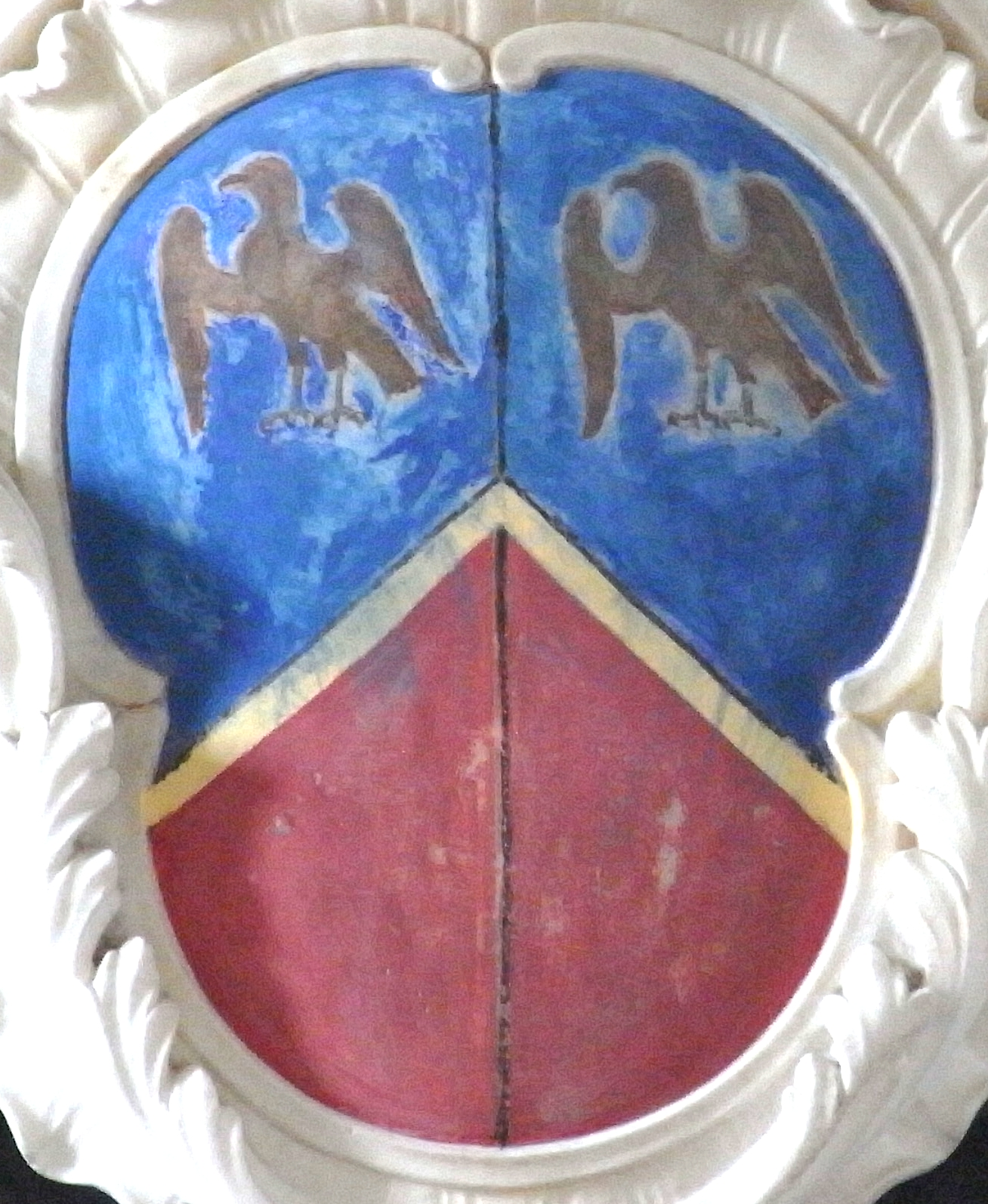
Arms of Stevens of Winscott: Per chevron azure and gules, in chief two falcons rising belled or. Detail from 1776 mural monument to Richard Stevens and his wife Elizabeth, St Peter's Church, Peters Marland

Richard Stevens (1702–1776) of Winscott in the parish of Peters Marland, Devon, was Member of Parliament for Callington in Cornwall (1761–1768).

== Origins ==
He was the second son of Richard Stevens (c. 1670 – 1727) of Vielstone in the parish of Buckland Brewer, Devon, (son of Henry Stevens (1617-post 1675) of Vielstone by his wife Judith Hancock (1650–1676), daughter of John Hancock lord of the manor of Combe Martin.) His elder brother was Henry Stevens (1689–1748) of Cross, Little Torrington and Smithacott in the parish of Frithelstock.

=== Ancestry ===
No entry for the Stevens family exists in the 1620 Heraldic Visitation of Devon, and thus the family's pedigree is not officially recorded, and the family must be assumed not to have been counted amongst the gentry of Devon at that time, or to have settled in the county after that date. The earliest record of the Stevens family in Devon is as follows:

- William Stevens (died 1648) of Great Torrington.
- Henry Stevens de Velstone, son and heir of William Stevens of Great Torrington. The earliest known seat of the Stevens family in Devon was Vielstone, in 2013 a farmhouse used as a care home, in the parish of Buckland Brewer about five miles south-west of Great Torrington. He married Judith Stevens (died 1676), daughter of John Hancock lord of the manor of Combe Martin, as is recorded on the ornate mural monument to Judith Stevens (died 1676) on the east wall of the south aisle of Great Torrington parish church. One of their sons, John Stevens (died 1674) predeceased his father, as is revealed by his grave-slab under his father's mural monument in Great Torrington Church. Henry appears to have had two sisters, both listed passim in the Visitation of Devon as "daughter of William Stevens of Great Torrington":
  - Susannah Stevens (died 1694/5), who married firstly Alexander Rolle (died 1660) of Tawstock, a younger son of a junior line of the Rolles of Stevenstone. She married secondly in 1664, as his third wife, Sir John Chichester (1598–1669) of Hall, in the parish of Bishops Tawton, and had issue from both marriages.
  - Mary Stevens (died 1669), buried at St Giles in the Wood, married in 1639 Henry Rolle (1605–1647), of Beam near Great Torrington, who in 1642 inherited from his infant cousin Denys Rolle (1638–1642) the Stevenstone estates. The marriage was childless and his heir was his cousin Sir John Rolle (died 1706), KB.
- Richard Stevens, son of Henry Stevens de Velstone. He married a certain Elizabeth, and had two sons:
  - Henry Stevens (1689–1748) of Cross, in the parish of Little Torrington, described in his will as "of Smithcott" in the parish of Frithelstock, but who built the existing mansion of Cross between 1744 and 1748. He married Christiana Maria Rolle (1710–1780), a daughter of John Rolle (1679–1730), MP, of Stevenstone, in the nearby parish of St Giles in the Wood, and sister of Henry Rolle, 1st Baron Rolle (1708–1750). Portraits of Christiana and of her brothers John Rolle Walter (1712–1779), and Denys Rolle (1725–1797), successively owners of the Stevenstone estates, were painted by Thomas Hudson and were given in the early 1900s by Lord Clinton to the Great Torrington Town Lands and Poors Charity. They are on public display in Great Torrington townhall. The Rolles of Stevenstone were the largest landowners on Devon. Henry Stevens's heir was his son Henry Stevens (1739–1802), who married Sarah Bridget Marwood (who married secondly John Inglett Fortescue of Buckland Filleigh), but who died without children leaving as heir his sister Christiana Stevens (1743–1828) who had married in 1779 Rev. Thomas Moore (1740–1802), vicar of Bishops Tawton.
  - Richard Stevens (1702–1776), MP, of Winscott, subject of the present article.

== Career ==
He was the chief agent in charge of the estates centred on Heanton Satchville, Petrockstowe belonging to the wealthy heiress Margaret Rolle, suo jure 15th Baroness Clinton (1709–1781). Her first husband was Robert Walpole, 2nd Earl of Orford eldest son of Robert Walpole the first Prime Minister. She lived briefly at the Walpole's palatial residence Houghton Hall in Norfolk, built by Robert Walpole in 1722, but on the failure of her marriage she moved abroad to Italy. Thus she required a trustworthy agent in Devon to manage her affairs, which included estates in Devon and Cornwall. The Rolle family controlled one of the seats in the rotten borough of Callington in Cornwall, and at the 1761 general election Richard Stevens was returned on her interest as one of its members of Parliament. He held the seat until 1768.

== Marriage and children ==
In 1724 at Frithelstock he married his cousin Elizabeth Stevens (1707–1768), only daughter and executrix of Hugh Stevens of Buckland Brewer, by whom he had children including:

- Hugh Stevens (1724–1755), predeceased his father, aged 31
- Richard Stevens (1733–1762), predeceased his father, aged 29
- Henry Stevens ()1745–1764), predeceased his father, aged 19
- Elizabeth Stevens (1727–1792), who married twice, firstly to Robert Awse of Horwood House in the parish of Frithelstock, and secondly in 1782 to John Clevland (1734–1817), of Tapeley near Bideford, seven times MP for Barnstaple. She died childless. Her mural monument survives in Peters Marland Church (see below).
- Christiana Maria Stevens (1739–1755), died aged 16.

=== Monument to Daughter ===
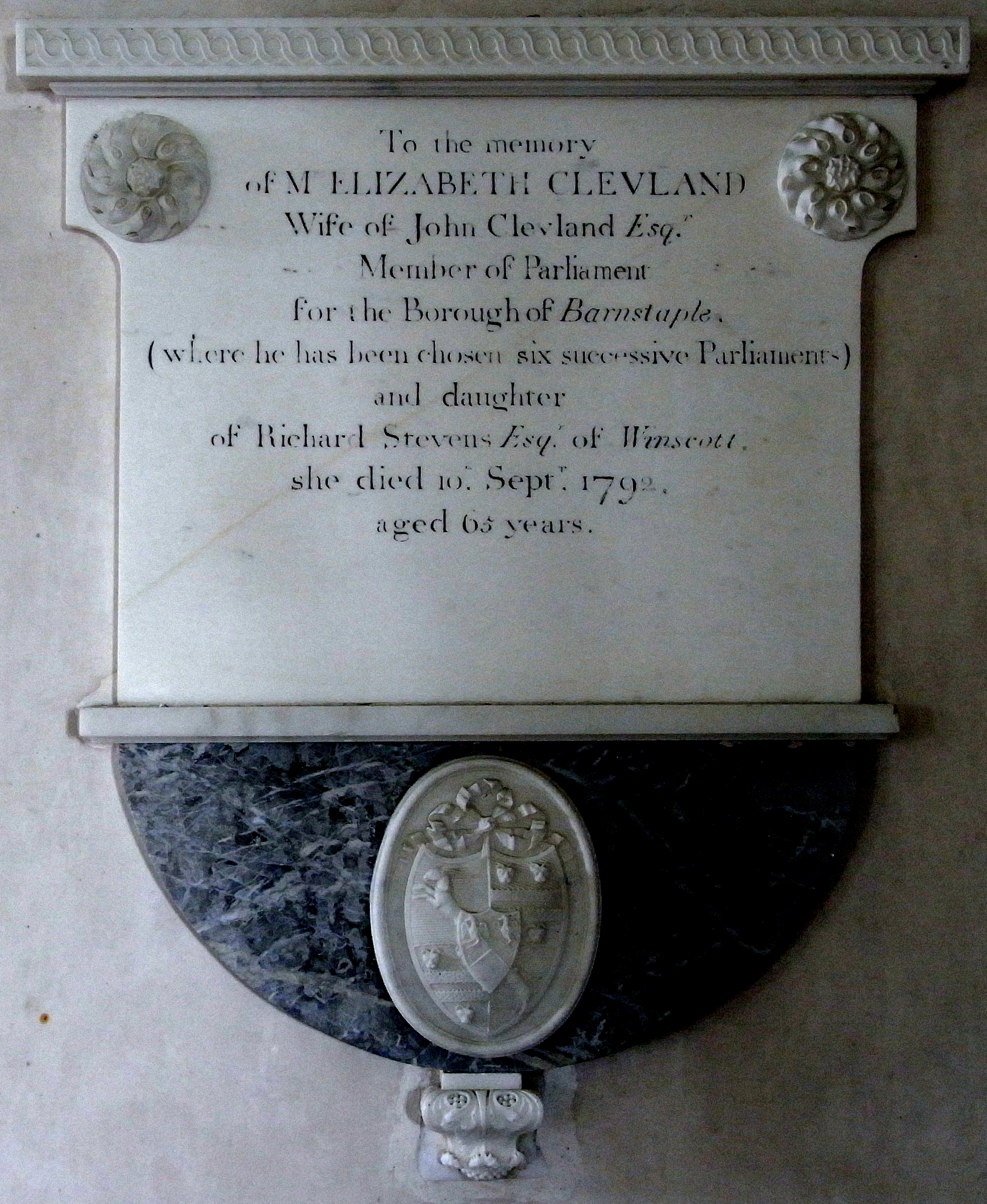
Mural monument to Elizabeth Stevens, Peters Marland Church

The mural monument to his daughter Elizabeth Stevens (1727–1792) survives in Peters Marland Church, inscribed as follows:

"To the memory of Mrs Elizabeth Clevland wife of John Clevland Esq., Member of Parliament for the Borough of Barnstaple (where he has been chosen six successive parliaments) and daughter of Richard Stevens of Winscott. She died 16 September 1792 aged 65 years"

Below is a white marble relief sculpted escutcheon showing the following arms: Quarterly 1st & 4th: Clevland; 2nd & 3rd: Vert, two bars engrailed between three leopard's faces or (Child baronets, of the City of London (1685) (Child of Surat, East Indies and Dervill, Essex, Baronet, created 1684, extinct 1753), the arms of William Clevland's mother Elizabeth Child). Overall is an inescutcheon of pretence of Stevens: Per chevron azure and gules, in chief two falcons rising belled or.

== Death ==
Richard Stevens died on 15 July 1776 aged 74, as is stated on his monument in Peters Marland Church.

== Succession ==
Winscott passed after the death of his son-in-law John Cleveland to the descendants of Richard's elder brother, Henry Stevens (died 1748), of Cross, thus re-uniting the three Stevens estates of Vielstone, Cross and Winscott.

== Monument ==
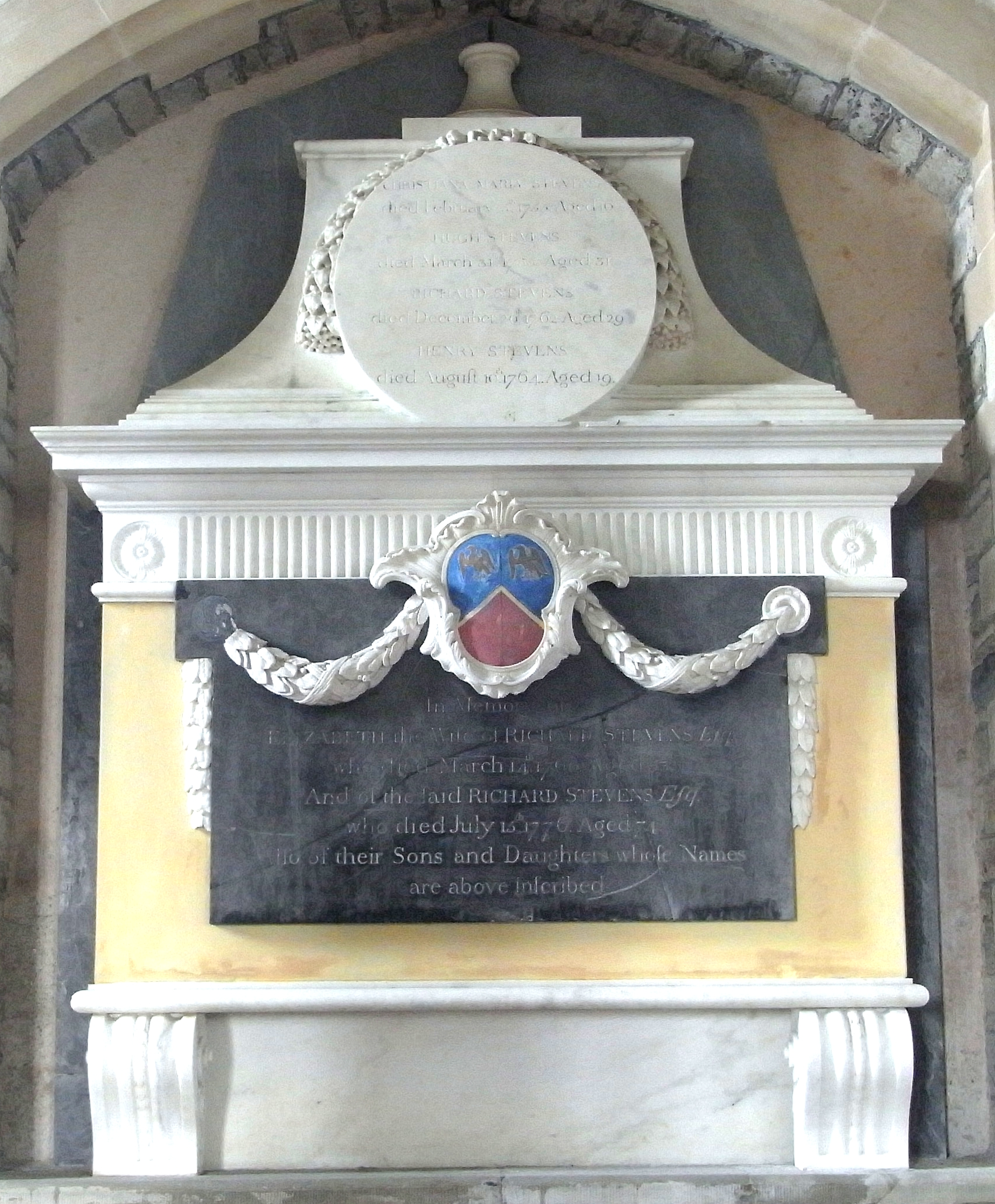
Stevens of Winscott mural monument in St Peter's Church, Peters Marland

A mural monument in St Peter's Church, Peters Marland, reset into the wall of 1865 nave, is inscribed as follows:

"In memory of Elizabeth the wife of Richard Stevens, Esqr., who died March 14th 1760 aged 53. And of the said Richard Stevens Esqr. who died July 15th 1776 aged 74. Also of their sons and daughters whose names are above inscribed: Christiana Maria Stevens died February 5th 1755 aged 16; Hugh Stevens died March 31st 1755 aged 31; Richard Stevens died December 20th 1762 aged 29; Henry Stevens died August 10th 1764 aged 19"

The arms of Stevens shown on a cartouche are: Per chevron azure and gules, in chief two falcons rising belled or. These are a difference of the arms of the senior line of Stevens of Cross, Little Torrington: Per chevron argent and gules, in chief two falcons rising proper belled or, as is visible in Little Torrington Church.

== Sources ==
- Drummond, Mary M., Biography of Stevens, Richard, of Winscott, published in The History of Parliament: the House of Commons 1754–1790, Namier, L. & Brooke, J. (eds.), 1964

Parliament of Great Britain
Preceded by Sewallis Shirley; Fane William Sharpe	Member of Parliament for Callington; 1761 – 1768; With: Fane William Sharpe	Succeeded by Thomas Worsley; Fane William Sharpe
