= Frithelstock =

Village in Devon, England

Coordinates: 50.9465°N 4.2040°W

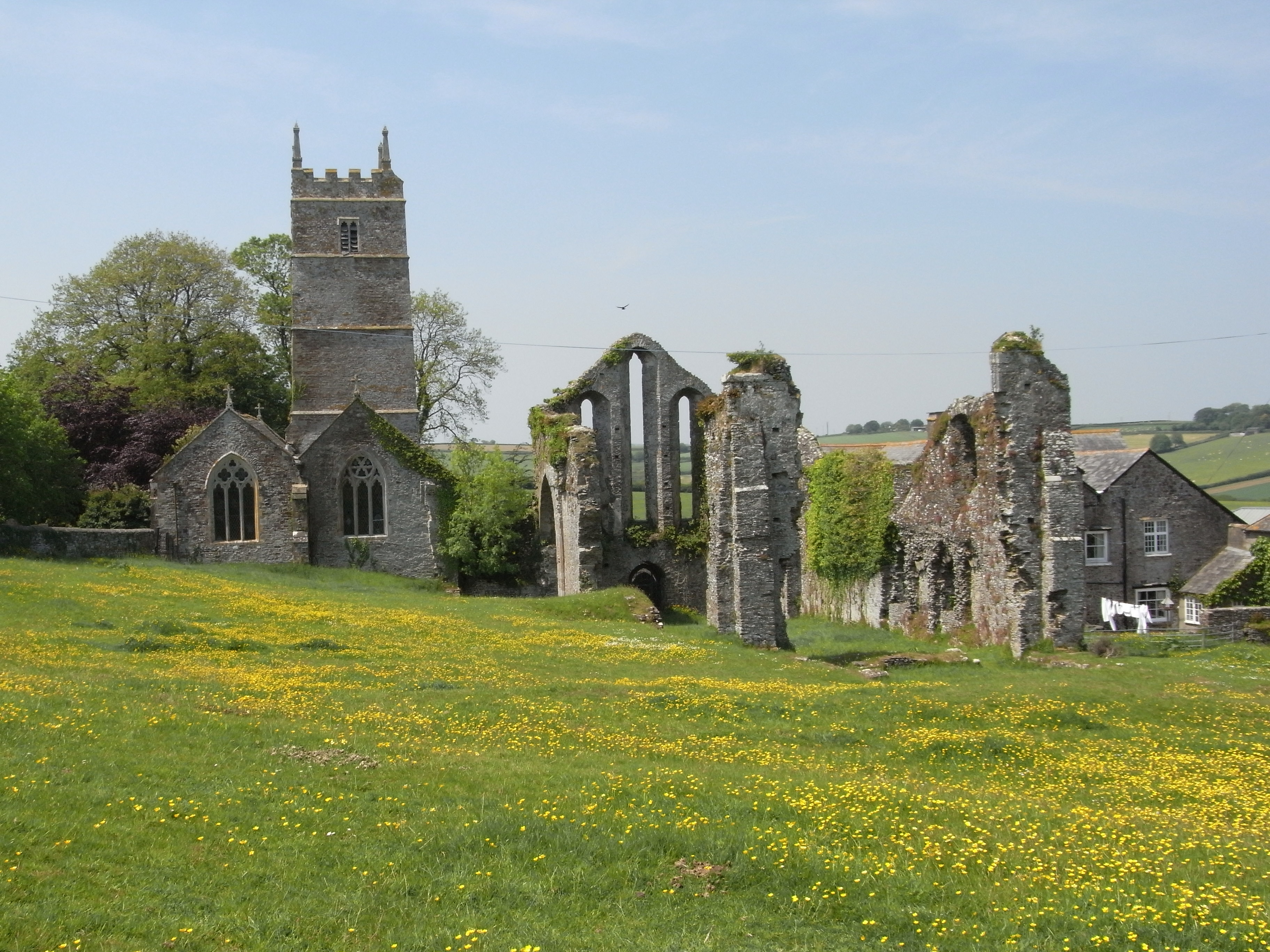
- The parish church, the Priory ruins and, on the right, the rectory

- Location within Devon
- OS grid reference: SS4619
- District: Torridge
- Shire county: Devon
- Region: South West
- Country: England
- Sovereign state: United Kingdom
- Post town: Torrington
- Postcode district: EX38
- Police: Devon and Cornwall
- Fire: Devon and Somerset
- Ambulance: South Western
- UK Parliament: Torridge and Tavistock

Frithelstock (pronounced Frizzlestock) is a village, civil parish and former manor in Devon, England. It is located within Torridge local authority area and formed part of the historic Shebbear hundred. The parish is surrounded, clockwise from the north, by the parishes of Monkleigh, Great Torrington, Little Torrington, Langtree and Buckland Brewer. In 2001 its population was 366, down from 429 in 1901.

The name derives from the Anglo-Saxon Frithulac's Stocc. The ruins of Frithelstock Priory are adjacent to the north east side of the parish church of St Mary and St Gregory, and represent the only substantial remains of a monastic house in Devon.

As of 2013 the village had one public house, the Clinton Arms, which since closed in 2018. The parish church of St. Mary & St. Gregory was enlarged in the 15th century and underwent a Victorian restoration in about 1870.

== History ==
The Domesday Book of 1086 lists Frelelestoch as one of the seventy-nine Devonshire holdings of Robert, Count of Mortain (c. 1031–1090), the half-brother of William the Conqueror. His tenant was Robert FitzIvo. The manor was later held by Sir Roger de Beauchamp who, in about 1220, donated a large part of it to the Augustinian priory dedicated to St Gregory that he had founded within it as a dependency of Hartland Abbey in North Devon.

At the dissolution of the monasteries, the prior relinquished possession of the priory and its demesne lands on 27 August 1536. The lands passed through the hands of John Wynslade, Sir George Carew of Mohuns Ottery, and Arthur Plantagenet, 1st Viscount Lisle (d.1542), being later owned by Robert Walpole, 2nd Earl of Orford, (son of the first prime minister), whose wife was Margaret Rolle, 15th Baroness Clinton (1709–1781), daughter and sole heiress of Samuel Rolle (1646–1719) of Heanton Satchville, Petrockstowe, about six miles south-east of Frithelstock. The lands later descended to Margaret Rolle's heirs, the Barons Clinton.

Henry Stevens (1698–1748), of the wealthy and influential family of Stevens, later of Cross, Little Torrington, lived at Smythacott in the parish. He married Christiana Maria Rolle (1710–1780), a sister of Henry Rolle, 1st Baron Rolle (d.1759) of Stevenstone. Their inscribed ledger stone survives in the floor of the south aisle of Frithelstock parish church.
