= 2nd Earl of Orford =

2nd Earl of Orford may refer to:

- Robert Walpole, 2nd Earl of Orford (1701–1751), British peer and politician
- Horatio Walpole, 2nd Earl of Orford (1752–1822), British peer and politician
