= Scoble =

Scoble is a surname. Notable people with the surname include:

- Robert Scoble (born 1965), American technical evangelist who worked for Microsoft until 2006 and maintains the popular blog, Scobleizer
- John Scoble (1799–1877), British abolitionist and political figure in Canada West
- Jesse Scoble (born mid-70s), Canadian writer and narrative designer of both computer games and role-playing games.

== Places ==
- Scoble, South Pool, an historic estate in Devon
