= George Walpole, 3rd Earl of Orford =

British administrator, politician and peer

The Right Honourable The Earl of Orford
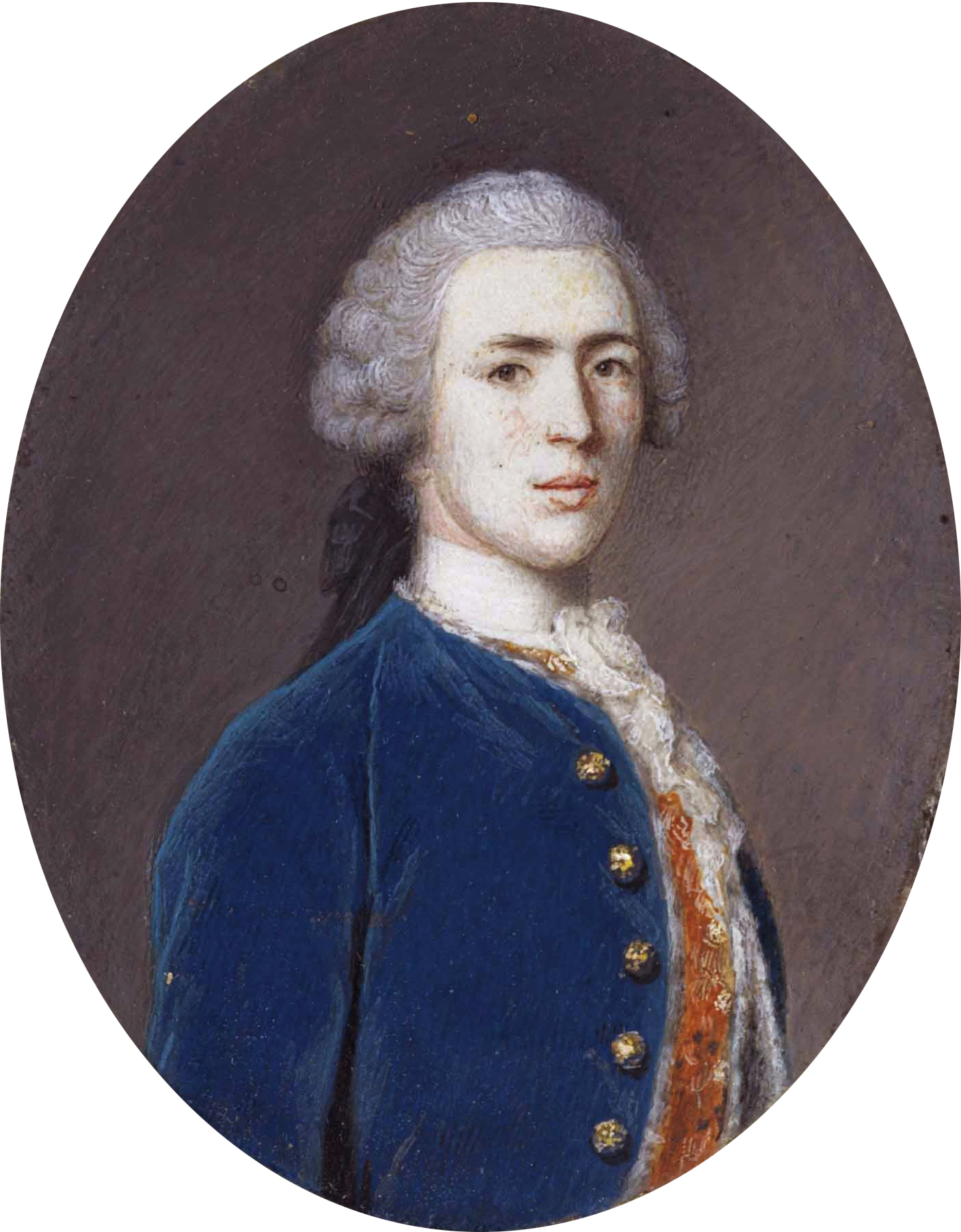
- Portrait by Jean-Étienne Liotard, 1751
- Born: 2 April 1730
- Died: 5 December 1791 (aged 61)
- Parents: Robert Walpole, 2nd Earl of Orford (father); Margaret Rolle (mother)
- Relatives: Walpole family

George Walpole, 3rd Earl of Orford (2 April 1730 – 5 December 1791), was a British administrator, politician, and peer.

== Life ==
Lord Orford was the only child of the 2nd Earl of Orford and his wife Margaret Rolle, who was Baroness Clinton in her own right. His parents separated shortly after his birth. His father's mistress, Hannah Norsa, a celebrated singer and actress at Covent Garden, took up residence at Houghton Hall from 1736 until his father's death in 1751. Orford's mother married again that year and was buried at Leghorn (Livorno) in 1781, "a woman of very singular character and considered half mad".

On his father's death, 31 March 1751, he succeeded as 3rd Earl of Orford. On the death of his mother in 1781 he became the sixteenth Baron Clinton.

An intended marriage to an heiress, Margaret Nicoll, was disrupted by his uncle Lord Walpole of Wolterton. Instead, Margaret married the Duke of Chandos.

Resident at Houghton Hall in Norfolk between 1751 and 1791, he served as High Steward of King's Lynn, recently (but by then no longer) the nation's third-most important port because of the expansion of transatlantic trade from the west coast, and also High Steward of Yarmouth, then a major fishing port. He also served as a Lord of the Bedchamber to King George II until the latter's death, and then to King George III until 1782.

He was Lord Lieutenant of Norfolk from 1757 and took an active part in reforming the county militia in 1758 during the Seven Years' War. He appointed the Hon George Townshend and Sir Armine Wodehouse, 5th Baronet, as the colonels of the West and East Norfolk Regiments respectively. Orford marched at the head of the regiments when they paraded before the King on their way to garrison Portsmouth. Townshend soon resumed his regular army career, and when the militia were next embodied, in 1778 during the American War of Independence when Britain was threatened with invasion by the Americans' allies, France and Spain, Orford took personal command of the West Norfolk Militia. He was an enthusiastic and innovative commander: when the regiment was stationed at Aldeburgh on the Suffolk coast in 1778–9 he rejected unfit men, organised better food supplies, chased smugglers, devised amphibious training exercises and emphasised musketry training rather than parade ground drill.

Orford was a celebrated falconer. He also enjoyed hare coursing and founded Swaffham Coursing Club in 1776, initially with twenty-six members, each naming their greyhounds after a different alphabet letter. For some years it was the leading coursing club in England, holding several meetings a year. He also organised coursing for neighbouring farmers and provided prizes. He became extravagant (his father died probably bankrupt) and increasingly eccentric and eventually died insane. He left no legitimate heirs, having never married, and at his death, aged 61, his titles – except the title of Baron Clinton, which due to its great antiquity had the peculiarity of being able to descend through the female line and passed into the Trefusis family, descendants of Walpole's great-aunt Bridget Rolle (1648–1721) – were passed to his uncle, Horace Walpole, who also took the still heavily encumbered Houghton estate. Walpole is buried in the Church of St Martin at Tours on the Houghton Hall estate.

There is documentary evidence that he had an illegitimate daughter, named Georgina Walpole, whose mother was Mary Sparrow of Eriswell.

== Gross mismanagement and extravagance ==
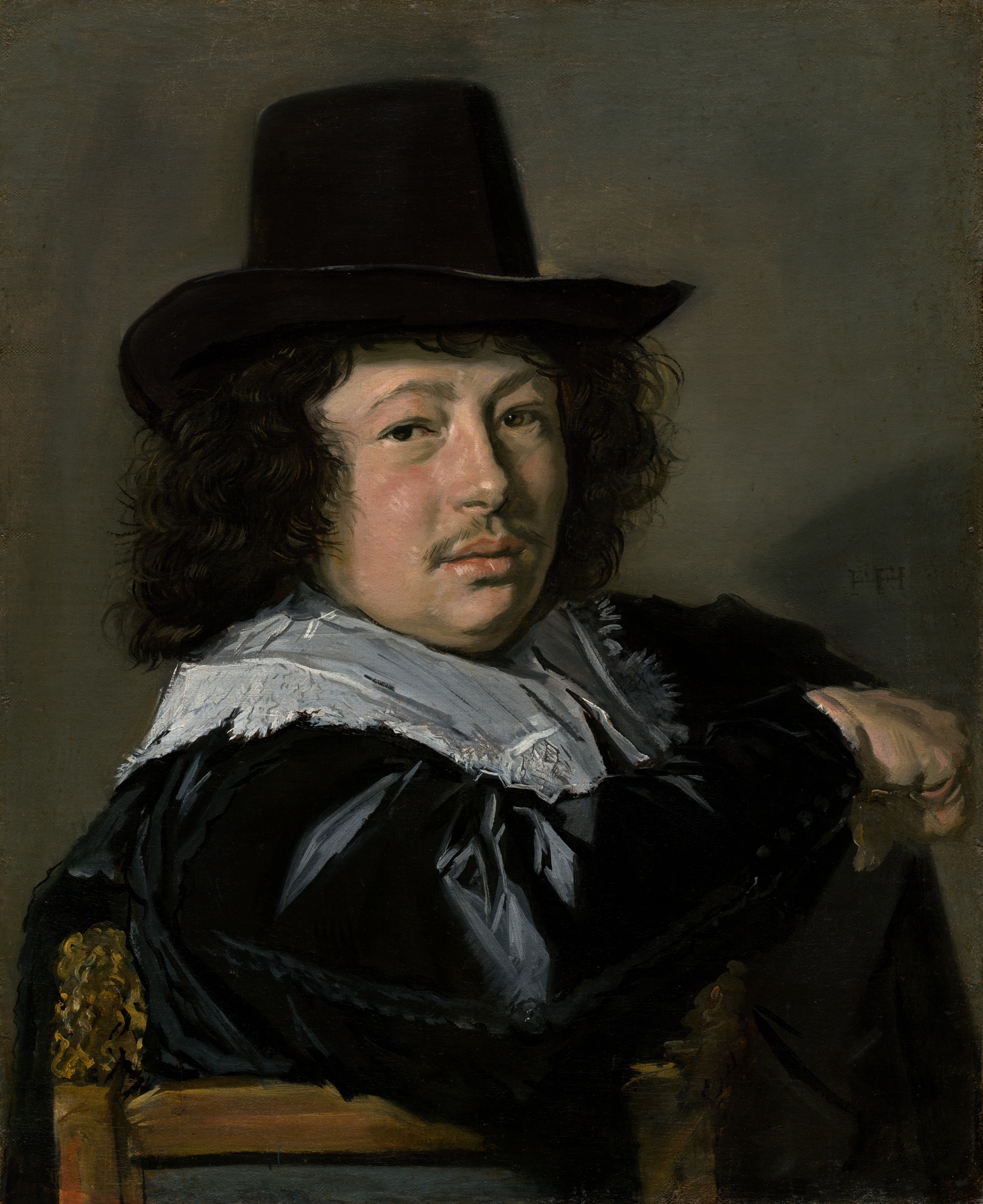
Frans Hals' "Portrait of a young man", an item from Houghton Hall's art collection which Orford sold to Catherine the Great

Orford is particularly remembered for his 1778 sale of his grandfather Robert Walpole's magnificent collection of art to Catherine the Great. It now forms part of the core of the collection at the Hermitage Museum in St Petersburg.

Orford intended his sale of the pictures to have taken place in secrecy but his plan soon leaked out and became of intense interest to the public. The trustees of the British Museum petitioned parliament for their purchase and the erection of a new building to house them. The eventual sale to the Empress of Russia was regarded as a national calamity.

A collection of 204 paintings were received at St Petersburg. Some were sold, mostly during the 1930s, but 126 pictures remain at The Hermitage.

== Arms ==
Coat of arms of George Walpole, 3rd Earl of Orford
Crest The bust of a man in profile couped proper, ducally crowned or, from the coronet flowing a long cap turned forwards gules tasselled and charged with a catherine wheel gold. Escutcheon Or, on a fess between. two chevrons sable, three crosses crosslet of the first. Supporters Dexter, an antelope; sinister, a stag argent, attired proper, each gorged with a collar chequy or and azure chained gold. Motto Fari quæ sentiat (To speak what he feels).

== See also ==
- Robert Walpole, 2nd Earl of Orford
- Horace Walpole, 4th Earl of Orford
- Earl of Orford
- Baron Walpole

Honorary titles
Preceded by The Earl of Buckinghamshire	Vice-Admiral and Lord Lieutenant of Norfolk; 1757–1791	Succeeded by The Marquess Townshend
Peerage of Great Britain
Preceded by Robert Walpole	Earl of Orford; 2nd creation 1751–1791	Succeeded by Horace Walpole
Preceded by Robert Walpole	Viscount Walpole; 1751–1791	Succeeded by Horace Walpole
Preceded by Robert Walpole	Baron Walpole of Houghton; 1751–1791	Succeeded by Horace Walpole
Preceded by Robert Walpole	Baron Walpole of Walpole; 1751–1791	Succeeded by Horace Walpole
Peerage of England
Preceded by Margaret Rolle	Baron Clinton; 1781–1791	Succeeded by Robert Trefusis
