= South Pool =

Village in Devon, England

Coordinates: 50.2480°N 3.7214°W

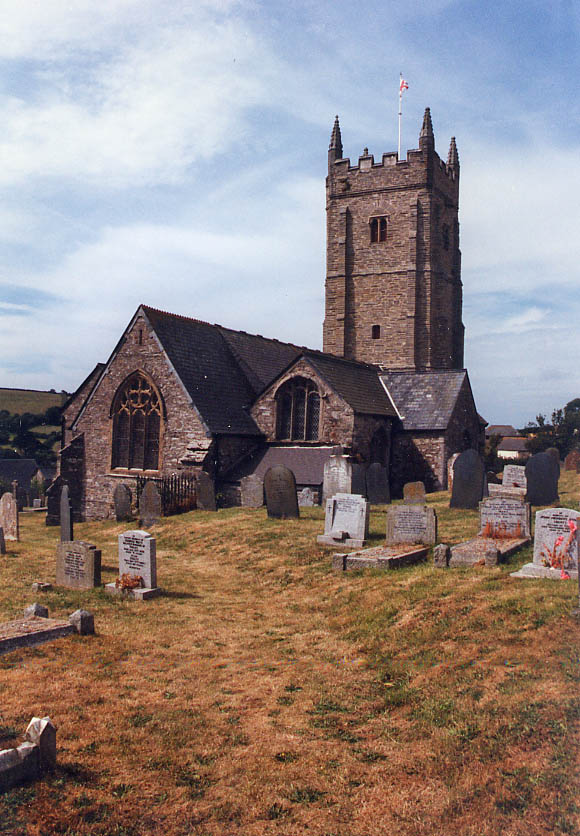
- Parish Church of St Nicholas and St Cyriacus, South Pool

- Location within Devon
- Population: 137 (2021 census)
- Civil parish: South Pool
- District: South Hams
- Shire county: Devon
- Region: South West
- Country: England
- Sovereign state: United Kingdom

South Pool is a village, parish and former manor in South Hams, Devon, England. It is situated 3 1/2 miles south-east of the town of Kingsbridge and 2 1/2 miles north-east of Salcombe. It is administered by the South Hams local authority. Historically it formed part of Coleridge Hundred. It falls within Woodleigh Deanery for ecclesiastical purposes. The village is in an area of outstanding natural beauty at the head of South Pool creek.

== Population ==
The population was 412 in 1801 and 296 in 1901. Population of 137 in 2021. In 1641/2 96 adult males signed the Protestation returns.

== Village ==
The parish church is dedicated to St Nicholas and St Cyriac. The public house is called The Millbrook Inn.

== Transport ==
The nearest transport links are at Frogmore (service 93 between Plymouth and Dartmouth), Kingsbridge (service 164 to Totnes, service 606 to Salcolmbe) and Totnes (train services to/from London Paddington/Plymouth/Penzance/Bristol/Birmingham and the north). Kingsbridge is the nearest town and has a wide selection of shops, including two supermarkets (Morrisons and Tesco).

== Local places of interest ==
Local places of interest are Dartmouth, Salcombe harbour and the creeks towards Kingsbridge and South Pool, the coast path between Bolt Tail, Bolt Head, Prawle Point, Start Point. Salcombe is renowned for sailing, racing taking place regularly, plus a summer regatta. There are many pleasant beaches along this section of the coast path. Slapton Lea near Torcross is a nature reserve.

Southpool was rated as among the "20 most beautiful villages in the UK and Ireland" by Condé Nast Traveler in 2020.

== Historic estates ==
The parish contains various historic estates including:

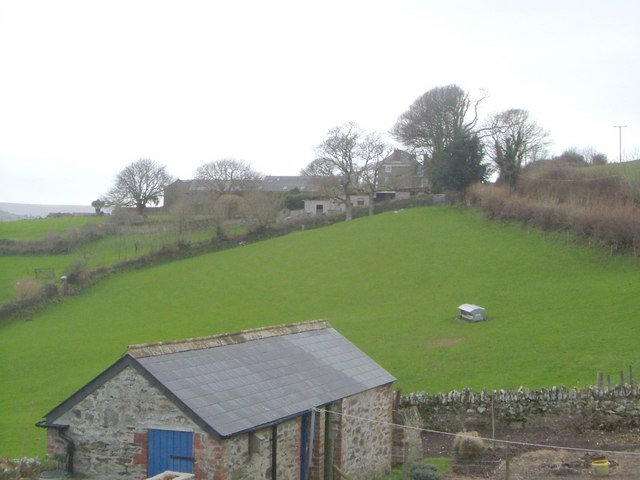
Scoble, viewed from the east

- Scoble (anciently Scobbahull), about 1 mile west of the village, anciently the seat of the de Scobbahull (alias Scobhill, Scobhul, Scobbhull, etc.,) family, whose heir was the Speccot family, of Speccot in the parish of Merton, Devon.

== Notable people ==
- Leonard Darr MP. Resident from 1602 until his death in March 1615.
