= Margaret Rolle, 15th Baroness Clinton =

British heiress (1709–1781)

The Right Honourable The Baroness Clinton
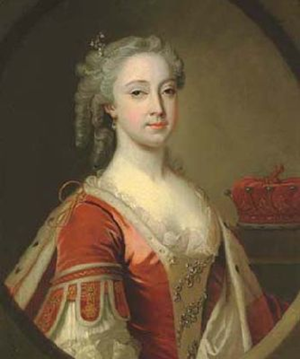
- Margaret Rolle, Baroness Clinton, by John Theodore Heins, matching pair with portrait of her first husband, Lord Orford
- Born: 17 January 1709; England
- Died: 13 January 1781 (aged 71); Pisa, Grand Duchy of Tuscany
- Spouse(s): Robert Walpole (m. 1724, divorced) Sewallis Shirley (m. 1751, separated)
- Children: George Walpole
- Relatives: Robert Rolle (grandfather)

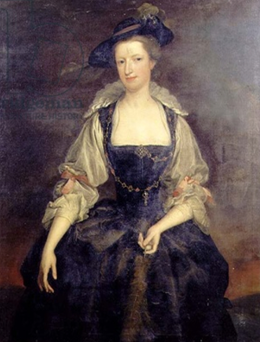
Margaret Rolle, Countess of Orford & suo jure Baroness Clinton (1709–1781) by a follower of Herman van der Mijn. The pose is very similar to the portrait of Lady Frances Finch, wife of Viscount Courtenay by Thomas Hudson

Margaret Rolle, 15th Baroness Clinton suo jure (17 January 1709 – 13 January 1781), was a wealthy British aristocrat, known both for eccentricity and her extramarital affairs.

By her first husband Robert, 1st Baron Walpole, later 2nd Earl of Orford (1701–1751) and eldest son of Sir Robert Walpole, she gave birth to a legitimate heir, George Walpole, 3rd Earl of Orford, who succeeded her in the title of Baron Clinton.

== Family background ==
She was the only surviving daughter and sole heiress of Samuel Rolle, MP (1646–1719), of Heanton Satchville, Petrockstowe, by his second wife, Margaret, daughter of Roger Tuckfield, of Raddon Court, Devon, a junior branch of the Tuckfield family of Little Fulford, near Crediton. The manor of Ashburton, Devon was purchased as a pocket borough for Roger Tuckfield (c. 1685–1739), son of the land-owner of the same name; he bequeathed it to his sister Margaret, and she in turn to her daughter Margaret, subject of this article.

The Rolle family of Heanton Satchville was a wealthy cadet branch of the Rolles of Stevenstone, one of Devon's biggest landowners, descended from George Rolle, MP (d.1552) who acquired lands at the dissolution of the Monasteries. She was also an heiress-in-her-issue of her paternal grandmother, Lady Arabella Clinton, wife of Robert Rolle, MP, High Sheriff of Devon and aunt of Edward Clinton, 5th Earl of Lincoln, 13th Baron Clinton (1645–1692). The earldom of Lincoln had devolved upon her kinsmen who became Dukes of Newcastle.

== Inheritance ==
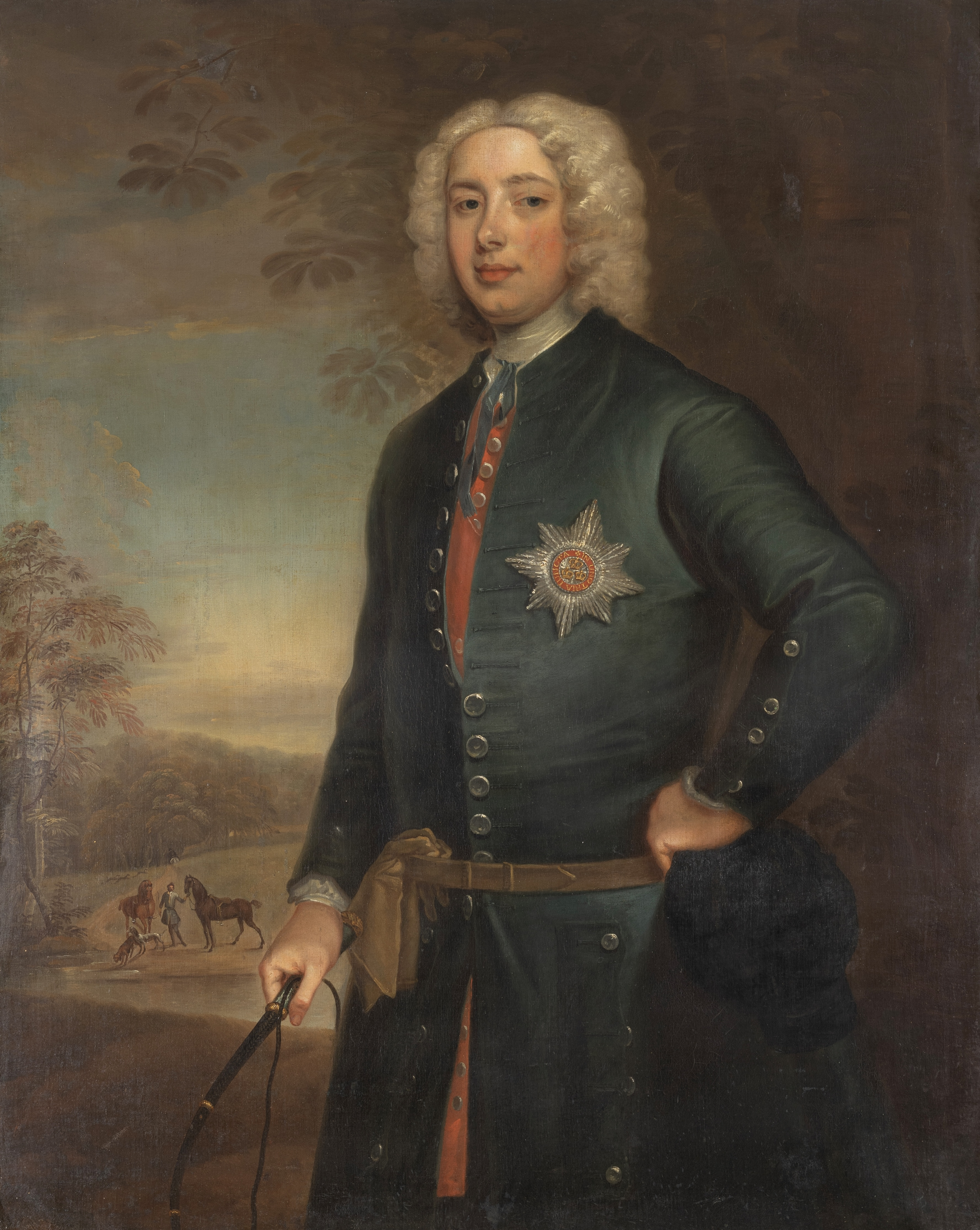
Margaret's first husband, Robert Walpole, 2nd Earl of Orford, portrait attributed to John Wootton, c. 1725

As senior co-heiress to the ancient barony of Clinton, abeyant upon the death in 1751 of her cousin, Hugh Fortescue, 1st Earl Clinton, in 1760 this title was called out of abeyance in her favour by the House of Lords Privileges Committee. Apart from many lucrative manors, she also inherited from her father patronage of the Rolle pocket borough of Callington in Cornwall, to which in 1761 she nominated as MP her Devon agent Richard Stevens (1702–1776), of Winscott, Peters Marland, adjacent to her estate at Petrockstowe, and brother-in-law of a distant cousin, Henry, 1st Baron Rolle (1708–1750).

== Marriages ==
Margaret Rolle married twice:

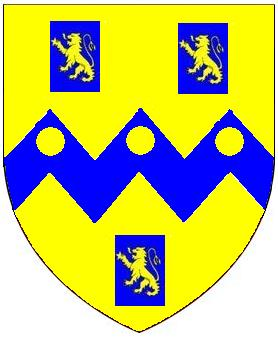
Arms of Rolle: Or, on a fesse dancettée between three billets azure each charged with a lion rampant of the first three bezants

Walpole arms: Or, on a fesse between two chevrons sable three crosses crosslet of the field

- Firstly, in 1724, as a wealthy 15-year-old heiress, to 23-year-old Robert Walpole, 1st Baron Walpole, later 2nd Earl of Orford (1701–1751), eldest son of Sir Robert Walpole, of Houghton Hall, Norfolk (1676–1745), and the first Prime Minister of Great Britain. After the birth of their son she "made it a point ... not to let her husband lie with her and at last stipulated for only twice a week", as reported by Horace Walpole. The marriage was not a success, with her quarrelling violently with his entire family. They lived apart (her later obtaining a legal separation) after the birth of their son and heir:
  - George Walpole, 3rd Earl of Orford, 16th Baron Clinton (1730–1791), who had no legitimate children and died insane.
- Secondly, in 1751, to Hon Sewallis Shirley, MP, 14th son of Robert Shirley, 1st Earl Ferrers. Having previously been his mistress, they lived together in England for a while, and she sponsored his election as MP for Callington in 1754. But this marriage likewise ended in separation, and she returned to Florence in 1755, where she formed a liaison with the Count of Richecourt. Later Shirley became Comptroller of Queen Charlotte's Household.

== Lovers ==
The Countess of Orford eloped to Florence with Samuel Sturgis, Fellow of King's College, Cambridge. In his letters, Horace Walpole (later 4th Earl of Orford) made several mentions of his sister-in-law, mostly disparaging in their nature, as was his norm: "if, like other Norfolk husbands, I must entertain the town with a formal parting, at least it shall be in my own way: my wife shall neither 'run to Italy after lovers and books'..."

Sir Horace Mann, 1st Baronet (1706–1786), HM Resident at Florence, wrote to Horace Walpole: "You are infinitely mistaken in thinking that my lady took the reception ill from her Count. There are pieces of sincerity and freedom that spoil nothing. I hear that he has ordered a very fine chariot, which is to cost 600 crowns, and to be presented to her."

During her second marriage she became involved with Emmanuel de Nay, Comte de Richecourt, Minister of the Imperial Regency Council of Tuscany (1749–1757), originally from Lorraine but who died at Florence in 1768.

== Death ==
Lady Clinton died 1781 at Pisa in Tuscany, and was buried at Leghorn. Her friend, the Countess of Huntingdon (formerly Lady Selina Shirley), later declared that she was "a woman of very singular character and considered half mad."

=== Succession ===
Her son, George Walpole, 3rd Earl of Orford (1730–1791), succeeded as the 16th Baron Clinton, but died without issue; the title of Baron Clinton then became abeyant again, being successfully claimed in 1794 by Robert George William Trefusis, 17th Baron Clinton (1764–1797), a cousin by descent from Margaret's aunt Bridget Rolle (1648–1721).

The heirs male of the 3rd Earl of Orford tried to claim the Heanton Satchville estates, but after a long and complex court case involving the examination of entails made by Sir Samuel Rolle, these lands were adjudged in favour of the Trefusis family.

== See also ==
- Baron Clinton

Peerage of England
In abeyance title last held by Hugh Fortescue	Baroness Clinton; 1760–1781	Succeeded by George Walpole
