= Winscott, Peters Marland =

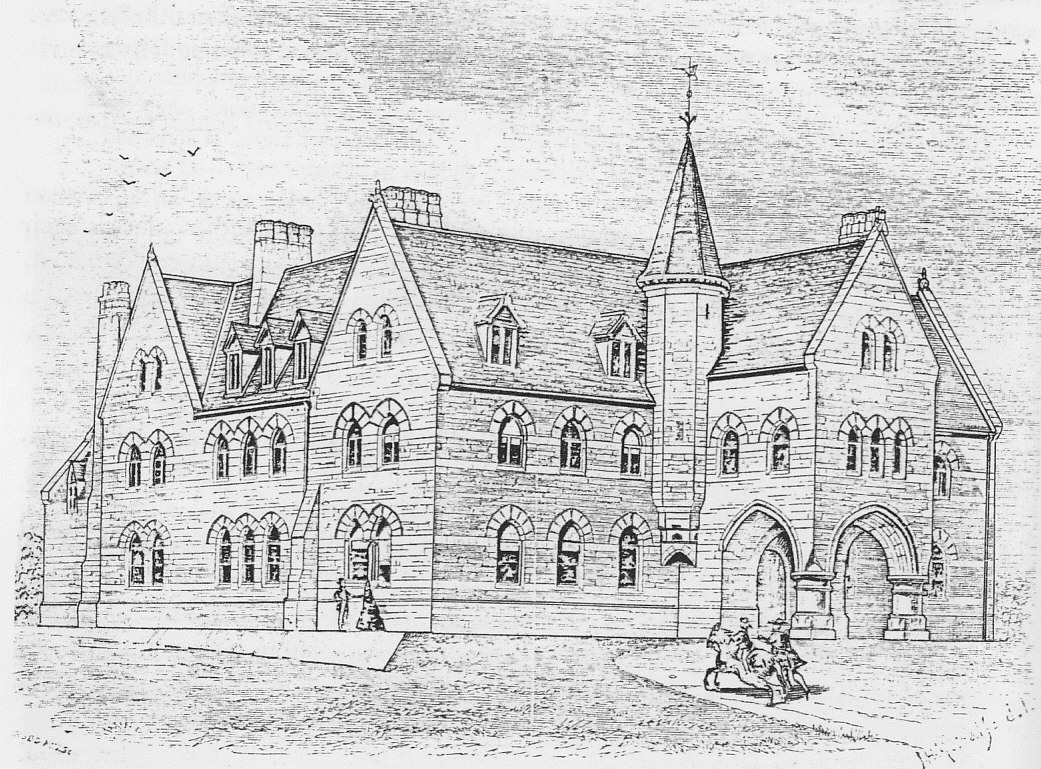
Winscott House, Peters Marland, built in 1865, demolished after 1931

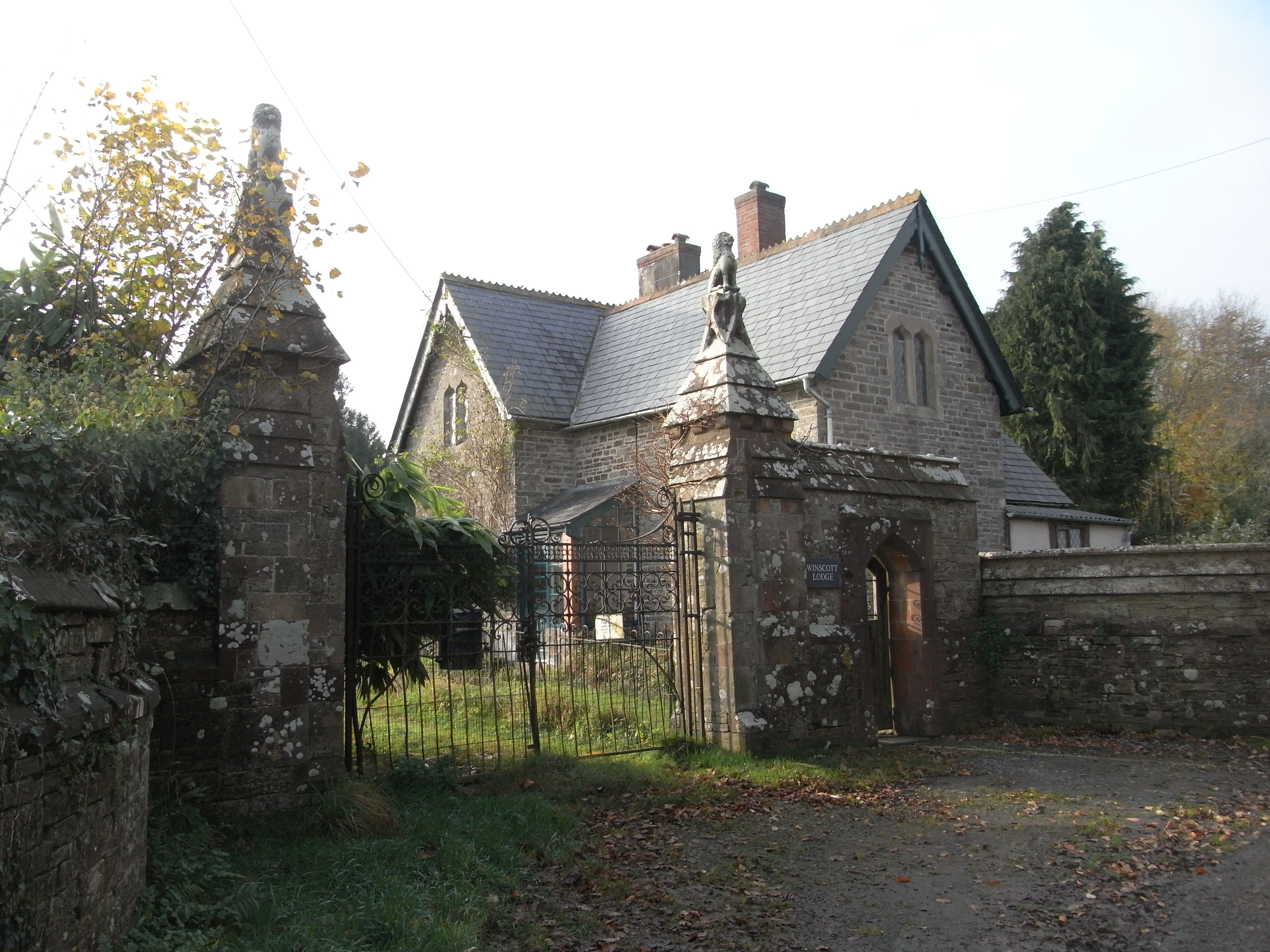
Entrance gates and lodge of the demolished Winscott House

Winscott was a historic manor in the parish of Peters Marland, north Devon, England. Winscott House was built or re-built in 1865 and was demolished after 1931.

Winscott was a seat of the Stevens family also of Velstone, in the parish of Buckland Brewer and Cross, in the parish of Little Torrington, the latter existing today as a large Georgian mansion about 2 miles south of Great Torrington.

== House ==
There must have been a house at Winscott for several centuries – it was the home of the Stevens family, long prominent in Torrington. The family also owned Cross, a large house on the outskirts of that town. The old Winscott property had vanished by October 1865 when plans for a large Victorian mansion for Mr J. C. Moore-Stevens were published in The Builder. The new house was built of local yellow brick from the Marland clay works nearby. Said to have cost over £7,000, the building incorporated a central hall almost 30 feet square. Left empty in 1920, it was finally demolished and all that remains today is a flat area in the middle of a field.

== History ==
=== Domesday Book ===
The Domesday Book of 1086 records the manor of "Winescote" as one of thirty-one manors, including "Mirland" (Peters Marland) and "Tuchbere" (Twigbeare), held by Roald Dubbed. Before 1066 it was held by Alwin.

=== Stevens ===
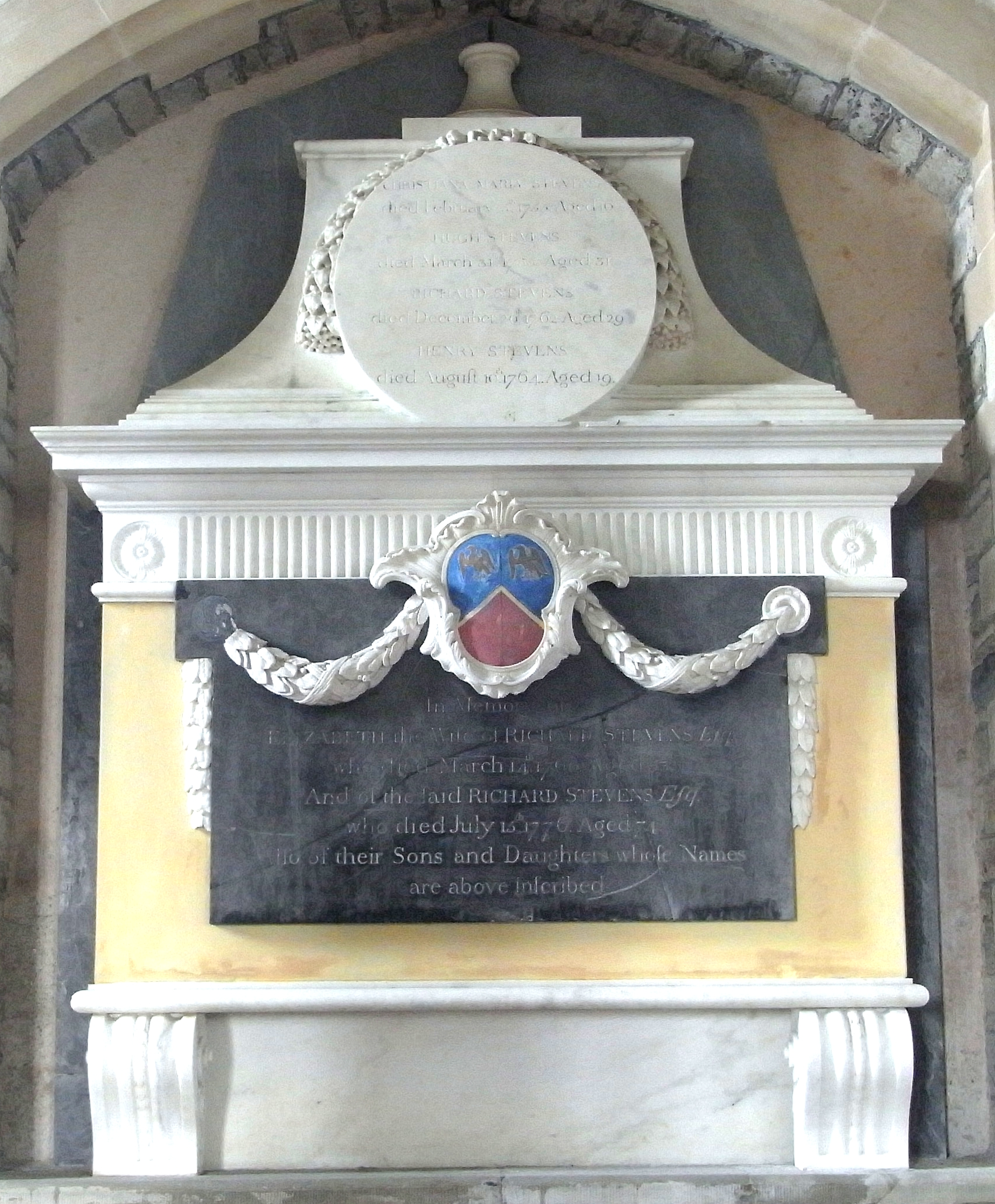
Stevens mural monument in St Peter's Church, Peters Marland

Richard Stevens (1702-1776)

Richard Stevens (1702-1776) of Winscott, was MP for Callington in Cornwall. His mural monument exists in Peters Marland Church. He married Elizabeth (1707-1760), of unknown family, by whom he had three sons who pre-deceased him without children and two daughters who were also without children. His daughter Elizabeth Stevens (1727-1792) married twice, firstly to Robert Awse, and secondly in 1782 to John Clevland (1734-1817) of Tapely, MP for Barnstaple 1766-1802.

Thomas Moore-Stevens (1782-1832)

Thomas Moore-Stevens succeeded to Winscott under the will of Elizabeth Clevland, He adopted the name and arms of Stevens, by royal licence dated 12 July 1817, on the death of John Clevland, as a condition of his wife's will. According to the death notices in the 1832 Annual Register, Thomas Moore-Stevens died by suicide.

John Curzon Moore-Stevens (1818-1903), JP, DL.

He was the son and heir of Thomas Moore-Stevens and was MP for North Devon and High Sheriff of Devon in 1870. He rebuilt Winscott in 1865, immediately following his inheritance, at a cost of over £7,000. He served as a Justice of the Peace and Winscott House was built with its own "Justice Room" with a separate entrance and lobby.

He also rebuilt the nave and chancel of St Peter's Church, Peters Marland, in 1865, also to the designs of William White.

Richard Moore-Stevens (1854-1931)

Col. Richard Arthur Moore-Stevens (1854-1931), was the son and heir of John Curzon Moore-Stevens. In 1886 he married his third cousin May Clare Sophy Haworth. They had three children: John (born 1900), Ralph (born 1904) and Joyce. A very religious man, he disinherited his son for marrying a Roman Catholic. He shut up Winscott House in around 1920 and moved to Exeter.

=== Sale of estate ===
Some time after Richard Arthur Moore-Stevens died, the Winscott estate was sold. A timber merchant purchased the grounds and felled the trees, whilst the building firm of Chambers of Winkleigh purchased the house, which was eventually demolished without a trace surviving above ground. Some materials were used to construct a new village hall. A few specimen trees survive, but all traces of the orchard, terraces, tennis court and walled garden have vanished. The imposing entrance gates and lodge survive.
