= Achilles (opera) =

Opera by John Gay

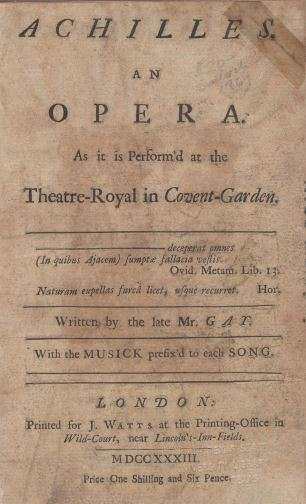
Title-page of the libretto of John Gay's ballad-opera Achilles, published 1733

Achilles is a ballad opera by John Gay, first performed at the Theatre Royal, Covent Garden in 1733, a year after Gay's death, with Gay's associate John Rich as producer.

== Background ==
The opera is a burlesque parody of the story of Achilles on Skyros, based on legends of Achilles as related by Bion, Ovid, and Statius (notably the latter's Achilleid). Unsuccessful attempts were made at the time to interpret the work as a political satire (as was Gay's The Beggar's Opera) but no convincing case has been made for this. Unlike The Beggar's Opera and Gay's other ballad opera, Polly, Achilles uses not only tunes from popular music, but also employs melodies from concertante works of Arcangelo Corelli. Achilles proved popular; the first performance alone brought John Rich over £200, and the opera ran for over a month after its premiere on 10 February 1733.

== Roles ==
Role	Voice type	Premiere cast, 10 February 1733
Lycomedes, king of Scyros		James Quin
Achilles		Thomas Salway
Ulysses		Mr. Chapman
Thetis		Mrs. Buchanan
Deidamia		Hannah Norsa
Theaspe, wife of Lycomedes		Mrs. Cantrel

== Synopsis ==
The opera takes place on the isle of Skyros, (called "Scyros" in the libretto). Achilles is disguised by his mother the goddess Thetis as Pyrrha, a woman, in an attempt to prevent him going to Troy, where she is convinced he will die. However, he falls in love with Deidamia, the daughter of the island's king, Lycomedes. Various misunderstandings follow, including an attempt by Lycomedes to rape "Pyrrha". Lycomedes's wife, Theaspe, seeks to dispose of "Pyrrha" by marrying "her" to her nephew Periphas; at which Achilles complains "I have no sooner escap'd being ravish'd but I am immediately to be made a Wife". Deidamia becomes pregnant, and Ulysses recognizes Achilles. The truth is out and Achilles and Deidamia marry; Achilles then leaves to take part in the Trojan Wars.
