= Sewallis Shirley (1709–1765) =

British Member of Parliament

Sewallis Shirley (19 October 1709 – 31 October 1765) was a British Member of Parliament in the latter part of the reign of George II. His marriage to the Dowager Countess of Orford ended in divorce after three years, and Shirley spent the last few years of his life as an officer of Queen Charlotte's household.

== Personal life ==
He was born the fourteenth son of Robert Shirley, 1st Earl Ferrers (and fourth son by his second wife, Selina). Robert Shirley, MP was his brother.

Shirley was a noted rake, including amongst his lovers the notorious Lady Vane. In 1746, he began cohabiting with his mistress, Margaret, Countess of Orford, whom he married on 25 May 1751, shortly after the death of her long-estranged husband, the 2nd Earl of Orford. After three years of close attachment, they separated in June 1754. Margaret had taken care to legally protect her own estates and jointure, so that Shirley could have no claims on her property. Shirley's persistent and aggressive demands for money ensured that the rupture would be permanent, although she ultimately settled £750 per year on him to extinguish his claims. An attempt by Sir Horace Mann to bring about a reconciliation between them in 1758 was unsuccessful. They had no children.

== Politics ==
Shirley entered Parliament in 1742 at Brackley, on the interest of the 1st Duke of Bridgewater, who had withdrawn his support from George Lee after the latter accepted office in the Carteret Ministry. He followed his patron in backing the opposition under Robert Walpole. After the death of Bridgewater in 1744 and the transfer of the Brackley interest to Sir Richard Lyttelton, who married Bridgewater's widow in 1745, Shirley conformed with Lyttelton's politics to support Henry Pelham's ministry. From 5 July to 14 November 1746, he was Chief Secretary for Ireland under Lord Chesterfield, then Lord Lieutenant.

At the election of 1754, he was returned for Callington on his wife's interest, and was identified as a Tory. By the 1761 election, the two were separated, and Margaret put up one of her agents, Richard Stevens, in Shirley's place; he did not again sit in Parliament. In 1762, he was appointed comptroller of the household to Queen Charlotte, a post which he filled until his death in 1765.

Political offices
| Preceded by Richard Liddell | Chief Secretary for Ireland; 1746 | Succeeded by Edward Weston |
Parliament of Great Britain
| Preceded by Sir Paul Methuen; George Lee | Member of Parliament for Brackley; 1742–1754; With: Sir Paul Methuen 1742–1747; Sir Richard Lyttelton 1747–1754 | Succeeded by Marshe Dickinson; Thomas Humberston |
| Preceded by Hon. Horace Walpole; Edward Bacon | Member of Parliament for Callington; 1754–1761; With: John Sharpe 1754–1756; Fane William Sharpe 1756–1761 | Succeeded by Fane William Sharpe; Richard Stevens |
