= Peters Marland =

Village and civil parish in Devon, England

Coordinates: 50°53′N 4°10′W

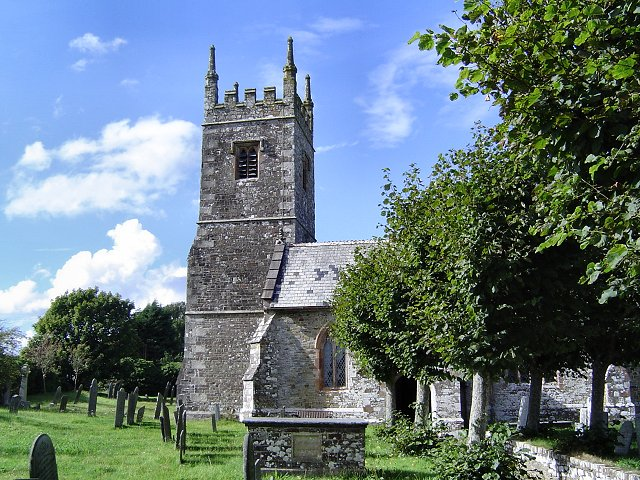
The parish church of St Peter

Peters Marland is a small village and civil parish in the local government district of Torridge, Devon, England. The parish, which lies about four miles south of the town of Great Torrington, is surrounded clockwise from the north by the parishes of Little Torrington, Merton, Petrockstowe, Buckland Filleigh, Shebbear and Langtree. In 2001 its population was 234, down from the 286 residents it had in 1901.

In 1850 the parish was recorded as covering 2,200 acres with 351 parishioners. At that time most of the land within the parish belonged to Rev. John Moore-Stevens (died 1865), Archdeacon of Exeter, whose son was living at Winscott House in the parish; much also belonged to G. Oldham of Twigbear. Both Winscott and Twigbear are former manors that have their origins before the Norman Conquest, as also are Week and Winswell in the parish.

The parish church, in the village, is dedicated to St Peter. It was extensively restored in the 1860s by the Moore-Stevens family and is, according to W. G. Hoskins, "entirely without interest".

== Industry ==
Ball clay is quarried in the east of the parish, as it has been for many years. There was a brick and tile works here until 1940; many houses in Great Torrington are built of its cream-coloured bricks. The North Devon and Cornwall Junction Light Railway served the works between 1925 and 1982. Today the former railway line forms part of the Tarka Trail series of footpaths and cycle tracks.
