= Scoble, South Pool =

Historic estate in south Devon, England

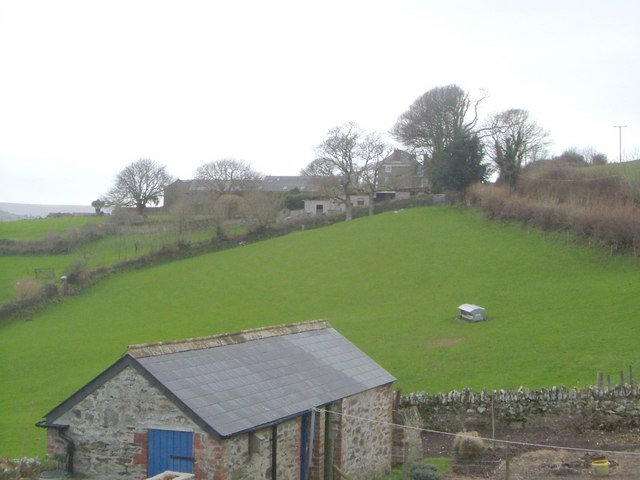
Scoble, viewed from the east

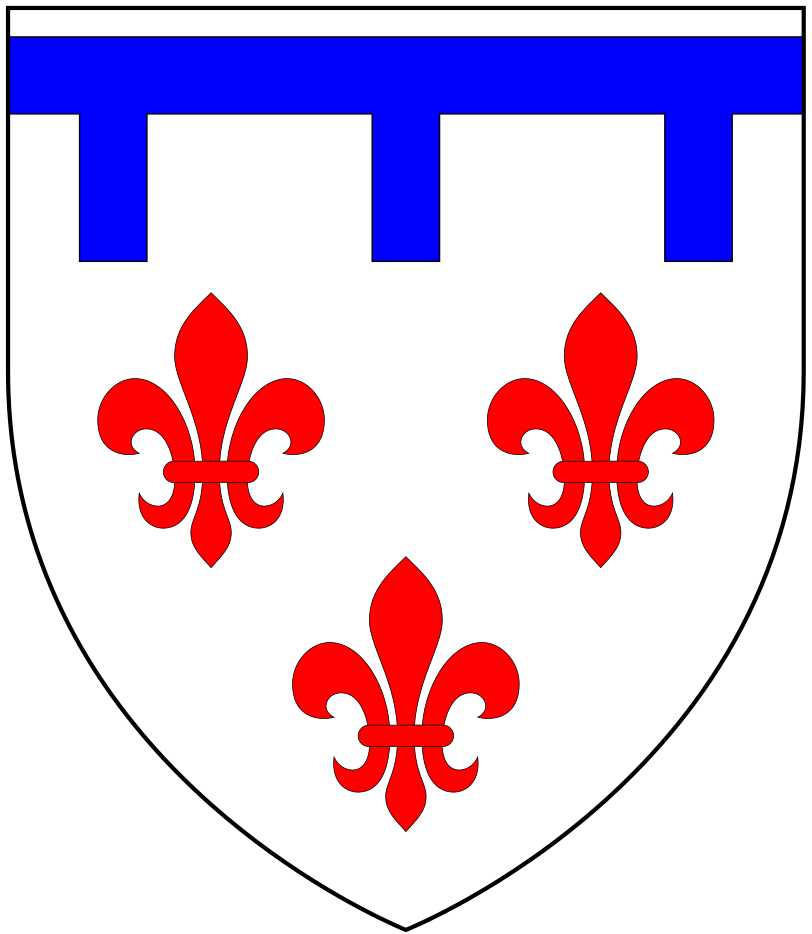
Arms of de Scobahull of Scobahull: Argent, three fleurs-de-lys gules a label of three points azure As visible in East Ogwell Church and in St John's Church, Paignton

Scoble (anciently Scobbahull), is an historic estate in the parish of South Pool near the south coast of Devon, England. The present Scoble House, located about 1 mile west of the village of South Pool, is a Grade II* listed building built circa 1720–40, probably around a more ancient core, with early 19th c. additions. It is a "tall stone house in a remote position" which represents a "slightly provincial, but nonetheless interesting example of an early - mid 18th century gentleman's house which has a remarkably complete interior and has not suffered from any extreme C20 modernisation."

== Descent ==
=== de Scobbahull ===
From the reign of King Henry III (1216–1272) until that of King Henry V (1413–1422) the estate was the seat of the de Scobbahull (alias Scobhill, Scobhul, Scobbhull, etc.,) family, which had taken its surname from its seat. The last in the male line was Sir Robert Scobbahull, also lord of the manor of Coffinswell, who by his wife Elinor (if unrecorded family) left three daughters and heiresses:

  - Joane Scobbahull, heiress of Coffinswell, wife of William Holbeame of Holbeame in the parish of West Ogwell, son of John Holbeame (born 1351). Their son and heir was John Holbeame (born 1407–1429). The arms of Holbeame impaling Scobbahull survive sculpted in stone on a pier in the Church of East Ogwell.
  - Isabell Scobbahull, heiress of the estate of Scobbahull, wife firstly of Thomas Chedder, secondly of Nicholas Speccot, of Speccot in the parish of Merton, to whose son John Speccot (d.1460) the estate of Scobbahull descended.
  - Elizabeth Scobbahull, wife firstly of William Trebell and secondly of Robert Kirkham (d.1443) of Blagdon, Paignton in Devon, by whom she had issue. The arms of Kirkham quartering Scobbahull survive in the Kirkham Chantry of St John's Church, Paignton.

=== Speccot ===
The estate of Scobbahull descended to the Speccot family of Speccot in the parish of Merton, on the marriage of Isabell Scobbahull, a daughter and co-heiress of Robert Scobbahull.
