= Hannah Norsa =

English Jewish actress and singer

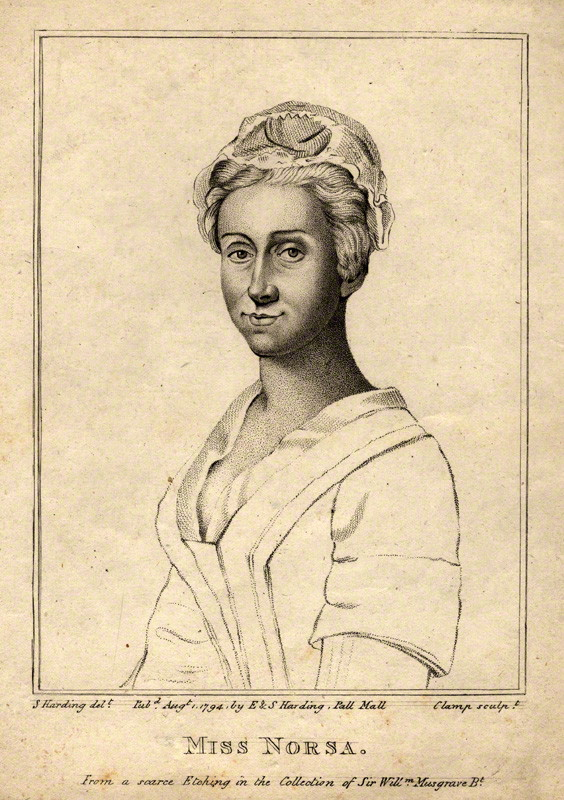
Hannah Norsa by R. Clamp, after Bernard Lens (III), stipple engraving, published 1794

Hannah Norsa (first name sometimes spelt Hanna; c. 1712 – 28 August 1784) was an English Jewish actress and singer, who achieved fame appearing in John Gay's The Beggar's Opera in 1732 and became the mistress of Robert Walpole, 2nd Earl of Orford.

== Life ==
Norsa was the daughter of the London innkeeper Issachar Norsa, an Italian Jew from Mantua. She created a sensation at her stage debut in the character of Polly Peachum at the revival of The Beggar's Opera at the Covent Garden Theatre on 16 December 1732, and over the next few years took leading roles in operas by Johann Ernst Galliard and others. In 1733 she sang the part of Deidamia in Gay's posthumously performed ballad opera Achilles. She also undertook non-singing roles in plays including George Farquhar's The Beaux' Stratagem and The Orphan by Thomas Otway.

By 1736 she had come under the wing of Robert Walpole, the son and heir of the former Prime Minister Robert Walpole and brother of the writer Horace Walpole. Horace described Norsa as "my brother's concubine." Robert's marriage had broken up in a formal separation, and Norsa went to live with him, moving (when he succeeded to the peerage as Earl of Orford in 1745) to Houghton Hall in Norfolk. A local clergyman's wife wrote of her in 1749 "She is a very agreeable Woman, & Nobody ever behav'd better in her Station, She have every body's good word, and bear great Sway at Houghton, She is every thing but Lady, She came here in a Landau & Six horses & ... a young Clergyman with her." Norsa had a son with Orford, born in 1740, who apparently died young. The music historian David Conway considers Norsa's story "an archetypal tale of how stage stardom might lead to social transformation."

Norsa stayed with Orford until his death in 1751 having apparently financed his extensive debts. In his will Orford asked that his successor "take care that Mrs Norsa have her judgment well served to her." After 1751 she was taken in by the producer of The Beggar's Opera, John Rich and his family. When she died in Kensington she was quite prosperous, leaving £3,400 in investments in Treasury stock. She was buried at St Mary Abbots, Kensington, on 28 August 1784.
