= Hugh Fortescue, 1st Earl Clinton =

English peer and landowner

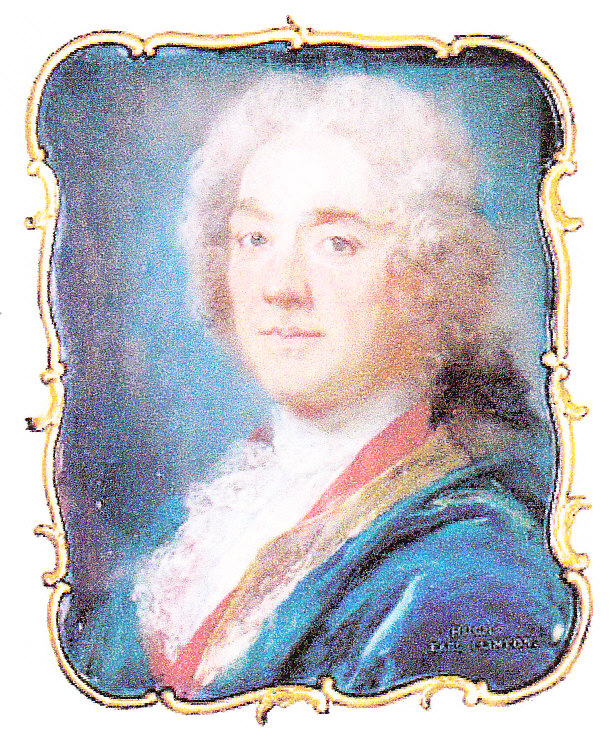
Hugh Fortescue, 1st Earl Clinton

Arms of Fortescue: Azure, a bend engrailed argent plain cotised or

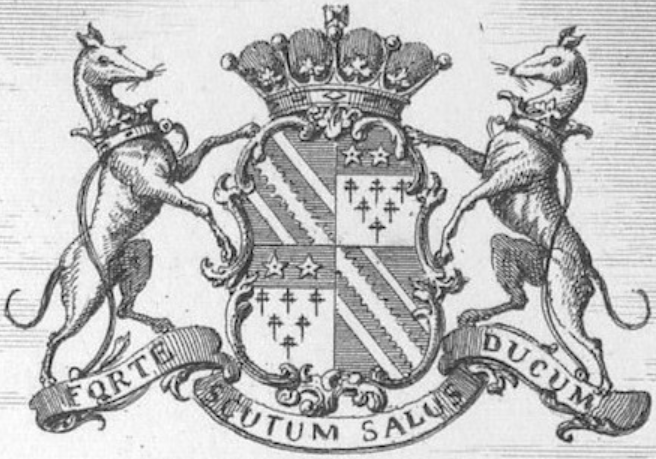
Arms of Hugh Fortescue, 1st Earl Clinton: Fortescue quartering Clinton (Argent, six cross crosslets fitchée sable three two and one on a chief azure two mullets or pierced gules), detail from a contemporary engraving of Castle Hill (see below)

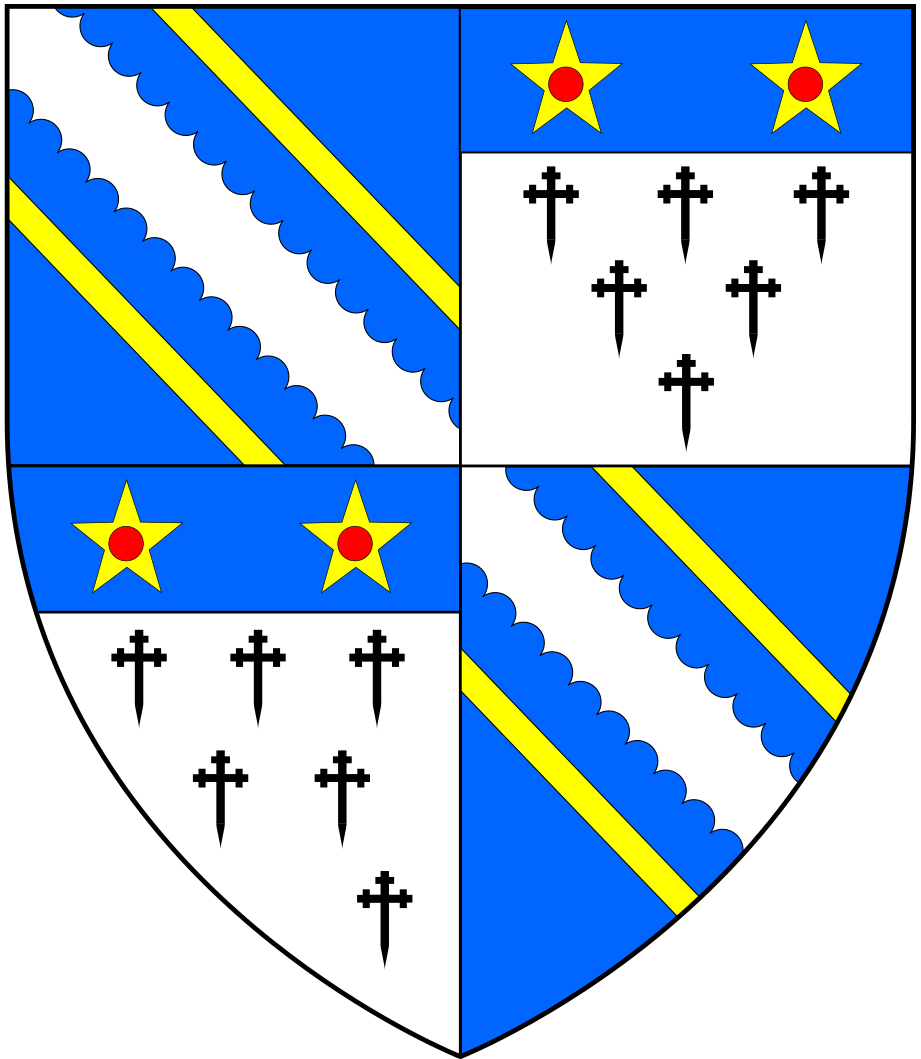
Arms of Hugh Fortescue, 1st Earl Clinton: Fortescue quartering Clinton

Hugh Fortescue, 1st Earl Clinton (c. 1696 – 3 May 1751) was an English peer and landowner. He built the Palladian English country house of Castle Hill, which survives to this day.

== Origins ==
He was the eldest surviving son and heir of Hugh Fortescue, MP (1665–1719) of Filleigh, Weare Giffard and Ebrington, by his first wife Bridget Boscawen (d. 1708), daughter and sole heiress of Hugh Boscawen, MP (1625–1701), of Tregothnan in Cornwall (whose mother was a Rolle), by his wife Lady Margaret Clinton (d. 1688), the youngest daughter and eventual co-heiress of Theophilus Clinton, 4th Earl of Lincoln, 12th Baron Clinton (1600–1667). Bridget Boscawen's first cousin was Hugh Boscawen, 1st Viscount Falmouth (c. 1680-1734), Comptroller of the Household and Vice-Treasurer of Ireland, raised to the peerage in 1720. From the Boscawens the Fortescue family inherited various estates in Cornwall including antimony mines at Treore and also possessed Trewether and the harbours at Port Gaverne and Port Isaac.

== 14th Baron Clinton ==
On the death of his mother's childless first cousin Edward Clinton, 5th Earl of Lincoln, 13th Baron Clinton (d.1692) (grandson and heir of Theophilus Clinton, 4th Earl of Lincoln, 12th Baron Clinton (1600–1667)), the title Baron Clinton went into abeyance until it was terminated in 1721 in favour of Hugh Fortescue, who thus became 14th Baron Clinton. He also inherited Tattershall Castle in Lincolnshire, the Clinton seat, which was retained by the Fortescue family until 1910.

== Career ==
On 16 March 1721 he was summoned to the House of Lords as Baron Clinton and in the same year was appointed by King George I as Lord Lieutenant of Devon. In 1723 he was appointed a Gentleman of the Bedchamber to the Prince of Wales (the future King George II). In 1725 he was made a Knight of the Bath also by King George I. Having previously been a supporter of Prime Minister Walpole, in 1733 he voted against his Excise Bill, which having faced substantial opposition failed to pass, and was dismissed from his royal posts as Gentleman of the Bedchamber to King George II and Lord Lieutenant of Devon, as were also dismissed from their posts two dukes, four earls and two barons who had similarly defied Walpole. Following Walpole's resignation in 1742, Fortescue's career recovered and on 5 July 1746 he was elevated to the peerage as Baron Fortescue of Castle Hill (with special remainder) and Earl Clinton.

== Estates ==
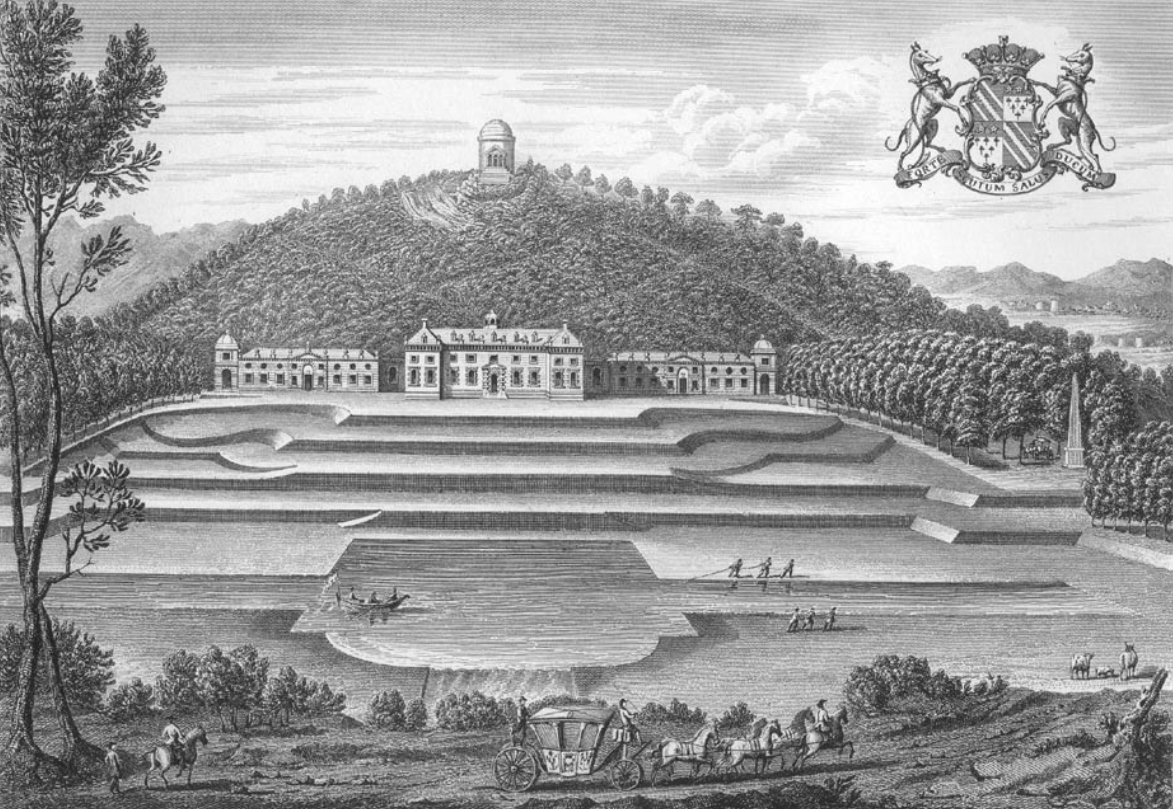
Castle Hill, Filleigh, Devon, as built by Hugh Fortescue, 1st Earl Clinton, whose arms, quartering Clinton, are shown at top right

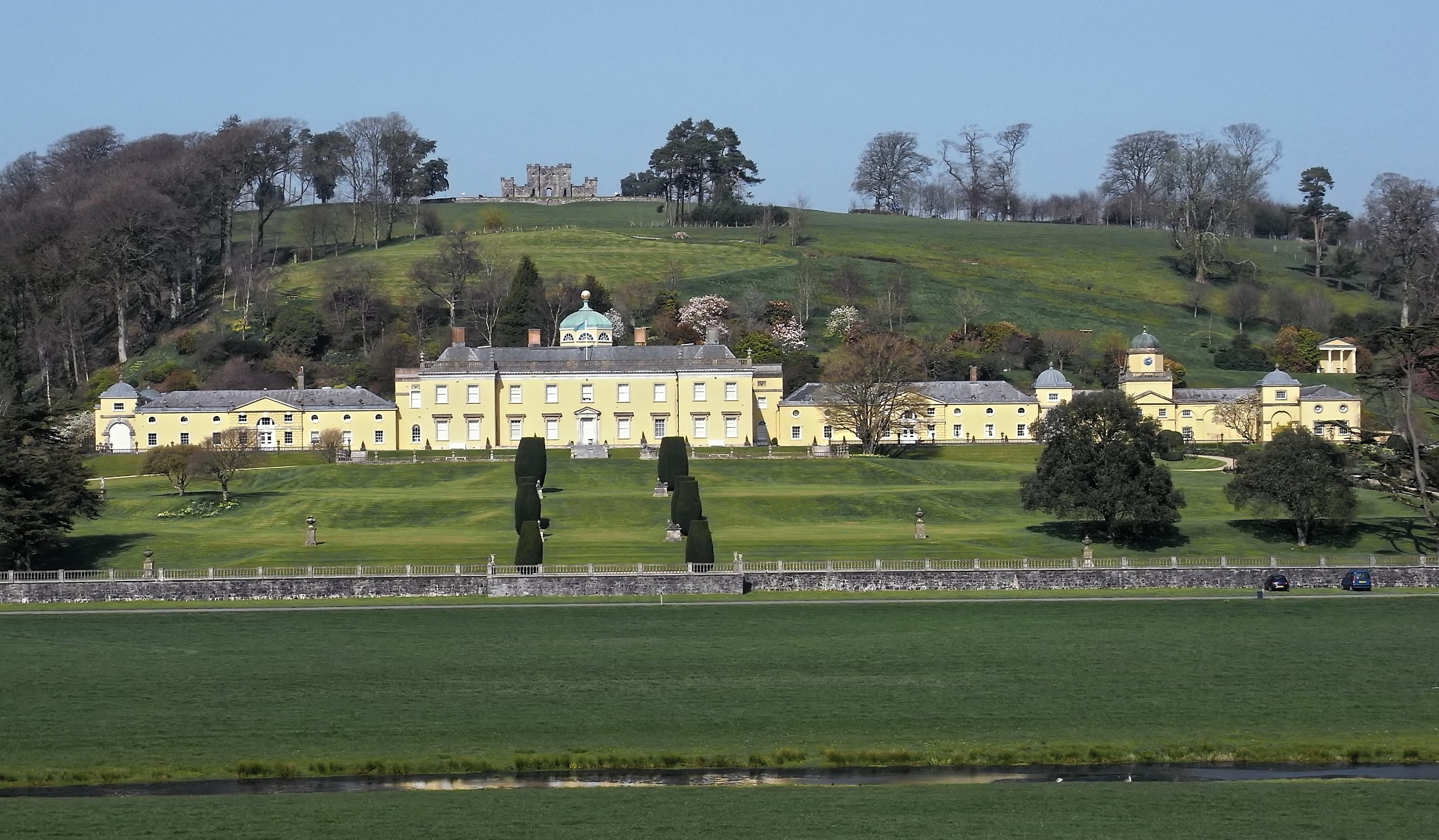
Castle Hill in 2014

He consolidated his estates by selling most of his holdings in Somerset and Wiltshire and reinvesting the proceeds of £22,000 in purchasing more land in the vicinity of his North Devon manor of Filleigh, inherited from his father, where he demolished the ancient manor house and built in its place the surviving Palladian stately home which he named Castle Hill.

== Personal life ==
He died unmarried on 3 May 1751, aged 55, although he had fathered a daughter by a mistress, for whom he built a house on his Filleigh estate. The illegitimate daughter married one of his cousins.

== Succession ==
As he died without legitimate issue, the Earldom of Clinton became extinct and the Barony of Fortescue descended to his younger half-brother, Matthew Fortescue, 2nd Baron Fortescue (1719–1785) in accordance with the special remainder. The ancient barony of Clinton, which had been created by writ in 1298, went into abeyance until 1760 between his childless sister Margaret Fortescue (1693-1760), who styled herself "Baroness Clinton", and their second cousin Margaret Rolle (1709–1781), who in 1760 became 15th Baroness Clinton, the daughter of Col. Samuel Rolle (1646-1719), the son of Robert Rolle (d. 1660), MP, of Heanton Satchville, Petrockstowe, Devon, by his wife Lady Arabella Clinton, the younger daughter of Theophilus Clinton, 4th Earl of Lincoln, 12th Baron Clinton (1600–1667). Margaret Rolle was then the widow of Robert Walpole, 2nd Earl of Orford (d. 1751) (son of the Prime Minister Robert Walpole) and the wife of Sewallis Shirley, son of Robert Shirley, 1st Earl Ferrers.

Honorary titles
Preceded by The Lord Carteret	Lord Lieutenant of Devon; 1721–1733	Succeeded by The Lord Walpole
Peerage of Great Britain
New creation	Earl Clinton; 1746–1751	Extinct
New creation	Baron Fortescue; 1746–1751	Succeeded by Matthew Fortescue
Peerage of England
In abeyance Title last held by Edward Clinton	Baron Clinton; 1721–1751	In abeyance Title next held by Margaret Rolle
