= Robert Walpole, 2nd Earl of Orford =

British politician (1701–1751)

The Right Honourable The Earl of Orford KB
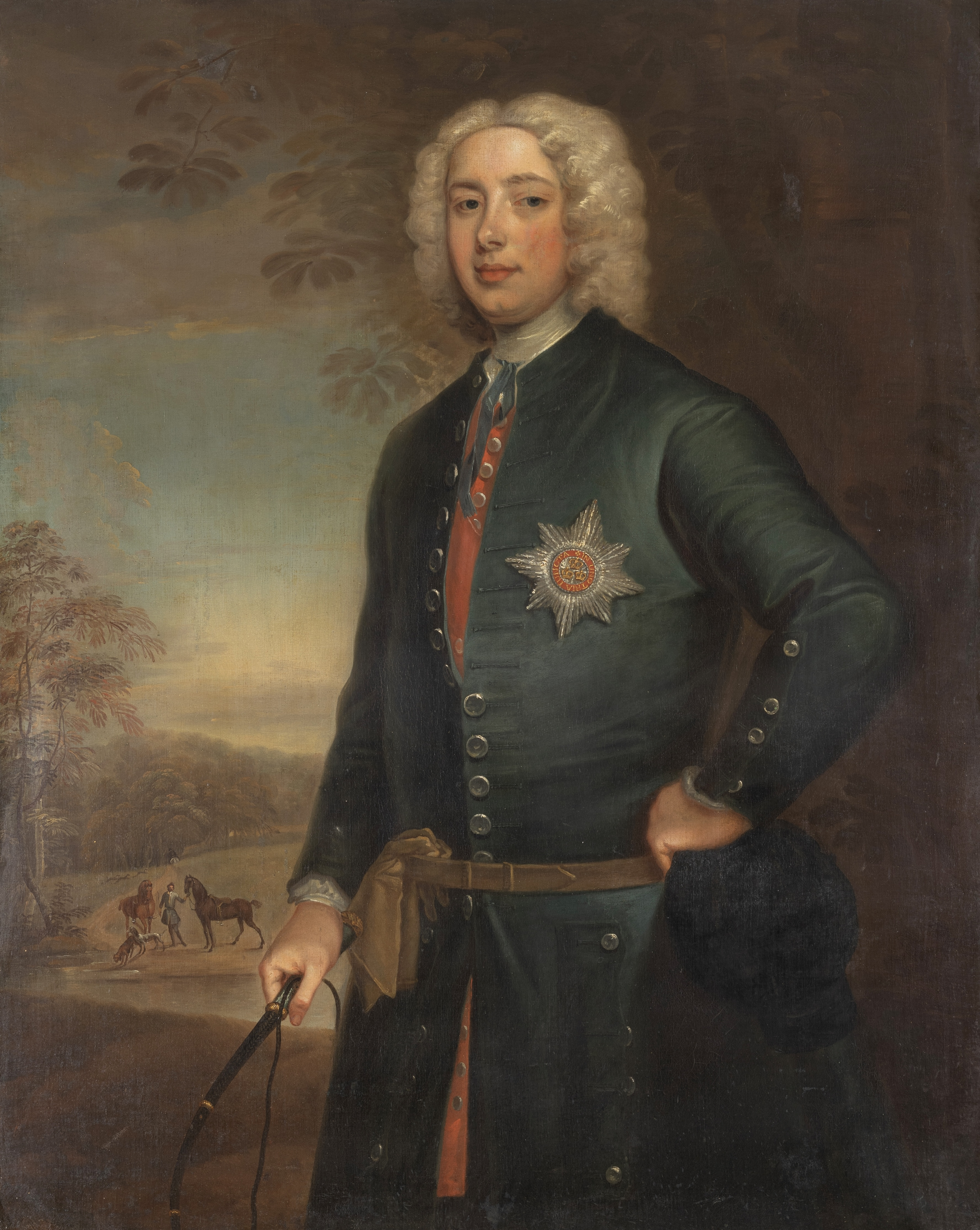
- Portrait attributed to John Wootton, c. 1725
- Born: 1701
- Died: 31 March 1751 (age 49–50)
- Spouse: Margaret Rolle (m. 1727; div. 1730)
- Partner: Hannah Norsa (1736–1751)
- Children: George Walpole
- Parents: Sir Robert Walpole (father); Catherine Shorter (mother)
- Relatives: Walpole family George Townshend

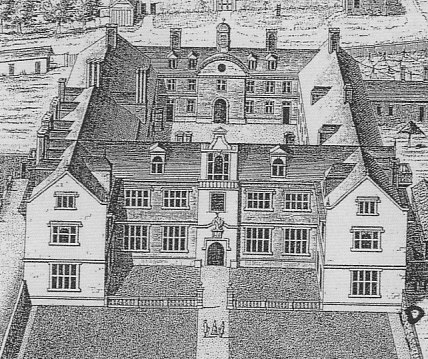
Heanton Satchville depicted in 1739, the inheritance of Margaret Rolle who had by then been estranged for three years from Walpole; detail from engraving in Vitruvius Britannicus with caption:"Heanton Hall and Park in Devonshire, the Seat of the Right Hon.ble Robert Lord Walpole Ld. Lieutenant of the County of Devon and Knight of the Most Hon.ble Order of the Bath"

Robert Walpole, 2nd Earl of Orford, KB (1701 – 31 March 1751), styled Lord Walpole from 1723 to 1745, was a British politician.

== Origins ==
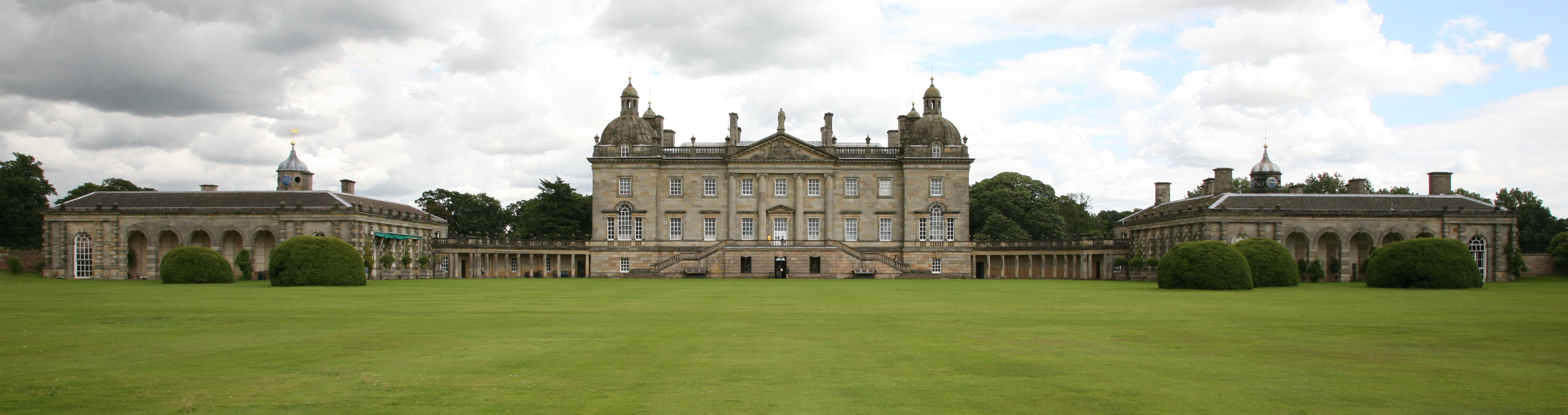
Houghton Hall, Norfolk

He was the eldest son of Sir Robert Walpole (1676–1745), the King's First Minister, now regarded as the first British Prime Minister, by his first wife Catherine Shorter. In 1723 his father declined a peerage for himself but did accept the offer on behalf of his 22-year-old son Robert who was thus raised to the peerage as Baron Walpole, of Walpole in the County of Norfolk.

== Marriage ==
Circa 26 March 1724 Lord Walpole married the 15-year-old heiress Margaret Rolle (1709–1781), the only surviving daughter of Colonel Samuel Rolle (1646–1719), of Heanton Satchville, Petrockstowe. Margaret was the heiress to a junior branch of the great Rolle family of Stevenstone in Devon and to her paternal grandmother, born Lady Arabella Clinton, an aunt and co-heiress of her nephew Edward Clinton, 5th Earl of Lincoln and 13th Baron Clinton (d. 1692).

The marriage was not a success and Lady Walpole quarrelled violently with his whole family. After one son was born they lived apart and later obtained a legal separation.

In 1736 Hannah Norsa, a leading singer and actress at Covent Garden, moved to Houghton Hall in Norfolk and remained there as Walpole's mistress until his death in March 1751. Her financial support may have saved him from dying bankrupt. In Walpole's many absences Hannah Norsa was escorted in her landau and six horses by his chaplain, Rev William Paxton, who received the position as a small part of the Walpole family compensation for his father's defence of Walpole's father, the Prime Minister.

His estranged widow became the 15th Baroness Clinton succeeding in her own right after the death of her cousin Hugh Fortescue, 1st Earl Clinton. She had remarried on Walpole's death but soon separated from her second husband, Hon Sewallis Shirley, a son of the 1st Earl Ferrers and Comptroller of Queen Charlotte's Household. Lady Clinton died at Pisa, in Tuscany, in 1781, and was buried at Leghorn, "a woman of very singular character and considered half mad" (according to her friend, Selina, Countess of Huntingdon). Walpole himself is buried in the Church of St Martin at Tours on the Houghton Hall estate.

== Progeny ==
Both the Earl of Orford and his wife Baroness Clinton were succeeded in all their titles by their son George Walpole, 3rd Earl of Orford and 16th Baron Clinton (1730–1791), a celebrated falconer, who left no legitimate children and died insane.

== Career ==
Robert Walpole held the following posts at some time between 1701 and 1751:

- Clerk of the Pells (1721–1739)
- Auditor of the Receipt of the Exchequer (1739–1751)
- Ranger of Richmond Park
- High Steward of Yarmouth
- Lord Lieutenant of Devon (1733–1751)

== Arms ==
Coat of arms of Robert Walpole, 2nd Earl of Orford
| Crest The bust of a man in profile couped proper, ducally crowned or, from the coronet flowing a long cap turned forwards gules tasselled and charged with a catherine wheel gold. Escutcheon Or, on a fesse between two chevrons sable three crosses crosslet of the field Supporters Dexter, an antelope; sinister, a stag argent, attired proper, each gorged with a collar chequy or and azure chained gold. Motto Fari quæ sentiat (To speak what he feels). Orders The Order of the Bath - Knight Companion (KB). |

== Notes ==
- Kidd, Charles; Williamson, David, eds. (1990). Debrett's Peerage and Baronetage. New York: St Martin's Press.
- Leigh Rayment's Peerage Pages
- thepeerage.com

Honorary titles
| Preceded by Henry Pelham | Clerk of the Pells; 1721–1739 | Succeeded by Sir Edward Walpole |
| Preceded by The Lord Clinton | Lord Lieutenant of Devon; 1733–1751 | Succeeded by The Duke of Bedford |
| Preceded by The Earl of Halifax | Auditor of the Exchequer; 1739–1751 | Succeeded by The Earl of Lincoln |
Peerage of Great Britain
| Preceded by Robert Walpole | Earl of Orford; 2nd creation 1745–1751 | Succeeded by George Walpole |
| Preceded by Robert Walpole | Viscount Walpole; 1745–1751 | Succeeded by George Walpole |
| Preceded by Robert Walpole | Baron Walpole of Houghton; 1745–1751 | Succeeded by George Walpole |
| New creation | Baron Walpole of Walpole; 1723–1751 | Succeeded by George Walpole |
