= Cross, Little Torrington =

Historic estate in Devon, England

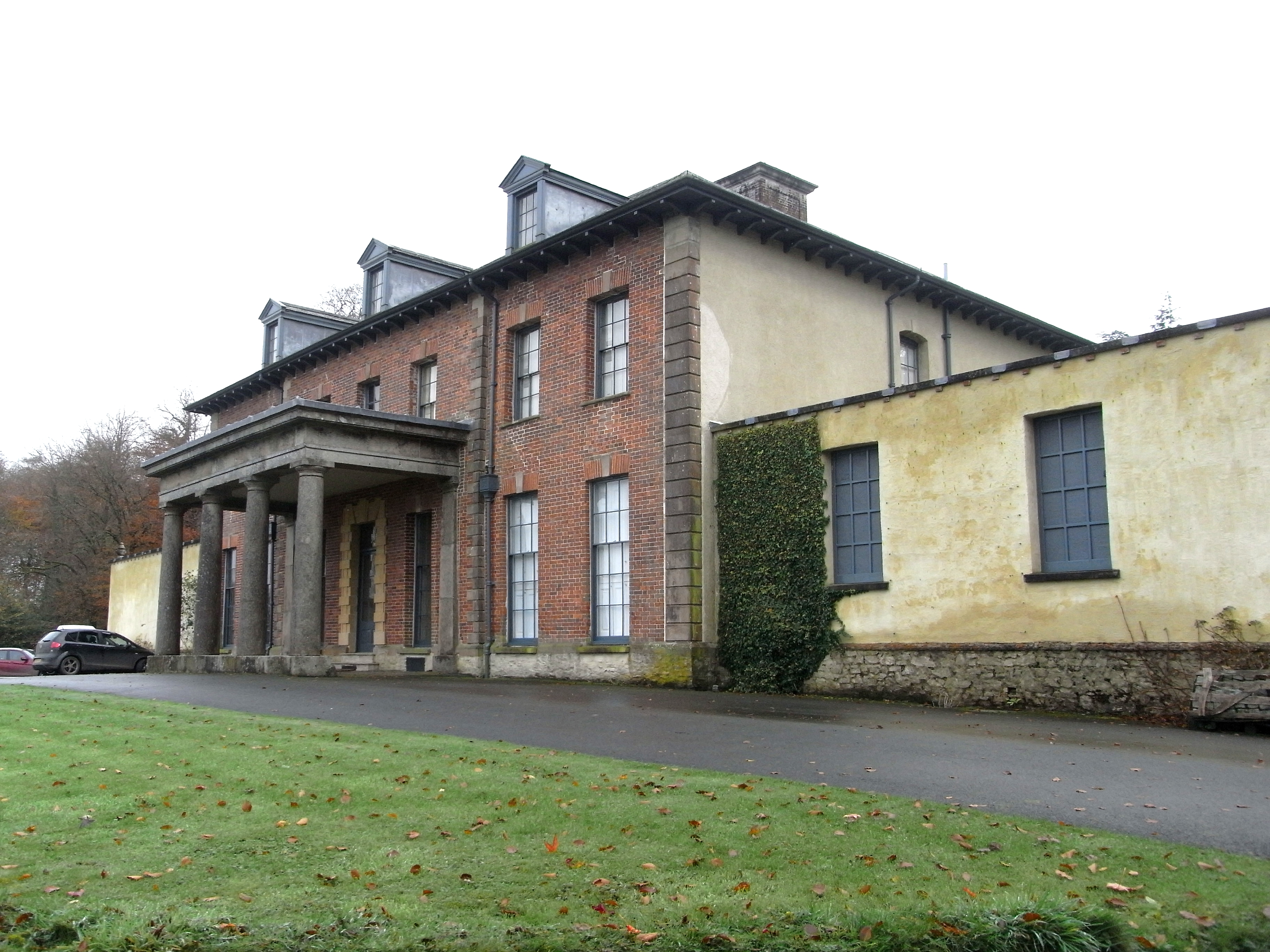
Cross House, Little Torrington

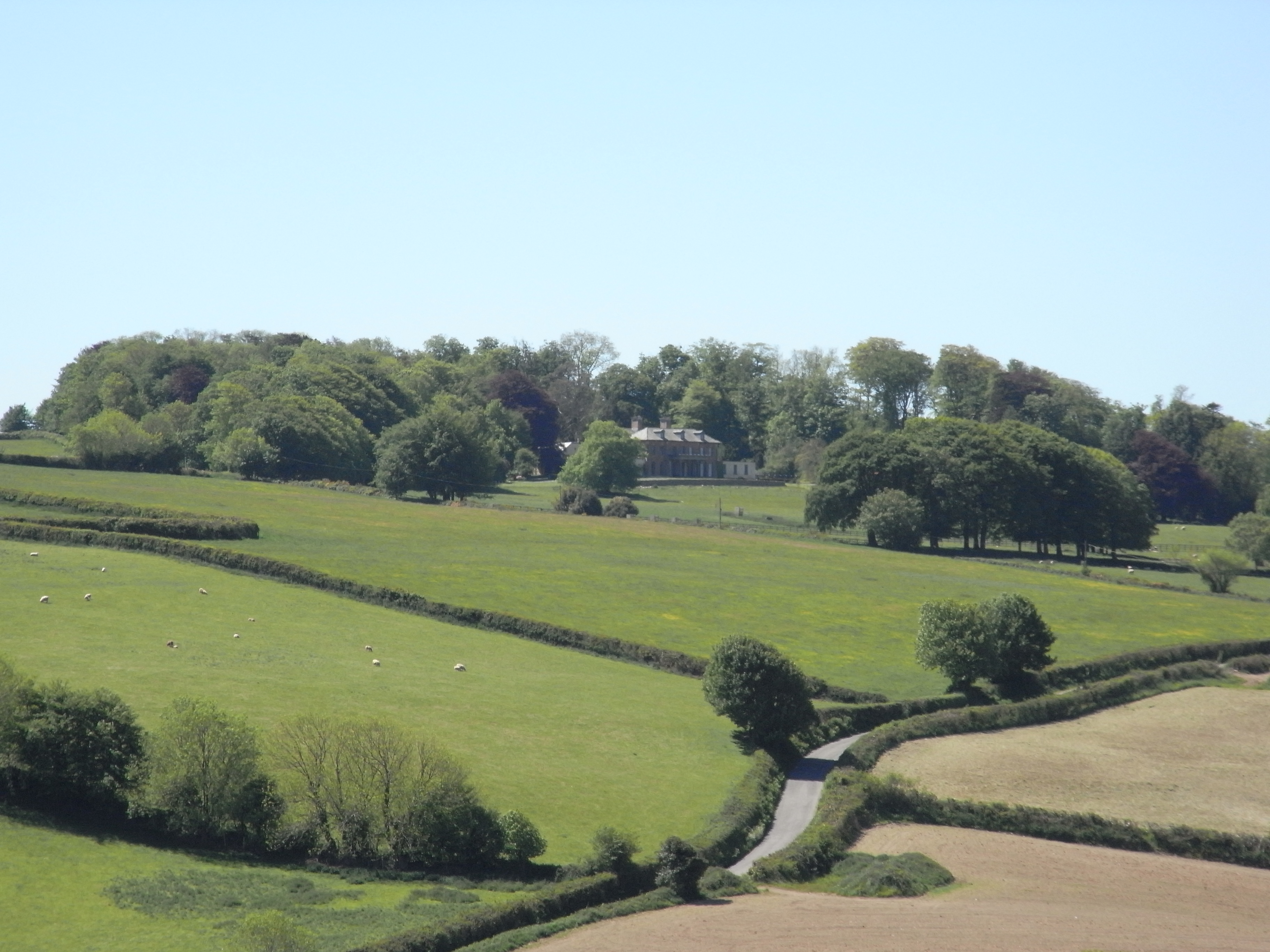
Cross House, Little Torrington, viewed from across the valley of the River Torridge on Castle Hill, Great Torrington

Cross is a historic estate in the parish and former manor of Little Torrington, Devon. The Georgian red-brick mansion house at Cross, re-built between 1744 and 1748 and classified as Grade II* listed in 1960, is a conspicuous sight from Castle Hill, Great Torrington, across the River Torridge valley. Cross House is especially notable as containing an ornate staircase salvaged in about 1720 from the demolished Stowe House, Kilkhampton in Cornwall, built circa 1680-5.
