= Little Torrington =

Village in Devon, England

Coordinates: 50.931009°N 4.148862°W

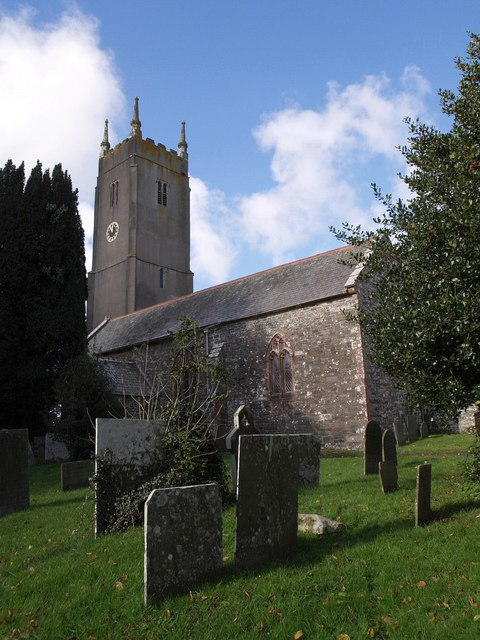
- St Giles Church, Little Torrington

- Location within Devon
- Population: 376 (2011 Census)
- District: Torridge
- Shire county: Devon
- Region: South West
- Country: England
- Sovereign state: United Kingdom
- Post town: Torrington
- Postcode district: EX38
- Police: Devon and Cornwall
- Fire: Devon and Somerset
- Ambulance: South Western

Little Torrington is a village and a civil parish near Great Torrington, in the Torridge district, north Devon, England. In 2001 the population of the civil parish of Little Torrington was 420 and in 2011 it was 376, according to census data. Little Torrington has the Church of St Giles and the Chapel of St Mary Magdalene.

In the 1870s, Little Torrington was described as follows:

"A bridge over the river Torridge, at Taddyport village, connects the parish with Great Torrington. The living is a rectory in the diocese of Exeter. Value, £397. Patrons, the Heirs of Lord Rolle and others. The church is ancient but good."

== History ==
Little Torrington was originally a Saxon settlement called Toritona, held by Edmer Ator during the reign of Edward the Confessor between 1042–1066.

At the time of the Norman Invasion of England in 1066, Alweard the Red was lord and tenant. By 1086 Little Torrington was considered a large settlement for its time with 33 households. It had a new overlord, Count Rotbert of Mortrain, the uterine half-brother of William the Conqueror. The local tenant-in-chief was also from the Norman elite, Aluredus le butuiller (Alfred the Butler).

The first vicar for the church was recorded in 1259, although the current church of St Giles was created in the 15th century. Renovations have taken place on the church throughout its time. The first major renovation took place in 1755, when it was re-roofed in a Georgian style. In 1857, the nave and south aisle were restored, the western gallery removed, and the chancel rebuilt and enlarged. Finally, in 1898, restoration work was carried out on the tower, and a tower screen and new pews were added to the interior of the church.

Little Torrington, along with Great Torrington, had a significant role in the English Civil War; the Battle of Torrington in 1646 marked the end of Royalist resistance in the region.

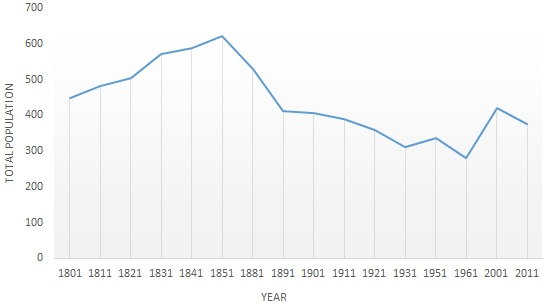
Population of Little Torrington

The population of Little Torrington fluctuated between 1801 and 2011 according to census data. In 1801 it was 449, and from then the population continued to grow, reaching a peak of 623 residents in 1851. The population then fell and reached its lowest recorded level of 281 in 1961. The population in 2011 had recovered to 376 people.

== Industry ==
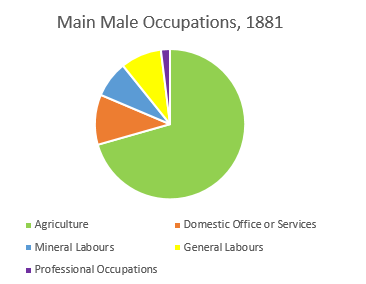
Breakdown of the main occupations males in Little Torrington worked in according to the 1881 census.

The first census divided the working men into two different categories, those "chiefly employed in agriculture" and those "chiefly employed in trade, manufacturers or handicraft". This increased to nine categories in 1831, with the majority of Little Torrington's men aged 20 and over working in agriculture.

Breakdown of the main occupations females in Little Torrington worked in according to the 1881 census.

The 1881 census showed more work categories for both men and women. Agriculture remained the main industry for men, and dressmaking for women; the second largest category for both genders was domestic and office services.

As of 2011, 189 of 376 Little Torrington residents were employed. The highest areas of employment were agriculture, forestry, fishing and manufacturing.

== Geography ==
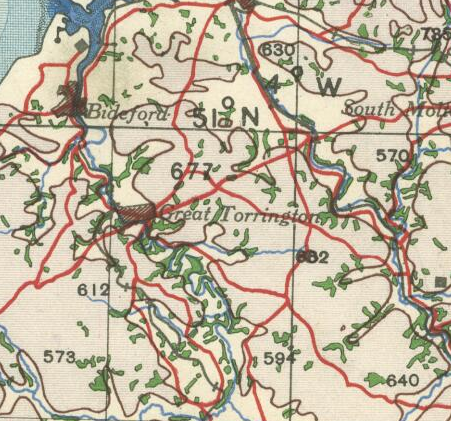
A historical 20th century map, from the British War Office, showing Little Torrington, Devon

The village is located east of the A386, contains "2880 acres of land, including the village of Taddiport, on the south-west side of the river Torridge opposite Great Torrington."

"Taddiport is a hamlet beside the Torridge, which is here crossed by a massive three-arched bridge, possibly of 17th century date. A chapel, attached to a leper hospital founded in the 13th century, still remains, though considerably altered."

The majority of current residents, according to the 2011 census, live in whole houses or bungalows, 106 households live in detached properties and 55 households live in semi-detached properties, with only 2 households living in flats or apartments.

Out of all the current residents 189 are economically active and 70 are retired. The majority of these 178 households contain 2 people, 85 households, 51 households only have 1 person and only 14 households contain 4 people.

According to the 2001 census age structure indicators, they found out of the 420 people living in Little Torrington in 2001, 112 are aged 45–59, 71 are aged 30–44, 29 are aged 75–84 and only 12 are aged 5–7.

There are 342 residents aged 16 or over, 99 of these residents have no formal qualifications, 41 have GCSEs or equivalent, 45 have A-Levels or equivalent and 78 have degrees or equivalent as their highest level of qualification.

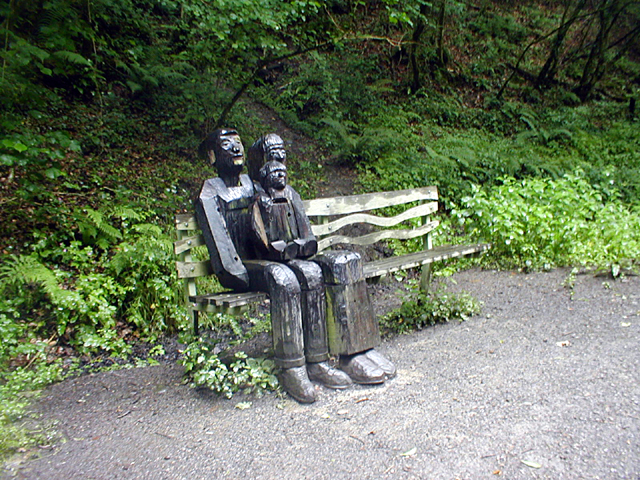
Tarka Trail

== Transport ==
Little Torrington is connected by various bus services including those going to Barnstaple and Exeter.

The closest railway station is in Chapelton, 10 miles from Little Torrington, part of the First Great Western line which connects to Barnstaple, Exeter and Plymouth.

== Historic estates ==
- Cross, Little Torrington
