= Edmund Tremayne =

English conspirator & civil servant (c.1525–1582)

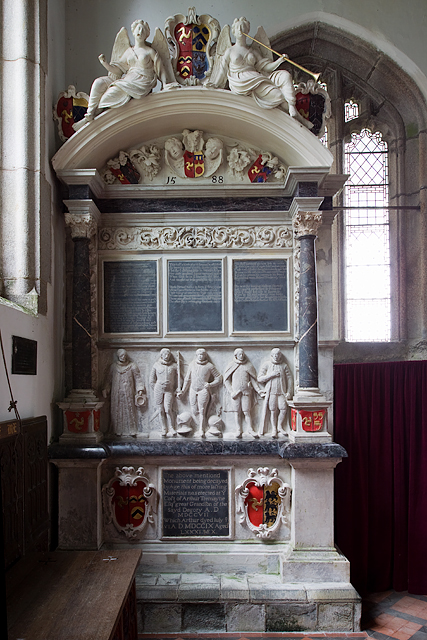
Monument in Lamerton Church, Devon, to Edmund Tremayne and four of his brothers, erected in 1588 by his 5th brother Degorie Tremayne

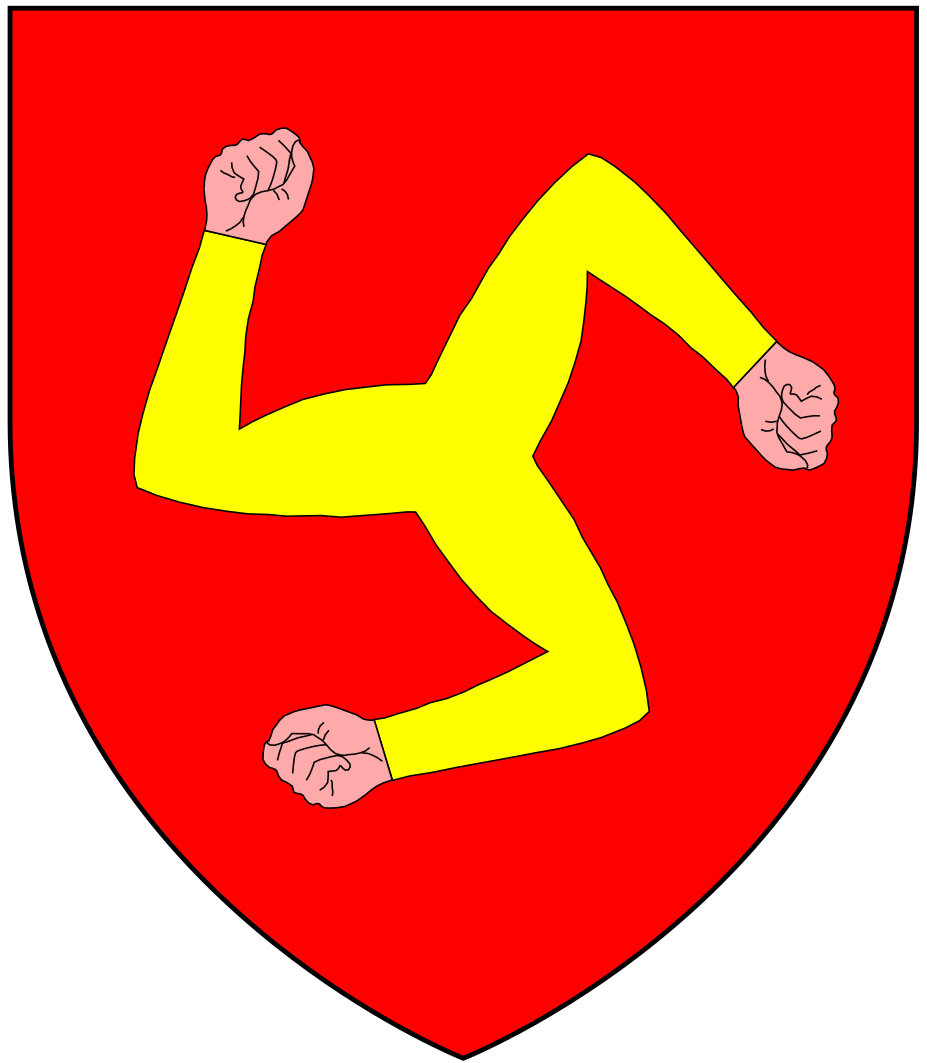
Canting arms of Tremayne: Gules, three dexter arms conjoined at the shoulders and flexed in triangle or the fists clenched proper

Edmund Tremayne (c. 1525–1582) was an English conspirator and official. He was dedicated to Protestant causes, in opposition to the policy of the Catholic Queen Mary Tudor.

== Background ==
He was the second son and one of sixteen children of Thomas Tremayne of Collacombe, Lamerton, Devon and his wife Phillipa Grenville, eldest daughter of Roger Grenville of Stow. The Tremaynes were a Devon branch of an old Cornish family. He inherited the family estates at Collacombe on the death of his elder brother Roger in 1572, and extensively rebuilt the manor house.

== Conspirator ==
Tremayne was in the service of Edward Courtenay, 1st Earl of Devon, who, as a great-grandson and last male heir of King Edward IV, had a strong claim to the English Crown. Devon was suspected of involvement in Wyatt's rebellion against Mary, and Tremayne was taken to the Tower of London in 1554. There he was tortured on the rack to make him give evidence but kept silent. After ten or eleven months in prison, he was released on a £40 fine, and he left England for Italy with Courtenay. Courtenay, while glad of his companionship, privately said that Tremayne had been foolish to flee England, thus leaving himself open to a charge of treason.

Courtenay died in Padua in early September 1556, probably of natural causes, despite rumours of poisoning. Tremayne then sought to join Sir Henry Sutton Dudley's conspiracy against Mary, and he joined the camp of English rebels at Rouen before the conspiracy exploded in April 1557. He then attached himself to Francis Russell, 2nd Earl of Bedford, who was another leading conspirator against Mary.

== Career under Elizabeth ==
When Elizabeth assumed the throne, she rewarded Tremayne. He was elected a Member of Parliament for Tavistock, although he took little part in Parliamentary business, and he was raised to the office of commissioner of Lancaster. From 1561–1574, he was the chief receiver of royal taxes in nine counties. He was also interested in the conversion of Ireland. William Cecil had asked him to study the question, and he wrote Causes why Ireland is not Reformed. He served. as Chief Secretary for Ireland 1569–71. In 1571, he was a clerk of the Privy Council. He continued to take an interest in Irish affairs, and visited Ireland again in 1573.

== Family ==
He did not marry until 1576, when he married Eulalia St. Leger, daughter of Sir John St.Leger of Annery, Monkleigh and Catherine Neville, daughter of George Nevill, 5th Baron Bergavenny, by whom he had two children: his son Francis outlived him by only a few weeks. Collacombe then passed to Edmund's next brother Degory. Eulalia remarried Tristam Arscott (1544-1621) of Tetcott, and had further issue.

Tremayne was very close to Sir Francis Drake, who was his cousin. When the Queen entrusted him with the task of registering the bullion which Drake had brought back on the Golden Hind, she told him to lay aside ten thousand pounds worth of bullion for Drake's personal profit, but to keep this a strict secret. He was appointed to investigate the charges made against Drake by the Spanish Ambassador of his excessive cruelty to Spanish prisoners. To no one's surprise, he cleared Drake of all charges.

Political offices
Preceded by Edward Waterhouse	Chief Secretary for Ireland; 1569–1571	Succeeded by Philip Williams
