= John St. Leger (died 1596) =

English politician

Arms of St Leger of Annery, Devon: Azure fretty argent, a chief or

Sir John St Leger (died 1596), of Annery in Monkleigh, Devon, was an English landowner who served in local and national government.

== Origins ==
He was the son of Sir George St Leger, of Annery, and his wife, Anne Knyvett, daughter of Sir Edmund Knyvett, of Buckenham, and his wife Eleanor Tyrrell. His paternal grandparents were Sir James St Leger and Lady Anne Butler, heiress of Annery, daughter of Thomas Butler, 7th Earl of Ormond and great-aunt of Queen Anne Boleyn. One of his great-uncles was Sir Thomas St Leger, the husband of Anne of York, Duchess of Exeter, sister of Kings Edward IV and Richard III.

== Public career ==
Knighted in 1544 and Sheriff of Devon in 1560, he was Member of Parliament for Dartmouth, Devon, in 1555–1558, Devon in 1559–1563, Arundel, Sussex, in 1563–1571, Devon again in 1571–1583 and Tregony, Cornwall in 1584–1585.

== Marriage and children ==
He married Catherine Nevill, daughter of George Nevill, 5th Baron Bergavenny and his third wife Lady Mary Stafford, youngest daughter of Edward Stafford, 3rd Duke of Buckingham and his wife Lady Eleanor Percy. Their children included:

- John St Leger, said to be a soldier in Ireland, who died unmarried and in poverty
- Mary St Leger, who married Sir Richard Grenville of Stowe in Kilkhampton, Cornwall, the famous captain of the Revenge, and was mother of Sir Bernard Grenville.
- Frances St Leger, who married John Stucley (1551–1611), of Affeton in East Worlington, Devon and was the mother of Sir Lewis Stucley
- Margaret St Leger, who married Richard Bellew of Ash in Braunton, Devon. A monument to the couple survives in Braunton parish church.
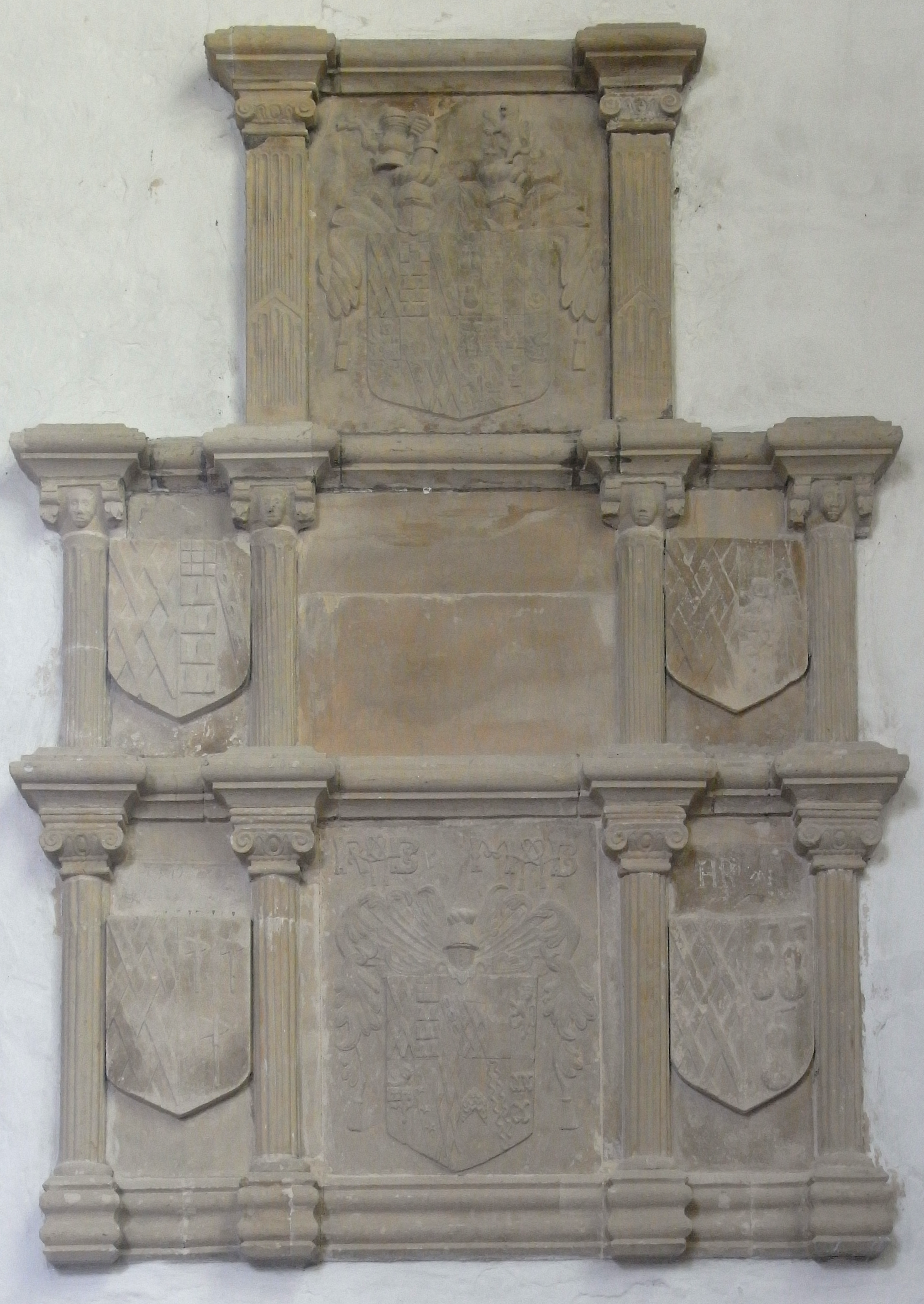
  16th century mural monument of Richard Bellew of Ash and his wife Margaret St Leger of Annery in Braunton Church, Devon
- Eulalia St Leger, who married first Edmund Tremayne of Collacombe in Lamerton, Devon, who was Chief Secretary of Ireland, and secondly Tristram Arscott (1544–1621) of Tetcott, Devon, who bought Annery from his father-in-law.

== Death ==
Despite accumulating much land, he became encumbered with debts and parted with many of his estates. He died "a poor man" and was buried on 8 October 1596 in the parish church of Monkleigh. On the death of his son John without children, the St Leger family of Annery was extinguished.

== Sources ==
- Virgoe, Roger, Biography of St Leger, Sir John (by 1516-93/96), of Annery, published in The History of Parliament: the House of Commons 1509-1558, ed. S.T. Bindoff, 1982
- Fuidge, N.M., Biography of St Leger (Sellenger), Sir John (by 1516-93/96), of Annery, published in The History of Parliament: the House of Commons 1558-1603, ed. P.W. Hasler, 1981
- W. D. Pink, 'The Parliamentary History of Tregony', The Western Antiquary, Volume VI, Part V (1886), 117–121
