= Annery, Monkleigh =

Historic estate in Devon, England

Coordinates: 50°58′49″N 4°11′54″W

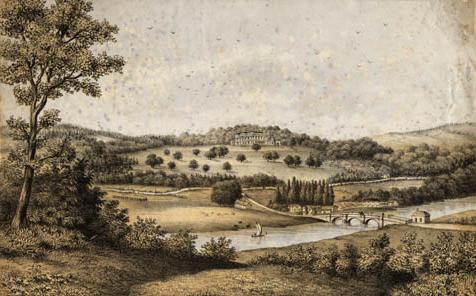
Annery House, post 1872, viewed from the east bank of the River Torridge in Weare Giffard parish, looking westward. "Halfpenny Bridge" was built as a toll bridge in 1835; the toll-house is visible to the right on the river bank. The battlemented Annery kiln with its ramp is visible on the far bank. Between Annery Kiln and the present A386 road can be seen the railway line, with train proceeding downstream northward to Bideford, opened in 1872 which in places followed the course of the former Rolle Canal. Westcountry Studies Library, Exeter, ref:P&D07995

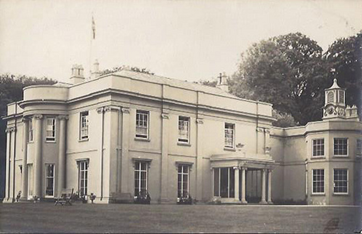
Annery House, early 20th-century photograph, before it was demolished in 1958.

Annery was an historic estate in the parish of Monkleigh, North Devon.

It was one of the original endowments of Tavistock Abbey, founded in 961. The first recorded tenant of the estate was Osbert de Annery, who took his name from the estate. By 1260 the estate was held by the Stapeldons; Bishop of Exeter Walter de Stapeldon (1261–1326) was born at Annery. From the Stapeldons, it was inherited by the Hankfords, amongst whom were the judge Sir William Hankford (ca. 1350 – 1423). In about 1800 the mansion house was rebuilt or significantly remodelled in the neo-classical style by the Tardrews. It was demolished in the late 1950s. The estate was split-up and is now in multiple ownership. A bungalow occupies the site of the former manor house. Three of the Victorian gatehouses survive as does the Georgian dower house and the stable-block.

== Mansion house ==
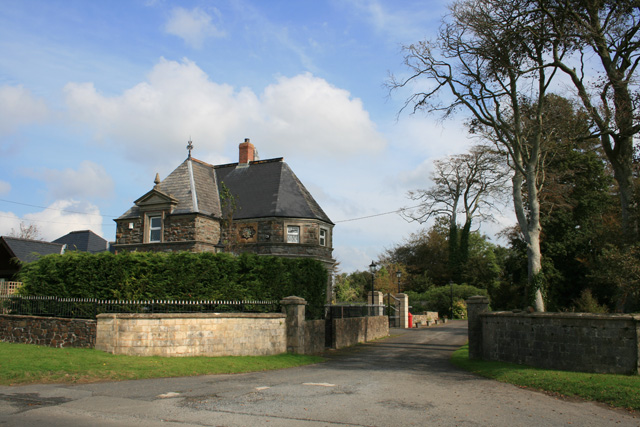
Main entrance lodge to the west of the former mansion house, off the A388 road

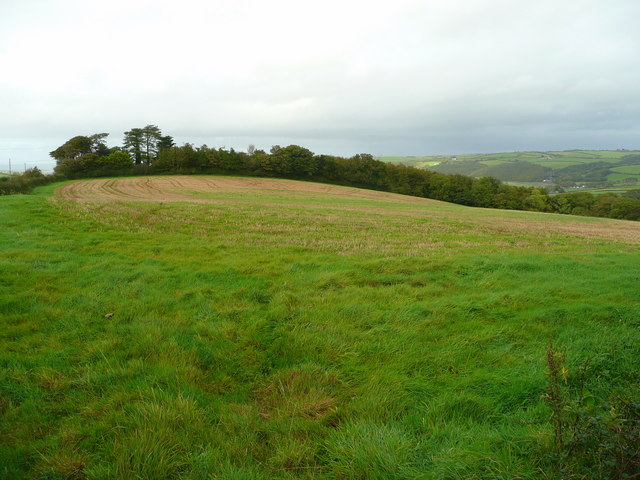
Hilltop between the Rivers Torridge and Yeo looking north towards Annery Wood

The medieval mansion stood in a "fine timbered park" dating back to the 13th century or before. A deerpark may have been established as early as 1422, but is known to have been in existence by about 1540. During the reign of Richard II (1377–1399), there was a fishery on River Torridge and a dovecote.

The ancient mansion fell into decay by about 1800 and a new neo-Classical building was built (Note: It has also been said that the building was modernised and refurbished.) or re-built around the original medieval mansion. It was described as having a "stucco front with Ionic order to full height and entablature plus parapet. On the east is a bow to full height. On the north is a projecting octagonal parapet." In 1912, it was described as having an outer and larger inner hall, four reception rooms, at least 12 bedrooms, oval room, library, well-appointed kitchen and butler's pantry, and a servants' hall. The dining room had "richly carved paneling" and the outer hall contained black marble and stone. Unusually modern for the time, there were 5 water closets and 4 bathrooms. A glass-sided portico was supported by Corinthian columns. Views from the property included Annery's woodland, much of which is gone now, and the River Torridge valley.

Located on the grounds is the Dower House, a large Georgian house with a "continuous Doric verandah." During Mrs Somes's ownership the head gardener lived in the 6 bedroom Dower House and other estate workers lived in cottages at Annery kiln or in the four lodges. Flowers, ferns, peaches and nectarines were grown in glasshouses. A coach-house, stables, wood house, two cider houses, wash-house, coal house were some of the outbuildings.

It was demolished after September, 1958, (Note: English Heritage stated that the manor was demolished in 1957, but Lauder reports that it was demolished when Berridge owned it, following its sale in September 1958.) but the kitchen garden walls, which include the date "1813" carved above a door, have survived and have been grade II listed since 1988.

== Toponymy ==
The name is recorded as Anri in the 10th. century grant to Tavistock Abbey and later as Auri in 1193. In 1381 there is a record of it as Aury, and as Uppeaury in 1386. These forms with letter u are, according to the English Place-Name Society (EPNS), clearly due to errors of transcription.

In 1238 it was recorded as Anerie and also as Ass, Anery. In 1278 Ass. Anry appears, Upanry in 1332, and Saxton, the cartographer, noted it as Annarye in 1577. The EPNS says that no explanation of the name can be offered. Hallsannery is a farm in existence today 1 mile north of the former Annery mansion house.

== Estate ==
=== Saxon ===
The first surviving record of the manor of Annery is in 981, when Anri was granted together with many other lands to Tavistock Abbey by Ælfwynn, the wife of the Saxon magnate Ordwulf, son of the Abbey's founder Ordgar, Ealdorman of Devon (d.971). She also donated the following manors, all near Annery in North Devon: Hame (Abbotsham), Werdgete (Worthygate, in Parkham parish) and Orlege (Orleigh).

=== 11th & 12th centuries ===
The manor of Annery is not listed in the Domesday Book of 1086, but was possibly at that time a member of the manor of Abbotsham, in Shebbear hundred. It is next recorded as Auri (sic) in a Bull of Exemption and Confirmation of Pope Celestine III dated 1193 confirming it to Tavistock Abbey.

=== de Annery ===
According to Tristram Risdon, the earliest recorded tenant of the estate was Osbert de Annery.

=== Stapledon ===
By 1260 the estate was held by the Stapeldons; In that year Walter de Stapeldon was born, probably at Annery, and later served as Bishop of Exeter from 1307 to 1326 and as King Edward II's Lord High Treasurer. The family originated at the estate of Stapledon in the parish of Cookbury, near Holsworthy, Devon. (Note: Worthy, who provided a biography of Stapledon's life, questions whether he was born at Annery or at the estate in Cooksbury.) His monument and effigy exist in Exeter Cathedral. Directly across the north ambulatory and opposite the latter is the monument and effigy to Sir Richard Stapledon (died 1320), a judge and elder brother of the bishop, whose male issue continued for two or three generations at Annery, then on the failure of male progeny, Annery passed via a daughter and sole heiress, Thomasin Stapledon, to her husband Sir Richard I Hankford.

=== Hankford ===
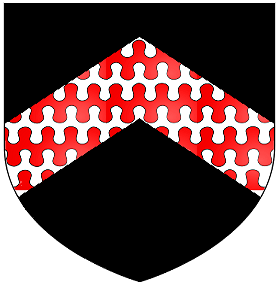
Arms of Hankford of Annery: Sable, a chevron barry nebuly argent and gules.

Sir William Hankford (died 1422), from a family long established at Bulkworthy in the parish of Buckland Brewer, North Devon, KB Lord Chief Justice of England was the most notable member of the Hankfords of Annery who inherited Annery by marriage to Thomasine de Stapledon. "Hankford's Oak" within the former estate of Annery was believed to mark the site where Hankford was shot dead by his gamekeeper, either accidentally or as a contrivance of suicide by the judge, who reportedly instructed the gamekeeper to shoot any apparent intruder who refused to answer when challenged. He is buried in Monkleigh Church's Annery Aisle, where his monument survives. Since his son Richard died before him in 1419, Sir William Hankford's heir was his grandson, Sir Richard Hankford (c. 1397 – 1431), who married firstly Elizabeth FitzWarin (d.1426/8) (or "FitzWarren") the sole heiress of her brother Fulk FitzWarin, 7th Baron FitzWarin (1406–1420), feudal baron of Bampton and holder of part of the feudal barony of Barnstaple, including that barony's seat of Tawstock. His eldest daughter from this first marriage was Thomasine Hankford (1422/3-1453), born at Tawstock, who inherited from her mother Bampton and Tawstock and many other manors and married William Bourchier, 9th Baron FitzWarin (1407–1470). Sir Richard Hankford's second wife was Anne Montagu (died 1457), a daughter of John Montacute, 3rd Earl of Salisbury (c. 1350 – 1400). Richard Hankford's daughter from his second marriage was Anne Hankford (c. 1431 – 1485), who inherited Annery. She married the extremely wealthy Thomas Butler, 7th Earl of Ormond (died 1515).

=== Butler ===
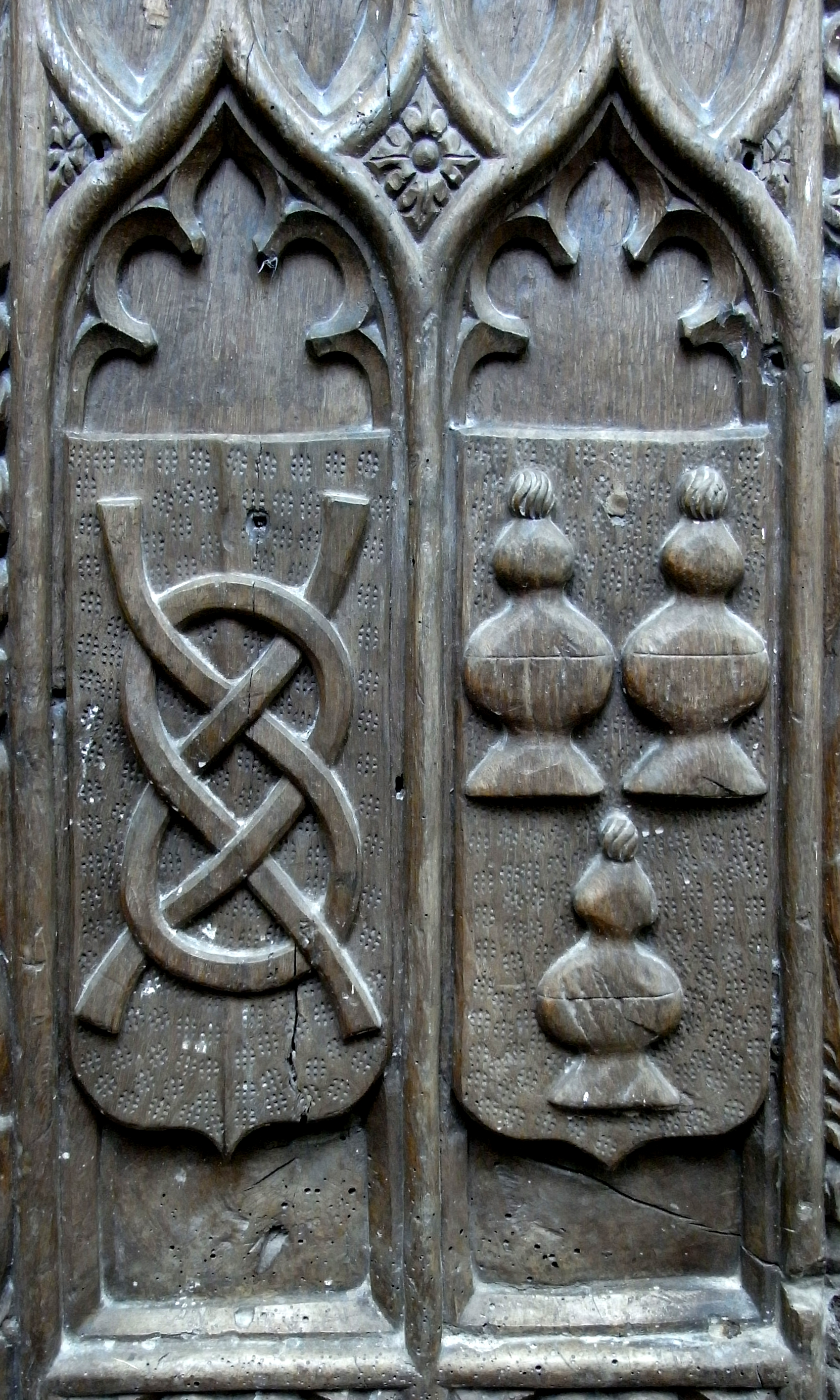
Bench end in Monkleigh Church, Devon (parish church of Annery) showing the Ormonde knot and arms of Butler: Gules, three covered cups or, both displayed on escutcheons within Gothic cusped lancet arches

Anne Hankford and Thomas Butler (or Boteler) had two daughters, Margaret Butler (c. 1454 – 1539), who married Sir William Boleyn, and Anne Butler (born c. 1455), who inherited Annery and brought it to the family of her husband Sir James St. Leger.

=== St Leger ===
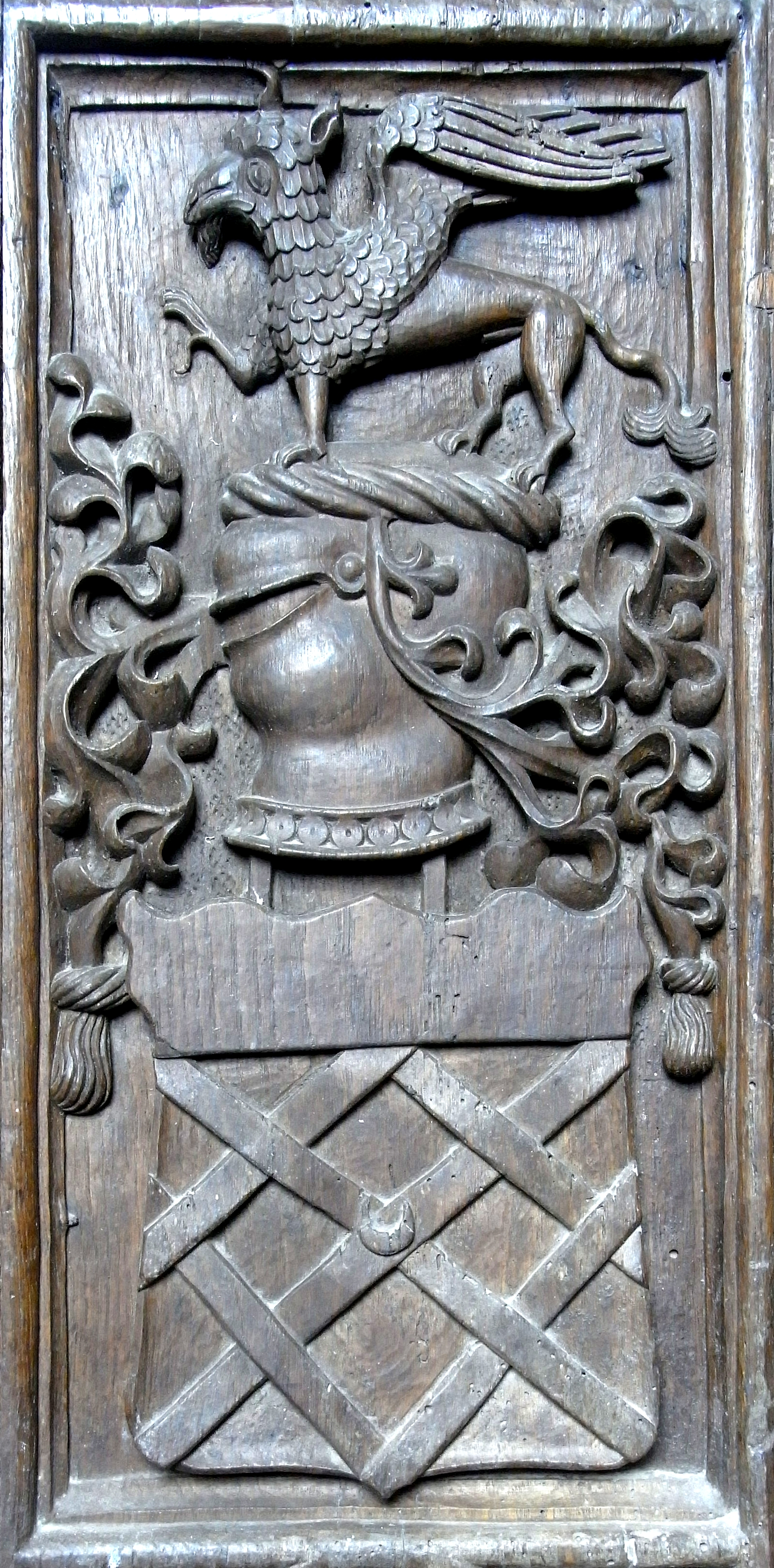
Left: bench end, Monkleigh Church, showing arms of St Leger of Annery: Azure fretty argent, a chief or a crescent for difference, with crest above of A griffin passant, shown right with tinctures

Sir James St Leger was the third son of Sir John St Leger (died 1441) of Ulcombe, Kent, by his wife Margery Donnet. James's elder brother was Sir Thomas St Leger, brother-in-law of Kings Edward IV and Richard III. Annery passed to Sir George St Leger, the son and heir of Sir James St Leger by Anne Butler, and then to his son Sir John St. Leger (died 1596). The St Leger's also held estates at Dartington and Canonsleigh Abbey. At some time before his death in 1596 Sir John St Leger sold Annery to his son-in-law Tristram Arscott (1544–1621) of Launcells, the son and heir of Richard Arscott (died 1578), the 4th son of John Arscott (died 1541) of Arscott in the parish of Holsworthy. On 7 October 1583 Tristram Arscott had married Eulalia, daughter of Sir John St. Leger and widow of Edmund Tremayne (died 1582) of Collacombe, Lamerton, Chief Secretary for Ireland and Clerk of the Privy Council. (Note: Arscott's wife was also recorded to have been Elizabeth.)

=== Arscott ===
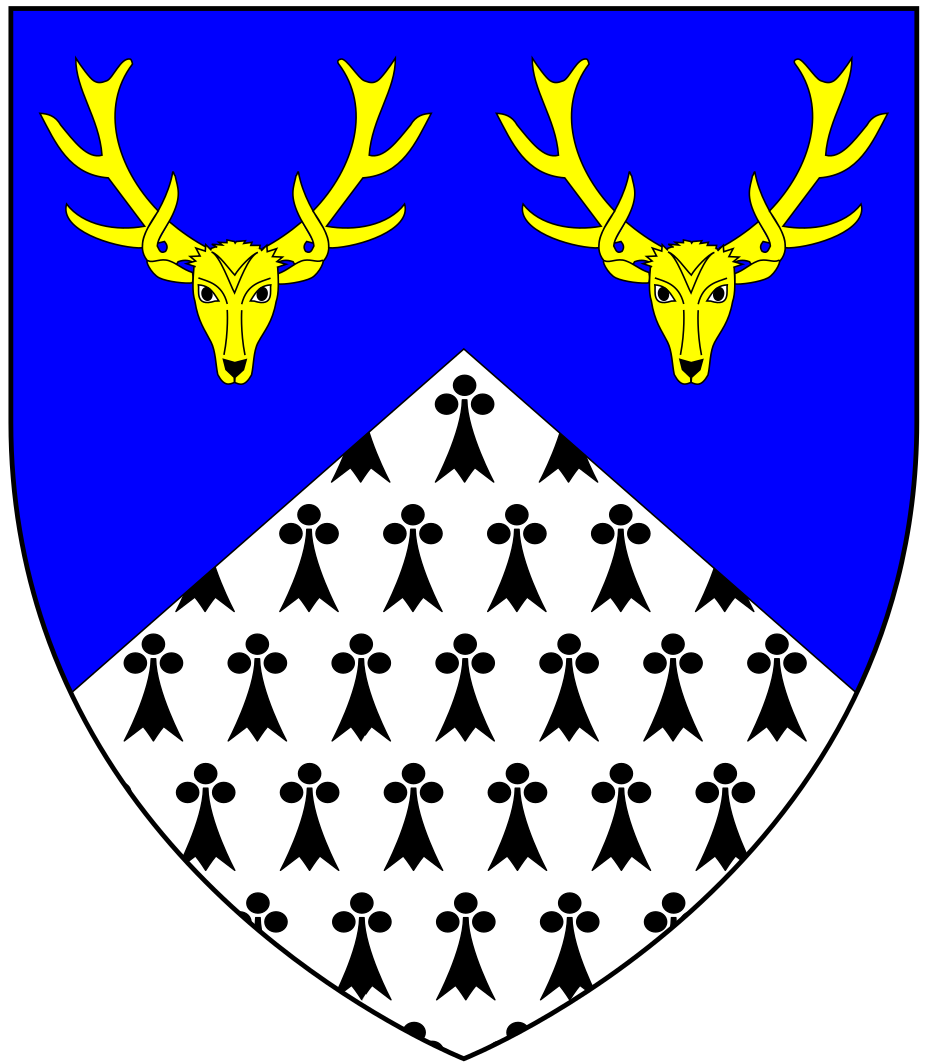
Arms of Arscott: Per chevron azure and ermine in chief two buck's heads cabossed or

Tristram Arscott (died 1621) of Launcells, Cornwall, purchased Annery from his father-in-law, Sir John St Leger. Annery was inherited by Tristram's son John Arscott (born 1591), whose own three sons, baptised at Monkleigh, all died young, leaving their sister Elizabeth Arscott (born 1611), his sole heiress. She married a man from London named Johnson.

=== Boyle ===
In 1641 the property was bought from John Arscott for £5000 by Richard Boyle, 1st Earl of Cork and left in 1643 to his 6th son Francis.

=== Prust ===
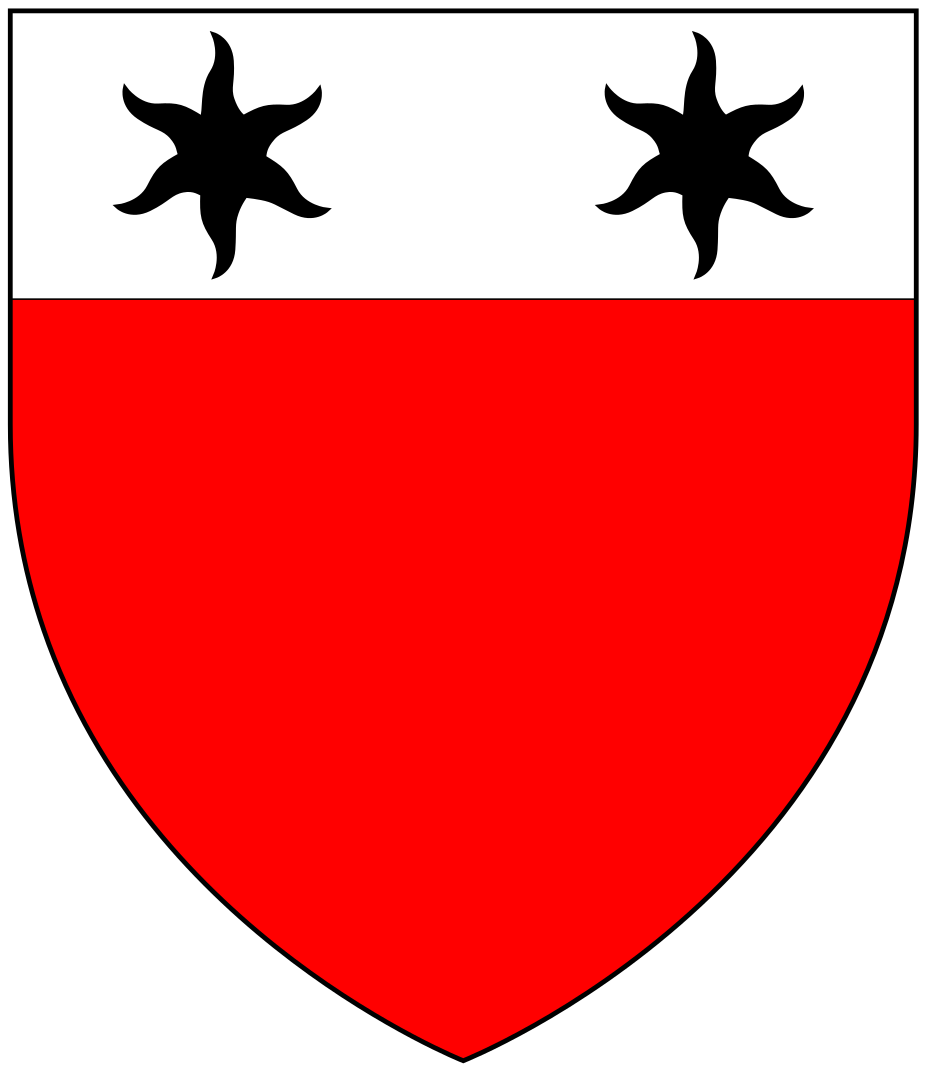
Arms of Prust of Thorry, Hartland: Gules, on a chief argent two estoiles sable

Annery was owned by the Prust family sometime after the Arscotts. The first family member who can with certainty be identified as seated at Annery is Lt. Col. Joseph Prust (1620–1677), who is known to have been baptised at Bideford. He was the second son of Hugh Prust (died 1666) of Gorven in the parish of Hartland, from an ancient Devon family. Joseph was a staunch Royalist during the Civil War and lost his hand at the siege of Plymouth. Joseph bequeathed Annery to his son John and daughter Anne in equal moieties. In 1679 Anne Prust married Richard Hawke, son of Josias Hawke of Bodgate in North Petherwin.

== 1800 house and estate ==
=== Vivian ===
The occupant of Annery in 1810 was Richard Vyvyan, Esq., one of the subscribers to the 1810 edition of John Prince's Worthies of Devon.

=== Tardrew ===
The 1811 edition of Tristram Risdon's Survey of Devon (1810 Notes) states that "The estate of Annery has, of late years, passed through several hands, and now belongs to Mr. Tardrew, of Bideford". This was William Tardrew, a ship-owner and builder who played an active part in public life – amongst other duties he was a magistrate and Deputy Lieutenant for Devon. He spent a great deal of money on improving the property, apparently before 1822 when Lysons wrote that "the house has been modernized by Mr. Tardrew", adding that until about 1800 the old house had had an impressive long gallery for which it was famous.

Tardrew operated a ship yard from an inlet of the River Torridge next to Annery kiln, but moved it to the canal sea-lock after the latter's construction. In 1836 Lord Rolle leased his Rolle Canal to a partnership of four men, one of whom was William Tardrew of Annery, who held six of the fourteen shares. In 1846 a new partnership was formed comprising William Tardrew and George Bragington, an original investor and Lord Rolle's former canal agent. Tardrew is said not to have contributed his agreed share of new capital to the business, and soon the business failed.

After William Tardrew died in 1853, his widow, Louisa, lived on in the house until her death, aged 92, in 1871. The whole estate, including the main house, around 560 acres of land, many cottages, Annery Kiln and other buildings was auctioned in 1872.

=== Somes ===
The estate was acquired by Maria Somes (1816–1911), the widow of Joseph Somes who had died in 1845. He had been a former Governor of the New Zealand Company, MP for Dartmouth and a major ship owner. She was a philanthropist, and employed at least 20 staff on the estate; the daughter of the estate carpenter later recalled that "it was a happy time and a happy house in Mrs. Somes' days". When the estate was advertised for sale in 1912 after her death, it was described as having woodlands, shady walks, glass-houses, and a walled kitchen garden.

=== Later owners ===
Mr Bayly, a famous polo player, owned the estate after Mrs. Somes. He and his wife modernised the house and installed an electricity generation plant. He died of meningitis soon after moving in. His widow lived at Annery until 1921 and then offered occupying tenants the opportunity to buy their farm or cottages, excluding the home farm and lodges. Lilias Fleming bought the property and, with Crystal Frazer, her adopted daughter, lived last at Annery. Miss Fleming died at the age of 86 in 1941. No one lived in the manor thereafter, and it deteriorated.

A Mr. Green, who was a timber merchant, bought the estate which then still had almost 100 acres of woodland. Whenever he visited the estate he stayed at the Dower House, the former head gardener's residence in the grounds, and the mansion remained empty. After his death the estate was put up for auction in several lots in September 1958, by which time the woodland had been reduced to about 20 acres and three small plantations. The mansion house was sold before auction to a Mr. Berridge who promptly had it demolished, and built a bungalow on its site.

== In popular culture ==
Annerey is said to be the location of a duel scene between Don Guzman and Will Carey in Charles Kingsley's novel, Westward Ho!. It also reportedly mentions the estate's deerpark and a banquet given by Sir James St. Leger in Annery's great hall.
