= Joseph Prust =

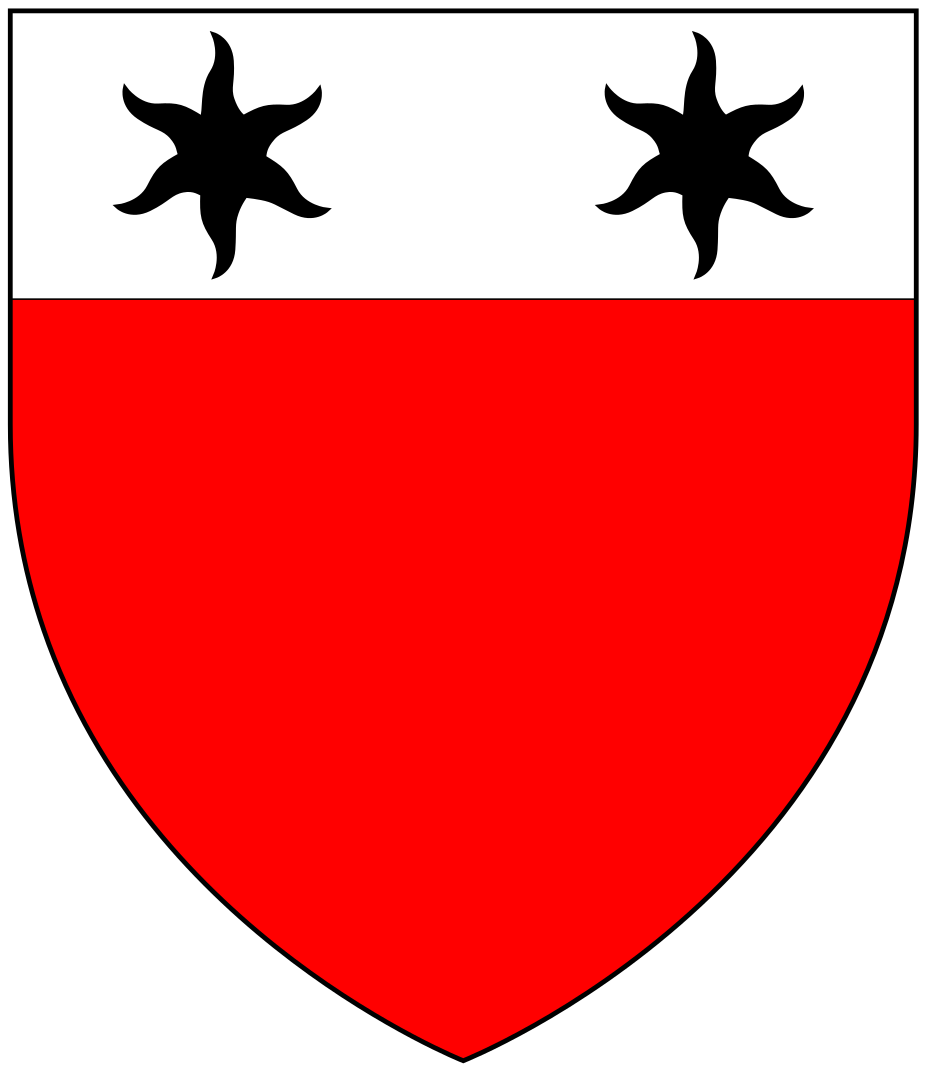
Arms of Prust of Thorry, Hartland: Gules, on a chief argent two estoiles sable

Joseph Prust (1620–1677) of Annery, in the parish of Monkleigh, Devon, was a royalist military commander during the Civil War. He was a lieutenant colonel.

== Origins ==
Joseph Prust was born in 1620 and baptised at Bideford. He was the 2nd son of Hugh Prust (died 1666) of Gorven in the parish of Hartland, by his first wife Anne Cary, daughter of Francis Cary of Alwington and Clovelly The Prusts were an ancient Devon family, first mentioned in a deed of 1199 referring to Osbert Prust, whose son was "John Prust of Gorven" The Prusts of Annery were related by marriage to the Coffin family, lords of the manor of Monkleigh in which Annery was situated. In 1628 his father Hugh Prust married as his second wife Elizabeth Hurding (d.1668), daughter of Henry Hurding of Dorset and widow of John Coffin (1593–1622) of Portledge in the parish of Alwington and lord of the manor of Monkleigh. In 1645 Joseph's elder brother Hugh Prust (1614–1650) married their step-sister Jane Coffin (1619–1646), eldest daughter of John Coffin (d.1622).

== Career ==
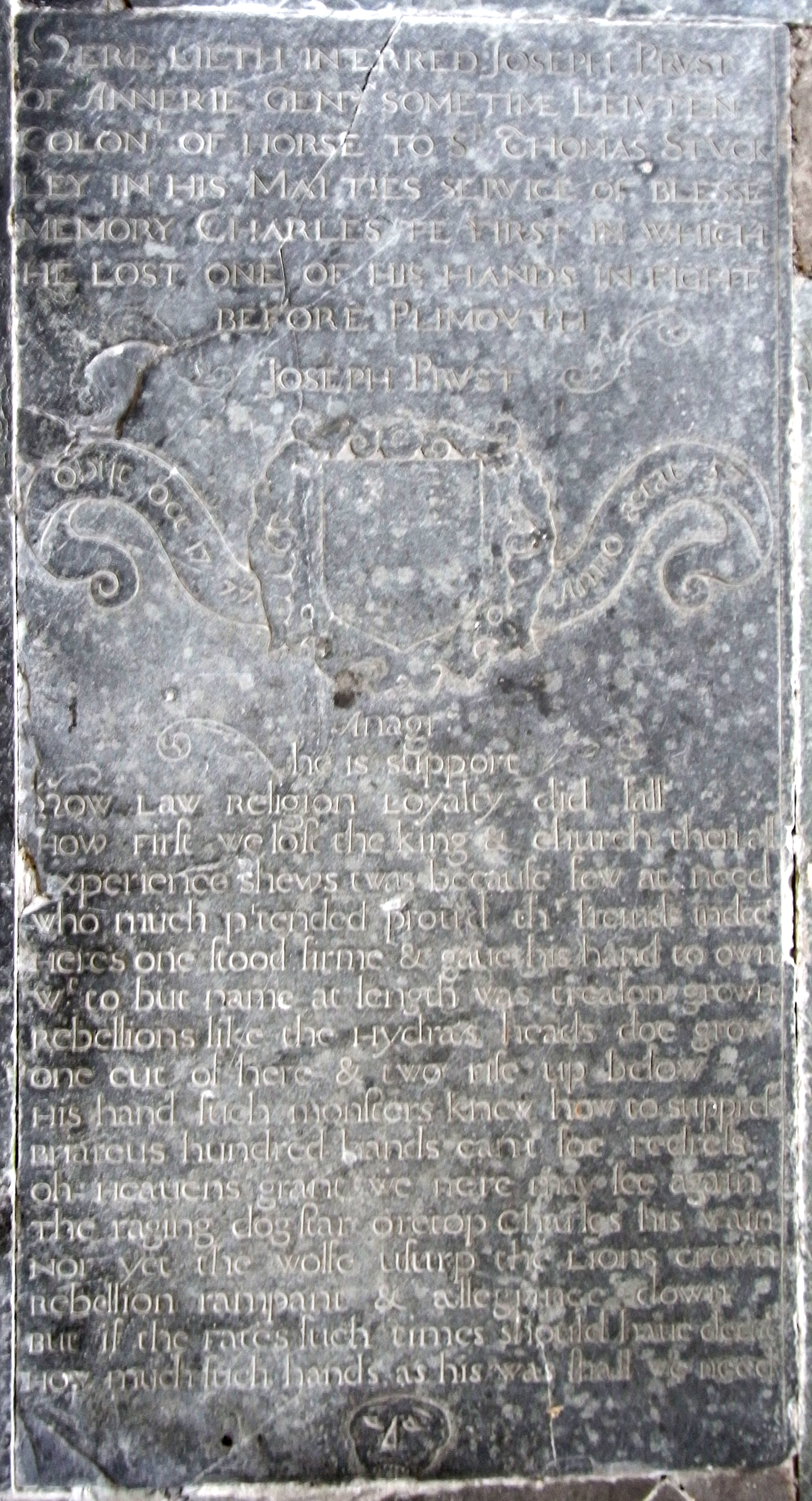
Ledger stone of Joseph I Prust (d.1677) of Annery, Annery Chapel, Monkleigh Church

Prust was a staunch Royalist during the Civil War. His inscribed ledger stone survives in the floor of the Annery Chapel in Monkleigh Church and reveals that he was a Lt.Col. in the Regiment of Horse of Sir Thomas Stucley (d.1663) of Affeton Castle and that he lost a hand during combat in the Civil War at Plymouth. His ledger stone shows the following biographical inscription:

"Here lieth interred Joseph Prust of Annerie gent. sometime leiutent colon'l of horse to sr. Thomas Stuckley in his Maj'ties service of blessed memory Charles the First in which he lost one of his hands in fight before Plimouth.

Joseph Prust, obiit Oct 17 77 (arms of Prust sculpted in relief) anno aetat. 57. Anagr. He is support.

How law, religion, loyalty did fall,
How first we lost the king & church then all,
Experience shews 'twas because few at need,
Who much pr'tended proud th'r freinds indeed,
Here's one stood firme & gave his hand to own,
Wr to but name at length was treason grown,
Rebellions like the Hydra's heads doe grow,
One cut of here & two rise up below,
His hand such monsters knew how to suppress,
Briareus' hundred hands can't soe redress,
Oh Heaven's grant we nere may see again,
The raging dogstar o'retop Charles his wain,
Nor yet the wolfe usurp the lion's crown,
Rebellion rampant & allegiance down,
But if the Fates such times should have decreed,
How much such hands as his was shall we need".

== Marriage and children ==
He married Anne Keynes (1630–1660), daughter and co-heiress of John Keynes, by whom he had three sons and one daughter:

- Hugh Prust (1656-1656), eldest son who died an infant
- Joseph Prust (1658–1692), 2nd son, died childless
- Capt. John Prust (1660–1695), of Annery, 3rd son. He married Mary Leigh (1672–1711), by whom he had three sons who died young and a daughter and heiress Anne Prust (1694–1741), who married in 1715 Richard Annesley, 6th Earl of Anglesey (c. 1693 – 1761), an Irish peer and governor of Wexford. Her husband deserted her almost immediately and entered into a further bigamous marriage. Anne Prust died childless and was buried in August 1741 as Countess of Anglesey.

== Death and burial ==
Joseph Prust died in 1677 aged 57 and was buried at Monkleigh. He left at his death two surviving sons, Joseph II Prust (1658–1692), second but eldest surviving son, who died childless leaving as heir to his father's estate his younger brother John Prust (1660–1695), a captain in the army. Joseph II was buried in his mother's grave and John in that of his father.
