= Collacombe =

Historic manor in Devon, England

Collacombe is an historic manor in the parish of Lamerton, Devon, England. The manor house survives as a grade I listed building, known as Collacombe Barton or Collacombe Manor (House).

== Descent ==
=== d'Aumale ===
The Domesday Book of 1086 lists COLECOME as part of the triple-manor of Ottery-Collacombe-Willestrew, the second listed of the 17 Devonshire holdings of Robert d'Aumale one of the Devon Domesday Book tenants-in-chief of King William the Conqueror. He held it in demesne. The triple group had been held before the Norman Conquest of 1066 by three Saxon thanes, including Oslac and Burgred, as four manors. It was administered within Lifton hundred after 1066.

=== Courtenay ===
The Devonshire lands of Robert d'Aumale later formed part of the very large feudal barony of Plympton, whose later barons were the Courtenay family, Earls of Devon. The Book of Fees (1302) lists Collecumb and Willestre as held from the honour of Plympton, the third part of the triple-manor, Ottery, having dropped out of the grouping since being given to Tavistock Abbey by one of the predecessors of Ralph d'Aumale.

=== de Esse ===
In 1242 it was held by Raph de Esse.

=== Trenchard ===
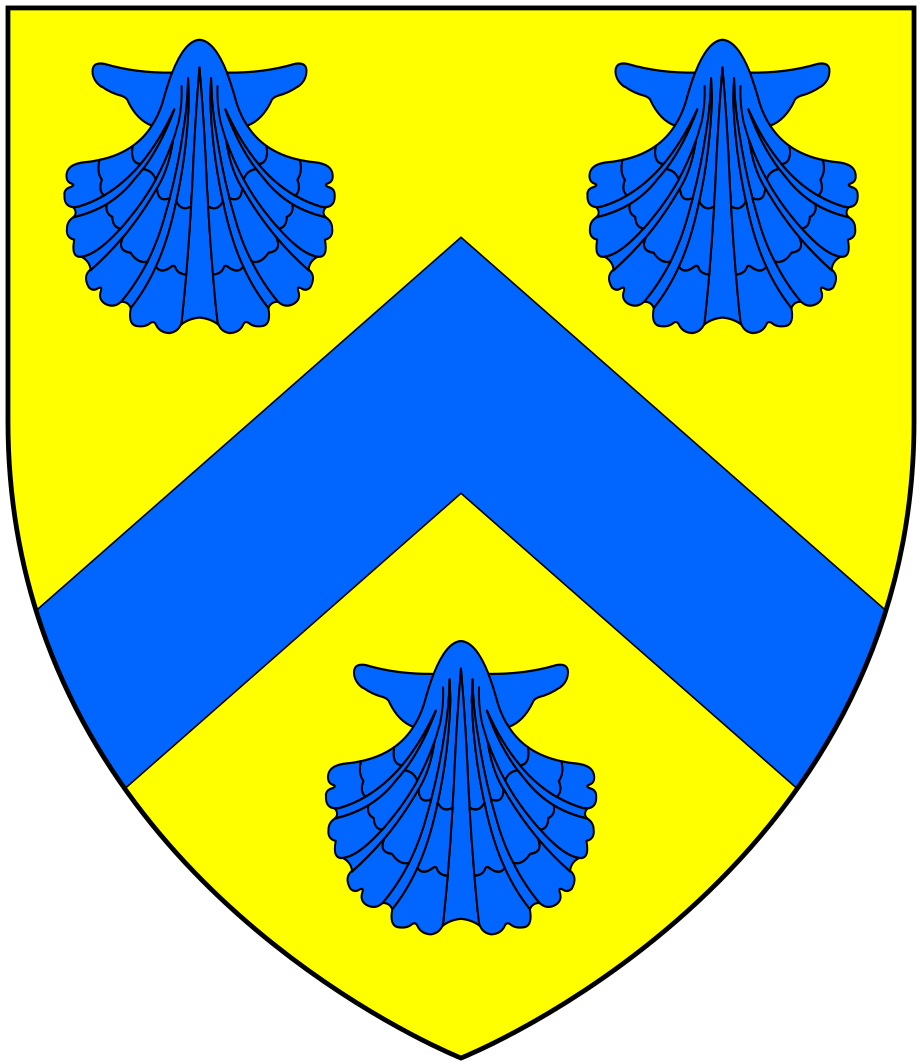
Arms of Trenchard: Or, a chevron between three escallops azure

In 1295 it was held by Sir Michael Trenchard, and in 1301 by Walter Trenchard. William I Trenchard held it in 1314 and William II Trenchard held it in 1345. The last in the male line of Trenchard left a daughter and heiress, Isabella Trenchard (died 1408), who married Thomas Tremayne of Carwythenack, in the parish of Constantine, Cornwall, and the manor of Collacombe passed to her descendants from this marriage. She survived her husband and remarried to Sir John Damerell, who by apparent coincidence was of the same family as the Domesday Book holder Robert d'Aumale (alias d'Amarell, Damarell, etc., Latinised to de Albemarle, de Albamara, etc.). As Sir John Damerell died without progeny he bequeathed to his wife and her progeny by her first husband Thomas Tremayne, the manors of North Huish, Sydenham Dammarel and Whitchurch.

=== Tremayne ===
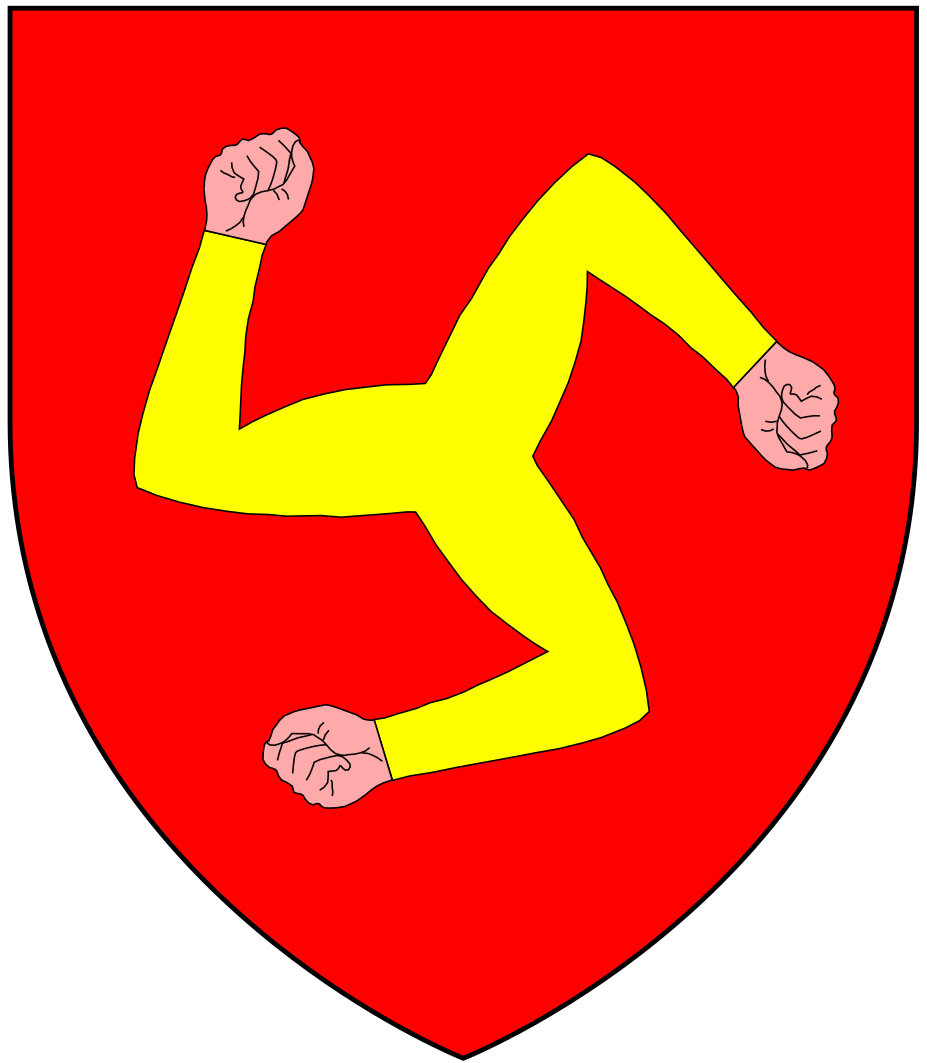
Canting arms of Tremayne of Sydenham: Gules, three dexter arms conjoined at the shoulders and flexed in triangle or the fists clenched proper

The Tremayne (originally de Tremayne) family originated at the manor of Tremayne in the parish of St Martin in Meneage, Cornwall, about 8 miles south-west of Penryn, from which they took their surname.

==== Thomas Tremayne ====
Thomas Tremayne of Carwythenack, in the parish of Constantine, Cornwall, who married the heiress Isabella of Collacombe, was the second son of Richard de Tremayne (died 1354) by his wife Mary Erney, a daughter of Sir Thomas Erney of Cornwall. Thomas's elder brother, who inherited the paternal estate of Tremayne, was John de Tremayne, a Member of Parliament for Cornwall in 1366 and 1369, who died without male progeny leaving two daughters and co-heiresses. Thomas's younger son was Rev. Thomas Tremayne, Rector of Aveton Giffard and a Canon of Exeter Cathedral in Devon.

==== Nicholas Tremayne (born 1368) ====
Nicholas Tremayne (born 1368), eldest son of Thomas Tremayne and Isabella Trenchard, married as his first wife Joan Dodscombe, daughter and heiress of Sir John Dodscombe.

==== Thomas Tremayne (died 1482) ====
Thomas Tremayne (died 1482), eldest son of Nicholas Tremayne (born 1368), married Elizabeth Carew, a daughter of "Thomas Carew", apparently Thomas Carew (died 1446) of Mohuns Ottery in Devon. In 1448 Edmund Lacey, Bishop of Exeter, granted the couple a licence to celebrate divine service "within their mansion of Collacombe", effectively to maintain a private chapel. The arms of Carew (Or, three lions passant in pale sable) are visible on the 1588 Tremayne monument in Lamerton Church.

==== John Tremayne (1452–1504) ====
John Tremayne (1452–1504), eldest son of Thomas Tremayne (died 1482), was Sheriff of Cornwall in 1486 and 1487. He married Jane Warre, a daughter of Sir Francis Warre. By his deed of 1493 he settled his lands in Devon in tail male on his heirs male forever.

==== Thomas Tremayne (1496–1562/3) ====
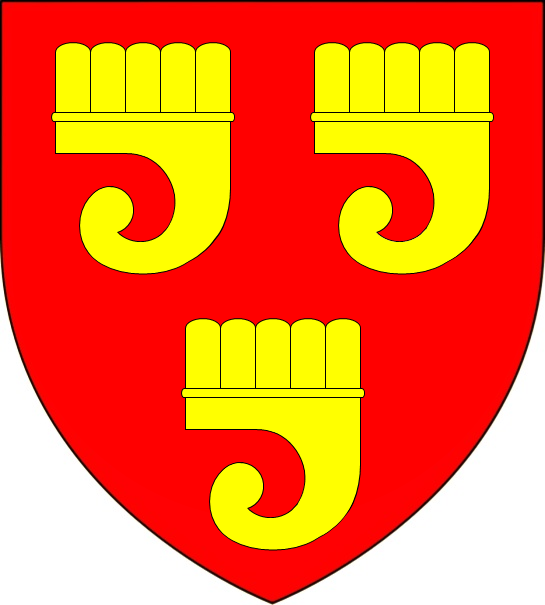
Arms of Grenville: Gules, three clarions or, as visible on the 1588 tremayne monument in Lamerton Church

Thomas Tremayne (1496–1562/3) of Collacombe, one of Prince's Worthies of Devon. He was the eldest son of John Tremayne (1452–1504), married Phillipa Grenville (died 1571), eldest daughter of Sir Roger Grenville (1477–1523) of Stowe, Kilkhampton in Cornwall and lord of the manor of Bideford in Devon, Sheriff of Cornwall in 1510–11, 1517–18, 1522, ancestor of John Granville, 1st Earl of Bath (1628–1701). Her brothers included Digory Grenville of Penheale, Cornwall and John Grenville (c.1506-c.1562), three times MP for Exeter, in 1545, 1554 and 1558. By Phillipa Grenville he had 16 children, including 8 sons, the eldest surviving three of which succeeded successively to Collacombe. Edmund Tremayne, the second son, was Chief Secretary for Ireland. A large standing monument erected in 1588 by his 3rd surviving son Degory Tremayne (died 1601) of Collacombe, survives in Lamerton Church which includes "lively" statues of five of his brothers, with lengthy biographical inscriptions in verse and a profuse display of the family's heraldry including the arms of Grenville and Trenchard.

==== Roger Tremayne (died 1571/2) ====
Roger Tremayne (died 1571/2), eldest son and heir, who married Anne Coffin, a daughter of Richard Coffin (died 1555) of Portledge in the parish of Alwington in Devon. He was predeceased by his only son John Tremayne (died 1553), and his 4 daughters were unable to inherit due to the tail male settlement.

==== Edmund Tremayne (died 1582) ====
Edmund Tremayne (died 1582), next younger brother, of Collaton, a clerk to the Privy Council of Queen Elizabeth I, who rebuilt the manor house at Collacombe, which survives today. Evidence of his work includes the surviving large heraldic plaster overmantel to the fireplace in the great hall, with date "1574". He married Ulalia St Leger, a daughter of Sir John St Leger (died 1596) of Annery, Monkleigh in Devon. She survived him and in 1583 remarried to Tristram Arscott (1544–1621) of Launcells, the son and heir of Richard Arscott (died 1578), the 4th son of John Arscott (died 1541) of Arscott in the parish of Holsworthy, Devon. Her father sold the manor of Annery to Tristram Arscott.

By Ulalia he had one surviving son, Francis Tremayne (April 1582 – November 1582), who died an infant, having survived his father only a few weeks.

==== Francis Tremayne (1582–1582) ====
Francis Tremayne (April 1582 – November 1582), only surviving son, who died an infant, having survived his father only a few weeks. His heir under the entail was his uncle Degory Tremayne (died 1601).

==== Degory Tremayne (died 1601) ====
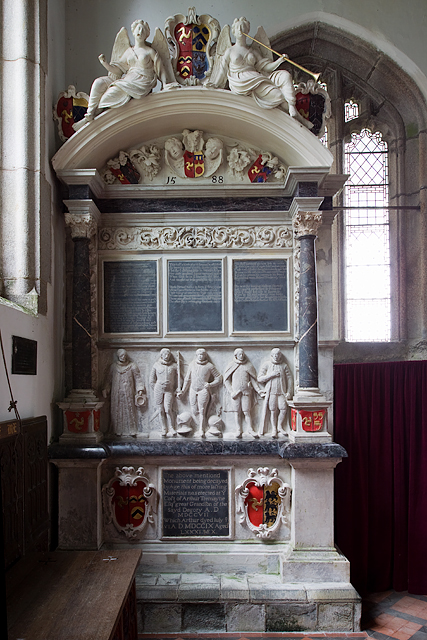
Monument in Lamerton Church, Devon, erected in 1588 by Degorie Tremayne in memory of six of his deceased brothers, with statues of five, one having died an infant. Only his brother John Tremayne was then still living, who is therefore not featured on the monument

Degory Tremayne (died 1601) of Collacombe, uncle, 3rd surviving son of Thomas Tremayne (1496–1562/3). He succeeded to Collacombe in November 1582. In 1588, when only one of his other brothers was still living, he erected the large monument in Lamerton Church to his 5 brothers, as the inscription relates "Through duty mov’d he of his care and cost, Caus’d to be fram'd this monument emboss'd". He married Elizabeth Vasey, a daughter of Thomas Vasey of Tamerton and widow of Richard Browning. Secondly he married Katherine Courtenay, a daughter of Sir Peter Courtenay (died 1552) of Ugbrooke, in the parish of Chudleigh, Devon, Sheriff of Devon in 1549, whose monument survives in Chudleigh Church. He was the 2nd son of Sir William Courtenay (1477–1535) "The Great", of Powderham, MP for Devon 1529, Sheriff of Devon 1522, 1525-6, 1533-4 and Esquire of the Body to King Henry VIII. The arms of Tremayne impaling Courtenay appear at the top of the monument in Lamerton Church. The first part of the inscription on the monument erected by Degory is as follows:

This here erected massy type contains,
The history of latter-age Tremains;
Who numb'ring fair descents of ancestry,
Are drawn from lines of long antiquity.
Thomas their sire match'd one of Grenvil's blood,
Philip her name by birth a gentile good;
From out her womb unto the world's full view,
Eight sons and just so many daughters grew.
Roger first born stepp'd into father's stead;
Edmund by course succeeded father dead.
Next Edmund fell the land to Degory,
Who only wrought his wasted name supply.

Through duty mov’d he of his care and cost,
Caus’d to be fram'd this monument emboss'd,
As witness of his love to parents gone,
Not that his praise should be engraved thereon.
Richard and John, the fourth and fifth so hight,
Both safe one timely birth brought forth to light;
The sixth and seventh like after twins in all,
Were Nicholas and Andrew, stout and tall.
Robert the least, and eke by kind the last,
Dy'd e're the term of infancy was past.
Of eight male two near of one age and stature
- Yet live; the rest pay’d tribute unto nature.”

The parents of th’ above recited race, -
Devoy'd of sense lie here inclos'd together,
Who Colacombe held their abiding place,
Till death's sad harbinger convey'd them hither.
Long faithful pairs they liv'd in wedlock-state,
And both enjoy'd many a blissful year,
E’re marriage knot dissolved was by fate,
Which wife bereaved of her husband dear.
The widow left, made choice to wed no more,
But spent in prayer the remnant of her days;
And shortly went the path he went before,
The path to heav'n whereof Christ keeps the keys.
Their life and death did truly testify,
Both in God's fear did live, and favour die.”

==== Later Tremaynes ====
In 1653 Edmund Tremayne (1587–1667) of Collacombe, Digory's grandson, sold the family's ancient seat of Carwythenack to Anthony Chepman of Constantine, for £850. The Tremayne family abandoned Collacombe in about 1700 and moved their seat to Sydenham in the parish of Marystow in Devon, which Edmund Tremayne (1649–1698) (4th in descent from Degory Tremayne) had inherited on his marriage to Arabella Wise, only daughter and heiress of Sir Edward Wise (1632–1675) of Sydenham, thrice MP for Okehampton. Arthur III Tremayne (1735–1800) (son of Arthur II Tremayne (1700/1–1796), Sheriff of Devon in 1739, grandson of Edmund Tremayne (1649–1698)), the last in the senior male line and great-grandson of Arabella Wise, who died unmarried at Sydenham, finally sold Collacombe to Sir William Pratt Call, 2nd Baronet (1781–1851), and bequeathed Sydenham to his very distant cousin Rev. Henry Hawkins Tremayne (1741–1829) of Heligan, Cornwall.

=== Eales ===
Richard Eales, of Easton House, Dawlish, lord of the manor of Dawlish (which he purchased), purchased the estate of Collacombe from Arthur Tremayne (1735–1800), the last in the senior male line, and also purchased from him in 1792, in partnership with Charles Luxmoore, the manor of North Huish. He acquired Luxmoore's share and sold the whole to Richard King of Fowelscombe, who built a house on the estate. Eales purchased various other property in Devon, including Huish from the Duke of Roxburgh, which in about 1812 he sold on to Lord Clinton, who renamed it Heanton Satchville and made it his seat. Eales sold Collacombe to Sir William Pratt Call, 2nd Baronet (1781–1851).

=== Call ===
Collacombe was purchased from Richard Eales by the banker Sir William Pratt Call, 2nd Baronet (1781–1851), of Whiteford House, Stoke Climsland, Cornwall, Sheriff of Cornwall in 1807-8. It was let as a farmhouse from 1810, during which time parts were demolished. In 1887 it was the property of his grandson, Sir William George Montagu Call, 4th Baronet (1849–1903) of Whitford House, Launceston. In 1887 the Tremayne family still owned the advowson of Lamerton Church.

=== Jack ===
In the 1950s to after 1962 Collacombe was the home of Major Archibald Jack, who in the 1950s restored the building.

=== Goide ===
In 1993 it was the residence of Peter Goide (born 1937), a director of Provend Operating Ltd and of Collacombe Farm Ltd.
