= Tremayne, Cornwall =

Hamlet in Cornwall, England

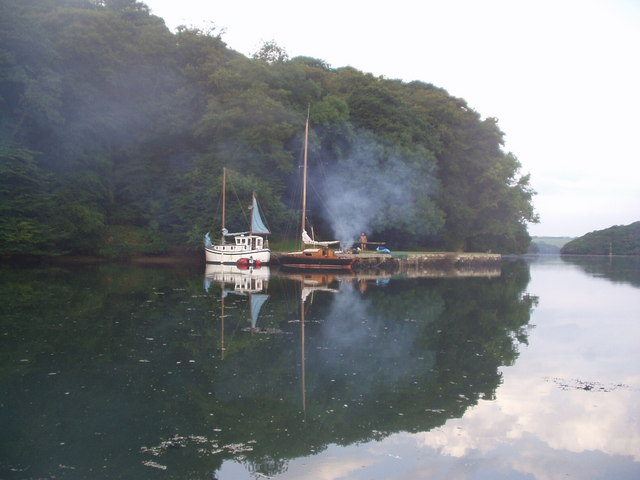
Riverside woodland and Tremayne Quay

Tremayne (Cornish: Tremen) is a hamlet in the parish of St Martin in Meneage, Cornwall, England, United Kingdom.

Tremayne House, a grade II listed building was the original seat of the prominent Tremayne family, later of Collacombe and of Sydenham in Devon.

Tremayne Woods is part semi-natural woodland and part plantation managed by the National Trust. A track leads down to Tremayne Quay (Tremain, in 1879), which was built by Sir Richard Vyvyan in 1847 for the visit of Queen Victoria to Trelowarren. Owing to unforeseen circumstances she did not visit. Her great-grandson, Edward, Duke of Windsor, landed at the quay during a visit in 1921. The present quay was built over an earlier quay which was the landing stage for Tremayne House. The woods and quay were bequeathed from the Vyvyan family of Trelowarren to the National Trust in 1978.
