= Monkleigh =

Village in Devon, England

Coordinates: 50.9626°N 4.20036°W

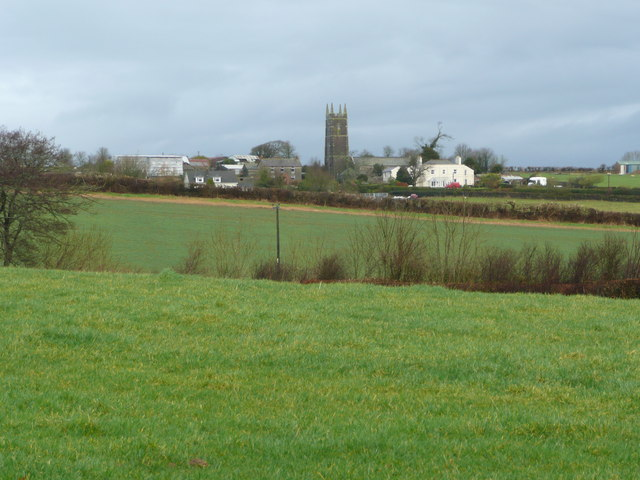
- Monkleigh

- Location within Devon
- OS grid reference: SS4520
- District: Torridge
- Shire county: Devon
- Region: South West
- Country: England
- Sovereign state: United Kingdom
- Post town: MONKLEIGH
- Postcode district: EX39
- Dialling code: 01805
- Police: Devon and Cornwall
- Fire: Devon and Somerset
- Ambulance: South Western
- UK Parliament: Torridge and Tavistock

Monkleigh is a village, parish and former manor in north Devon, England. It is situated 2.5 miles (4.0 km) miles north-west of Great Torrington and 3.5 miles (5.6 km) south-east of Bideford. It forms part of the Monkleigh and Littleham electoral ward. The population at the 2011 census was 1,488.

== Etymology ==
The name of the village, Monkleigh, originates from the Old English "Munckenelegh", used in 1244 to describe a "wood or clearing of the monks", referring to a 12th-century property owned by the Montacute Priory. The area was previously named "Lega" in the Domesday Book of 1086.

== Description ==
In 1887, John Bartholomew, Gazetteer of the British Isles, described Monkleigh as a village and a parish. It had a population of 540 people, covered 2177 acres, and had property that belonged to the Montacute monastery. It includes the hamlets of Saltern Cottages (also known as Annery Cottages) and Annery kilns, both of which are historic listed sites. Located west of the River Torridge valley, the village sits on high ground with scenic views of the parish. It was originally part of the Shebbear Hundred and is within the Church of England's Deanery of Hartland.

== History ==
=== Monastery ===
William, Count of Mortain, the founder of the Montacute Priory, gave the Monkleigh manor to the priory during the reign of Henry I (1100–1135). It was owned by the Montacute Priory in Somerset until the Dissolution of the Monasteries between 1536 and 1541.

=== Monkleigh manor ===
When the monasteries were dissolved, the manor was granted by the crown gratis on 26 August 1540 to James and Anne Coffyn (also Coffin) of Alwington for the term of her life. (Note: It was valued at £21 11s 6d per annum, but unusually no charge was made for the grant.) Anne was the widow of Sir George St Ledger of Annery. In June 1544, the crown granted the manor of Monkleigh to Sir John Fulford of Dunsford and Humphrey Colles of Barton, Somerset, who paid the purchase price for the manor and obtained royal licence to alienate (Note: The British Records Association's definition of "licence to alienate" is "royal permission, by Letters patent, to sell or dispose of a property obtained from the Crown and held by knight service.") to James Coffyn. (Note: On 11 June 1544 the crown granted the manor of Monkleigh, subject to the life interest of Coffyn's wife, to Sir John Fulford of Dunsford and Humphrey Colles of Barton, Somerset, along with other grants of property. For Monkleigh manor they were charged £194 3s 4d, representing 10 years' purchase of its annual value. They were also granted Monkleigh Woods for £29 13s 6d, representing 20 years' purchase Fulford and Coles paid the purchase price in full on 2 June 1544 and just one week later obtained royal licence to alienate, to James Coffyn of Alwington;) in other words, the manor was purchased for the Coffyns.

In 1810, the manor of Monkleigh was owned by Rev. John Pine-Coffin of Portledge, Alwington, from the same family as James Coffyn. About 1823 Richard Pine-Coffin sold Monkleigh manor land to John Rolle, 1st Baron Rolle for the development of the Rolle Canal.

=== Annery, historic estate ===
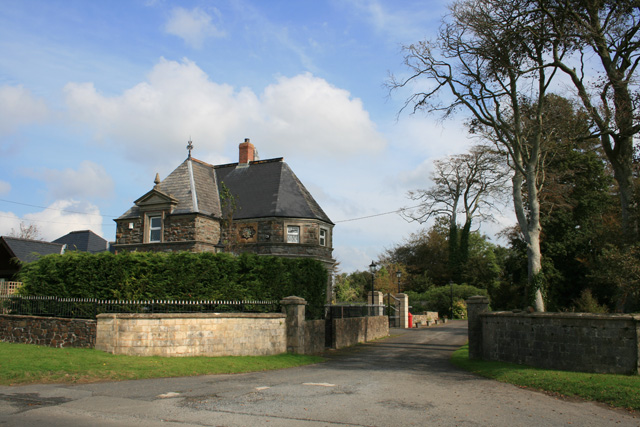
Gatehouse to the now demolished Annery estate

The former historic estate of Annery was a neo-Classical mansion house that stood in a "fine timbered park" dating back to the 13th century or before. An early owner was Osbert of Annery. By 1260, the house was owned by the Stapeldons; Walter de Stapeldon was born in the Annery that year and later became the Bishop of Exeter from 1307 to 1326 and Edward II's Lord High Treasurer. After the Stapeldons, it was owned by Sir William Hankford. The Annery fell into decay and in 1800 a new building was built on the grounds of the medieval building. (Note: It has also been said that the building was modernised and refurbished.) It was demolished in 1957.

The ruins of the lime Annery kiln, built about 1823–1824 for Lord Rolle, are located along the River Torridge. Limestone was brought from Caldy Island and Gower Peninsula.

=== Church of St George ===
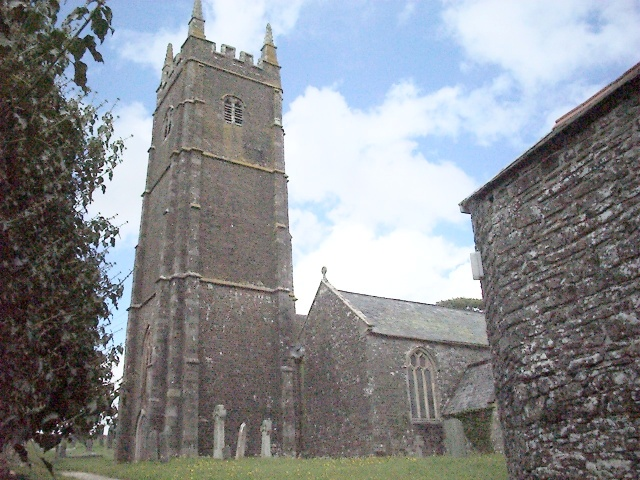
St George's Church, Monkleigh

In the early 15th century, parish church is dedicated to St George. Sir William Hankford, Chief Justice of the King's Bench, left monies for the church to complete construction of the south aisle in his will. He stipulated that the south aisle should be reserved for his and his heirs burial. Hankford died in 1423; at that time, the fabric was being rebuilt. Hankford was buried in a canopied alter-tomb.

The Annery aisle has bench-ends decorated with the arms of the Annery manor families and emblems of the Passion. Tiles from the late medieval period are found in the aisle and the nave. A kneeling effigy of James Coffin, Esquire (1566) in armour sat on a high tomb and was since destroyed. Pevsner stated that a small monumental brass of a kneeling knight, affixed to a stone tablet, and with heraldic escutcheons of the arms of Coffin, is dated from the 16th century. Sir James St. Leger (1509) is represented in brass.

From 1862 to 1863, the church was restored. According to Pevsner, it contains one of the most remarkable medieval wooden screens in Devon; It is a detailed parclose screen that may date to 1537 when Dame Anne St. Leger founded a chantry in the chapel.

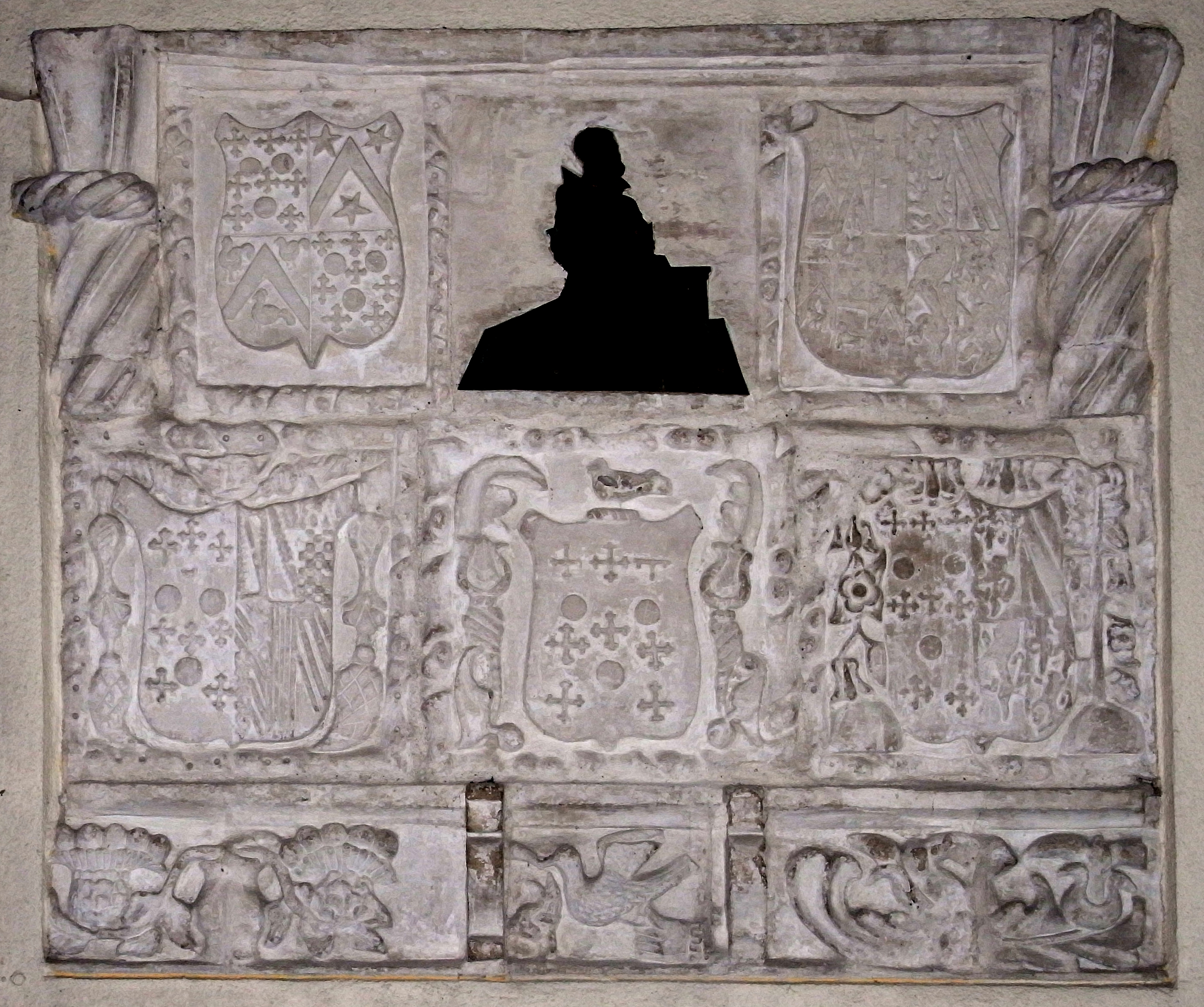
16th century mural monument believed to be James Coffin, surrounded by escutcheons of the Coffin arms

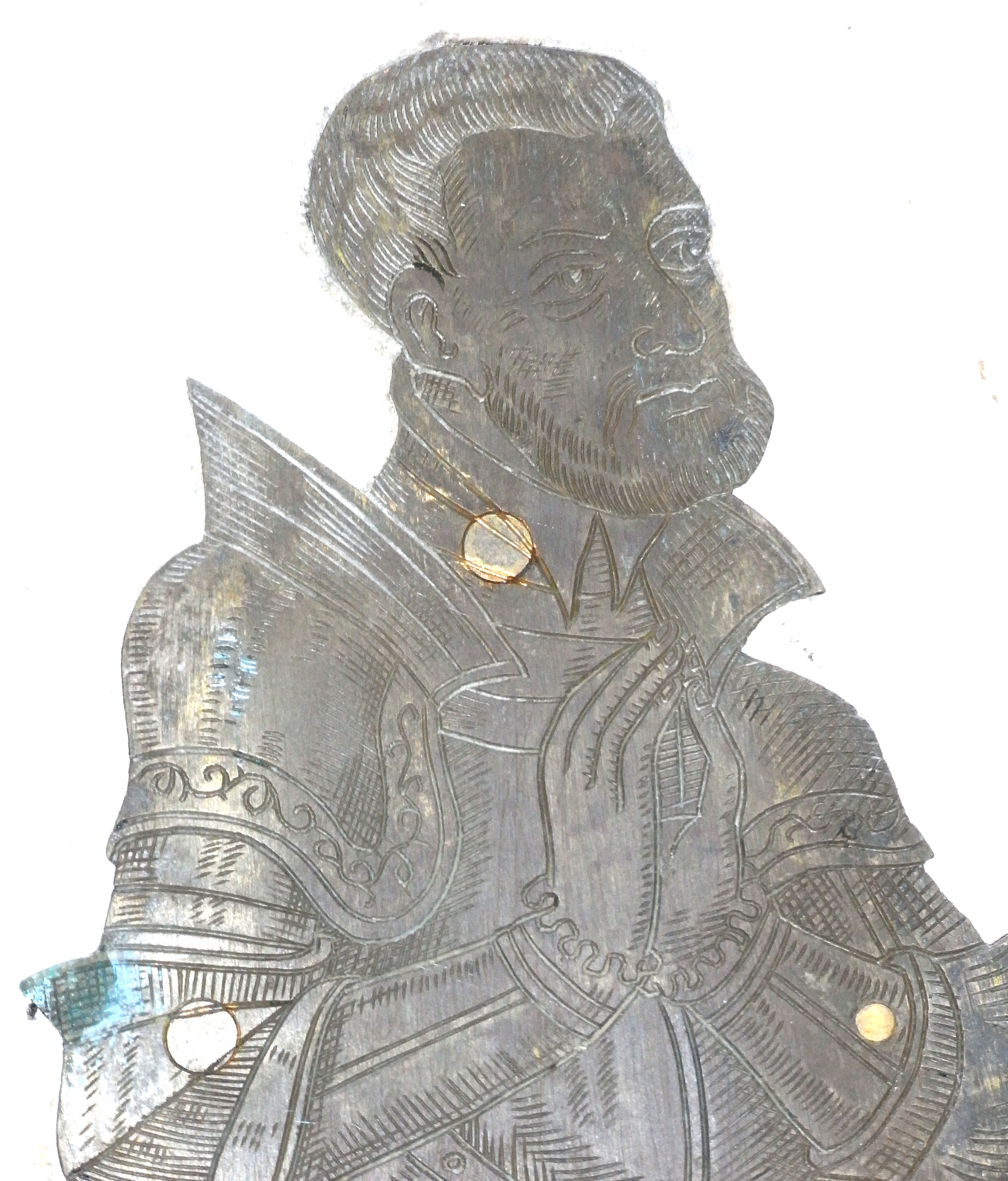
Detail of 16th. century monumental brass believed to be James Coffin

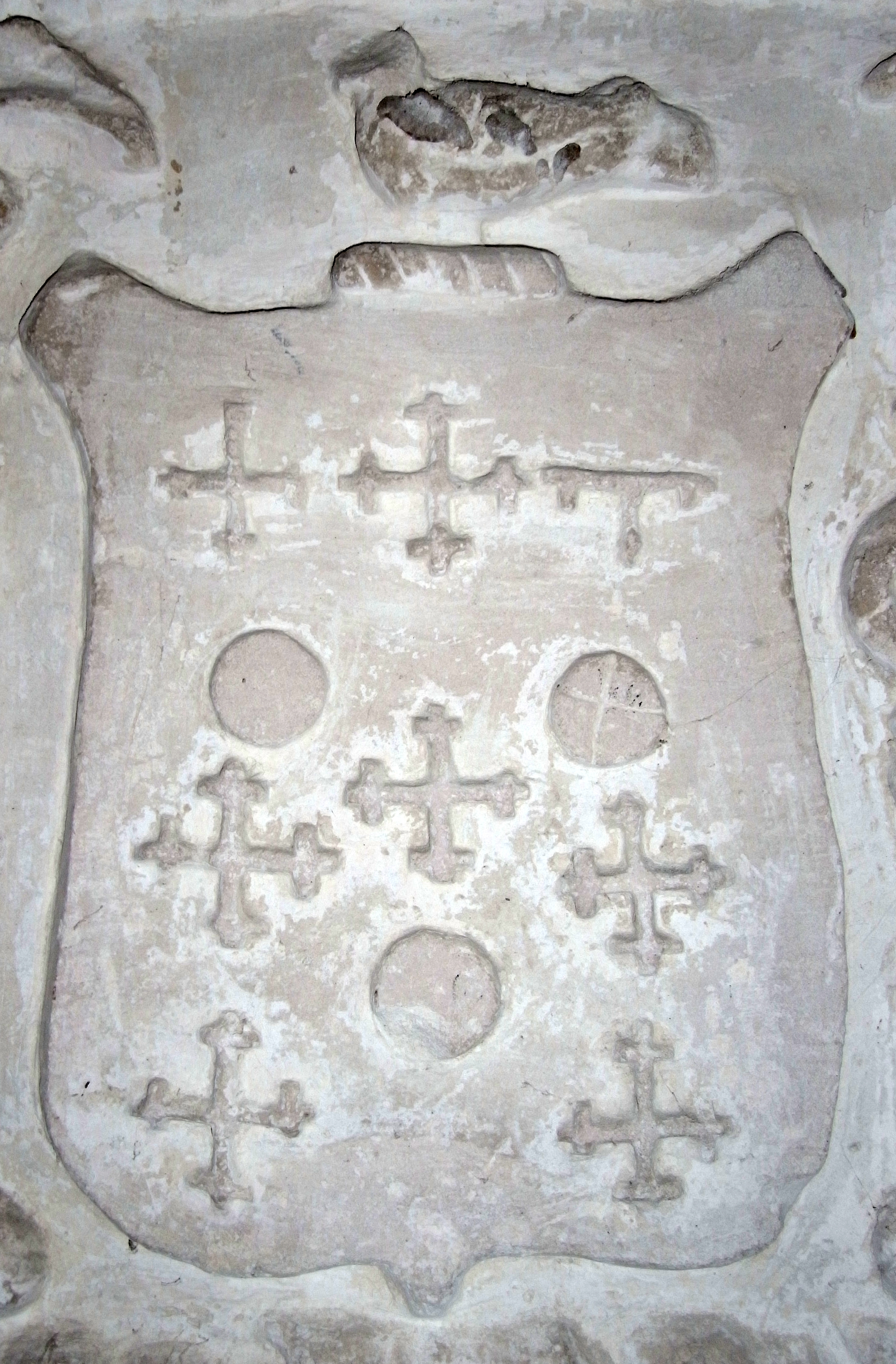
Arms of Coffin family, lords of the manor of Monkleigh

=== Other historic buildings ===
Some of the other historic buildings in Monkleigh include the early 19th century Monkleigh Millhouse; an early 19th-century country house, Petticombe Manor; Rudha Bridge Millhouse; The Bell Inn, originally built in the 17th century; and farmhouses, cottages, outbuildings, and bridges.

== Transport ==
Monkleigh is served by the A388 road, which runs south from Landcross, south of Bideford, in Devon through Holsworthy, Launceston and Callington to Saltash in Cornwall.

A ferry operates between Bideford Quay and Lundy Island, which lies about 22 miles (35 km) away in the Bristol Channel. The same ship, the MS Oldenburg, also provides evening cruises from Bideford along the River Torridge.

Bus routes in the area are provided by Stagecoach South West and MD Coaches; these are:

- 85 - Tavistock - Holsworthy - Barnstaple
- 642 - Northlew - Shebbear - Bideford
- 646 – Halwill Junction - Holsworthy - Barnstaple

The nearest railway stations are at Umberleigh, Chapelton and Barnstaple; these are stops on the Tarka line. Great Western Railway operates regular services to Exeter St Davids.

The nearest airports are Eaglescott Airfield and Exeter International Airport.

== Education ==
Monkleigh Primary School conducts 3 mixed age classes within the town of Monkleigh.

Other nearby schools are Langtree Community School And Nursery Unit, East-The-Water Community Primary School, Buckland Brewer Community Primary School, Pynes Infant School And Nursery and West Croft Junior School.

== Notable people ==
- William Hankford, Chief Justice of the King's Bench
- John St. Leger, Member of Parliament
- Walter de Stapeldon, Bishop of Exeter and Edward II's Lord High Treasurer
