= Lamerton =

Village in Devon, England

Coordinates: 50°34′N 4°11′W

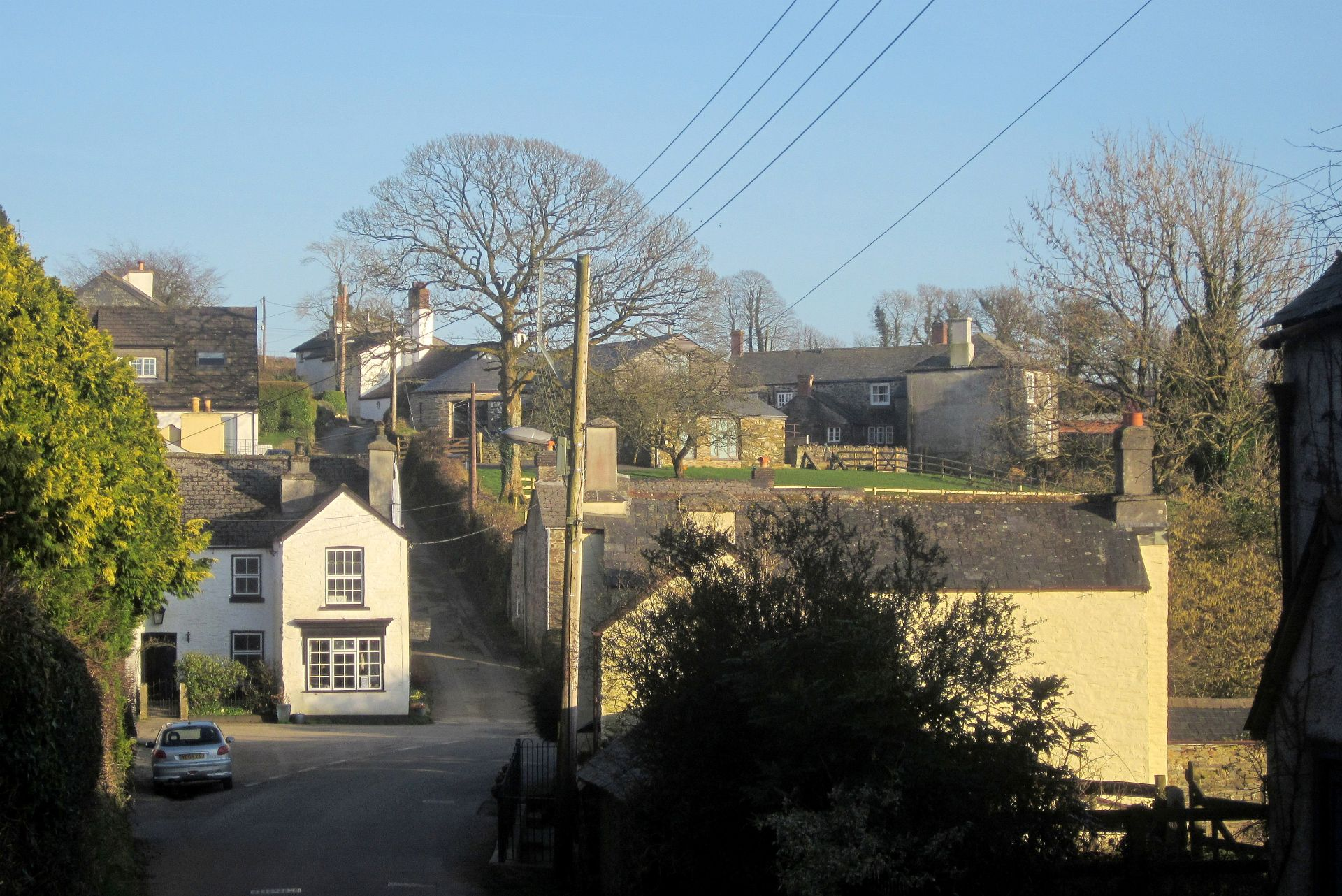

- Location within Devon
- Area: 0.2782 km^{2} (0.1074 sq mi)
- Population: 887 (2021 census)
  - Density: 3,188/km^{2} (8,260/sq mi)
- Civil parish: Lamerton
- District: West Devon
- Shire county: Devon
- Region: South West
- Country: England
- Sovereign state: United Kingdom

Lamerton /ˈlæmərtən/ is a village and civil parish located 3 miles north-west of the town of Tavistock, in the West Devon district, in the county of Devon, England. The village's school is called Lamerton Church of England Voluntary Controlled Primary School; affiliated with the Church of England, it enrols about 50 children aged 5–11. In 2021 it had a population of 887.

== Historic estates ==
The parish of Lamerton contains various historic estates including:

- Collacombe, long a seat of the Tremayne family, whose large monument dated 1588 survives in St Peter's parish church.
