= Torridge District Council elections =

Local government elections in Devon, England

Map showing the composition of Torridge District Council as of the last election in 2023. Conservatives in blue, Independents in grey, Liberal Democrats in yellow, Labour in red and Green party in green.

Current ward boundary map

Torridge District Council in Devon, England is elected every four years. Since the last boundary changes in 2003, 36 councillors have been elected from 23 wards.

== Summary results ==
Composition of the council
Year	Conservative	Labour	Liberal Democrats (Note: Includes totals for the predecessors of the Liberal Democrats, the Liberal Party and SDP (both of which participated in the Alliance).)	Green (Note: Includes totals for the predecessors of the Green Party of England and Wales, the Ecology Party and Green Party UK.)	UKIP	Independents & Others	Council control after election
Local government reorganisation; council established (36 seats)
1973	0	1	6	–	–	29	Independent
1976	3	5	6	0	–	22	Independent
New ward boundaries (36 seats)
1979	5	1	1	0	–	29	Independent
1983	3	1	3	0	–	29	Independent
1987	8	3	2	0	–	23	Independent
1991	5	4	4	0	–	23	Independent
1995	2	5	13	0	0	16	No overall control
1999	1	2	12	0	0	21	Independent
New ward boundaries (36 seats)
2003	1	0	7	1	1	27 (Note: 17 Independents, 9 Community Alliance)	No overall control
2007	13	0	8	2	0	13	No overall control
2011	18	1	6	1	0	10	No overall control
2015	19	1	1	2	7	6	Conservative
New ward boundaries (36 seats)
2019	11	3	2	2	0	18	No overall control
2023	6	2	8	4	0	16	No overall control

== District result maps ==
2003 results map

2007 results map

2011 results map

2015 results map

2019 results map

2023 results map

== By-election results ==
By-elections occur when seats become vacant between council elections. Below is a summary of recent by-elections; full by-election results can be found by clicking on the by-election name.

By-election	Date	Incumbent party	Winning party
Westward Ho! by-election	24 August 2000	Independent	Independent
Holsworthy by-election	20 September 2001	Independent	Independent
Bideford South by-election	4 December 2003	Liberal Democrats	Liberal Democrats
Westward Ho! by-election	4 November 2004	Independent	Independent
Tamarside by-election	14 July 2005	Independent	Independent
Northam by-election	23 November 2006	Independent	Conservative
Hartland and Bradworthy by-election	12 March 2009	Independent	Liberal Democrats
Holsworthy by-election	13 August 2009	Liberal Democrats	Independent
Shebbear and Langtree by-election	15 August 2013	Conservative	Conservative
Torrington by-election	5 September 2013	Liberal Democrats	Green
Bideford East by-election	20 March 2014	Independent	Independent
Kenwith by-election	10 July 2014	Independent	Conservative
Hartland and Bradworthy by-election	8 June 2017	UKIP	Liberal Democrats
Torrington by-election	30 November 2017	UKIP	Liberal Democrats
Westward Ho! by-election	14 December 2017	Conservative	Independent
Bideford East by-election	3 May 2018	UKIP	Conservative
Hartland and Bradworthy by-election	26 July 2018	Liberal Democrats	Conservative
Holsworthy by-election	8 November 2018	Conservative	Conservative
Northam by-election	9 December 2021	Independent	Conservative
Bideford North by-election	2 May 2024	Green	Liberal Democrats
Appledore by-election	17 April 2025	Independent	Liberal Democrats
Milton & Tamarside by-election	23 October 2025	Independent	Liberal Democrats
Winkleigh by-election	4 December 2025	Conservative	Liberal Democrats
