= 2011 Torridge District Council election =

2011 UK local government election

Map of the results of the 2011 Torridge District Council election. Conservatives in blue, Independents in grey, Liberal Democrats in yellow, Labour in red and Green Party in green.

The 2011 Torridge District Council election took place on 5 May 2011 to elect members of Torridge District Council in Devon, England. The whole council was up for election and the council stayed under no overall control.

== Background ==
At the previous election in 2007 no party won a majority on the council with 13 Conservative, 13 independent, 8 Liberal Democrats and 2 Green Party councillors elected. However between 2007 and 2011 there were a number of changes on the council, with 3 Liberal Democrat councillors, Caroline Church, Simon Inch and Tony Inch, quitting the party in July 2007 to sit as independents. All 3 would then join the Conservatives, with Simon and Tony Inch joining the Conservatives in April 2010 to back the local Conservative Member of Parliament Geoffrey Cox at the 2010 general election. There were also 2 by-elections in 2009, with the Liberal Democrats gaining a seat in Hartland and Bradworthy from an independent, but also losing a seat in Holsworthy to another independent.

11 of the 36 councillors stood down at the election, including the leader of the Conservative council James Morrish. A total of 80 candidates stood at the election for the 36 seats contested, 25 Conservatives, 23 Liberal Democrats, 18 independents, 6 Labour and 4 each from the Green Party and UK Independence Party. 3 independent candidates were elected with no opposition, Phil Pennington in Monkleigh and Littleham, Ken James in Tamarside and David Lausen in Winkleigh, down from 7 unopposed candidates at the 2007 election. Meanwhile, Len Ford, who had represented Appledore as a Liberal Democrat councillor, had left the party and contested Bideford East as an independent.

== Election result ==
The Conservatives won half of the seats on the council, falling 1 seat short of winning a majority. This was the closest any political party had come to having a majority since the first election to the council in 1973. Overall turnout at the election was 45.2%, up from 42.1% in 2007. This ranged from a high of 57.2% in Three Moors to a low of 32.3% in Bideford South.

Independents dropped to 10 councillors, while the Liberal Democrats rose to 6 seats and the Greens won 1 seat. Meanwhile, Labour won their first seat on the council since 2003, after David Brenton gained a seat in Bideford South from the mayor of Bideford, Conservative Philip Pester. He was one of 14 new councillors after the election.

Following the election Conservative Barry Parsons became the new leader of the council.

Torridge local election result 2011
Party	Seats	Gains	Losses	Net gain/loss	Seats %	Votes %	Votes	+/−
Conservative	18	3	1	+2	50.0	41.8	13,636	+10.9
Independent	10	0	4	-4	27.8	17.3	5,645	-10.5
Liberal Democrats	6	2	0	+2	16.7	26.2	8,545	-0.8
Labour	1	1	0	+1	2.8	6.8	2,207	+5.0
Green	1	0	1	-1	2.8	4.7	1,547	-4.7
UKIP	0	0	0	0	0.0	3.2	1,044	+0.1

== Ward results ==
Appledore (2 seats)
Party	Candidate	Votes	%	±%
Conservative	Andrew Eastman	576		
Independent	Barry Edwards	348		
UKIP	Kenneth Davis	283		
Liberal Democrats	Andrew Gill	264		
Conservative	James Jackson	252		
Green	Peter Hames	193		
Liberal Democrats	Benjamin Lee	87		
Turnout		2,003	51.6	+3.0
Conservative hold		Swing		
Independent hold		Swing		

Bideford East (3 seats)
Party	Candidate	Votes	%	±%
Conservative	Mervyn Langmead	609		
Conservative	Pauline Davies	553		
Independent	Stephen Clarke	445		
Liberal Democrats	Susan Rose	379		
UKIP	Gaston Dezart	365		
Labour	Ian Hopkins	289		
Independent	Leonard Ford	288		
Independent	Alan Rayner	184		
Turnout		3,112	34.9	−1.5
Conservative gain from Independent		Swing		
Conservative hold		Swing		
Independent hold		Swing		

Bideford North (3 seats)
Party	Candidate	Votes	%	±%
Green	Peter Christie	879		
Liberal Democrats	Trevor Johns	703		
Conservative	David Fulford	629		
Liberal Democrats	Hugo Barton	625		
Conservative	Mary Fulford	464		
Labour	Anne Brenton	445		
Independent	Emma Farrington	311		
Turnout		4,056	42.6	+7.8
Green hold		Swing		
Liberal Democrats hold		Swing		
Conservative hold		Swing		

Bideford South (3 seats)
Party	Candidate	Votes	%	±%
Conservative	Anthony Inch	503		
Conservative	Simon Inch	495		
Labour	David Brenton	484		
Conservative	Philip Pester	469		
Liberal Democrats	Robert Wootton	414		
Liberal Democrats	Mel Bushell	335		
Turnout		2,700	32.3	+4.5
Conservative hold		Swing		
Conservative hold		Swing		
Labour gain from Conservative		Swing		

Broadheath
Party	Candidate	Votes	%	±%
Conservative	Peter Watson	401	53.7	
Liberal Democrats	John Worden	346	46.3	
Majority		55	7.4	
Turnout		747	56.2	
Conservative hold		Swing		

Clinton
Party	Candidate	Votes	%	±%
Independent	Philip Collins	574	80.6	+22.5
Green	William Douglas-Mann	138	19.4	+19.4
Majority		436	61.2	+44.9
Turnout		712	55.6	+0.6
Independent hold		Swing		

Clovelly Bay
Party	Candidate	Votes	%	±%
Liberal Democrats	Adam Symons	481	67.9	
Conservative	Alison Boyle	227	32.1	
Majority		254	35.9	
Turnout		708	54.7	
Liberal Democrats gain from Independent		Swing		

Coham Bridge
Party	Candidate	Votes	%	±%
Conservative	Gloria Tabor	543	74.2	
Liberal Democrats	James Richardson	189	25.8	
Majority		354	48.4	
Turnout		732	56.4	
Conservative hold		Swing		

Forest
Party	Candidate	Votes	%	±%
Conservative	Barry Parsons	592	85.1	+25.0
Liberal Democrats	Julie Adnams-Hatch	104	14.9	+14.9
Majority		488	70.1	+49.9
Turnout		696	50.0	−1.7
Conservative hold		Swing		

Hartland and Bradworthy (2 seats)
Party	Candidate	Votes	%	±%
Liberal Democrats	Brian Redwood	494		
Liberal Democrats	Anna Dart	473		
Conservative	Anthony Brewington	401		
Independent	Andrea Chick	271		
Conservative	Michael Footitt	245		
UKIP	Robin Julian	188		
Green	Keith Funnell	177		
Turnout		2,249	53.2	+2.5
Liberal Democrats hold		Swing		
Liberal Democrats hold		Swing		

Holsworthy (2 seats)
Party	Candidate	Votes	%	±%
Conservative	Michael Footitt	741		
Liberal Democrats	Howard Ratledge	493		
Liberal Democrats	Charlene Le-Roy	489		
Turnout		1,723	41.4	−5.4
Conservative gain from Independent		Swing		
Liberal Democrats gain from Independent		Swing		

Kenwith
Party	Candidate	Votes	%	±%
Conservative	Kathy Murdoch	406	56.3	+1.8
Liberal Democrats	Karen Heard	162	22.5	+22.5
Labour	Geoffrey Hastings	153	21.2	+21.2
Majority		244	33.8	+24.8
Turnout		721	51.3	+4.5
Conservative hold		Swing		

Monkleigh and Littleham
Party	Candidate	Votes	%	±%
Independent	Phil Pennington	unopposed		
Independent hold		Swing		

Northam (3 seats)
Party	Candidate	Votes	%	±%
Conservative	Jane Whittaker	1,003		
Conservative	Roger Johnson	939		
Conservative	John Himan	924		
Liberal Democrats	David Berryman	589		
Liberal Democrats	Kay Renton	526		
Labour	David Rowe	524		
Turnout		4,505	43.5	+5.9
Conservative hold		Swing		
Conservative hold		Swing		
Conservative gain from Green		Swing		

Orchard Hill
Party	Candidate	Votes	%	±%
Independent	Christopher Leather	475	73.4	−2.0
Liberal Democrats	Benjamin Symons	172	26.6	+2.0
Majority		303	46.8	−4.0
Turnout		647	44.6	−0.6
Independent hold		Swing		

Shebbear and Langtree
Party	Candidate	Votes	%	±%
Conservative	John Lewis	468	63.2	+10.8
Liberal Democrats	John Watson	273	36.8	−10.8
Majority		195	26.3	+21.5
Turnout		741	49.2	−3.7
Conservative hold		Swing		

Tamarside
Party	Candidate	Votes	%	±%
Independent	Ken James	unopposed		
Independent hold		Swing		

Three Moors
Party	Candidate	Votes	%	±%
Conservative	Rosemary Lock	532	67.4	+4.8
Green	Colin Jones	160	20.3	+20.3
Liberal Democrats	Theresa Seligmann	97	12.3	−25.1
Majority		372	47.1	+21.9
Turnout		789	57.2	−7.6
Conservative hold		Swing		

Torrington (3 seats)
Party	Candidate	Votes	%	±%
Conservative	Andrew Boyd	809		
Independent	Margaret Brown	792		
Liberal Democrats	Geoffrey Lee	641		
Independent	David Cox	480		
Labour	Heathcliffe Pettifer	312		
Liberal Democrats	Robert Jollands	209		
UKIP	Shirley Griffin	208		
Turnout		3,451	38.8	+1.3
Conservative hold		Swing		
Independent hold		Swing		
Liberal Democrats hold		Swing		

Two Rivers
Party	Candidate	Votes	%	±%
Conservative	Harold Martin	465	61.3	
Independent	Adrian Freeland	294	38.7	
Majority		171	22.5	
Turnout		759	55.0	
Conservative hold		Swing		

Waldon
Party	Candidate	Votes	%	±%
Independent	Robert Hicks	382	54.2	
Independent	James Lowe	323	45.8	
Majority		59	8.4	
Turnout		705	51.9	
Independent hold		Swing		

Westward Ho!
Party	Candidate	Votes	%	±%
Independent	Roger Tisdale	478	55.1	+7.4
Conservative	Maria Bailey	390	44.9	+15.9
Majority		88	10.1	−8.5
Turnout		868	48.2	+6.7
Independent hold		Swing		

Winkleigh
Party	Candidate	Votes	%	±%
Independent	David Lausen	unopposed		
Independent hold		Swing		

== By-elections between 2011 and 2015 ==
=== Shebbear and Langtree ===
A by-election was held in Shebbear and Langtree ward on 15 August 2013 after Conservative councillor John Lewis resigned from the council. David Hurley held the seat for the Conservatives with a majority of 23 votes.

Shebbear and Langtree by-election 15 August 2013
Party	Candidate	Votes	%	±%
Conservative	David Hurley	240	47.2	−15.9
UKIP	Penny Mills	217	42.7	+42.7
Green	Colin Jones	41	8.1	+8.1
Independent	Bob Wooton	10	2.0	+2.0
Majority		23	4.5	−21.8
Turnout		508	32.0	−17.2
Conservative hold		Swing		

=== Torrington ===
A by-election was held in Torrington ward after Liberal Democrat councillor Geoff Lee resigned from the council due to leaving the area. The seat was gained for the Green Party by Cathrine Simmons with a majority of 111 votes.

Torrington by-election 5 September 2013
Party	Candidate	Votes	%	±%
Green	Cathrine Simmons	292	35.3	+35.3
UKIP	Robin Julian	181	21.9	+15.4
Independent	David Cox	160	19.3	−5.1
Independent	Adrian Freeland	106	12.8	−2.0
Conservative	Philip Pester	89	10.7	−14.2
Majority		111	13.4	
Turnout		828	19.3	−19.5
Green gain from Liberal Democrats		Swing		

=== Bideford East ===
A by-election was held in Bideford East ward on 20 March 2014 after the death of independent councillor Steve Clarke. The seat was won by another independent Sam Robinson by a majority of 145 votes.

Bideford East by-election 20 March 2014
Party	Candidate	Votes	%	±%
Independent	Samuel Robinson	295	39.5	+22.1
Conservative	Dermot McGeough	150	20.1	−3.7
Labour	James Craigie	140	18.7	+7.4
Independent	David Ratcliff	106	14.2	−3.2
Liberal Democrats	Robert Wootton	39	5.2	−9.6
Independent	Alan Smith	17	2.3	−15.1
Majority		145	19.4	
Turnout		747	15.6	−19.3
Independent hold		Swing		

=== Kenwith ===
A by-election was held on 10 July 2014 for Kenwith ward after independent councillor Kathy Murdoch resigned from the council. Kathy Murdoch had been elected as a Conservative but left the party to sit as an independent in June 2012. The seat was gained for the Conservatives by Alison Boyle with a majority of 37 votes.

Kenwith by-election 10 July 2014
Party	Candidate	Votes	%	±%
Conservative	Alison Boyle	136	29.8	−26.5
UKIP	Derek Sargent	99	21.7	+21.7
Independent	David Gale	98	21.5	+21.5
Independent	Hugh Bone	69	15.1	+15.1
Green	Simon Mathers	28	6.1	+6.1
Labour	Geoff Hastings	26	5.7	−15.5
Majority		37	8.1	−25.7
Turnout		456	32.0	−19.3
Conservative gain from Independent		Swing		
