= 2019 Torridge District Council election =

English local election

- 2 May 2019

All 36 seats to Torridge District Council 19 seats needed for a majority

	First party	Second party	Third party
Party	Independent	Conservative	Labour
Seats won	18	11	3
Seat change	▲12	▼8	▲2
Percentage	35.2%	29.2%	12.0%
	Fourth party	Fifth party
Party	Liberal Democrats	Green
Seats won	2	2
Seat change	▲1	Steady
Percentage	10.9%	8.9%
- Results map by ward
Council control before election
Conservative
Council control after the election
No overall control

The 2019 Torridge Council election took place on 2 May 2019 to elect members of Torridge District Council in England. This was on the same day as other local elections. The whole council was up for election on new boundaries.

== Summary ==
=== Election result ===
2019 Torridge District Council election
Party	Candidates	Seats	Gains	Losses	Net gain/loss	Seats %	Votes %	Votes	+/−
Independent	29	18	N/A	N/A	▲12	50.0	35.2	12,431	+18.4
Conservative	28	11	N/A	N/A	▼8	30.6	29.2	10,310	–8.8
Labour	19	3	N/A	N/A	▲2	8.3	12.0	4,238	+1.0
Liberal Democrats	11	2	N/A	N/A	▲1	5.6	10.9	3,848	+6.0
Green	7	2	N/A	N/A	Steady	5.6	8.9	3,151	–5.5
UKIP	6	0	N/A	N/A	▼7	0.0	3.9	1,369	–10.9

== Ward results ==
Incumbents are denoted by an asterisk (*)

=== Appledore ===
Appledore
Party	Candidate	Votes	%	±%
Independent	Leonard Ford	410	34.1	
Green	Peter Hames	391	32.5	
Conservative	Andrew Eastman*	379	31.5	
UKIP	Kenneth Davis*	285	23.7	
Liberal Democrats	David Chalmers	254	21.1	
Independent	Barry Edwards	207	17.2	
Conservative	James Jackson	128	10.6	
Majority				
Turnout		1,218	41.37	
Rejected ballots		16	1.3	
Registered electors		2,944		
Independent win (new seat)				
Green win (new seat)				

=== Bideford East ===
Bideford East
Party	Candidate	Votes	%	±%
Independent	Judith Gubb	407	36.2	
Labour	Ruth Craigie	330	29.3	
Independent	Jamie McKenzie	266	23.6	
Conservative	James Hellyer*	255	22.7	
Conservative	Linda Hellyer	249	22.1	
Labour	Ethne Brenton	234	20.8	
UKIP	Gaston Dezart*	215	19.1	
Conservative	Oliver Sherborne	187	16.6	
Green	Gregory de Freyne-Martin	183	16.3	
Independent	Pauline Davies	174	15.5	
Labour	Theodoros Plowman	167	14.8	
Liberal Democrats	Nicola Kennelly	136	12.1	
Majority				
Turnout		1,137	27.23	
Rejected ballots		12	1.1	
Registered electors		4,175		
Independent win (new seat)				
Labour win (new seat)				
Independent win (new seat)				

=== Bideford North ===
Bideford North
Party	Candidate	Votes	%	±%
Green	Peter Christie*	861	50.5	
Independent	Douglas Bushby	641	37.6	
Conservative	Dermot McGeough*	615	36.1	
Independent	Joel Herron	320	18.8	
Labour	Rosemary Arno	304	17.8	
Liberal Democrats	Trevor Johns*	301	17.7	
Independent	Ashley Cole	300	17.6	
Labour	Michael James	265	15.6	
Conservative	Morgan Fletcher	242	14.2	
Liberal Democrats	Stephen Potts	182	10.7	
Labour	Jason Noble	167	9.8	
Majority				
Turnout		1,721	37.65	
Rejected ballots		17	1.0	
Registered electors		4,571		
Green win (new seat)				
Independent win (new seat)				
Conservative win (new seat)				

=== Bideford South ===
Bideford South
Party	Candidate	Votes	%	±%
Labour	David Brenton*	206	32.1	
Labour	Shirley Langford	206	32.1	
Conservative	Simon Inch*	198	30.9	
Independent	Peter Lawrence	176	27.5	
Independent	Robert Wootton	153	23.9	
UKIP	Adam Conabere	111	17.3	
Liberal Democrats	Claire Davey-Potts	78	12.2	
Majority				
Turnout		653	26.97	
Rejected ballots		12	1.8	
Registered electors		2,421		
Labour win (new seat)				
Labour win (new seat)				

=== Bideford West ===
Bideford West
Party	Candidate	Votes	%	±%
Independent	Carl Hawkins	215	36.1	
Conservative	Anthony Inch*	197	33.1	
Independent	Alan Rayner	192	32.3	
Labour	Jake McLean	166	27.9	
Labour	Andrew Tithecott	129	21.7	
UKIP	Nigel Johnson	127	21.3	
Majority				
Turnout		603	28.09	
Rejected ballots		8	1.3	
Registered electors		2,147		
Independent win (new seat)				
Conservative win (new seat)				

=== Broadheath ===
Broadheath
Party	Candidate	Votes	%	±%
Independent	Peter Watson*	667	60.0	
Independent	Philip Hackett*	666	59.9	
Conservative	Zygmunt Gregorek*	350	31.5	
Conservative	Graeme Barriball	330	29.7	
Majority				
Turnout		1,138	34.77	
Rejected ballots		26	2.3	
Registered electors		3,273		
Independent win (new seat)				
Independent win (new seat)				

=== Great Torrington ===
Great Torrington
Party	Candidate	Votes	%	±%
Liberal Democrats	Cheryl Cottle-Hunkin*	908	64.9	
Liberal Democrats	Christopher Bright	552	39.4	
Independent	Margaret Brown*	526	37.6	
Green	Keith Funnell	332	23.7	
Labour	Diana Davey	328	23.4	
Independent	Jonathan Rose	258	18.4	
Labour	Siobhan Strode	225	16.1	
Independent	Douglas Smith	219	15.6	
Majority				
Turnout		1,416	32.27	
Rejected ballots		16	1.1	
Registered electors		4,388		
Liberal Democrats win (new seat)				
Liberal Democrats win (new seat)				
Independent win (new seat)				

=== Hartland ===
Hartland
Party	Candidate	Votes	%	±%
Conservative	Stephen Harding	656	37.2	
Conservative	Richard Boughton	650	36.9	
Independent	Anna Dart*	630	35.7	
Green	Mireille Thornton	571	32.4	
Independent	Robin Julian*	470	26.7	
Liberal Democrats	Martin Hill	463	26.3	
Conservative	Brian Redwood	460	26.1	
Labour	Dylan Billson	340	19.3	
Majority				
Turnout		1,776	38.14	
Rejected ballots		13	0.7	
Registered electors		4,657		
Conservative win (new seat)				
Conservative win (new seat)				
Independent win (new seat)				

=== Holsworthy ===
Holsworthy
Party	Candidate	Votes	%	±%
Conservative	Jonathan Hutchings*	607	74.0	
Conservative	David Jones	398	48.5	
Independent	Valentina Kassam	203	24.8	
Majority				
Turnout		839	33.91	
Rejected ballots		19	2.3	
Registered electors		2,474		
Conservative win (new seat)				
Conservative win (new seat)				

=== Milton & Tamarside ===
Milton & Tamarside
Party	Candidate	Votes	%	±%
Conservative	Kit Hepple	Unopposed	N/A	
Independent	Ken James*	Unopposed	N/A	
Turnout			N/A	
Conservative hold		Swing		
Independent hold		Swing		

=== Monkleigh & Putford ===
Monkleigh & Putford
Party	Candidate	Votes	%	±%
Independent	Philip Pennington*	737	60.3	
Independent	Robert Hicks*	659	53.9	
Green	Willam Douglas-Mann	319	26.1	
Conservative	Kenton Baker	237	19.4	
Conservative	Peter Haselhurst	182	14.9	
Majority				
Turnout		1,235	38.93	
Rejected ballots		13	1.1	
Registered electors		3,172		
Independent win (new seat)				
Independent win (new seat)				

=== Northam ===
Northam
Party	Candidate	Votes	%	±%
Independent	Christopher Leather	783	47.9	
Independent	Joanne Manley	602	36.8	
Independent	Giuseppe Rossi	539	33.0	
Conservative	John Himan*	381	23.3	
Conservative	Keith Lane	372	22.8	
UKIP	Richard Hancock*	305	18.7	
Conservative	William Gewanter	296	18.1	
Liberal Democrats	David Berryman	255	15.6	
Labour	John Coats	214	13.1	
Labour	Geoffrey Allen	209	12.8	
Labour	Brendan Montague	175	10.7	
Majority				
Turnout		1,662	40.20	
Rejected ballots		27	1.6	
Registered electors		4,134		
Independent win (new seat)				
Independent win (new seat)				
Independent win (new seat)				

=== Shebbear & Langtree ===
Shebbear & Langtree
Party	Candidate	Votes	%	±%
Conservative	David Hurley*	599	45.9	
Independent	Richard Wiseman*	486	37.2	
Liberal Democrats	Christopher Styles-Power	470	36.0	
Conservative	Rhys Matthews	420	32.2	
Labour	Gillian Tesh	210	16.1	
Majority				
Turnout		1,325	43.82	
Rejected ballots		20	1.5	
Registered electors		3,024		
Conservative win (new seat)				
Independent win (new seat)				

=== Two Rivers & Three Moors ===
Two Rivers & Three Moors
Party	Candidate	Votes	%	±%
Conservative	Rosemary Lock*	732	59.0	
Conservative	Michael Clarke	640	51.6	
Green	Colin Jones	494	39.8	
Labour	Anthony Goldstone	265	21.4	
Majority				
Turnout		1,272	38.85	
Rejected ballots		32	2.5	
Registered electors		3,274		
Conservative win (new seat)				
Conservative win (new seat)				

=== Westward Ho! ===
Westward Ho!
Party	Candidate	Votes	%	±%
Independent	Nicholas Laws*	953	77.1	
Independent	Claire Hodson	572	46.3	
UKIP	Derek Sargent	326	26.4	
Conservative	Carrie Woodhouse	231	18.7	
Majority				
Turnout		1,247	41.87	
Rejected ballots		11	0.9	
Registered electors		2,978		
Independent win (new seat)				
Independent win (new seat)				

=== Winkleigh ===
Winkleigh
Party	Candidate	Votes	%	±%
Conservative	Simon Newton	319	47.9	
Liberal Democrats	Stephen Middleton	249	37.4	
Labour	Angela Findlay	98	14.7	
Majority				
Turnout		688	40.52	
Rejected ballots		21	3.1	
Registered electors		1,698		
Conservative win (new seat)				

== By-elections ==
=== Northam ===
A by-election was held on 9 December 2021 after the resignation of independent councillor Giuseppe Rossi.

Northam by-election: 9 December 2021
Party	Candidate	Votes	%	±%
Conservative	Carrie Woodhouse	386	38.7	+15.4
Liberal Democrats	Sam Newman-McKie	230	23.1	+7.5
Green	Wendy Lo-Vel	224	22.5	N/A
Labour	Jennifer Radford	103	10.3	−2.8
Independent	Timothy Tennant	54	5.4	N/A
Majority		156	15.6	
Turnout		1,007	24.5	
Rejected ballots		10	1.0	
Registered electors		4,115		
Conservative gain from Independent		Swing		
