= 2007 Torridge District Council election =

2007 UK local government election

Map of the results of the 2007 Torridge District Council election. Conservatives in blue, Independents in grey, Liberal Democrats in yellow and Green Party in green.

The 2007 Torridge District Council election took place on 3 May 2007 to elect members of Torridge District Council in Devon, England. The whole council was up for election and independents lost overall control of the council to no overall control.

== Election result ==
The Conservatives gained 7 seats, while independents lost 9 seats to mean that no group had a majority on the council, with both the Conservatives and independents finishing on 13 councillors. The Conservative gains came after the number of candidates the party fielded increased from 4 at the 2003 election to 22 in 2007. Among the independents to lose their seats was the council leader Pat Ferguson, who was defeated in Bideford South after having previously represented Three Moors ward.

Meanwhile, the Liberal Democrats increased by 1 to 8 seats and the Greens also gained 1 seat to have 2 councillors. 7 councillors were elected unopposed, the highest number in the country at the 2007 local elections. Overall turnout at the election was 42.1%, up from 38.4% in 2003.

Following the election the leader of the Conservative group on the council, James Morrish, became the youngest leader of the council at the age of 34.

Torridge local election result 2007
Party	Seats	Gains	Losses	Net gain/loss	Seats %	Votes %	Votes	+/−
Conservative	13	7	0	+7	36.1	30.9	8,878	+26.3
Independent	13	0	9	-9	36.1	27.8	7,997	+0.5
Liberal Democrats	8	2	1	+1	22.2	27.0	7,777	+1.4
Green	2	1	0	+1	5.6	9.4	2,708	+6.0
UKIP	0	0	0	0	0.0	3.1	895	+1.4
Labour	0	0	0	0	0.0	1.8	520	-3.2

== Ward results ==
Appledore (2 seats)
Party	Candidate	Votes	%	±%
Conservative	Andrew Eastman	480		
Liberal Democrats	Leonard Ford	421		
Conservative	Alison Boyle	352		
Liberal Democrats	Val Robbins	349		
UKIP	Kenny Davis	191		
Green	Peter Hames	182		
Independent	Andy Harrison	134		
Turnout		2,109	48.6	+0.7
Conservative hold		Swing		
Liberal Democrats hold		Swing		

Bideford East (3 seats)
Party	Candidate	Votes	%	±%
Independent	Brian Lacey	678		
Liberal Democrats	Caroline Church	613		
Independent	Stephen Clarke	512		
Liberal Democrats	Bob Wootton	245		
Liberal Democrats	Angela Bone	244		
Independent	Gerald Waldron	225		
UKIP	Keith Kersey	173		
UKIP	Gaston Dezart	171		
Labour	Anne Brenton	152		
UKIP	David Johnson	115		
Labour	Sheila Bloomfield	86		
Turnout		3,214	36.4	+4.2
Independent hold		Swing		
Liberal Democrats gain from Independent		Swing		
Independent hold		Swing		

Bideford North (3 seats)
Party	Candidate	Votes	%	±%
Green	Peter Christie	740		
Conservative	David Fulford	614		
Liberal Democrats	Hugo Barton	549		
Liberal Democrats	Trevor Johns	471		
Conservative	Jim Jackson	430		
Green	Jon Hooper	377		
Liberal Democrats	Mel Bushell	359		
Turnout		3,540	34.8	+0.0
Green hold		Swing		
Conservative gain from Independent		Swing		
Liberal Democrats hold		Swing		

Bideford South (3 seats)
Party	Candidate	Votes	%	±%
Liberal Democrats	Tony Inch	433		
Liberal Democrats	Simon Inch	406		
Conservative	Philip Pester	344		
Conservative	Graham Jones	338		
Liberal Democrats	Clive Bone	321		
Labour	David Brenton	282		
Independent	Patricia Ferguson	270		
Independent	Chris Cornish	244		
Turnout		2,638	27.8	−0.8
Liberal Democrats hold		Swing		
Liberal Democrats hold		Swing		
Conservative gain from Independent		Swing		

Broadheath
Party	Candidate	Votes	%	±%
Conservative	Marion Perkin	unopposed		
Conservative hold		Swing		

Clinton
Party	Candidate	Votes	%	±%
Independent	Philip Collins	397	58.1	+23.9
Conservative	Ted Seath	286	41.9	+15.1
Majority		111	16.3	+9.0
Turnout		683	55.0	−0.1
Independent hold		Swing		

Clovelly Bay
Party	Candidate	Votes	%	±%
Independent	Royston Johns	unopposed		
Independent hold		Swing		

Coham Bridge
Party	Candidate	Votes	%	±%
Conservative	Gaye Tabor	unopposed		
Conservative hold		Swing		

Forest
Party	Candidate	Votes	%	±%
Conservative	Barry Parsons	422	60.1	
Independent	Chris March	280	39.9	
Majority		142	20.2	
Turnout		702	51.7	
Conservative gain from Independent		Swing		

Hartland and Bradworthy (2 seats)
Party	Candidate	Votes	%	±%
Liberal Democrats	Adam Symons	657		
Independent	Bill Pillman	598		
Independent	Trevor Sillifant	363		
UKIP	Robin Julian	245		
Green	Anne Rix	195		
Turnout		2,058	50.7	
Liberal Democrats gain from Independent		Swing		
Independent hold		Swing		

Holsworthy (2 seats)
Party	Candidate	Votes	%	±%
Liberal Democrats	Desmond Shadrick	710		
Independent	Richard Brown	558		
Independent	John Allen	384		
Conservative	Geoffrey Broyd	348		
Conservative	Jamie Zambuni	278		
Independent	Richard Kennedy	236		
Turnout		2,514	46.8	+6.3
Liberal Democrats hold		Swing		
Independent gain from Independent		Swing		

Kenwith
Party	Candidate	Votes	%	±%
Conservative	Tony Collins	333	54.5	+54.5
Independent	Hugh Bone	278	45.5	−7.1
Majority		55	9.0	
Turnout		611	46.8	+7.4
Conservative gain from Independent		Swing		

Monkleigh and Littleham
Party	Candidate	Votes	%	±%
Independent	Philip Pennington	351	57.5	
Conservative	George Clinch	259	42.5	
Majority		92	15.1	
Turnout		610	52.2	
Independent hold		Swing		

Northam (3 seats)
Party	Candidate	Votes	%	±%
Conservative	Sam Robinson	894		
Conservative	Roger Johnson	888		
Green	Miranda Cox	862		
Conservative	Chas Langton	837		
Liberal Democrats	Sue Miller	578		
Turnout		4,069	37.6	−2.4
Conservative hold		Swing		
Conservative hold		Swing		
Green gain from Independent		Swing		

Orchard Hill
Party	Candidate	Votes	%	±%
Independent	Chris Leather	475	75.4	+22.5
Liberal Democrats	Humphrey Temperley	155	24.6	+24.6
Majority		320	50.8	+45.0
Turnout		630	45.2	+4.4
Independent hold		Swing		

Shebbear and Langtree
Party	Candidate	Votes	%	±%
Conservative	Andrew Saywell	411	52.4	+52.4
Liberal Democrats	Allin Bewes	373	47.6	−15.7
Majority		38	4.8	
Turnout		784	52.9	+5.3
Conservative gain from Liberal Democrats		Swing		

Tamarside
Party	Candidate	Votes	%	±%
Independent	Kenneth James	unopposed		
Independent hold		Swing		

Three Moors
Party	Candidate	Votes	%	±%
Conservative	Rosemary Lock	546	62.6	
Liberal Democrats	Adrian Freeland	326	37.4	
Majority		220	25.2	
Turnout		872	64.8	
Conservative gain from Independent		Swing		

Torrington (3 seats)
Party	Candidate	Votes	%	±%
Independent	Margaret Brown	693		
Conservative	Andy Boyd	620		
Liberal Democrats	Geoff Lee	495		
Independent	Richard Rumbold	490		
Independent	Judd Bond	476		
Green	Cathrine Simmons	352		
Independent	David Cox	179		
Turnout		3,305	37.5	+9.7
Independent hold		Swing		
Conservative gain from Independent		Swing		
Liberal Democrats hold		Swing		

Two Rivers
Party	Candidate	Votes	%	±%
Conservative	James Morrish	unopposed		
Conservative hold		Swing		

Waldon
Party	Candidate	Votes	%	±%
Independent	Bob Hicks	unopposed		
Independent hold		Swing		

Westward Ho!
Party	Candidate	Votes	%	±%
Independent	Roger Tisdale	325	47.7	+5.3
Conservative	Susan Collins	198	29.0	+29.0
Independent	Hazel Bissessar	87	12.8	+12.8
Liberal Democrats	Myrna Bushell	72	10.6	+10.6
Majority		127	18.6	+3.4
Turnout		682	41.5	−4.1
Independent hold		Swing		

Winkleigh
Party	Candidate	Votes	%	±%
Independent	David Lausen	unopposed		
Independent hold		Swing		

== By-elections between 2007 and 2011 ==
=== Hartland and Bradworthy ===
A by-election was held in Hartland and Bradworthy ward after the death of the longest serving councillor in Torridge, Bill Pillman, who had first stood for the council in 1976. The seat was gained for the Liberal Democrats by Brian Redwood by a majority of 469 votes.

Hartland and Bradworthy by-election 12 March 2009
Party	Candidate	Votes	%	±%
Liberal Democrats	Brian Redwood	786	63.4	+31.5
Conservative	Simon Goaman	317	25.6	+25.6
UKIP	Robin Julian	103	8.3	−3.6
Independent	Clifford Pryor	33	2.7	−26.4
Majority		469	37.8	
Turnout		1,239	51.0	+0.3
Liberal Democrats gain from Independent		Swing		

=== Holsworthy ===
Independent Pam Johns won a by-election in Holsworthy with a majority of 66 votes after the death of Liberal Democrat councillor Des Shadrick.

Holsworthy by-election 13 August 2009
Party	Candidate	Votes	%	±%
Independent	Pam Johns	537	53.3	+18.7
Liberal Democrats	Vicky Spearman	471	46.7	+2.8
Majority		66	6.5	
Turnout		1,008	31.8	−15.0
Independent gain from Liberal Democrats		Swing		
