= 2015 Torridge District Council election =

2015 UK local government election

Map of the results of the 2015 Torridge District Council election. Conservatives in blue, Independents in grey, Liberal Democrats in yellow, Labour in red, UKIP in purple, and Green Party in green.

The 2015 Torridge District Council election took place on 7 May 2015 to elect members of Torridge District Council in England. This was on the same day as other local elections and the 2015 UK General Election, hence turnout was much higher than usual in Local Elections.

== Results summary ==
2015 Torridge District Council election
| Party | Candidates | Seats | Gains | Losses | Net gain/loss | Seats % | Votes % | Votes | +/− |
|---|---|---|---|---|---|---|---|---|---|
| Conservative | 24 | 19 | 4 | 3 | ▲1 | 52.8 | 34.2 | 13,020 | –3.6 |
| Independent | 15 | 6 | 1 | 5 | ▼4 | 16.7 | 20.6 | 7,854 | +1.5 |
| Green | 14 | 2 | 1 | 0 | ▲1 | 5.6 | 16.0 | 6,085 | +9.7 |
| UKIP | 11 | 7 | 7 | 0 | ▲7 | 19.4 | 14.2 | 5,417 | +10.0 |
| Labour | 8 | 1 | 0 | 0 | Steady | 2.8 | 8.9 | 3,386 | -0.1 |
| Liberal Democrats | 4 | 1 | 0 | 5 | ▼5 | 2.8 | 6.0 | 2,287 | -17.6 |

== Results by ward ==
=== Appledore ===
Appledore (2 Seats)
| Party | Candidate | Votes | % |
|---|---|---|---|
| Conservative | Andrew Eastman | 791 | |
| UKIP | Kenneth Davis | 548 | |
| Green | Peter Hames | 426 | |
| Independent | Barry Edwards | 382 | |
| Conservative | James Jackson | 314 | |
| Turnout | | | 70.5 |
| Conservative hold | | | |
| UKIP gain from Independent | | | |

=== Bideford East ===
Bideford East (3 seats)
| Party | Candidate | Votes | % |
|---|---|---|---|
| Conservative | Mervyn Langmead | 1378 | |
| UKIP | Sam Robinson | 935 | |
| UKIP | Gaston Dezart | 845 | |
| Labour | Ruth Craigie | 709 | |
| Independent | Pauline Davies | 569 | |
| Green | Stephen Pagett | 561 | |
| Turnout | | | 61.11 |
| Conservative hold | | | |
| UKIP gain from Conservative | | | |
| UKIP gain from Independent | | | |

=== Bideford North ===
Bideford North (3 seats)
| Party | Candidate | Votes | % |
|---|---|---|---|
| Green | Peter Christie | 1313 | |
| Conservative | Dermot McGeough | 928 | |
| Liberal Democrats | Trevor Johns | 843 | |
| Conservative | Philip Pester | 763 | |
| Independent | Douglas Bushby | 634 | |
| Labour | Anne Brenton | 616 | |
| Labour | Michael James | 536 | |
| Turnout | | | 65.33 |
| Green hold | | | |
| Conservative hold | | | |
| Liberal Democrats hold | | | |

=== Bideford South ===
Bideford South (3 seats)
| Party | Candidate | Votes | % |
|---|---|---|---|
| Conservative | Simon Inch | 947 | |
| Conservative | Anthony Inch | 932 | |
| Labour | David Brenton | 801 | |
| Liberal Democrats | Robert Wootton | 798 | |
| Labour | Joseph Day | 636 | |
| Labour | James Craigie | 594 | |
| Turnout | | | 57.75 |
| Conservative hold | | | |
| Conservative hold | | | |
| Labour hold | | | |

=== Broadheath ===
Broadheath
| Party | Candidate | Votes | % |
|---|---|---|---|
| Conservative | Peter Watson | Uncontested | |
| Conservative hold | | | |

=== Clinton ===
Clinton
| Party | Candidate | Votes | % |
|---|---|---|---|
| Independent | Richard Wiseman | 618 | |
| Green | William Douglas-Mann | 333 | |
| Turnout | | | 77.15 |
| Independent hold | | | |

=== Clovelly Bay ===
Clovelly Bay
| Party | Candidate | Votes | % |
|---|---|---|---|
| UKIP | Robin Julian | Uncontested | |
| Turnout | | | |
| UKIP gain from Liberal Democrats | | | |

=== Coham Bridge ===
Coham Bridge
| Party | Candidate | Votes | % |
|---|---|---|---|
| Conservative | Philip Hackett | 703 | |
| Independent | Gloria Tabor | 368 | |
| Turnout | | | 82.17 |
| Conservative hold | | | |

=== Forest ===
Forest
| Party | Candidate | Votes | % |
|---|---|---|---|
| Conservative | Zygmunt Gregorek | 694 | |
| Green | Jonathan Middleton | 333 | |
| Turnout | | | 74.98 |
| Conservative hold | | | |

=== Hartland and Bradworthy ===
Hartland and Bradworthy (2 seats)
| Party | Candidate | Votes | % |
|---|---|---|---|
| Independent | Anna Dart | 1114 | |
| UKIP | Alan Whittle | 598 | |
| Green | Jill Maynard | 567 | |
| Turnout | | | 71.9 |
| Independent gain from Liberal Democrats | | | |
| UKIP gain from Liberal Democrats | | | |

=== Holsworthy ===
Holsworthy (2 seats)
| Party | Candidate | Votes | % |
|---|---|---|---|
| Conservative | Ian Parker | 1194 | |
| Conservative | Kenith Carroll | 816 | |
| UKIP | Brian Alchorn | 629 | |
| Liberal Democrats | Howard Ratledge | 464 | |
| Green | John Sanders | 371 | |
| Turnout | | | 69.44 |
| Conservative hold | | | |
| Conservative gain from Liberal Democrats | | | |

=== Kenwith ===
Kenwith
| Party | Candidate | Votes | % |
|---|---|---|---|
| Conservative | Alison Boyle | 656 | |
| UKIP | Derek Sargent | 299 | |
| Turnout | | | 74.29 |
| Conservative hold | | | |

=== Monkleigh and Littleham ===
Monkleigh and Littleham
| Party | Candidate | Votes | % |
|---|---|---|---|
| Independent | Phil Pennington | 410 | |
| Conservative | Benjamin Parry | 346 | |
| Green | Ruth Funnell | 192 | |
| Turnout | | | 77.38 |
| Independent hold | | | |

=== Northam ===
Northam (3 seats)
| Party | Candidate | Votes | % |
|---|---|---|---|
| Conservative | Jane Whittaker | 1,285 | |
| Conservative | John Himan | 1,162 | |
| UKIP | Richard Hancock | 1,062 | |
| Independent | Richard Miller | 945 | |
| Labour | Irene Rowe | 764 | |
| Turnout | | | 69.86 |
| Conservative hold | | | |
| Conservative hold | | | |
| UKIP gain from Conservative | | | |

=== Orchard Hill ===
Orchard Hill
| Party | Candidate | Votes | % |
|---|---|---|---|
| Conservative | John Langton-Lockton | 515 | |
| UKIP | Christopher Leather | 505 | |
| Turnout | | | 74.14 |
| Conservative gain from Independent | | | |

=== Shebbear and Langtree ===
Shebbear and Langtree
| Party | Candidate | Votes | % |
|---|---|---|---|
| Conservative | David Hurley | 900 | |
| Green | Gillian Douglas-Mann | 290 | |
| Turnout | | | 76.42 |
| Conservative hold | | | |

=== Tamarside ===
Tamarside
| Party | Candidate | Votes | % |
|---|---|---|---|
| Independent | Kenneth James | Uncontested | |
| Independent hold | | | |

=== Three Moors ===
Three Moors
| Party | Candidate | Votes | % |
|---|---|---|---|
| Conservative | Rosemary Lock | 705 | |
| Green | Colin Jones | 335 | |
| Turnout | | | 76.52 |
| Conservative hold | | | |

=== Torrington ===
Torrington (3 seats)
| Party | Candidate | Votes | % |
|---|---|---|---|
| Independent | Margaret Brown | 986 | |
| Green | Cathrine Simmons | 901 | |
| UKIP | Roger Darch | 841 | |
| Conservative | Sharon Claydon | 786 | |
| Conservative | Harold Martin | 736 | |
| UKIP | John Pitts | 659 | |
| Green | Keith Funnell | 627 | |
| Labour | Penelope Hewitt | 496 | |
| Turnout | | | 64.65 |
| Independent hold | | | |
| Green gain from Conservative | | | |
| UKIP gain from Liberal Democrats | | | |

=== Two Rivers ===
Two Rivers
| Party | Candidate | Votes | % |
|---|---|---|---|
| Conservative | James Morrish | Uncontested | |
| Conservative hold | | | |

=== Waldon ===
Waldon
| Party | Candidate | Votes | % |
|---|---|---|---|
| Independent | Robert Hicks | 572 | |
| Independent | James Lowe | 427 | |
| Turnout | | | 75.82 |
| Independent hold | | | |

=== Westward Ho! ===
Westward Ho!
| Party | Candidate | Votes | % |
|---|---|---|---|
| Conservative | Peter le Maistre | 528 | |
| Independent | Roger Tisdale | 473 | |
| Green | Christopher Jordan | 311 | |
| Turnout | | | 71.20 |
| Conservative gain from Independent | | | |

=== Winkleigh ===
Winkleigh
| Party | Candidate | Votes | % |
|---|---|---|---|
| Conservative | Betty Boundy | 664 | |
| Independent | Gail Flockhart | 356 | |
| Liberal Democrats | John Kane | 182 | |
| Green | Jacob Glanville | 152 | |
| Turnout | | | 77.97 |
| Conservative gain from Independent | | | |

== By-elections ==
=== Hartland and Bradworthy (8 June 2017) ===
Hartland and Bradworthy by-election 8 June 2017
| Party | Candidate | Votes | % | ±% |
|---|---|---|---|---|
| Liberal Democrats | Jane Leaper | 973 | 57.5 | +57.5 |
| Green | John Sanders | 720 | 42.5 | +17.6 |
| Majority | | 253 | 14.9 | |
| Turnout | | 1,693 | | |
| Liberal Democrats gain from UKIP | | Swing | | |

=== Torrington (30 November 2017) ===
Torrington by-election 30 November 2017
| Party | Candidate | Votes | % | ±% |
|---|---|---|---|---|
| Liberal Democrats | Cheryl Cottle-Hunkin | 701 | 60.2 | +60.2 |
| Independent | Di Davey | 180 | 15.5 | +15.5 |
| Conservative | Harold Martin | 159 | 13.6 | −6.0 |
| Green | Sue Clarke | 76 | 6.5 | −16.0 |
| UKIP | John Pitts | 49 | 4.2 | −16.8 |
| Majority | | 521 | 44.7 | |
| Turnout | | 1,165 | | |
| Liberal Democrats gain from UKIP | | Swing | | |

=== Westward Ho! (14 December 2017) ===
Westward Ho! by-election 30 November 2017
| Party | Candidate | Votes | % | ±% |
|---|---|---|---|---|
| Independent | Nick Laws | 321 | 46.9 | +46.9 |
| Conservative | Roger Levick | 128 | 18.7 | −21.5 |
| UKIP | Derek Sargent | 90 | 13.2 | +13.2 |
| Liberal Democrats | Stephen Potts | 63 | 9.2 | +9.2 |
| Independent | Barry Mason | 47 | 6.9 | +6.9 |
| Labour | Stan Coats | 35 | 5.1 | +5.1 |
| Majority | | 193 | 28.2 | |
| Turnout | | 684 | | |
| Independent gain from Conservative | | Swing | | |

=== Bideford East (3 May 2018) ===
Bideford East by-election 3 May 2018
| Party | Candidate | Votes | % | ±% |
|---|---|---|---|---|
| Conservative | James Hellyer | 383 | 30.9 | −2.3 |
| Labour | Anne Brenton | 273 | 22.0 | +4.9 |
| Liberal Democrats | Jamie McKenzie | 236 | 19.0 | +19.0 |
| Independent | Jude Gubb | 231 | 18.6 | +18.6 |
| Green | Gregory de Freyne-Martin | 62 | 5.0 | −8.5 |
| Independent | Pauline Davies | 56 | 4.5 | −9.2 |
| Majority | | 110 | 8.9 | |
| Turnout | | 1,241 | | |
| Conservative gain from UKIP | | Swing | | |

=== Hartland and Bradworthy (26 July 2018) ===
Hartland and Bradworthy by-election 26 July 2018
| Party | Candidate | Votes | % | ±% |
|---|---|---|---|---|
| Conservative | Richard Boughton | 408 | 58.5 | +58.5 |
| Liberal Democrats | Martin Hill | 204 | 29.3 | −28.2 |
| Green | John Sanders | 85 | 12.2 | −30.3 |
| Majority | | 204 | 29.3 | |
| Turnout | | 697 | | |
| Conservative gain from Liberal Democrats | | Swing | | |

=== Holsworthy (8 November 2018) ===
Holsworthy by-election 8 November 2018
| Party | Candidate | Votes | % | ±% |
|---|---|---|---|---|
| Conservative | Jon Hutchings | 698 | 56.4 | +11.5 |
| Independent | John Allen | 314 | 25.4 | +25.4 |
| Liberal Democrats | Christopher Styles-Power | 151 | 12.2 | −5.3 |
| Labour | Tom Hammett | 75 | 6.1 | +6.1 |
| Majority | | 384 | 31.0 | |
| Turnout | | 1,238 | | |
| Conservative hold | | Swing | | |
