= 2003 Torridge District Council election =

2003 UK local government election

Map of the results of the 2003 Torridge District Council election. Independents in grey, Community Alliance Independent in pink, Liberal Democrats in yellow, Conservatives in blue, Green Party in green and UK Independence Party in purple.

The 2003 Torridge District Council election took place on 1 May 2003 to elect members of Torridge District Council in Devon, England. The whole council was up for election after boundary changes and the council stayed under no overall control.

== Election result ==
A newly formed group called the Community Alliance gained 9 seats on the council and they were among 17 new councillors on the council. Among the gains for the Community Alliance were 3 seats in Northam ward, a seat in Bideford South from Labour and a gain from an independent in Westward Ho!. None of the candidates for the Community Alliance were sitting councillors and the group said it aimed to "keep party politics out of local government".

Meanwhile, Labour lost both their 2 seats on the council, while the Conservatives and Greens regained 1 seat each. 8 councillors were elected without facing any opposition, but this was down from 9 at the 1999 election and 13 in 1995. Overall turnout at the election was 38.4%, up from 36.1% in 1999.

Torridge local election result 2003
| Party | Seats | Gains | Losses | Net gain/loss | Seats % | Votes % | Votes | +/− |
|---|---|---|---|---|---|---|---|---|
| Independent | 17 | | | | 47.2 | 27.3 | 6,849 | -7.7 |
| Community Alliance Independent | 9 | | | +9 | 25.0 | 32.4 | 8,109 | +32.4 |
| Liberal Democrats | 7 | | | | 19.4 | 25.6 | 6,409 | -11.5 |
| Conservative | 1 | | | +1 | 2.8 | 4.6 | 1,165 | +3.5 |
| Green | 1 | | | +1 | 2.8 | 3.4 | 845 | -3.1 |
| UKIP | 1 | | | +1 | 2.8 | 1.7 | 427 | +1.7 |
| Labour | 0 | | | -2 | 0.0 | 5.0 | 1,257 | -15.2 |

== Ward results ==
Appledore (2 seats)
| Party | Candidate | Votes | % | ±% |
|---|---|---|---|---|
| Liberal Democrats | Leonard Ford | 506 | | |
| UKIP | Andrew Eastman | 427 | | |
| Independent | Philip Waters | 421 | | |
| Community Alliance Independent | Jeremy Bell | 402 | | |
| Liberal Democrats | Colin Langbridge | 141 | | |
| Turnout | | 1,897 | 47.9 | |

Bideford East (3 seats)
| Party | Candidate | Votes | % | ±% |
|---|---|---|---|---|
| Community Alliance Independent | Stephen Clarke | 653 | | |
| Community Alliance Independent | William Isaac | 516 | | |
| Independent | Pamela Paddon | 482 | | |
| Community Alliance Independent | Andrew Powell | 461 | | |
| Liberal Democrats | Noel Deakes | 293 | | |
| Liberal Democrats | Christopher Birchmore | 284 | | |
| Liberal Democrats | David Nicholson | 161 | | |
| Labour | Anne Brenton | 158 | | |
| Labour | Lynda Dark | 144 | | |
| Labour | Sarah Lovera | 87 | | |
| Turnout | | 3,239 | 32.2 | |

Bideford North (3 seats)
| Party | Candidate | Votes | % | ±% |
|---|---|---|---|---|
| Green | Peter Christie | 633 | | |
| Liberal Democrats | Hugo Barton | 632 | | |
| Community Alliance Independent | Alasdair Gould | 488 | | |
| Independent | Christopher Leather | 486 | | |
| Liberal Democrats | John Hadfield | 426 | | |
| Liberal Democrats | Matthew Osborne | 338 | | |
| Conservative | Graham Jones | 336 | | |
| Turnout | | 3,339 | 34.8 | |

Bideford South (3 seats)
| Party | Candidate | Votes | % | ±% |
|---|---|---|---|---|
| Liberal Democrats | Mervyn Lane | 494 | | |
| Community Alliance Independent | Sonia Bushby | 424 | | |
| Liberal Democrats | David Daniel | 354 | | |
| Liberal Democrats | Anthony Inch | 344 | | |
| Community Alliance Independent | David Ratcliff | 310 | | |
| Labour | David Brenton | 309 | | |
| Community Alliance Independent | Elliot Gould | 309 | | |
| Labour | Ian Hopkins | 131 | | |
| Labour | Walter Hill-Paul | 106 | | |
| Turnout | | 2,781 | 28.6 | |

Broadheath
| Party | Candidate | Votes | % | ±% |
|---|---|---|---|---|
| Independent | Frank Howard | unopposed | | |

Clinton
| Party | Candidate | Votes | % | ±% |
|---|---|---|---|---|
| Independent | Philip Collins | 228 | 34.2 | |
| Liberal Democrats | Richard Copp | 179 | 26.8 | |
| Conservative | Roy Watts | 179 | 26.8 | |
| Independent | Brian Stacey | 81 | 12.1 | |
| Majority | | 49 | 7.3 | |
| Turnout | | 667 | 55.1 | |

Clovelly Bay
| Party | Candidate | Votes | % | ±% |
|---|---|---|---|---|
| Independent | Royston Johns | unopposed | | |

Coham Bridge
| Party | Candidate | Votes | % | ±% |
|---|---|---|---|---|
| Conservative | Geoffrey Broyd | 294 | 56.1 | |
| Community Alliance Independent | Richard Deane | 230 | 43.9 | |
| Majority | | 64 | 12.2 | |
| Turnout | | 524 | 42.6 | |

Forest
| Party | Candidate | Votes | % | ±% |
|---|---|---|---|---|
| Independent | Christine March | unopposed | | |

Hartland and Bradworthy (2 seats)
| Party | Candidate | Votes | % | ±% |
|---|---|---|---|---|
| Independent | William Pillman | unopposed | | |
| Independent | Trevor Sillifant | unopposed | | |

Holsworthy (2 seats)
| Party | Candidate | Votes | % | ±% |
|---|---|---|---|---|
| Liberal Democrats | Desmond Shadrick | 784 | | |
| Independent | John Allen | 581 | | |
| Conservative | Coral Broyd | 356 | | |
| Turnout | | 1,721 | 40.5 | |

Kenwith
| Party | Candidate | Votes | % | ±% |
|---|---|---|---|---|
| Community Alliance Independent | Hugh Bone | 263 | 52.6 | |
| Independent | Anthony Collins | 237 | 47.4 | |
| Majority | | 26 | 5.2 | |
| Turnout | | 500 | 39.4 | |

Monkleigh and Littleham
| Party | Candidate | Votes | % | ±% |
|---|---|---|---|---|
| Independent | Geoffrey Boundy | unopposed | | |

Northam (3 seats)
| Party | Candidate | Votes | % | ±% |
|---|---|---|---|---|
| Community Alliance Independent | Alan Eastwood | 941 | | |
| Community Alliance Independent | Edward Davies | 926 | | |
| Community Alliance Independent | Paul Sturges | 850 | | |
| Independent | Richard Bradford | 640 | | |
| Independent | Anthony Barnes | 525 | | |
| Labour | Sheila Bloomfield | 322 | | |
| Turnout | | 4,204 | 40.0 | |

Orchard Hill
| Party | Candidate | Votes | % | ±% |
|---|---|---|---|---|
| Independent | Susan Mounce | 285 | 52.9 | |
| Community Alliance Independent | Matthew Richards | 254 | 47.1 | |
| Majority | | 31 | 5.8 | |
| Turnout | | 539 | 40.8 | |

Shebbear and Langtree
| Party | Candidate | Votes | % | ±% |
|---|---|---|---|---|
| Liberal Democrats | Allin Bewes | 389 | 63.3 | |
| Community Alliance Independent | Richard Clark | 226 | 36.7 | |
| Majority | | 163 | 26.5 | |
| Turnout | | 615 | 47.6 | |

Tamarside
| Party | Candidate | Votes | % | ±% |
|---|---|---|---|---|
| Independent | Richard Broad | unopposed | | |

Three Moors
| Party | Candidate | Votes | % | ±% |
|---|---|---|---|---|
| Independent | Patricia Ferguson | unopposed | | |

Torrington (3 seats)
| Party | Candidate | Votes | % | ±% |
|---|---|---|---|---|
| Independent | Margaret Brown | 645 | | |
| Independent | Richard Bond | 424 | | |
| Liberal Democrats | John Rawlinson | 376 | | |
| Liberal Democrats | William Brook | 364 | | |
| Independent | Richard Rumbold | 254 | | |
| Liberal Democrats | Adrian Freeland | 243 | | |
| Green | Cathrine Simmons | 212 | | |
| Turnout | | 2,518 | 27.8 | |

Two Rivers
| Party | Candidate | Votes | % | ±% |
|---|---|---|---|---|
| Independent | James Morrish | 253 | 43.5 | |
| Independent | William Tanton | 154 | 26.5 | |
| Liberal Democrats | Maurice Ridd | 101 | 17.4 | |
| Community Alliance Independent | Patrick Adams | 74 | 12.7 | |
| Majority | | 99 | 17.0 | |
| Turnout | | 582 | 46.9 | |

Waldon
| Party | Candidate | Votes | % | ±% |
|---|---|---|---|---|
| Independent | Robert Hicks | 332 | 69.3 | |
| Community Alliance Independent | Roger Vanstone | 147 | 30.7 | |
| Majority | | 185 | 38.6 | |
| Turnout | | 479 | 39.1 | |

Westward Ho!
| Party | Candidate | Votes | % | ±% |
|---|---|---|---|---|
| Community Alliance Independent | Timothy Williams | 428 | 57.6 | |
| Independent | Thomas Barclay | 315 | 42.4 | |
| Majority | | 113 | 15.2 | |
| Turnout | | 743 | 45.6 | |

Winkleigh
| Party | Candidate | Votes | % | ±% |
|---|---|---|---|---|
| Independent | John Cowle | 506 | 71.0 | |
| Community Alliance Independent | Paul Camilleri | 207 | 29.0 | |
| Majority | | 299 | 41.9 | |
| Turnout | | 713 | 47.9 | |

== By-elections between 2003 and 2007 ==
=== Bideford South ===
A by-election was held in Bideford South on 4 December 2003 after the former leader of the council, Liberal Democrat Mervyn Lane, resigned from the council due to ill health.

Bideford South by-election 4 December 2003
| Party | Candidate | Votes | % | ±% |
|---|---|---|---|---|
| Liberal Democrats | Anthony Inch | 244 | 44.4 | +4.1 |
| Independent | Chris Leather | 177 | 32.2 | +32.2 |
| Community Alliance | Shirley Hagley | 128 | 23.3 | −11.3 |
| Majority | | 67 | 12.2 | |
| Turnout | | 549 | 15.2 | −13.4 |
| Liberal Democrats hold | | Swing | | |

=== Westward Ho! ===
Westward Ho! by-election 4 November 2004
| Party | Candidate | Votes | % | ±% |
|---|---|---|---|---|
| Independent | Roger Tisdale | 257 | 37.1 | −5.3 |
| Liberal Democrats | John Hadfield | 226 | 32.6 | +32.6 |
| Conservative | Anthony Collins | 149 | 21.5 | +21.5 |
| Independent | Hugh Brading | 61 | 8.8 | +8.8 |
| Majority | | 31 | 4.5 | |
| Turnout | | 693 | 41.2 | −4.4 |
| Independent gain from Independent | | Swing | | |

=== Tamarside ===
Independent Kenneth James won a by-election in Tamarside on 14 July 2005 after the death of councillor Richard Broad.

Tamarside by-election 14 July 2005
| Party | Candidate | Votes | % | ±% |
|---|---|---|---|---|
| Independent | Kenneth James | 167 | 45.2 | |
| Conservative | Coral Broyd | 143 | 38.7 | |
| Independent | Arthur Stewart | 59 | 16.0 | |
| Majority | | 24 | 6.5 | |
| Turnout | | 369 | 29.6 | |
| Independent hold | | Swing | | |

=== Northam ===
Conservative Sam Robinson won a by-election in Northam on 23 November 2006 after the resignation of councillor Alan Eastwood.

Northam by-election 23 November 2006
| Party | Candidate | Votes | % | ±% |
|---|---|---|---|---|
| Conservative | Samuel Robinson | 556 | 57.3 | +57.3 |
| Green | Miranda Cox | 414 | 42.7 | +42.7 |
| Majority | | 142 | 14.6 | |
| Turnout | | 970 | 21.6 | −18.4 |
| Conservative gain from Independent | | Swing | | |
