= 2023 Torridge District Council election =

2023 English local election

- 4 May 2023

All 36 seats to Torridge District Council 19 seats needed for a majority

	First party	Second party	Third party
Leader		Cheryl Cottle-Hunkin	Simon Newton
Party	Independent	Liberal Democrats	Conservative
Last election	18 seats, 35.2%	2 seats, 10.9%	11 seats, 29.2%
Seats before	19 (Note: Of the 19 independent councillors prior to the election, 17 formed the "Independent" group led by Ken James, the other two were non-aligned.)	2	10 (Note: Including one vacant seat in Holsworthy ward previously held by Conservative councillor Jon Hutchings prior to his resignation in November 2022.)
Seats won	16	8	6
Seat change	▼2	▲6	▼5
Popular vote	11,236	7,885	8,429
Percentage	33.4%	23.4%	25.0%
Swing	▼1.8%	▲12.5%	▼4.5%
	Fourth party	Fifth party
Leader	Peter Christie	David Brenton
Party	Green	Labour
Last election	2 seats, 8.9%	3 seats, 12.0%
Seats before	2	3
Seats won	4	2
Seat change	▲4	▼1
Popular vote	3,515	2,273
Percentage	10.5%	6.7%
Swing	▲1.6%	▼5.6%
- Map of the results
Leader before election
Ken James
Independent
Leader after election
Ken James
Independent
No overall control

The 2023 Torridge District Council election took place on 4 May 2023, to elect all 36 members of Torridge District Council in Devon, England.

Prior to the election the majority of the councillors were independents, with 17 of the 19 independents forming the "Independent Group" led by Ken James, who served as leader of the council. After the election the council went under no overall control. The Independent Group remained the largest grouping, and Ken James was reappointed leader of the council at the subsequent annual council meeting on 22 May 2023.

== Summary ==
=== Election result ===
2023 Torridge District Council election
Party	Candidates	Seats	Gains	Losses	Net gain/loss	Seats %	Votes %	Votes	+/−
Independent	28	16	3	5	▼2	44.4	33.4	11,236	–1.8
Liberal Democrats	15	8	6	0	▲6	22.2	23.4	7,885	+12.5
Conservative	25	6	2	7	▼5	16.7	25.0	8,429	–4.5
Green	8	4	2	0	▲2	11.1	10.5	3,515	+1.6
Labour	9	2	1	2	▼1	5.6	6.7	2,273	–5.6
UKIP	2	0	0	0	Steady	0.0	0.7	231	–2.9
Britain First	2	0	0	0	Steady	0.0	0.6	204	N/A

Of the 16 independent councillors after the election, 14 formed the Independent Group led by Ken James, the other two sat with the Greens as the "Green Independents" led by Green councillor Peter Christie.

== Ward results ==
Incumbents are denoted by an asterisk (*)

=== Appledore ===
Appledore
Party	Candidate	Votes	%	±%
Independent	Leonard Ford*	599	64.5	+30.4
Green	Peter Hames*	588	63.4	+30.9
UKIP	Nigel Johnson	134	14.4	−9.3
Majority				
Turnout		935	31.97	−9.40
Rejected ballots		7	0.7	
Registered electors		2,925		
Independent hold		Swing		
Green hold		Swing		

=== Bideford East ===
Bideford East
Party	Candidate	Votes	%	±%
Independent	Judith Gubb*	459	43.3	+7.1
Independent	James Craigie	392	36.9	N/A
Green	Huw Thomas	387	36.5	+20.2
Labour	Jennifer Radford	316	29.8	+0.5
Independent	Jamie McKenzie*	309	29.1	+5.5
Conservative	Linda Hellyer	299	28.2	+6.1
Conservative	James Hellyer	257	24.2	+1.5
Conservative	Oliver Sherborne	198	18.7	+2.1
Majority				
Turnout		1,067	26.20	−1.03
Rejected ballots		6	0.6	
Registered electors		4,072		
Independent hold		Swing		
Independent gain from Independent		Swing		
Green gain from Labour		Swing		

=== Bideford North ===
Bideford North
Party	Candidate	Votes	%	±%
Green	Peter Christie*	871	65.4	+14.9
Liberal Democrats	Trevor Johns	517	38.8	+21.1
Independent	Douglas Bushby*	505	37.9	+0.3
Labour	Nicholas Radford	432	32.5	+5.9
Conservative	Dermot McGeough*	431	32.4	−13.6
UKIP	Gaston Dezart	97	7.3	N/A
Majority				
Turnout		1,334	30.27	−7.38
Rejected ballots		3	0.2	
Registered electors		4,407		
Green hold		Swing		
Liberal Democrats gain from Conservative		Swing		
Independent hold		Swing		

=== Bideford South ===
Bideford South
Party	Candidate	Votes	%	±%
Labour	David Brenton*	247	39.2	+7.1
Independent	Simon Inch	200	31.7	+0.8
Labour	Jake McLean	199	31.6	−0.5
Green	Simon Mathers	166	26.3	N/A
Independent	Peter Lawrence	162	25.7	−1.8
Britain First	Philip Green	108	17.1	N/A
Britain First	Anne Townsend	96	15.2	N/A
Majority				
Turnout		633	25.10	−1.87
Rejected ballots		3	0.5	
Registered electors		2,522		
Labour hold		Swing		
Independent gain from Labour		Swing		

=== Bideford West ===
Bideford West
Party	Candidate	Votes	%	±%
Independent	Carl Hawkins*	187	34.1	−2.0
Labour	Eithne Brenton	186	33.9	+6.0
Independent	Shirley Langford	178	32.4	N/A
Independent	Anthony Inch*	161	29.3	−3.8
Conservative	Jason Murdoch	128	23.3	−7.8
Conservative	Morgan Taylor	108	19.7	N/A
Majority				
Turnout		552	25.22	−2.87
Rejected ballots		3	0.5	
Registered electors		2,189		
Independent hold		Swing		
Labour gain from Conservative		Swing		

=== Broadheath ===
Broadheath
Party	Candidate	Votes	%	±%
Independent	Philip Hackett*	547	50.3	−9.6
Conservative	Stephen Gibson	449	41.3	+9.8
Liberal Democrats	Sherrie Green	412	37.9	N/A
Conservative	Graeme Barriball	380	34.9	+5.2
Majority				
Turnout		1,095	33.10	−1.67
Rejected ballots		7	0.6	
Registered electors		3,308		
Independent hold		Swing		
Conservative gain from Independent		Swing		

=== Great Torrington ===
Great Torrington
Party	Candidate	Votes	%	±%
Liberal Democrats	Christopher Bright*	751	59.9	+20.5
Liberal Democrats	Lauren Bright	588	46.9	−18.0
Liberal Democrats	Douglas Smith	553	44.1	N/A
Independent	Margaret Brown*	327	26.1	−11.5
Conservative	Roger Darch	318	25.4	N/A
Green	Keith Funnell	261	20.8	−2.9
Labour	Penelope Hewitt	230	18.4	−5.0
Conservative	Helen Wilton-Love	214	17.1	N/A
Majority				
Turnout		1,255	28.85	−3.42
Rejected ballots		2	0.2	
Registered electors		4,350		
Liberal Democrats hold		Swing		
Liberal Democrats hold		Swing		
Liberal Democrats gain from Independent		Swing		

=== Hartland ===
Hartland
Party	Candidate	Votes	%	±%
Liberal Democrats	Shirleyann Andrews	763	49.5	+23.2
Independent	Anna Dart*	755	49.0	+13.3
Conservative	Stephen Harding*	640	41.5	+4.3
Conservative	Richard Boughton*	567	36.8	−0.1
Independent	Robin Julian	439	28.5	+1.8
Majority				
Turnout		1,557	32.73	−5.41
Rejected ballots		15	1.0	
Registered electors		4,757		
Liberal Democrats gain from Conservative		Swing		
Independent hold		Swing		
Conservative hold		Swing		

=== Holsworthy ===
Holsworthy
Party	Candidate	Votes	%	±%
Liberal Democrats	Lyndon Piper	541	61.5	N/A
Independent	Peter Shepherd	460	52.3	N/A
Liberal Democrats	Emma Hosie	255	29.0	N/A
Conservative	Diana Stevens	166	18.9	−55.1
Conservative	Melanie Dymond	142	16.2	−32.3
Majority				
Turnout		881	36.14	+2.23
Rejected ballots		2	0.2	
Registered electors		2,438		
Liberal Democrats gain from Conservative		Swing		
Independent gain from Conservative		Swing		

=== Milton & Tamarside ===
Milton & Tamarside
Party	Candidate	Votes	%	±%
Independent	Kenneth James*	659	61.0	+61.0
Independent	Christopher Hepple*	524	48.5	+48.5
Green	Tracey Beresford	374	34.6	N/A
Labour	Tony Barrett	225	20.8	N/A
Majority				
Turnout		1,094	32.36	+32.36
Rejected ballots		14	1.3	
Registered electors		3,381		
Independent hold		Swing		
Independent gain from Conservative		Swing		

=== Monkleigh & Putford ===
Monkleigh & Putford
Party	Candidate	Votes	%	±%
Independent	Philip Pennington*	567	44.1	−16.2
Independent	Robert Hicks*	537	41.7	−12.2
Green	Rosemary Gent	355	27.6	+1.5
Conservative	Susan Collins	339	26.3	+6.9
Labour	James Lowe	312	24.2	N/A
Conservative	Jeffrey Wilton-Love	218	16.9	+2.0
Majority				
Turnout		1,303	40.91	+1.98
Rejected ballots		16	1.2	
Registered electors		3,185		
Independent hold		Swing		
Independent hold		Swing		

=== Northam ===
Northam
Party	Candidate	Votes	%	±%
Independent	Christopher Leather*	674	45.0	−2.9
Conservative	Jane Whittaker	530	35.4	+12.1
Green	Wendy Lo-Vel	513	34.2	N/A
Independent	Joanne Manley*	485	32.4	−4.4
Liberal Democrats	Samantha Newman-McKie	471	31.4	+15.8
Conservative	Carrie Woodhouse*	334	22.3	−0.5
Independent	John Himan	310	20.7	−2.6
Independent	Hugh Brading	268	17.9	N/A
Majority				
Turnout		1,526	37.18	+1.98
Rejected ballots		27	1.8	
Registered electors		4,104		
Independent hold		Swing		
Conservative gain from Independent		Swing		
Green gain from Independent		Swing		

=== Shebbear & Langtree ===
Shebbear & Langtree
Party	Candidate	Votes	%	±%
Liberal Democrats	Cheryl Cottle-Hunkin**	892	66.2	+30.2
Liberal Democrats	Christopher Wheatley	700	52.0	N/A
Conservative	David Hurley*	540	40.1	−5.8
Conservative	David Jupp	348	25.8	−6.4
Majority				
Turnout		1,359	43.92	+0.10
Rejected ballots		12	0.9	
Registered electors		3,094		
Liberal Democrats gain from Conservative		Swing		
Liberal Democrats gain from Independent		Swing		

Cheryl Cottle-Hunkin was a sitting councillor for Great Torrington ward.

=== Two Rivers & Three Moors ===
Two Rivers & Three Moors
Party	Candidate	Votes	%	±%
Conservative	Rosemary Lock*	609	50.2	−8.8
Conservative	Thomas Elliott	513	42.3	−9.3
Liberal Democrats	Roger Allen	476	39.2	N/A
Liberal Democrats	Claire Davey-Potts	452	37.3	N/A
Independent	Rachel Clarke	220	18.1	N/A
Majority				
Turnout		1,220	36.96	−1.89
Rejected ballots		7	0.6	
Registered electors		3,301		
Conservative hold		Swing		
Conservative hold		Swing		

=== Westward Ho! ===
Westward Ho!
Party	Candidate	Votes	%	±%
Independent	Claire Hodson*	494	46.0	−0.3
Independent	Louis Bach	334	31.1	N/A
Liberal Democrats	Albert Bruins	277	25.8	N/A
Independent	Derek Sargent	243	22.6	−3.8
Independent	Anmol Singh	241	22.4	N/A
Conservative	Kenneth Hind	183	17.0	−1.7
Conservative	Patricia Ferguson	175	16.3	N/A
Majority				
Turnout		1,081	35.99	−5.88
Rejected ballots		7	0.6	
Registered electors		3,004		
Independent hold		Swing		
Independent gain from Independent		Swing		

=== Winkleigh ===
Winkleigh
Party	Candidate	Votes	%	±%
Conservative	Simon Newton*	343	48.6	+0.7
Liberal Democrats	Stephen Middleton	237	33.6	−3.8
Labour	Angela Findlay	126	17.8	+3.1
Majority				
Turnout		710	40.55	+0.03
Rejected ballots		4	0.6	
Registered electors		1,751		
Conservative hold		Swing		

== Changes 2023–2027 ==
- James Craigie, elected as an independent, left the Independent Group in May 2025 to join the Green Party.

=== Bideford North by-election ===
Bideford North by-election, 2 May 2024
Party	Candidate	Votes	%	±%
Liberal Democrats	Teresa Tinsley	358	29.1	−9.7
Labour	Tom Hammett	231	18.8	−4.9
Green	John Puddy	229	18.6	−46.8
Conservative	Morgan Taylor	173	14.1	−8.4
Independent	Anthony Inch	123	10.0	N/A
Reform	Nigel Johnson	90	7.3	N/A
Independent	Ruth Craigie	25	2.0	N/A
Majority		127	10.3	N/A
Turnout		1,234	27.9	−2.4
Rejected ballots		5	0.4	
Registered electors		4,426		
Liberal Democrats gain from Green				

By-election triggered by death of Green councillor Peter Christie.

=== Appledore by-election ===
A by-election was held on 17 April 2025 after the disqualification of independent councillor Leonard Ford.

Appledore by-election: 17 April 2025
Party	Candidate	Votes	%	±%
Liberal Democrats	Kerry Samantha O'Rourke	304	40.8	N/A
Conservative	Carrie Woodhouse	235	31.5	N/A
Independent	Nigel Andrew Johnson	116	15.5	+1.1
Green	Keith Funnell	91	12.2	−51.2
Majority		69	9.3	
Turnout		763	25.5	
Rejected ballots		17	2.2	
Registered electors		2,995		
Liberal Democrats gain from Independent		Swing		

=== Milton & Tamarside by-election ===
A by-election was held on 23 October 2025 after independent councillor Kit Hepple resigned on moving to New Zealand.

Milton & Tamarside by-election: 23 October 2025
Party	Candidate	Votes	%	±%
Liberal Democrats	Nigel Kenneally	428	37.5	N/A
Reform	John Watson	355	31.1	N/A
Conservative	Evan Williams	191	16.7	N/A
Independent	Mark Marriott	101	8.8	N/A
Green	Tracey Beresford	67	5.9	−28.7
Majority		73	6.4	
Turnout		1,142	33.1	
Rejected ballots		0	0.0	
Registered electors		3,462		
Liberal Democrats gain from Independent		Swing		

=== Winkleigh by-election ===
A by-election was held on 4 December 2025 after Conservative councillor Simon Newton resigned on moving out of the area.

Winkleigh by-election: 4 December 2025
Party	Candidate	Votes	%	±%
Liberal Democrats	Stephen Middleton	325	42.3	+8.7
Reform	Michael Jarvis	252	32.8	N/A
Conservative	Benjamin Roth	191	24.9	–23.7
Majority		73	9.5	N/A
Turnout		771	41.81	+1.26
Rejected ballots		3	0.4	
Registered electors		1,844		
Liberal Democrats gain from Conservative		Swing		
