= 1999 Torridge District Council election =

1999 UK local government election

The 1999 Torridge District Council election took place on 6 May 1999 to elect members of Torridge District Council in Devon, England. The whole council was up for election and independents gained overall control of the council from no overall control.

== Election result ==
Overall turnout at the election was 36.1%.

Torridge local election result 1999
Party	Seats	Gains	Losses	Net gain/loss	Seats %	Votes %	Votes	+/−
Independent	20			+4	55.6	35.0	5,862	
Liberal Democrats	12			-1	33.3	37.1	6,208	
Labour	2			-3	5.6	20.2	3,379	
Green	1			+1	2.8	6.5	1,092	
Conservative	1			-1	2.8	1.1	184	

== Ward results ==
Appledore East
Party	Candidate	Votes	%	±%
Independent	Philip Waters	169	50.8	
Independent	Leonard Ford	108	32.4	
Labour	Irene Row	56	16.8	
Majority		61	18.3	
Turnout		333	39.8	

Appledore West
Party	Candidate	Votes	%	±%
Independent	Horace Ford	186	55.4	
Independent	John Sherritt	87	25.9	
Liberal Democrats	Colin Langbridge	63	18.8	
Majority		99	29.5	
Turnout		336	39.6	

Bideford East (3 seats)
Party	Candidate	Votes	%	±%
Liberal Democrats	Brian Shury	601		
Independent	Pamela Paddon	519		
Liberal Democrats	Noel Deakes	378		
Liberal Democrats	Andrew Smith	330		
Labour	Anne Brenton	241		
Labour	Lynda Dark	200		
Labour	Sarah Lovera	124		
Turnout		2,393	35.8	

Bideford North (3 seats)
Party	Candidate	Votes	%	±%
Green	Peter Christie	627		
Independent	Christopher Leather	565		
Liberal Democrats	Hugo Barton	506		
Liberal Democrats	Joyce Elliott	469		
Independent	Geoffrey Boundy	314		
Labour	Hugh Parry	190		
Independent	Peter Gompertz	188		
Labour	Walter Hill-Paul	148		
Labour	Richard Holdcraft	142		
Turnout		3,149	32.9	

Bideford South (3 seats)
Party	Candidate	Votes	%	±%
Liberal Democrats	Mervyn Lane	710		
Labour	David Brenton	532		
Liberal Democrats	David Daniel	488		
Labour	Ian Knight	443		
Liberal Democrats	John Hadfield	433		
Labour	Ian Hopkins	282		
Turnout		2,888	29.4	

Broadheath
Party	Candidate	Votes	%	±%
Independent	Frank Howard	unopposed		

Clovelly Bay
Party	Candidate	Votes	%	±%
Independent	Royston Johns	unopposed		

Coham Bridge
Party	Candidate	Votes	%	±%
Liberal Democrats	Allin Bewes	unopposed		

Forest
Party	Candidate	Votes	%	±%
Conservative	Howard Spratt	184	43.1	
Liberal Democrats	Brian Jones	182	42.6	
Independent	Geoffrey Broyd	61	14.3	
Majority		2	0.5	
Turnout		427	32.5	

Great Wood
Party	Candidate	Votes	%	±%
Liberal Democrats	Maurice Ridd	unopposed		

Hartland Point
Party	Candidate	Votes	%	±%
Independent	William Pillman	423	55.7	
Labour	Vivian Gale	336	44.3	
Majority		87	11.5	
Turnout		759	55.0	

Heanton
Party	Candidate	Votes	%	±%
Liberal Democrats	Joan Hardwicke	unopposed		

Holsworthy (2 seats)
Party	Candidate	Votes	%	±%
Independent	Honora Broad	unopposed		
Liberal Democrats	Desmond Shadrick	unopposed		

Kenwith
Party	Candidate	Votes	%	±%
Independent	Anthony Collins	unopposed		

Melbury
Party	Candidate	Votes	%	±%
Independent	Robert Hicks	321	56.6	
Independent	Frank Elliott	246	43.4	
Majority		75	13.2	
Turnout		567	41.2	

Morice
Party	Candidate	Votes	%	±%
Independent	Trevor Sillifant	unopposed		

Northam Central
Party	Candidate	Votes	%	±%
Independent	Richard Bradford	375	62.0	
Liberal Democrats	Alan Eastwood	230	38.0	
Majority		145	24.0	
Turnout		605	42.6	

Northam North
Party	Candidate	Votes	%	±%
Labour	David Rowe	270	58.8	
Liberal Democrats	Richard Osborne	189	41.2	
Majority		81	17.6	
Turnout		459	31.8	

Northam West
Party	Candidate	Votes	%	±%
Independent	Anthony Barnes	306	77.5	
Labour	Peter Jordan	89	22.5	
Majority		217	54.9	
Turnout		395	24.3	

Orchard Hill
Party	Candidate	Votes	%	±%
Independent	Susan Mounce	287	65.7	
Liberal Democrats	Keith Brauer	150	34.3	
Majority		137	31.4	
Turnout		437	33.2	

Rolle
Party	Candidate	Votes	%	±%
Independent	William Tanton	360	65.5	
Liberal Democrats	Simon Pine	190	34.5	
Majority		170	30.9	
Turnout		550	44.5	

Stafford
Party	Candidate	Votes	%	±%
Liberal Democrats	Patricia Ferguson	unopposed		

Tamarside
Party	Candidate	Votes	%	±%
Independent	Richard Broad	238	51.5	
Liberal Democrats	Peter Goldspink	224	48.5	
Majority		14	3.0	
Turnout		462	43.0	

Torrington (3 seats)
Party	Candidate	Votes	%	±%
Independent	Margaret Brown	666		
Liberal Democrats	William Brook	524		
Liberal Democrats	John Rawlinson	370		
Labour	James Thacker	326		
Green	Jonathon Rose	275		
Independent	Kenneth Miles	248		
Independent	Adrian Freeland	195		
Green	Catharine Simmons	190		
Liberal Democrats	George Peel	171		
Turnout		2,965	37.9	

Waldon
Party	Candidate	Votes	%	±%
Independent	David Poole	unopposed		

Westward Ho!
Party	Candidate	Votes	%	±%
Independent	David Tyler	unopposed		

Winkleigh
Party	Candidate	Votes	%	±%
Independent	John Cowle	unopposed		

== By-elections between 1999 and 2003 ==
=== Westward Ho! ===
Westward Ho! by-election 24 August 2000
Party	Candidate	Votes	%	±%
Independent	Thomas Barclay	329	86.1	
Independent	Geoffrey Boundy	53	13.9	
Majority		276	72.2	
Turnout		382	26.1	
Independent hold		Swing		

=== Holsworthy ===
Holsworthy by-election 20 September 2001
Party	Candidate	Votes	%	±%
Independent	John Allen	462	73.3	
Conservative	Geoffrey Broyd	168	26.7	
Majority		294	46.6	
Turnout		630	27.4	
Independent hold		Swing		
