= Paschal Triduum =

Good Friday, Holy Saturday, and Easter Sunday

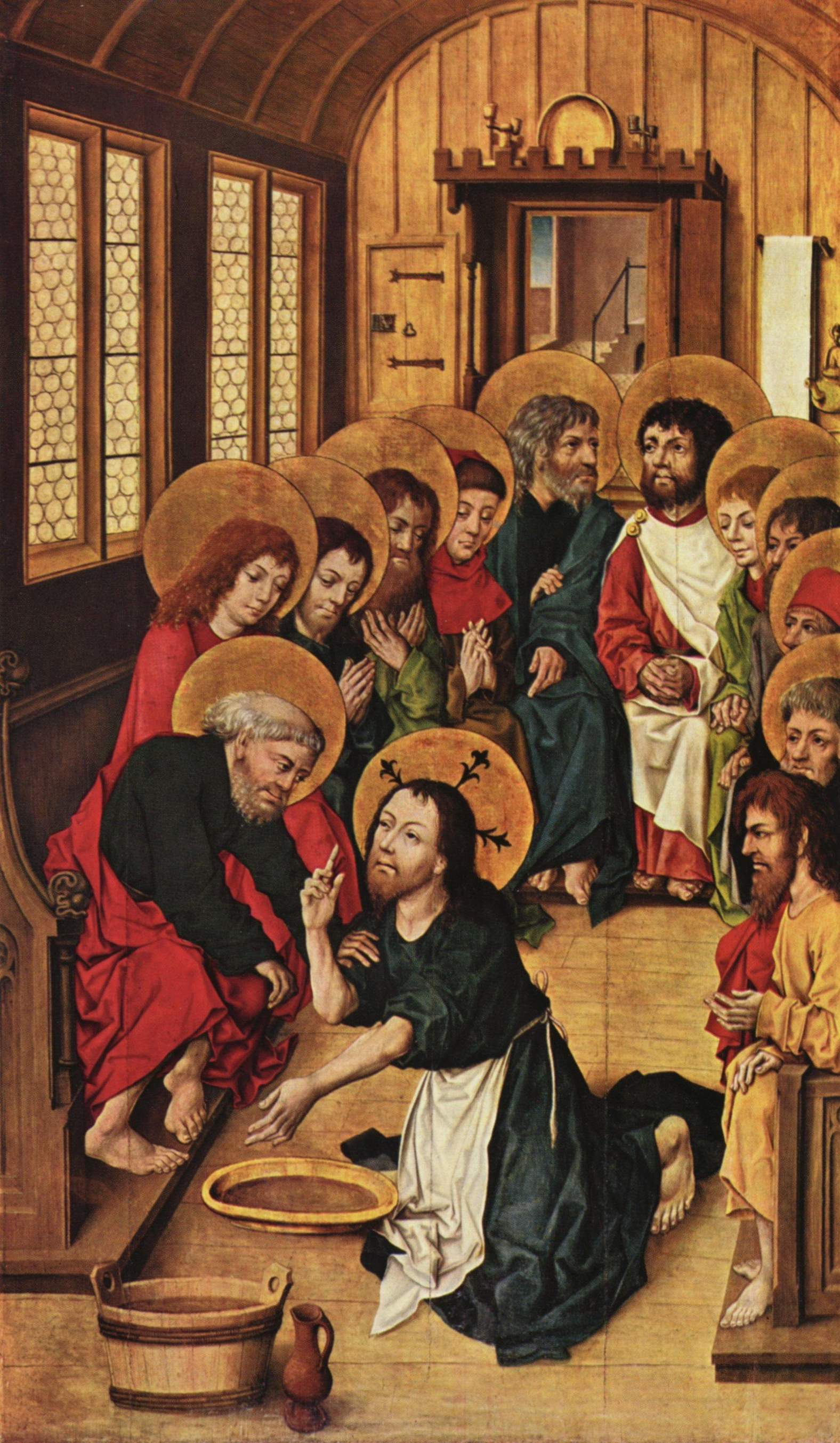
Christ Washing the Feet of the Apostles by Meister des Hausbuches, 1475 (Gemäldegalerie, Berlin)

Paschal Triduum and other named days and day ranges around Lent and Easter in Western Christianity, with the fasting days of Lent numbered

The Paschal Triduum or Easter Triduum (Latin: Triduum Paschale), Holy Triduum (Latin: Triduum Sacrum), or the Three Days, is the Christian period of three days that begins with the liturgy on the evening of Maundy Thursday, reaches its high point in the Easter Vigil, and closes with evening prayer on Easter Sunday. It is a moveable observance recalling the Passion, Crucifixion, Death, burial, and Resurrection of Jesus, as portrayed in the canonical Gospels.

In the Anglican, Lutheran, Methodist, Moravian and Reformed traditions, the Paschal Triduum straddles the two liturgical seasons of Lent and Easter in the Church calendar (Holy Saturday is the last day of Lent, with the Easter Vigil being the first liturgy of Eastertide). In the Roman Catholic tradition since the 1955 reform by Pope Pius XII, the Easter Triduum has been more clearly distinguished as a separate liturgical period.

Previously, all these celebrations were advanced by more than twelve hours. The Mass of the Lord's Supper and the Easter Vigil were celebrated on the morning of Thursday and Saturday respectively, and Holy Week and Lent were seen as ending only on the approach of Easter. In the Roman Rite, after the Gloria in excelsis Deo in the Mass of the Lord's Supper, all church bells are silenced (sometimes replaced by a crotalus) and the organ is not used. This period that lasted from Thursday morning to before Easter Sunday began what was once referred to in Anglo-Saxon times as "the still days". Weddings in the Catholic Church were once prohibited throughout Lent and certain other times of the year as well, and are still forbidden during the Triduum. Lutherans still discourage weddings during the entirety of Holy Week, inclusive of the Easter Triduum.

== Maundy Thursday (also called Holy Thursday) ==
Dates for the Paschal Triduum, 2022–2030
Year	Western	Eastern
2022	April 14 – April 16	April 21 – April 23
2023	April 6 – April 8	April 13 – April 15
2024	March 28 – March 30	May 2 – May 4
2025	April 17 – April 19	April 17 – April 19
2026	April 2 – April 4	April 9 – April 11
2027	March 25 – March 27	April 29 – May 1
2028	April 13 – April 15	April 13 – April 15
2029	March 29 – March 31	April 5 – April 7
2030	April 18 – April 20	April 25 – April 27

In liturgical denominations of Christianity, the Triduum begins with the evening of Maundy Thursday. In the Catholic Church, Evangelical-Lutheran Churches, and in the Anglo-Catholic tradition of Anglicanism, in the Mass of the Lord's Supper, during the Gloria in Excelsis Deo, all church bells may be rung and the organ played; afterwards, bells and organ are silenced until the Gloria of the Easter Vigil. After the homily or sermon of the Mass, "where a pastoral reason suggests it", a ritual washing of the feet follows. The Mass concludes with a procession of the Blessed Sacrament to the altar of repose. This is usually followed by the stripping of the altars. Eucharistic adoration is encouraged after this, but if continued after midnight should be done without outward solemnity.

In the form of the Roman Rite in use before 1955, Mass was celebrated in the morning. Some faithful travelled to several churches to pray at each one's Altar of Repose, a practice called Seven Churches Visitation, which may also be done on Good Friday. The Mass included no washing of the feet, which could instead be done in a separate ceremony later in the day. The Mass itself concluded with a ritual stripping of all altars except the altar of repose, leaving only the cross and candlesticks. In the present form as revised in 1955, the altar is stripped bare without ceremony at some time after the evening Mass.

The liturgical colour for the Mass vestments and other ornaments is white in the Catholic and Anglican Churches. In the Lutheran Church, the liturgical colour for Maundy Thursday is scarlet or white. In the Reformed tradition, white or gold may be used. In the United Methodist Church, black is used as the liturgical colour.

== Good Friday ==
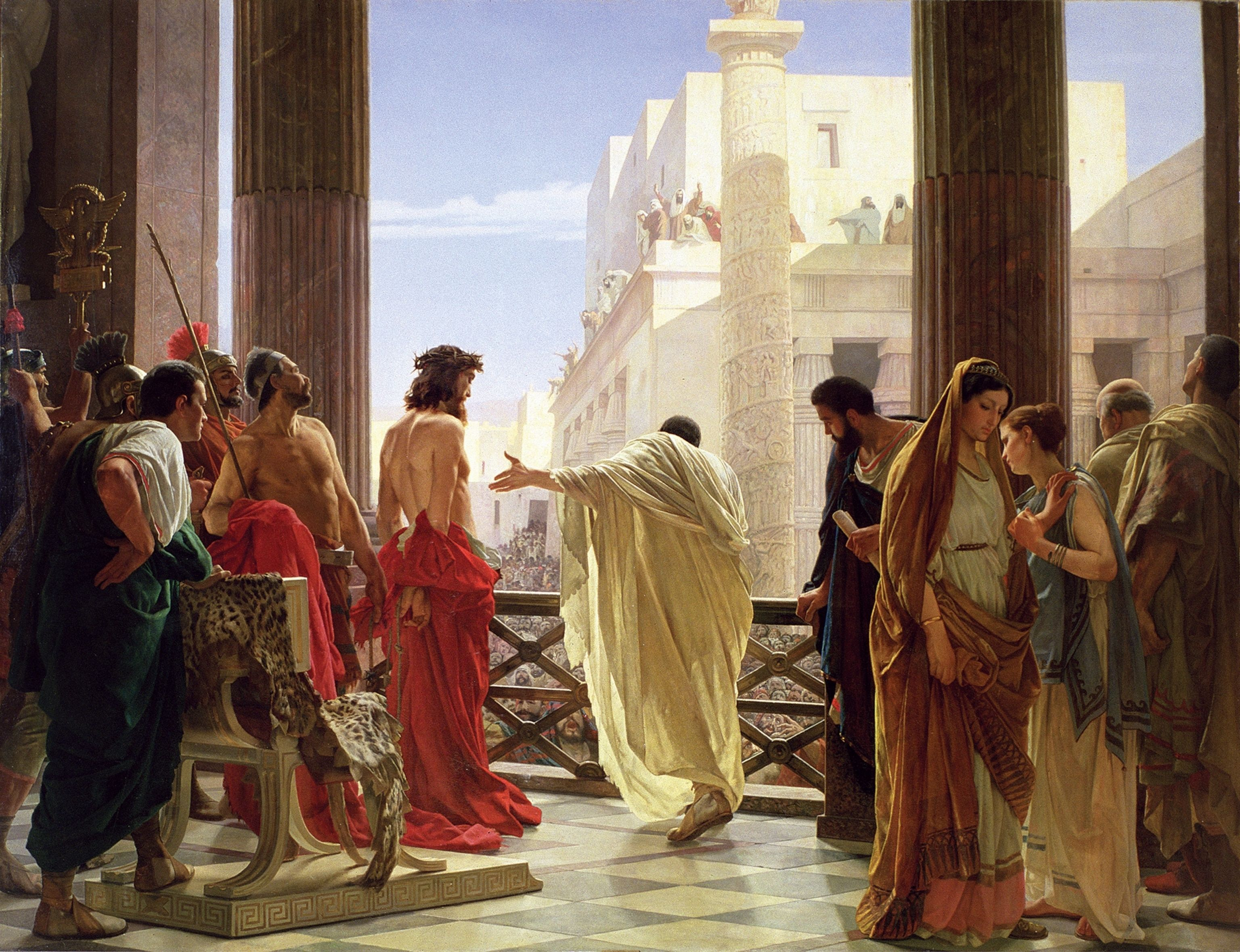
Ecce Homo by Antonio Ciseri (19th century).

On Good Friday, Christians recall the passion and crucifixion of Jesus.

In the Roman Catholic, Lutheran, and Anglo-Catholic rites, a cross or crucifix (not necessarily the one that stands on or near the altar on other days of the year) is ceremonially unveiled. (In pre-1955 services, other crucifixes were to be unveiled, without ceremony, after the Good Friday service.) In the Catholic rite, the celebrating priest and his assistants traditionally prostrate in front of the altar for the Celebration of the Passion of the Lord. All others kneel. The celebration usually starts at 3 p.m., the time at which it says in the scripture: "So when Jesus had received the sour wine, He said, 'It is finished!' And bowing his head, he gave up his spirit". Mass is not celebrated on Good Friday and the communion distributed at the Celebration of the Passion of the Lord is consecrated on Holy Thursday, hence the pre-1955 name "Mass of the Presanctified". In Anglican churches, there is no prayer of consecration on Good Friday, and the Reserved Sacrament is distributed at services on that day.

Also in Catholicism, statues, with the exception of those depicting the suffering Christ, such as the Man of Sorrows, are also covered with purple or black cloths. Votive lights before these images are not lit. Crucifixes are veiled until the Good Friday service. Catholic faithful typically venerate the crucifix by kissing the feet of the corpus. Veneration of a simple wooden cross is common in Anglican worship, with the faithful touching or kissing it.

The liturgical colour varies: red, or black are used in different traditions. The Catholic Church uses red vestments, symbolic of the blood of Jesus Christ, but in the pre-1970 form of the Roman Missal the priest wears black vestments, changing to violet for the communion part of the liturgy. In Anglican services, black vestments are sometimes used. In the United Methodist Church, black is the liturgical colour. In the Lutheran churches, black is also the liturgical color used this day, and clergy typically wear a black cassock.

Moravians hold a Lovefeast on Good Friday as they receive Holy Communion on Maundy Thursday. Communicants of the Moravian Church practice the Good Friday tradition of cleaning gravestones in Moravian cemeteries.

== Holy Saturday ==
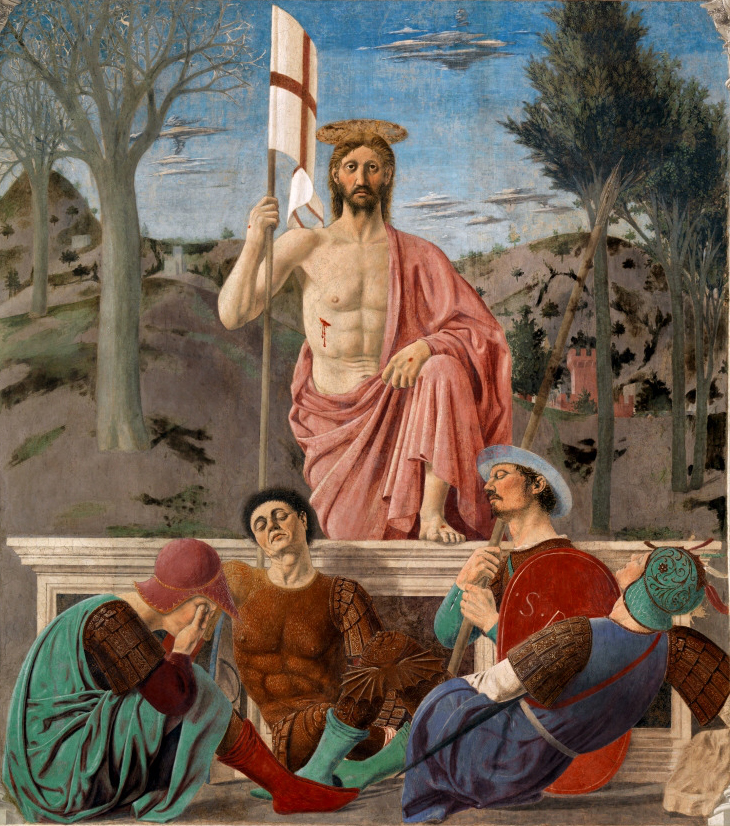
Jesus Resurrected by Piero della Francesca (15th century)

Also called Black Saturday, is a vigil service that is held after nightfall on Holy Saturday, or before dawn on Easter Sunday, in commemoration Jesus' death, sabbath rest, and harrowing of Hell. Many of the details that follow hold for Evangelical Lutheran and Anglican churches as well as Catholic worship. The ceremony of darkness and light is held at the beginning of the Easter Vigil Mass. The paschal candle, whose lighting symbolizes the resurrection of Christ from the dead, is lit from the new Easter fire. The solemn procession to the altar with the Paschal candle is formed. Once everyone has processed in, the Exsultet is intoned.

After the Exsultet, everyone is seated and listens to seven readings from the Old Testament and seven psalms and canticles. At least three of these readings and associated psalms and canticles must be read, which must include the account of the deliverance of the Israelites at the Red Sea from the Book of Exodus, a central event of the first Passover. Pastoral conditions are taken into account when deciding on the number of readings. These readings account salvation history, beginning with Creation. In Anglican worship, there are nine possible readings from the Old Testament, and a minimum of two must be read, which must include the account of Israel's deliverance at the Red Sea.

In Catholic practice, during the Gloria at the Mass, the organ and church bells are used in the liturgy for the first time in two days. If the lights of the Church have been previously left off, they are turned on as the Gloria begins. The Paschal candle is used to bless the baptismal font to be used in the celebration of the sacrament. The Great Alleluia is sung before the Gospel is read, Alleluia being used for the first time since before Lent. People receiving full initiation in the Church, who have completed their training, are given the Sacraments of Christian initiation (Baptism, Confirmation, and the Holy Eucharist). In Catholic, Evangelical-Lutheran, and Anglican tradition, the Easter Vigil is an especially appropriate day for Holy Baptism.

In current practice, the use of lighting to signify the emergence from sin and the resurrection of Jesus varies, from the use of candles held by parishioners as well as candelabra lit throughout the church. If statues and images have been veiled during the last two weeks of Lent, they are unveiled, without ceremony, before the Easter Vigil service begins. (In the 1962 Catholic missal and earlier missals, they are unveiled during the "Gloria in Excelsis" of the Easter Vigil Mass.)

Color of vestments and hangings: white, often together with gold, with yellow and white flowers often in use in many parishes.

Easter Masses are held throughout the day and are similar in content to the Easter Vigil Mass.

== Eastertide ==
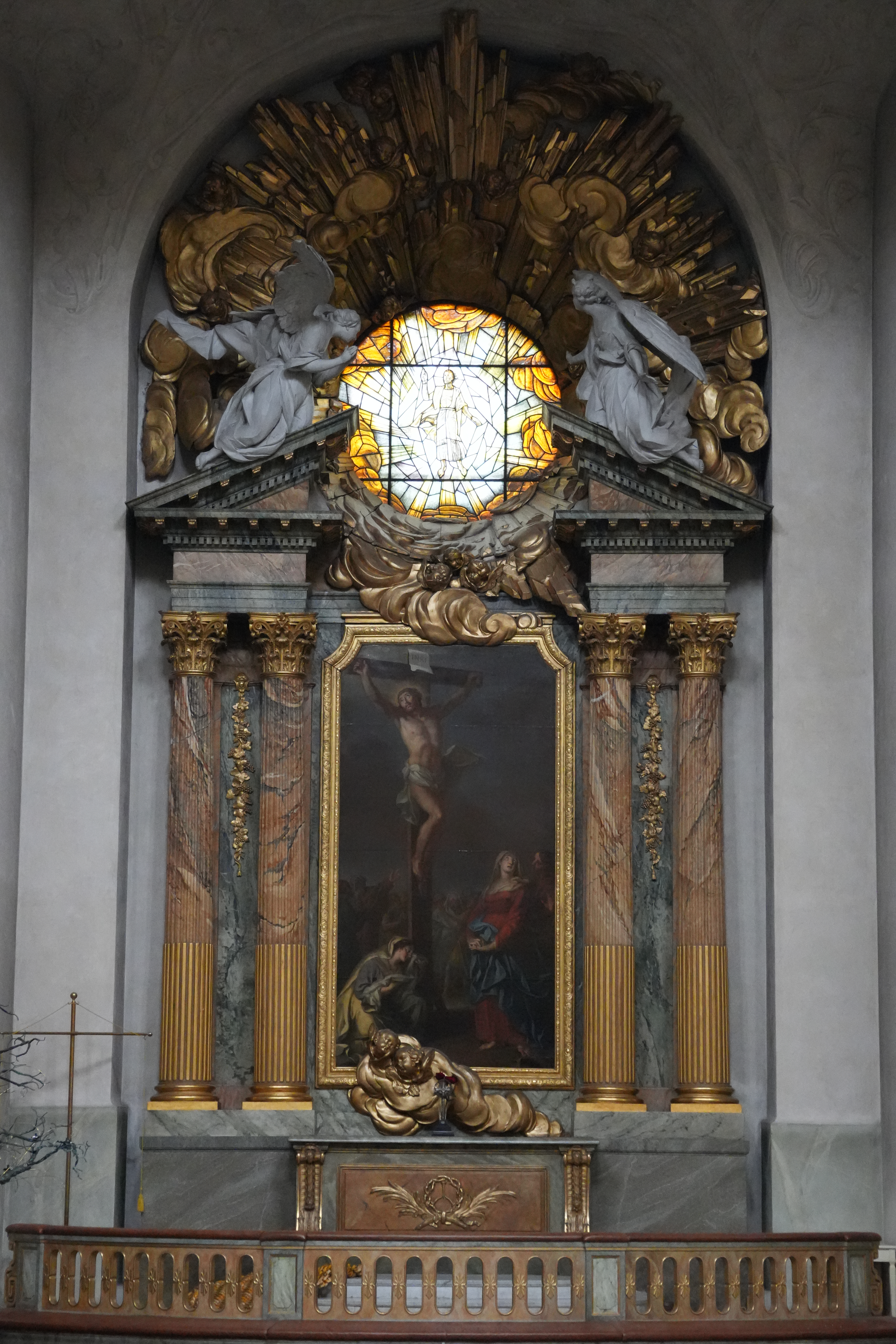
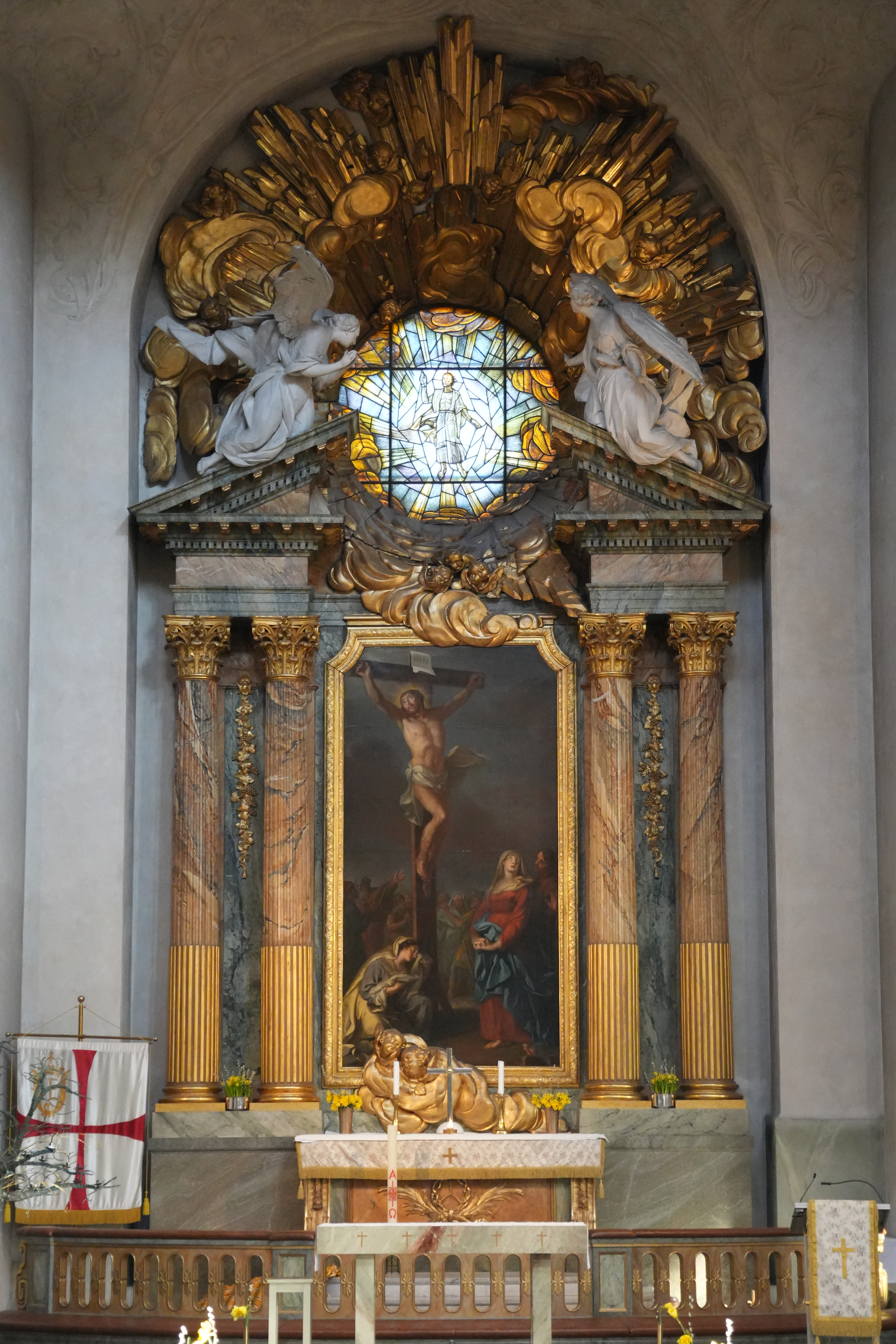
The altar of Hedvig Eleonora Evangelical-Lutheran Church in Östermalm, Sweden on Good Friday (left) and Easter Sunday (right). On Maundy Thursday, the altar was stripped, and the lamps were dimmed, in preparation for the somber nature of Good Friday mourning the crucifixion of Jesus; in contrast, on Easter Sunday, the altar is adorned with white and gold paraments (the liturgical colours for Eastertide in Evangelical-Lutheranism), with the lights brightly shining for the celebratory nature of the Feast of the Resurrection of Our Lord. (2026)

The date of Easter varies from year to year. It occurs on the first Sunday after the first full moon on or after 21 March, a date taken, in accordance with an ancient ecclesiastical tradition, to be that of the spring equinox, but which does not always correspond to the astronomical equinox. The Julian Calendar is taken as the basis of the calculations by nearly all Oriental Orthodox. Eastern Lutheran and Eastern Orthodox Churches and is accepted even by Latin Church Catholics in countries such as Ethiopia and Greece.

In the 20th and 21st centuries, the Julian Calendar's 21 March corresponds to 3 April in the Gregorian Calendar, the calendar used for civil purposes in most countries. The earliest possible date for Easter is 22 March, and the latest 25 April. These dates in the Julian Calendar now correspond to the Gregorian Calendar's 4 April and 8 May.

During the Easter octave (and also during Holy Week) no other feast is celebrated. If Easter is very early, the solemnity of the Annunciation (25 March) may fall within the octave or Holy Week and is then transferred to the Monday after the octave.

The Sundays of Advent, Lent, and Easter have precedence over all feasts and solemnities, solemnities being then transferred to the following Monday, unless they occur on Palm Sunday or on Sunday of the Lord's Resurrection. "The Solemnity of Saint Joseph, where it is observed as a Holy day of Obligation, should it fall on Palm Sunday of the Lord's Passion, is anticipated on the preceding Saturday, 18 March. Where, on the other hand, it is not observed as a Holy day of Obligation, it may be transferred by the Conference of Bishops to another day outside Lent."

The solemnity of the Ascension is on the fortieth day of Easter, which is always a Thursday, although it may be observed on the following Sunday. Pentecost (or Whitsun) is the fiftieth day.

The Easter season extends from the Easter Vigil through Pentecost Sunday on the Roman Catholic, Evangelical-Lutheran, Reformed and Anglican calendars. In the pre-1970 Roman Catholic calendar the octave of Pentecost is included in Eastertide, which thus ends at None of the following Ember Saturday.

During the 50-day Easter period, vestments are generally white or gold, but red when celebrating apostles and martyrs and on the solemnity of Pentecost. In the pre-1970 Roman Catholic calendar, with its 56-day Eastertide, red was used during the octave of Pentecost.

== See also ==
- Holy Week
- Holy Week procession
