= Mass of the Lord's Supper =

Beginning of the Paschal Triduum

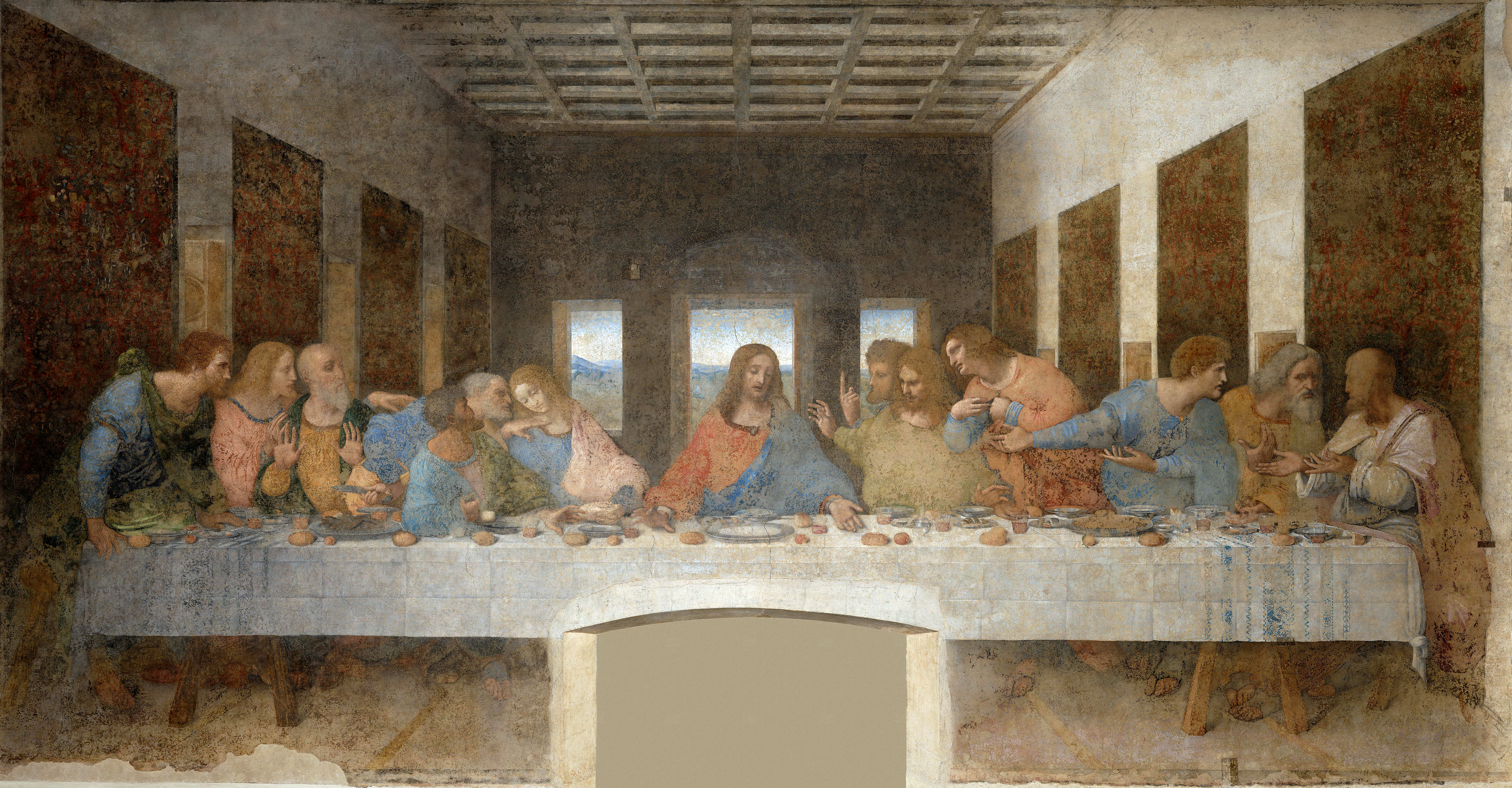
The Last Supper (Convent of Sta. Maria delle Grazie, Milan, Italy (1498), by Leonardo da Vinci).

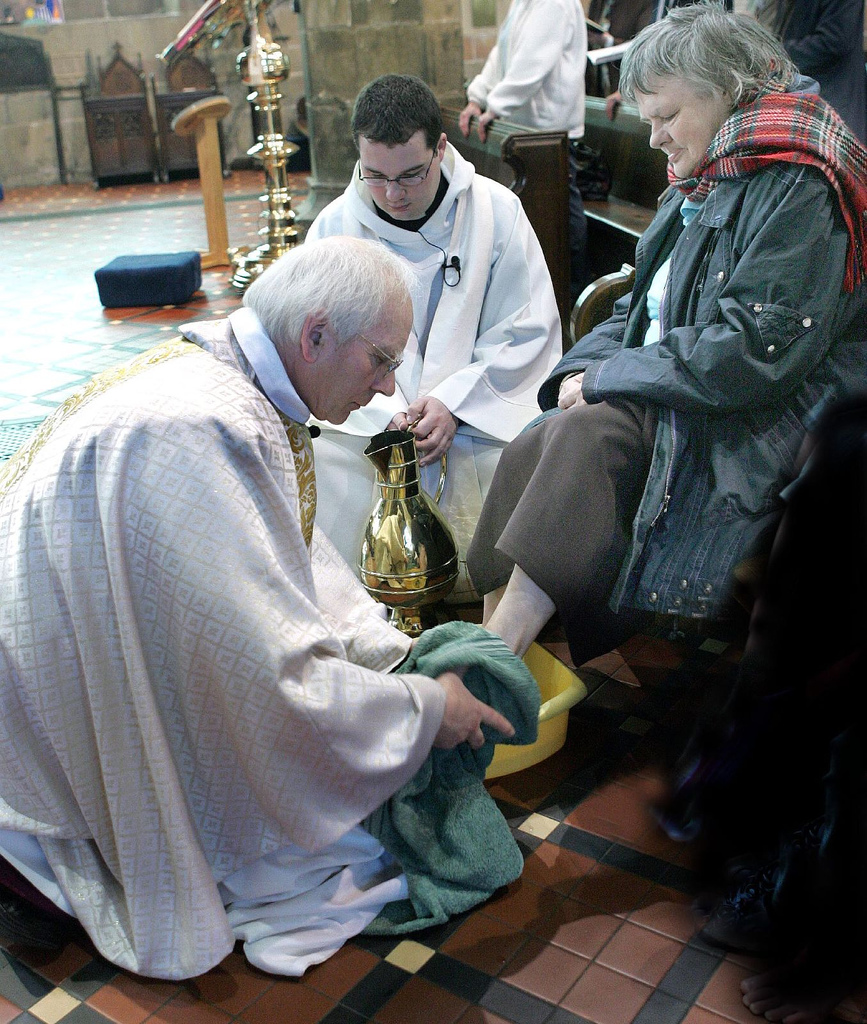
The Maundy, or foot washing. This image of the ceremony was taken in St Asaph Cathedral on Maundy Thursday, 2007

The Mass of the Lord's Supper, also known as A Service of Worship for Maundy Thursday, is a Holy Week service celebrated on the evening of Maundy Thursday. It inaugurates the Easter Triduum, and commemorates the Last Supper of Jesus with his disciples establishing the Eucharist, more explicitly than other celebrations of the Mass.

The Catholic, Lutheran, Anglican, and Methodist traditions, as well as some Reformed (including certain Continental Reformed, Presbyterian and Congregationalist churches) traditions celebrate the Mass of the Lord's Supper (or the Liturgy of Maundy Thursday). A comparable service is celebrated in the Orthodox Church.

The Mass stresses three aspects of that event: "the institution of the Eucharist, the institution of the ministerial priesthood, and the commandment of brotherly love that Jesus gave after washing the feet of his disciples."

In Lutheranism, the Maundy Thursday liturgy is found in the Lutheran Service Book and Evangelical Lutheran Worship, among other service books. In Anglicanism, these rites are found in the Book of Common Prayer, as well as in the Anglican Missal. In Methodism, they are found in the Book of Worship for Church and Home and The United Methodist Book of Worship, among other liturgical texts. The Orthodox equivalent is found in the Triodion, with the Washing of Feet in some editions of the Euchologion.

== History ==
The celebration of a Mass in the evening of Holy Thursday began in late fourth-century Jerusalem, where it became customary to celebrate the events of the Passion of Jesus in the places where they took place. In Rome at that time a Mass was celebrated at which penitents were reconciled with a view to participation in the Easter celebrations. The Jerusalem custom spread and in seventh-century Rome the Pope celebrated a Mass of the Lord's Supper on this day as well as the Mass of Reconciliation. By the eighth century, the Masses became three: one for reconciliation, one for blessing the holy oils and a third for the Last Supper. The last two were in reduced form, being without Liturgy of the Word. Pope Pius V's reforms in 1570 forbade the celebration of Mass after noon, and the Mass of the Lord's Supper became a morning Mass and remained so until Pope Pius XII's reforms in the 1950s.

The washing of feet that is now part of the Mass of the Lord's Supper was in use at an early stage without relation to this particular day, and was first prescribed for use on Holy Thursday by a 694 Council of Toledo. By the twelfth century it was found in the Roman liturgy as a separate service. Pope Pius V included this rite in his Roman Missal, placing it after the text of the Mass of the Lord's Supper. He did not make it part of the Mass, but indicated that it was to take place "at a suitable hour" after the stripping of the altars. The 1955 revision by Pope Pius XII inserted it into the Mass. Current rubrics indicate that the rite is not an obligatory part of that Mass, but rather is something to be carried out "where a pastoral reason suggests it" (Roman Missal, Mass of the Lord's Supper, no. 10).

== Structure ==
The Mass begins as usual, with the exception that the tabernacle, wherever placed, should be empty.

In the 1962 Missal (Roman Rite), although white vestments and the Gloria in excelsis Deo are used due to the celebration being the solemnity of an Institution of the Eucharist, this is still Passiontide, so the Judica me is omitted at the foot of the altar, the Gloria Patri in the Introit and at the end of the Lavabo is omitted, and the Preface of the Cross is used. (The crucifixes, which have been covered during Passiontide, can today be veiled in white instead violet.)

At the singing of the Gloria in excelsis Deo, all the church bells may be rung; afterwards, they (along with the organ) are silenced until the Gloria of the Easter Vigil.

The Liturgy of the Word consists of the following readings:

- Exodus 12:1-8, 11-14, a description of the original Passover celebration.
- Psalm 115 (116), thanksgiving for being saved
- 1 Corinthians 11:23-26, Paul the Apostle's account of what Jesus did at his Last Supper
- John 13:1-15, John the Evangelist's account of how Jesus washed his disciples' feet before that meal as an example of how they should treat each other.

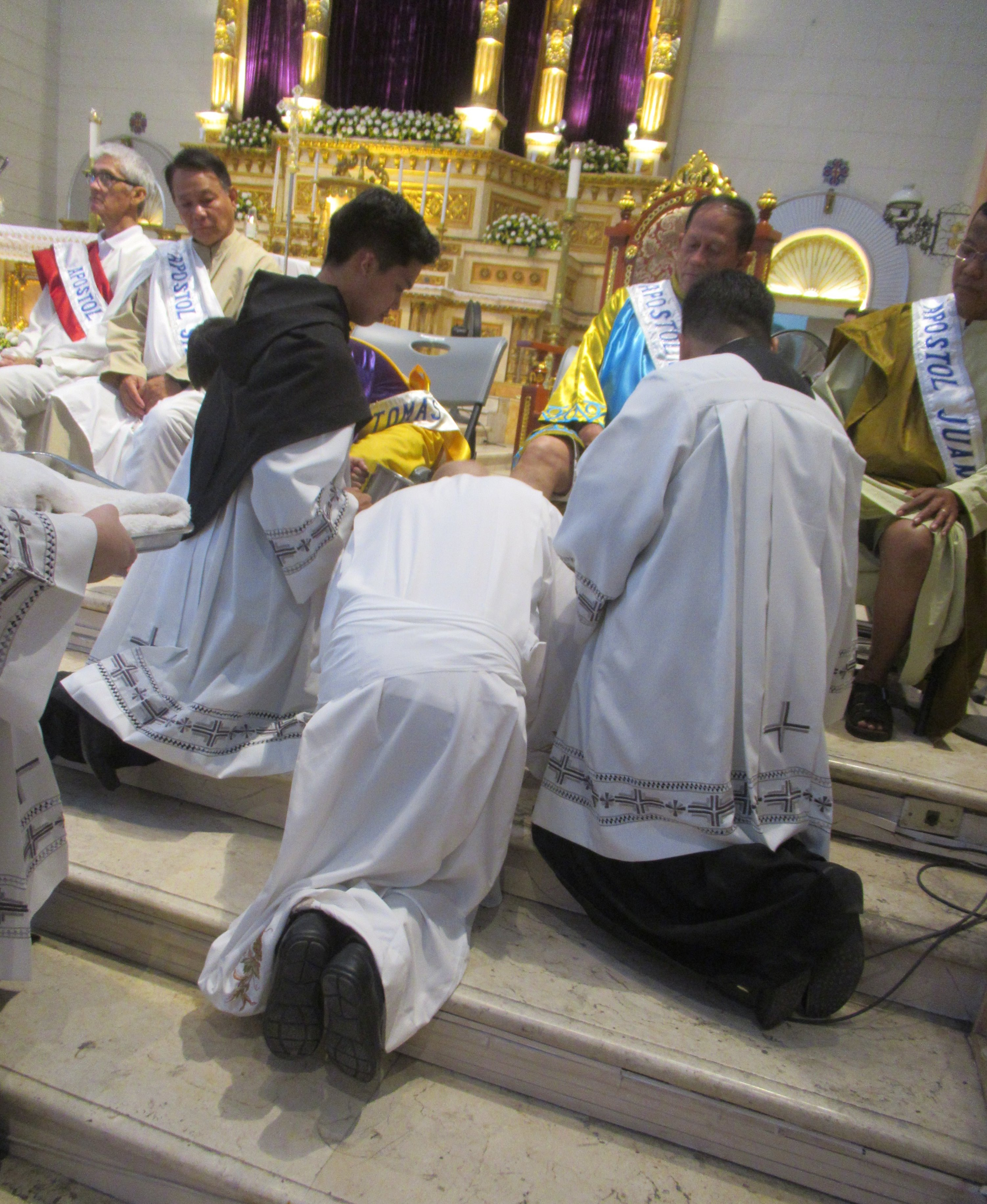
Kissing of Feet 2024 (Bulacan)

After the homily, which should explain the three aspects of the celebration mentioned above, the priest who is celebrating the Mass removes his chasuble, puts on a linen gremiale (an amice is often used for this purpose), and proceeds to wash the feet of a number of people (usually twelve, corresponding to the number of the Apostles)

The recitation of the Nicene Creed is omitted in Anglican, Methodist, Lutheran, and Roman Catholic liturgies for Maundy Thursday.

There are special formulas in the Eucharistic Prayer to recall that the Mass of the Lord's Supper is in commemoration of Jesus' Last Supper.

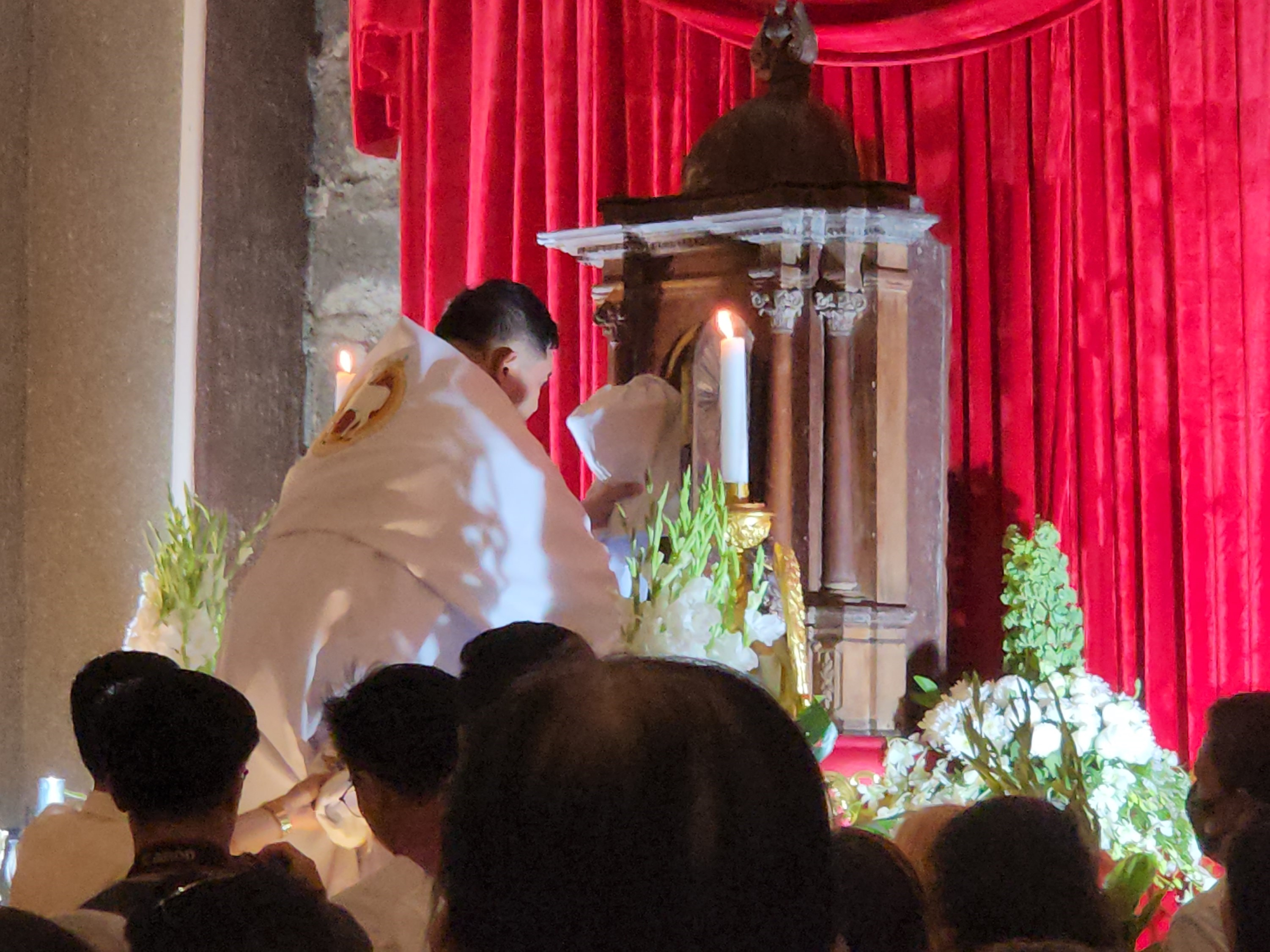
After the procession of the Blessed Sacrament, a priest places the ciborium (veiled in white) in the tabernacle at the altar of repose.

Sufficient hosts are consecrated for the faithful to receive Communion both at that Mass and on the celebration of the Passion of the Lord on Good Friday. The hosts intended for the liturgy of Good Friday are not placed in the tabernacle, as is usual, but are left on the altar, while the priest says the postcommunion prayer. Then the priest incenses the Blessed Sacrament three times and, taking a humeral veil with which to hold it, carries it in solemn procession to a place of reservation somewhere in the church or in an appropriately adorned chapel. The procession is led by a cross-bearer accompanied by two servers with lit candles; other servers with lit candles follow and a thurifer immediately precedes the priest.

On arrival at the altar of repose, the priest places the vessel with the Blessed Sacrament in the tabernacle there, leaving the door open. He then incenses it and closes the tabernacle door. After a period of adoration, he and the servers depart in silence. A plenary indulgence is granted to the faithful, who devoutly recite the Tantum Ergo on Holy Thursday if it is recited in a solemn manner.

The continuation of Eucharistic adoration is encouraged, but if continued after midnight should be done without outward solemnity. In the Philippines and several other Catholic countries, the faithful will travel from church to church praying at each church's altar of repose in a practice known as Seven Churches Visitation or Visita Iglesia. The Blessed Sacrament remains in the temporary place until the Holy Communion part of the Good Friday liturgical service.

=== Stripping of the Altar ===
On Maundy Thursday, the chancels of churches are traditionally stripped, with the altar often being draped with black paraments, in preparation for Good Friday.

In the Methodist churches, the chancel is stripped of any decorations, such as flowers and candles. Aside from depictions of the Stations of the Cross, other images, such as the cross, continue to be veiled in black or purple.

At the conclusion of the Maundy Thursday liturgy in Lutheran churches, "the altar, lectern and pulpit are left bare until Easter to symbolize the humiliation and barrenness of the cross."

In Anglican churches, this ceremony is also performed at the conclusion of Maundy Thursday services, "in which all appointments, linens, and paraments are removed from the altar and chancel in preparation for Good Friday."

In the Catholic Church, the form of the Roman Rite in use before 1955 had no washing of the feet, which could instead be done in a separate later ceremony, and the Mass concluded with a ritual stripping of all altars, except the altar of repose, but leaving the cross and candlesticks. This was done to the accompaniment of Psalm 21 (Vulgate) (Deus, Deus meus) preceded and followed by the antiphon "Diviserunt sibi vestimenta mea: et super vestem meam miserunt sortem" (They divided my clothes among them and cast lots for my garment). The reading from 1 Corinthians 11 covers more verses (20-32), including verses 27-32 which are completely absent from the new lectionary. In the Catholic Church, since 1955, the altar is stripped bare without ceremony later.

== Byzantine Rite ==
Churches following the Byzantine Rite (Byzantine Rite Catholics and Eastern Orthodox Christians) use a similar service, called The Mystical Supper, celebrated somewhat earlier in the day, often in the late morning. It is the only time between Palm Sunday and Holy Saturday that a full Divine Liturgy can be served.

The service begins as Vespers, with Psalm 103 (104) and the Great Litany. 'Lord, I call' is sung immediately without a reading from the Psalter, and the hymns come from Lauds at Matins served the night before, reflecting on Judas' betrayal and Christ as the Man of Sorrows. A new hymn is then added comparing Judas to the Israelites who schemed against God in the wilderness. Following the Little Entrance, the Evening Prokimenon comes from Psalm 139 (140): 'Deliver me, O Lord, from the evil man: from the unrighteous man preserve me.'

Three readings follow, with a Prokimenon before the second:

- Exodus 19:10-19 - Moses consecrates the people in advance of God arriving upon Mount Sinai.
- The Second Prokimenon is from Psalm 58 (59): 'Deliver me from mine enemies, O God: defend me from them that rise up against me.'
- Job 38:1-21; 42:1-5 - God reveals himself to Job
- Isaiah 50:4-11 - The third Suffering Servant Song

The Trisagion is sung as usual, followed by a Prokimenon from Psalm 2: 'The rulers took counsel together against the Lord and against his anointed.' The Epistle is 1 Corinthians 11:23-32, St. Paul's recount of the Last Supper. After three Alleluia verses from Psalm 40 ('Blessed is he who considers the poor and needy'), the Gospel follows. This is a Composite Gospel (Matthew 26:2-20; John 13:3-17; Matthew 26:21-39; Luke 22:43-45; Matthew 26:40-27:2), which tells St. Matthew's account of the Last Supper and the events surrounding it, interspersed with St. John's account of the Washing of the Feet and St. Luke's account of Jesus sweating blood.

The rest of the Liturgy is as standard for the Liturgy of St. Basil, with the exception that the Cherubic Hymn, Communion Verse, and hymns sung during and after Communion are replaced with this hymn:

Of Thy Mystical Supper, O Son of God, accept me this day as a partaker. For I will not speak of the mystery to Thine enemies, nor will I give Thee a kiss like Judas, but like the thief I will acknowledge Thee: Remember me, O Lord, in Thy Kingdom.

The Hymn to the Theotokos is replaced with the Irmos of Ode 9 from the Canon at Matins, inviting the faithful to take advantage of the Master's hospitality.

After the Prayer before the Ambon, it is customary to celebrate the Washing of the Feet, especially in certain cathedrals and monasteries. Psalm 50 (51) is read, and the congregation moves to the porch as the choir sings Ode 5 from the Canon at Matins the previous evening. This is followed by stichera and the Great Litany. Prayers follow, and those to have their feet washed sit down as the Priest begins the Gospel (John 13:3-11). He pauses at various moments to perform actions mentioned in the story. Finally, he pauses to wash the feet of those seated, beginning with the porter (or Chairman) and ending with the bursar (or Treasurer). He then finishes the reading, and follows it with another (John 13:12-17). A final prayer is said, the congregation wash their hands and face with water from the blessing as two final hymns are sung and all return to the church for the dismissal.
