= Parament =

Hanging or ornament used in a room of state

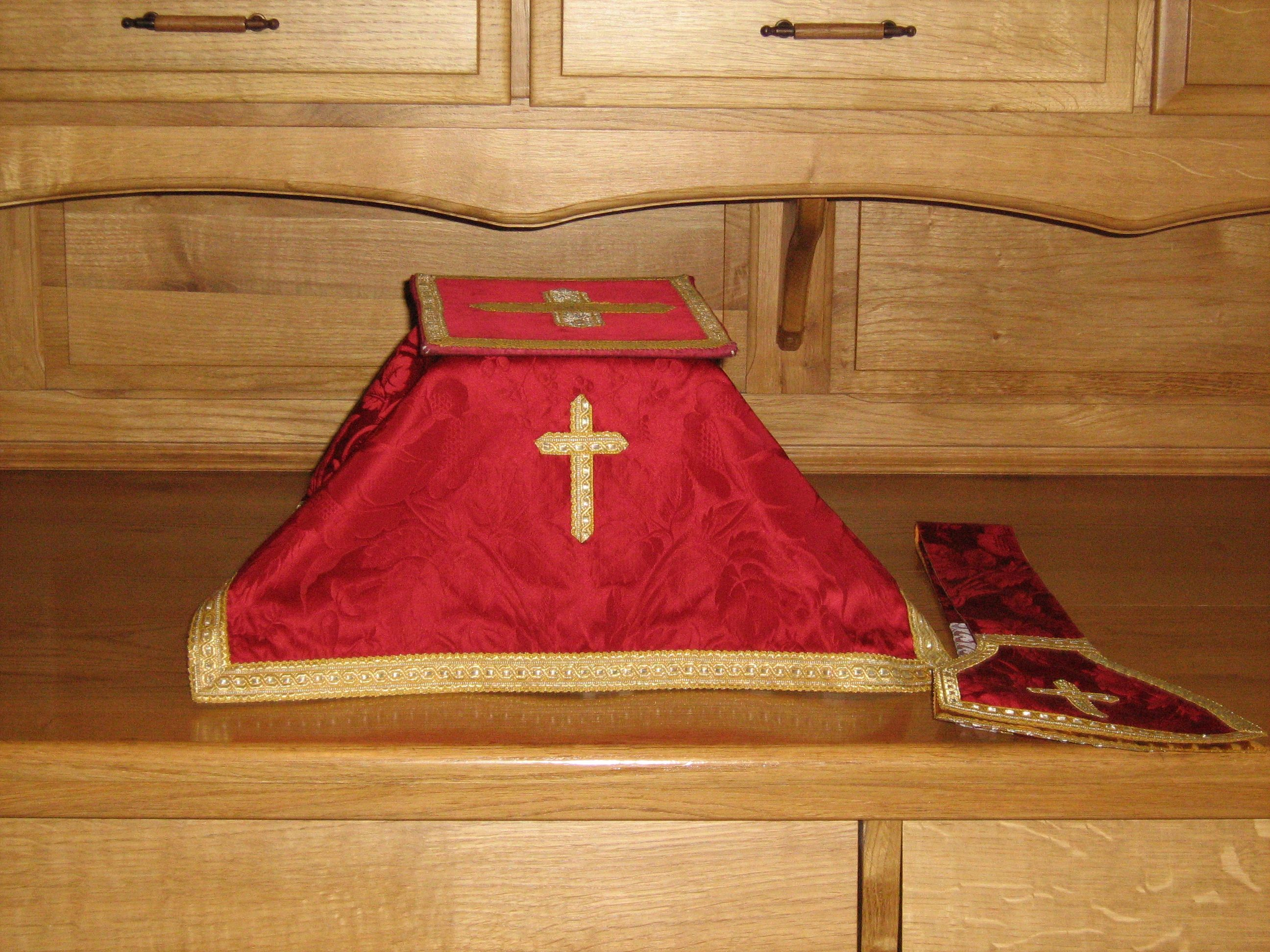
Chalice veil with bursa and maniple in the liturgical colour red

Paraments or parements (from Late Latin paramentum, "adornment", parare, "to prepare", "equip") are both the hangings or ornaments of a room of state, and the ecclesiastical vestments. Paraments include the liturgical hangings on and around the altar, such as altar cloths, as well as the cloths hanging from the pulpit and lectern, and in the ecclesiastical vestments category they include humeral veils and mitres.

In most Christian churches using paraments (including Roman Catholic and a wide variety of Protestant denominations), the liturgical paraments change in color depending on the season of the church year.

- Advent – purple (or, in some traditions, blue)
- Christmas – white
- Lent – purple
- Easter – white
- Pentecost, Good Friday, and the feasts of martyrs – red
- Ordinary Time – green
- All Souls' Day and Requiem Masses – black (optionally purple)

== See also ==
- Antependium
- Antimension
- Altar candle
- Chancel flowers
