= Maundy Thursday =

Christian holiday commemorating the Last Supper

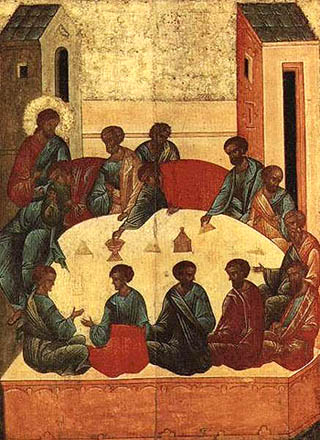
- The Mystical Supper, Russian Orthodox icon, 1497
- Also called: Holy Thursday; Covenant Thursday; Great and Holy Thursday; Thursday of Mysteries; Shere (from the word shere meaning "clean" or "bright") or Sheer Thursday
- Observed by: Christians
- Type: Christian/Civic
- Significance: Commemorates the Maundy and Last Supper of Jesus Christ
- Observances: Chrism Mass, Mass of the Lord's Supper, Washing of the feet, distribution of Maundy money
- Date: Easter − 3 days
- 2025 date: April 17 (Western); April 17 (Eastern)
- 2026 date: April 2 (Western); April 9 (Eastern)
- 2027 date: March 25 (Western); April 29 (Eastern)
- 2028 date: April 13 (Western); April 13 (Eastern)
- Frequency: annual
- Related to: Holy Week and Easter

Maundy Thursday, also referred to as Holy Thursday, Thursday of the Lord's Supper, or Passover among other names, (Note: The day is also known as Great and Holy Thursday, Holy and Great Thursday, Covenant Thursday, Sheer Thursday, and Thursday of Mysteries) is a Christian feast during Holy Week that marks the beginning of the Paschal Triduum, and commemorates the Washing of the Feet (Maundy) and Last Supper of Jesus Christ with the Apostles, as described in the canonical gospels.

It is the fifth day of Holy Week, preceded by Holy Wednesday (Spy Wednesday) and followed by Good Friday. (Note: Holy Week, or Passion Week, the week which immediately precedes Easter, and is devoted especially to commemorate the passion of our Lord. The Days more especially solemnized during it are Spy Wednesday, Maundy Thursday, Good Friday, and Holy Saturday) "Maundy" comes from the Latin word mandatum, or commandment, reflecting Jesus' words "I give you a new commandment." The date of the day will vary according to whether the Gregorian calendar or the Julian calendar is used. Eastern churches generally use the Julian system.

== Names ==
The Church of England, which is the mother Church of the Anglican Communion, uses name "Maundy Thursday" for this observance, though its Book of Common Prayer denotes the holy day as the "Thursday before Easter". However, the corresponding publication of the US Episcopal Church, which is another province of the Anglican Communion, refers to the Thursday before Easter as "Maundy Thursday". Throughout the Anglican Communion, the term "Holy Thursday" is a synonym for Ascension Day.

The Roman Rite of the Catholic Church uses the name "Holy Thursday" in its modern English-language liturgical books. The Latin books use the name Feria quinta in Cena Domini ("Thursday of the Supper of the Lord"; the medieval spelling Cœna was used in place of Cena in documents predating the 1955 decree Maxima redemptionis), along with Maundy Thursday as the English name, as given in The Saint Andrew Daily Missal. The personal ordinariates in the Catholic Church, which have an Anglican patrimony, retain the traditional English term "Maundy Thursday", however. An article in the 1911 Catholic Encyclopedia used the term "Maundy Thursday", and some Catholic writers use the same term either primarily, or alternatively.

The Methodist Book of Worship for Church and Home (1965) uses the term "Maundy Thursday"; the Book of Worship (1992) uses the term "Holy Thursday", and other official sources of the United Methodist Church use both "Maundy Thursday" and "Holy Thursday".

Both names are used by other Christian denominations as well, including the Lutheran Church, and certain Reformed Churches. Certain Presbyterian Churches use the term "Maundy Thursday" to refer to the holy day in their official sources.

In the Byzantine Rite the name for the holy day is "Great and Holy Thursday" or "Holy Thursday", and in Western Rite Orthodoxy "Maundy Thursday", "Holy Thursday" or both. The Coptic Orthodox Church uses the term "Covenant Thursday" or "Thursday of the Covenant".

In the Maronite Church and the Syriac Orthodox Church, the name is "Thursday of Mysteries".

"Maundy Thursday" is the official name of the day in the civil legislation of England and the Philippines.

The day has also been known in English as Shere Thursday (also spelled Sheer Thursday), from the word shere (meaning "clean" or "bright"). (Note: Maundy Thursday is the day immediately preceding Good Friday. It was also known as Shere Thursday, probably from a custom of the priests, who on this day are said to have shaved themselves and trimmed their hair, which had been allowed to grow during the preceding six weeks. An old chronicle says 'people would this day shere theyr hedes, and clypp theyr berdes, and so make them honest against Easter Day.')

This name might refer to the act of cleaning, or to the fact that churches would switch liturgical colors from the dark tones of Lent, or because it was customary to shear the beard on that day, or for a combination of reasons. This name has cognates in the Nordic languages, such as Danish skærtorsdag, Swedish skärtorsdag, Norwegian skjærtorsdag, Faroese skírhósdagur and skírisdagur, Icelandic skírdagur, and Finnish kiirastorstai.

Maundy Thursday is sometimes erroneously called "Easter Thursday" (which properly refers to the Thursday after Easter), especially in Australia, where the Australian Football League regularly has an "Easter Thursday" game.

=== Derivation of the name "Maundy" ===
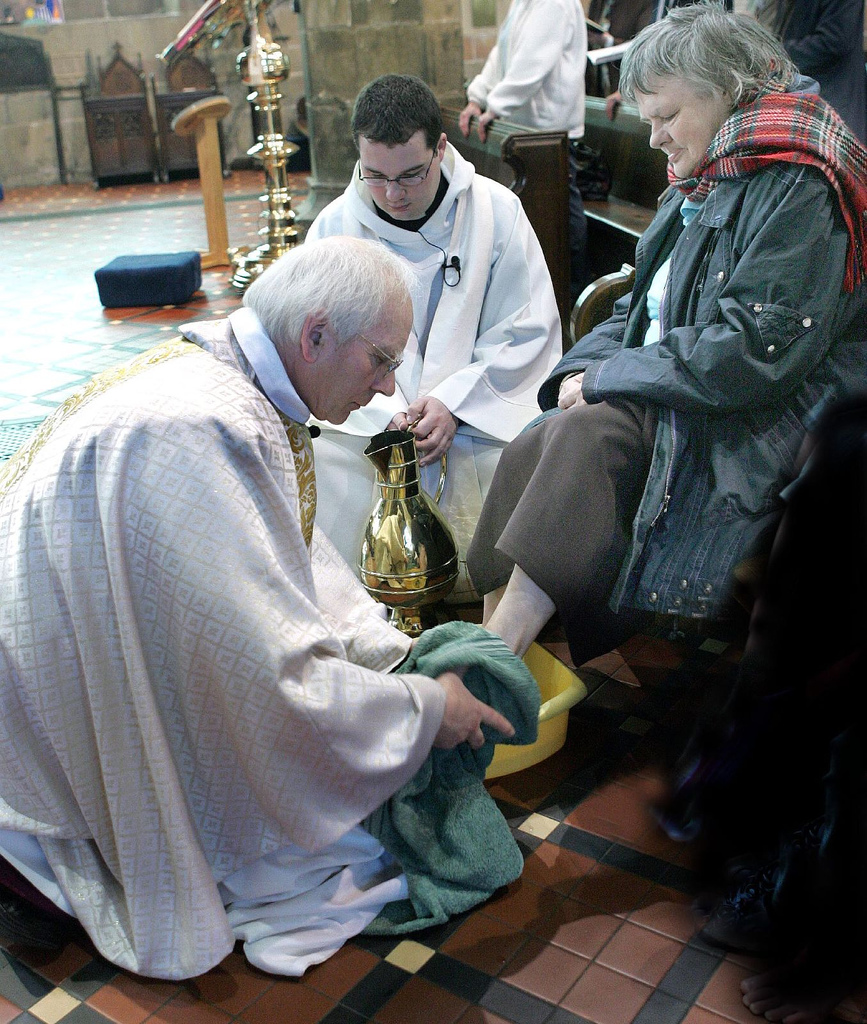
Maundy ceremony in a Church in Wales parish church during a Maundy Thursday service of worship

Maundy is the name of the Christian rite of footwashing, (Note: Maundy Thursday (or le mandé; Thursday of the Mandatum, Latin, commandment). The name is taken from the first few words sung at the ceremony of the washing of the feet, 'I give you a new commandment' (John 13:34); also from the commandment of Christ that we should imitate His loving humility in the washing of the feet (John 13:14–17). The term mandatum (maundy), therefore, was applied to the rite of foot-washing on this day.-- which traditionally occurs during Maundy Thursday church services.)

The English word maundy in the name for the day is derived through Middle English and Old French mandé, from the Latin mandatum (also the origin of the English word "mandate"), the first word of the phrase "Mandatum novum do vobis ut diligatis invicem sicut dilexi vos" ("A new commandment I give to you: That you love one another, as I have loved you.") By this statement in chapter 13 of the Gospel of John, Jesus explained to the Apostles the significance of his action of washing their feet.

The phrase is used as the antiphon sung in the Roman Rite during the Maundy (Ecclesiastical Latin: "Mandatum") ceremony of the washing of the feet, which may be held during Mass or as a separate event. A priest or bishop, representing Christ, ceremonially washes the feet of others, typically 12 persons chosen as a cross-section of the community. In 2016, it was announced that the Roman Missal had been revised to allow women to participate as part of the 12 in the Mandatum. Previously, only males partook of the rite.

Others theorize that the English name "Maundy Thursday" arose from "maunds" or baskets or "maundy purses" of alms which the king of England distributed to certain poor at Whitehall before attending Mass on that day. Thus, "maund" is connected to the Latin mendicare, and French mendier, to beg.

== Services ==
=== Western Christianity ===
Maundy Thursday initiates the Paschal Triduum, the period which commemorates the passion, death, and resurrection of Jesus. This period includes Good Friday and Holy Saturday, and ends on the evening of Easter Sunday. The Mass of the Lord's Supper or service of worship is normally celebrated in the evening, when Friday begins according to Jewish tradition, as the Last Supper was held on the feast of Passover, according to the three Synoptic Gospels.

==== Services ====
In the United Kingdom, the Royal Maundy service involves the Monarch offering "alms" to deserving senior citizens – one man and one woman for each year of the sovereign's age. These coins, known as Maundy money or Royal Maundy, are distributed in red and white purses, and is a custom dating back to King Edward I. The red purse contains regular currency and is given in place of food and clothing. The white purse has money in the amount of one penny for each year of the Sovereign's age. Since 1822, rather than ordinary money, the Sovereign gives out Maundy coins, which are specially minted 1, 2, 3 and 4 penny pieces, and are legal tender. The service at which this takes place rotates around English and Welsh churches, though in 2008 it took place for the first time in Northern Ireland at Armagh Cathedral. Until the death of King James II, the Monarch would also wash the feet of the selected poor people. A miniature painting attributed to Levina Teerlinc, An Elizabethan Maundy (c. 1560), depicts Queen Elizabeth I washing people's feet during the ceremony.

The Maundy (washing of the feet) is practised among many Christian groups on Maundy Thursday, including the Anglican/Protestant Episcopal, Armenian, Ethiopian, Lutheran, Methodist, Eastern Catholic, Schwarzenau (German Baptist) Brethren, Mennonite, Presbyterian and Roman Catholic traditions.

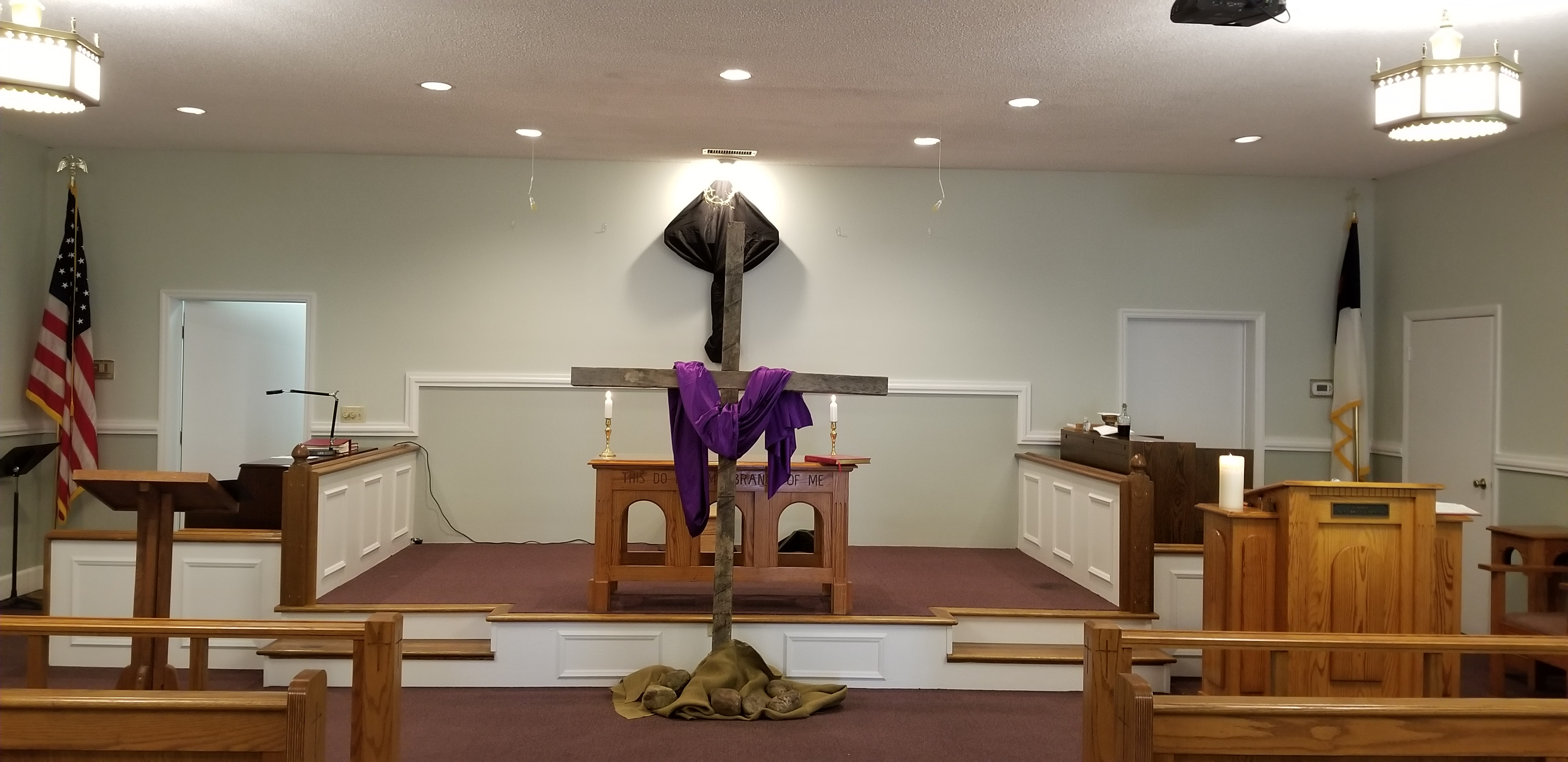
Altar and crucifix veiled in a Methodist church on Maundy Thursday in preparation for Good Friday

With Maundy Thursday commemorating the Last Supper, Christian denominations who observe this day universally celebrate the sacrament of Holy Communion, which they teach was instituted by Jesus on this night. In the Catholic Church, the Lutheran Church and in certain Anglican congregations, the Mass of the Lord's Supper begins as usual, but the Gloria is accompanied by the ringing of church bells, which are then silent until the Easter Vigil. After the homily the washing of feet may be performed. The Blessed Sacrament remains exposed, at least in the Catholic Mass, until the service concludes with a procession taking it to the place of reposition. The altar is later stripped bare, as are all other altars in the church except the Altar of Repose. In pre-1970 editions, the Roman Missal of the Catholic Church envisages this being done ceremonially, to the accompaniment of Psalms 21–22, a practice which continues in the Lutheran churches and Anglican churches of Anglo-Catholic churchmanship. In other Christian denominations, such as the Methodist Churches, the stripping of the altar and other items on the chancel also occurs, as a preparation for the somber Good Friday service. The stripping of the altar represents "the abandonment of Jesus by his disciples and the stripping of Jesus by the soldiers before his crucifixion."

==== Chrism Mass ====
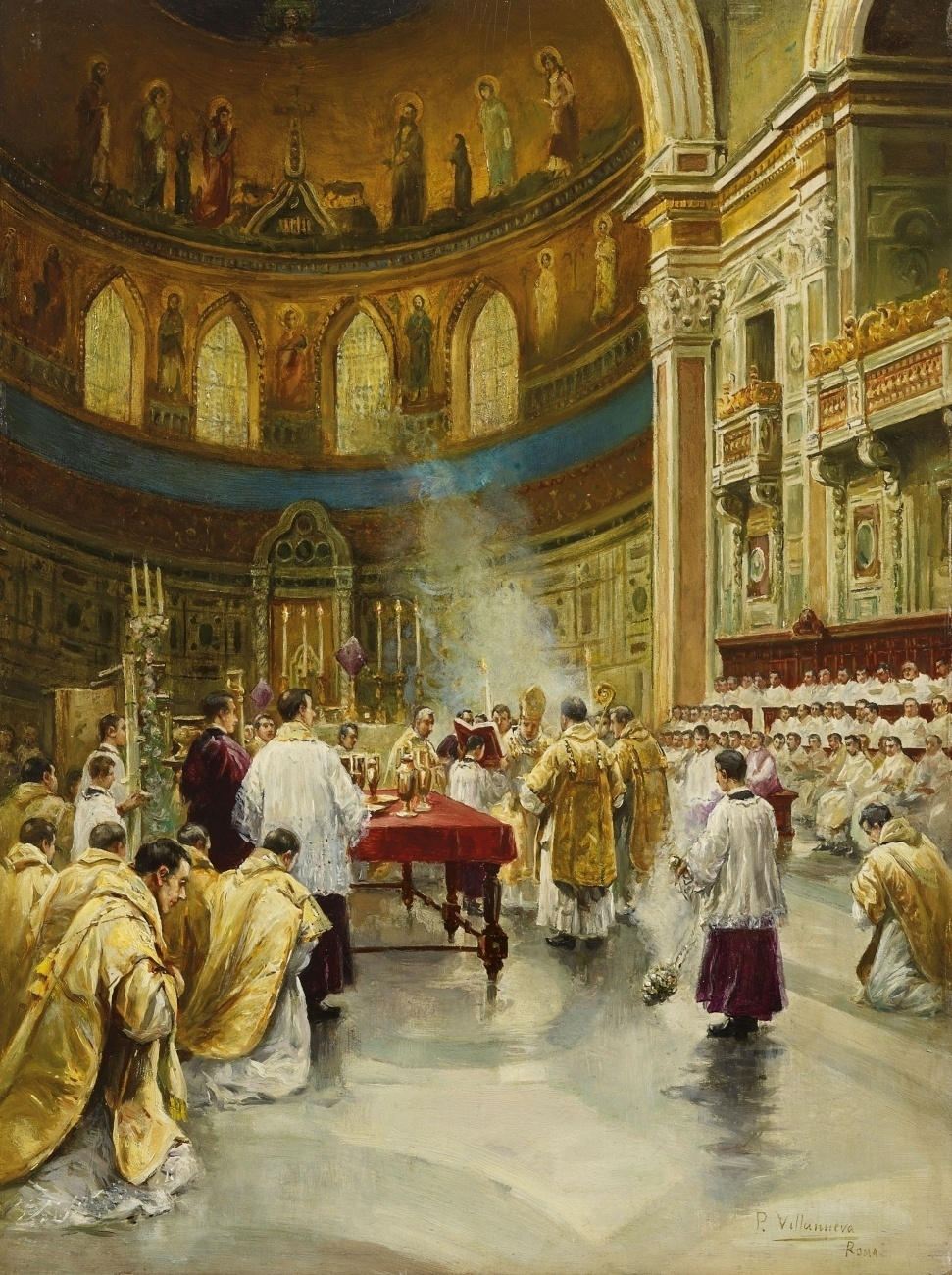
Chrism Mass in the Lateran Basilica

The Chrism Mass is a religious service held in Roman Catholicism, Lutheranism and Anglicanism.

Maundy Thursday is notable for being the day on which the Chrism Mass is celebrated in each diocese. Usually held in the diocesan cathedral, it is generally held on the morning of Maundy Thursday, but may in some dioceses take place on another day during Holy Week. The Mass is a celebration of the institution of the priesthood.

During the Mass, those present are called to renew their baptismal promises. Priests/ministers and deacons also reaffirm their ministry by renewing the promises made at their ordination. The Mass takes its name from the blessing of the holy oils used in the sacraments throughout the year, which are then given to priests to take back to their parishes.

The service is a 1967 restoration of the rite recorded in the early 200s by the historian Hippolytus who writes of a ceremony taking place during the Easter Vigil at which two holy oils were blessed and one was consecrated. In the decree renewing this rite Pope Paul VI said, "The Chrism Mass is one of the principal expressions of the fullness of the bishop's priesthood and signifies the closeness of the priests with him."

The Holy Oils are:

- Chrism – used in the sacraments of Baptism, Confirmation and Holy Orders, as well as for the consecration of altars and the dedication of churches.
- the oil of catechumens – also used in the sacrament of Baptism, and
- the oil of the sick – used in the rite of the Anointing of the Sick

The oil of the catechumens and chrism are used on the upcoming Holy Saturday at the Easter Vigil, for the baptism and confirmation of those entering the church. While the Oil of the Catechumens and the Oil of the Sick, are simply "blessed", the Sacred Chrism is "consecrated". Holy chrism is a mixture of olive oil and balsam, an aromatic resin. Balsam is poured into the oil, which gives it a sweet smell intended to remind those who encounter it of the "odor of sanctity" to which those who are marked with it, are called to strive.

With respect to Anglicanism, the 1979 Book of Common Prayer (p. 307) calls for chrism to be consecrated by the bishop. In many dioceses, the consecration of chrism by the bishop may be done at a service of reaffirmation of ordination vows during Holy Week. During the Chrism Eucharist, the Bishop will bless the oils used throughout the next year for baptisms and healing. In addition, the Bishop and clergy in attendance will reaffirm their Ordination Vows.

==== Plenary indulgence ====
In the Roman Catholic Church, plenary indulgence is obtained in the following cases:

1. If, following the Mass of the Lord's Supper, the Eucharistic hymn Tantum ergo is recited or sung during the solemn reservation of the Blessed Sacrament (typically on a side altar).
2. If the solemnly reserved Blessed Sacrament is adored for a half hour.

=== Eastern Christianity ===
==== Eastern Orthodoxy ====
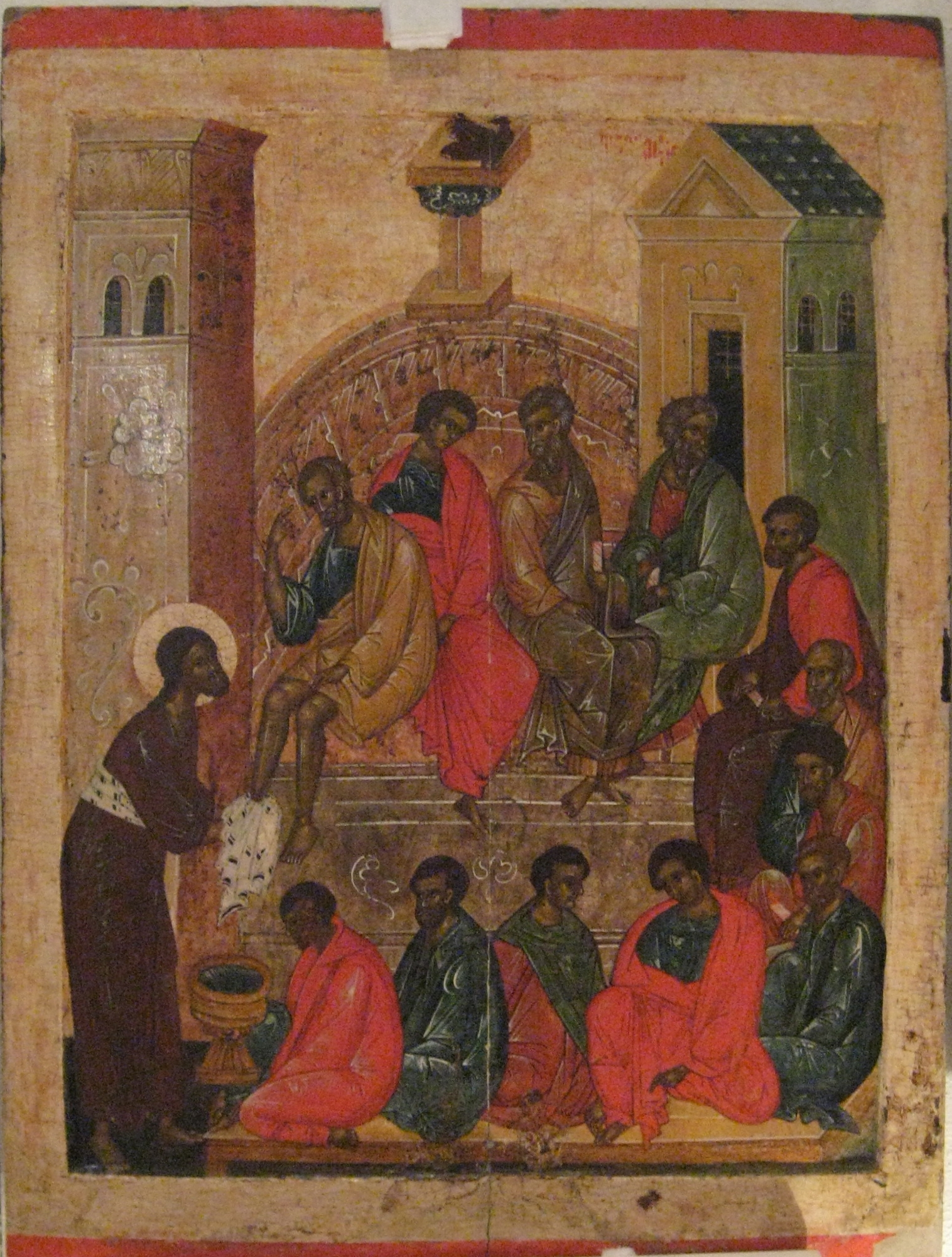
Orthodox icon of Christ washing the feet of the Apostles (16th century, Pskov school of iconography)

In the Eastern Orthodox Church, the liturgical colours are brighter, white being common. On this day alone during Holy Week, the fast is relaxed to permit consumption of wine and oil.

The primary service of this day is Vespers combined with the Liturgy of St. Basil the Great at which is read a Composite Gospel, primarily taken from Matthew, but with episodes inserted from John (the Washing of the Feet) and Luke (Jesus sweating blood), and many of the normal hymns of the Divine Liturgy are substituted with the following troparion:

Of Thy Mystical Supper, O Son of God, accept me today as a communicant; for I will not speak of Thy Mystery to Thine enemies, neither will I give Thee a kiss like Judas. But like the Thief will I confess Thee: Remember me, O Lord, in Thy Kingdom.

When necessary to replenish the sacrament for communing the sick at a time not following a divine liturgy, an additional Lamb (Host) is consecrated on this day, intincted, covered, and left to dry until Holy Saturday when it is divided, completely dried with a candle flame, and the pieces placed in the artophorion.

In cathedrals and monasteries the ceremony of the Washing of Feet is normally performed. When there is need to consecrate more chrism, that is performed by patriarchs and other heads of the various autocephalous churches.

Maunday Thursday and other named days and day ranges around Lent and Easter in Western Christianity, with the fasting days of Lent numbered

In the evening, after the Liturgy, all of the hangings and vestments are changed to black or some other dark colour, to signify the beginning of the Passion. Anticipating the Matins of Friday morning, the Holy Passion service of the reading of the Twelve Gospels is conducted. In these readings Christ's last instructions to his disciples are presented, as well as the prophecy of the drama of the Cross, Christ's prayer, and his new commandment. The twelve readings are:

- John 13:31–18:1
- John 18:1–29
- Matthew 26:57–75
- John 18:28–19:16
- Matthew 27:3–32
- Mark 15:16–32
- Matthew 27:33–54
- Luke 23:32–49
- John 19:19–37
- Mark 15:43–47
- John 19:38–42
- Matthew 27:62–66

Beginning on Holy and Great Thursday, the memorial service for the dead is forbidden until after Thomas Sunday.

==== Oriental Orthodoxy ====
Oriental Orthodox Churches celebrate Covenant Thursday during Holy Week (based on their local calendars). They offer praises and vespers every day of week, and on Thursday and Saturday they remain in church praising God and reading about the First Liturgy and Judas' Betrayal. On Saturday they sing praises for the Entrance of the Messiah in Hades freeing all of the faithful ones including Moses and Abraham.

== Customs and names around the world ==
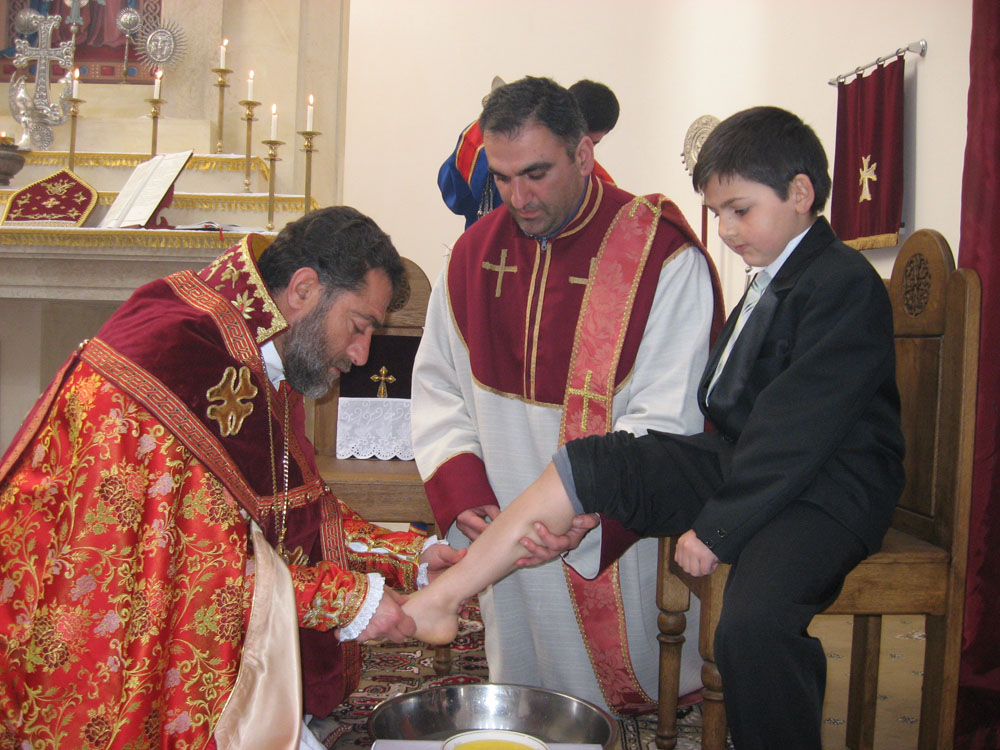
Bishop Sebouh Chouldjian (Armenian Apostolic Church) washing the feet of children during the Washing of Feet ceremony

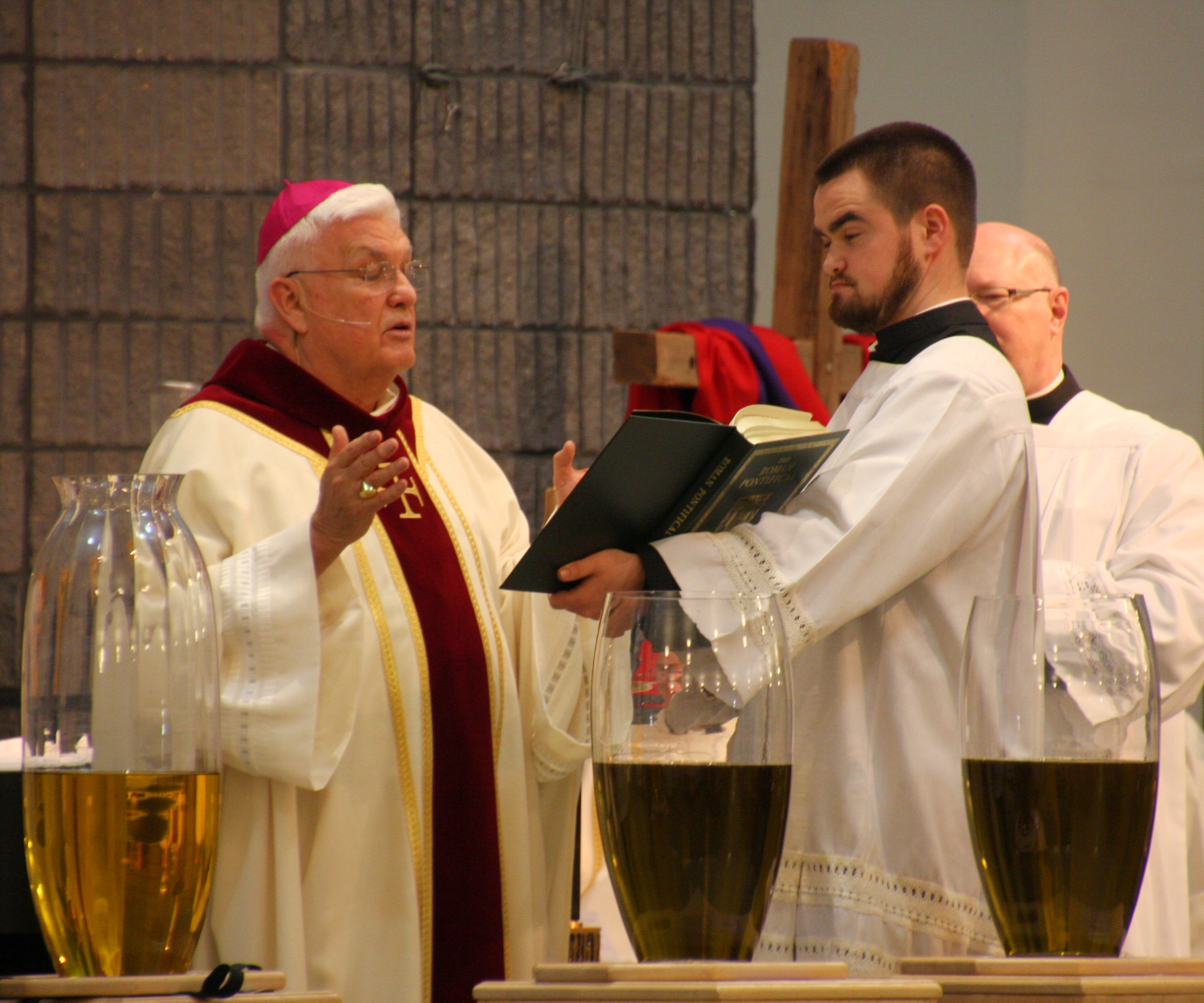
Blessing Chrism

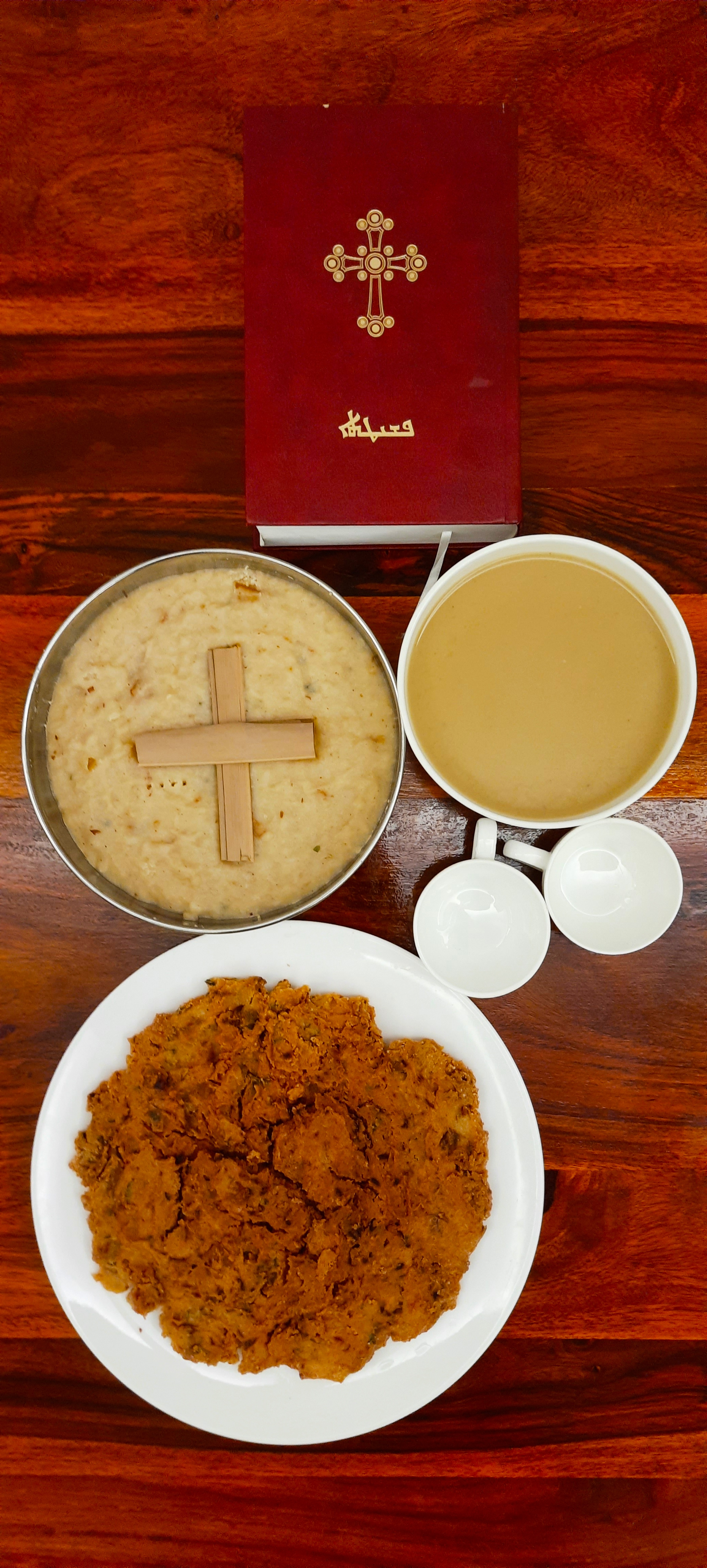
Pesaha appam (unleavened bread) and Pesaha milk made during Maundy Thursday by Saint Thomas Christians of Kerala, India

- If statues and crucifixes have been covered during Passiontide (the last 2 weeks of Lent, at least in the 1962 Catholic missal), the crucifix covers are allowed to be white instead of purple for Holy Thursday.
- The popular German name Gründonnerstag means either "mourning Thursday" or "green Thursday". In the Rhine-Main area, the day is celebrated by eating the traditional green sauce with potatoes, boiled eggs and sometimes schnitzel.
- In the Czech Republic and Slovakia, the day is called Zelený čtvrtek or Zelený štvrtok respectively, again meaning "Green Thursday", because the typical meals of this day were made of fresh, green vegetables etc. From that day there is no usage of the church bells until Holy Saturday, here called "White Saturday", because "they have flown to Rome" (a euphemism); in some regions they are replaced by groups of children walking round their village (or around the church) and making noise with wooden rattles. This is to announce to the people approaching beginning of the liturgy and to call the people to church.
- The tradition of silent bells also occurs in Luxembourg: the bells fall silent until Easter, because "they have flown to Rome for Confession", so children take to the streets, calling people to church with melancholy wooden rattling.
- In the Netherlands and Belgium, the day is called Witte Donderdag (White Thursday) referring to the liturgical colour of the day.
- In Malta, Holy Thursday is known as Ħamis ix-Xirka (Communion Thursday) and the tradition of visiting seven churches (see below) is called is-seba' visti or is-Sepulkri.
- Eastern Slavic cultures traditionally carried out a range of cleansing ceremonies on Maundy Thursday (sometimes known in Russian as "Clean Thursday" (Russian: Чистый четверг)).
- In Welsh, Maundy Thursday is Dydd Iau Cablyd.
- In Sweden, Maundy Thursday (skärtorsdagen) is connected to old folklore as the day of the witches. Young children often dress up as witches and knock on doors getting coins or candy for Easter eggs.
- In Greek practice, the Mystery of Unction is performed on Great Wednesday as preparation for the reception of Holy Communion on Great Thursday and Pascha, a custom that originated when Greece was under Ottoman control and parish priests, being uneducated, were not permitted to hear confession, so this sacrament, by which sins are believed to be forgiven, came to be performed.
- In Greek tradition, a procession is made during the service of the Twelve Passion Gospels. It takes place after the reading of the fifth gospel during the singing of "Today He Who Hung". During this procession, a large cross with the body of Christ is carried throughout the church while lights are extinguished, bells are slowly tolled, and the faithful prostrate themselves. The cross, with Christ's body hung upon it, is placed in front of the Royal Doors. The icon of Christ on the cross (sometimes with nails affixing it) is struck upon the hands and feet with a stone multiple times, and is then stood up in front of the church, where it is censed.
- In some Slavic traditions, a lesser procession is made after the Twelve Passion Gospels immediately prior to the dismissal with an icon of Christ's crucifixion which is placed on the central icon stand, where it is censed by the clergy, and then venerated.
- In Bulgaria, Maundy Thursday is called Veliki Chetvurtuk (Great Thursday), and is traditionally the day when people color their Easter eggs and perform other household chores geared toward preparing for Razpeti Petuk (Crucifixion Friday), Velika Subota (Great Saturday) and Velikden (Easter Day).
- In Kerala, the day is called Pesaha (പെസഹ), a Malayalam word derived from the Aramaic or Syriac word "Peshai" meaning Passover. Maundy Thursday and the following Good Friday are observed as statewide public holidays in Kerala, owing to the large population of Syrian Christians in the state. Saint Thomas Christians traditionally prepare Pesaha appam, an unleavened bread, and Pesaha Paal, a drink made of coconut milk sweetened with jaggery, to be shared among the family after prayers on the evening before Good Friday.
- In the Philippines, the day is officially known as Huwebes Santo (phonetic transliteration of Jueves Santo in Spanish, Holy Thursday) or "Maundy Thursday". Most businesses are closed during the Easter Triduum, with shopping malls opening on Black Saturday. Terrestrial television and radio stations either go completely off-air during the Triduum or operate on shorter hours with special programming; cable channels usually retain their normal programming. Newspapers do not publish on Good Friday and Black Saturday.

=== Public holiday ===
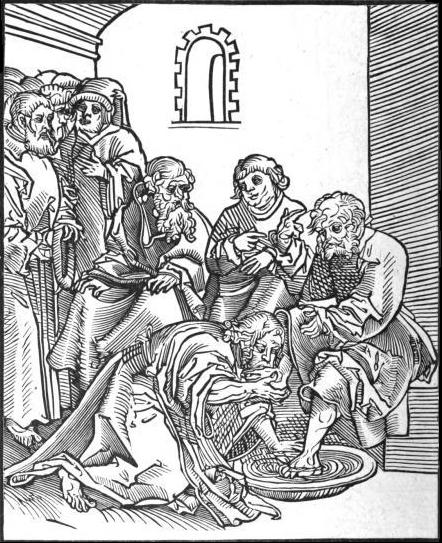
Christus, by the Lutheran Lucas Cranach the Elder. This woodcut of John 13:14–17 is from Passionary of the Christ and Antichrist.

Maundy Thursday is a public holiday in most countries that were part of the Spanish Empire (Argentina, Colombia, Costa Rica, El Salvador, Guatemala, Honduras, Mexico, Nicaragua, Paraguay, Peru, the Philippines, Spain, Uruguay and Venezuela), countries that were part of the Danish colonial empire (Denmark, Iceland, Norway and United States Virgin Islands), and in the Indian state of Kerala. Certain German states declare a public holiday for public sector employees. In the UK, civil servants were traditionally granted a half-day holiday (known as "privilege leave") on this date, but that was abolished by David Cameron in 2012.

=== Seven Churches Visitation ===
The tradition of visiting seven churches on Holy Thursday is an ancient practice, probably originating in Rome. and occurs among the faithful in countries around the world.

In India, the custom is to visit fourteen churches, one per Station of the Cross. Traditionally, this is performed on Maundy Thursday evening but is more often done on the morning of Good Friday or on any day of Lent. Usually, whole families would participate, customarily fasting for the duration of the rite. It is also undertaken by parish devotional groups.

In the Philippines the tradition is called Visita Iglesia (Spanish, "church visit") – people visit churches to pray, usually reciting the Stations of the Cross. It is a chiefly urban custom, as churches are located closer to each other in cities, and supposedly because it originates in visiting the seven churches of Intramuros that stood until the 1945 Bombing of Manila. The original purpose of the ritual was to venerate the Blessed Sacrament in the Altar of Repose on Maundy Thursday night, but since no prayers were prescribed (apart from those for the Pope), the Stations of the Cross were recited.

In Singapore, the visiting of churches occurs shortly after the evening Mass of the Lord's Supper. Prayers at each church consist of seven repetitions of the Lord's Prayer, Ave Maria, and the Gloria Patri. Due to the new trend of late Mass times (sometimes 7 or 8 pm) to allow for more churchgoers, eight churches are the maximum number visited (even in the city area, where these are closer to each other than in outer residential areas) before these close at midnight. A festive atmosphere exists, with the sale of drinks, hot cross buns and other local snacks like the traditional kueh ko chee. Observant Catholics have a 'Last Supper' meal in anticipation of the next day's fast.

== Gallery ==
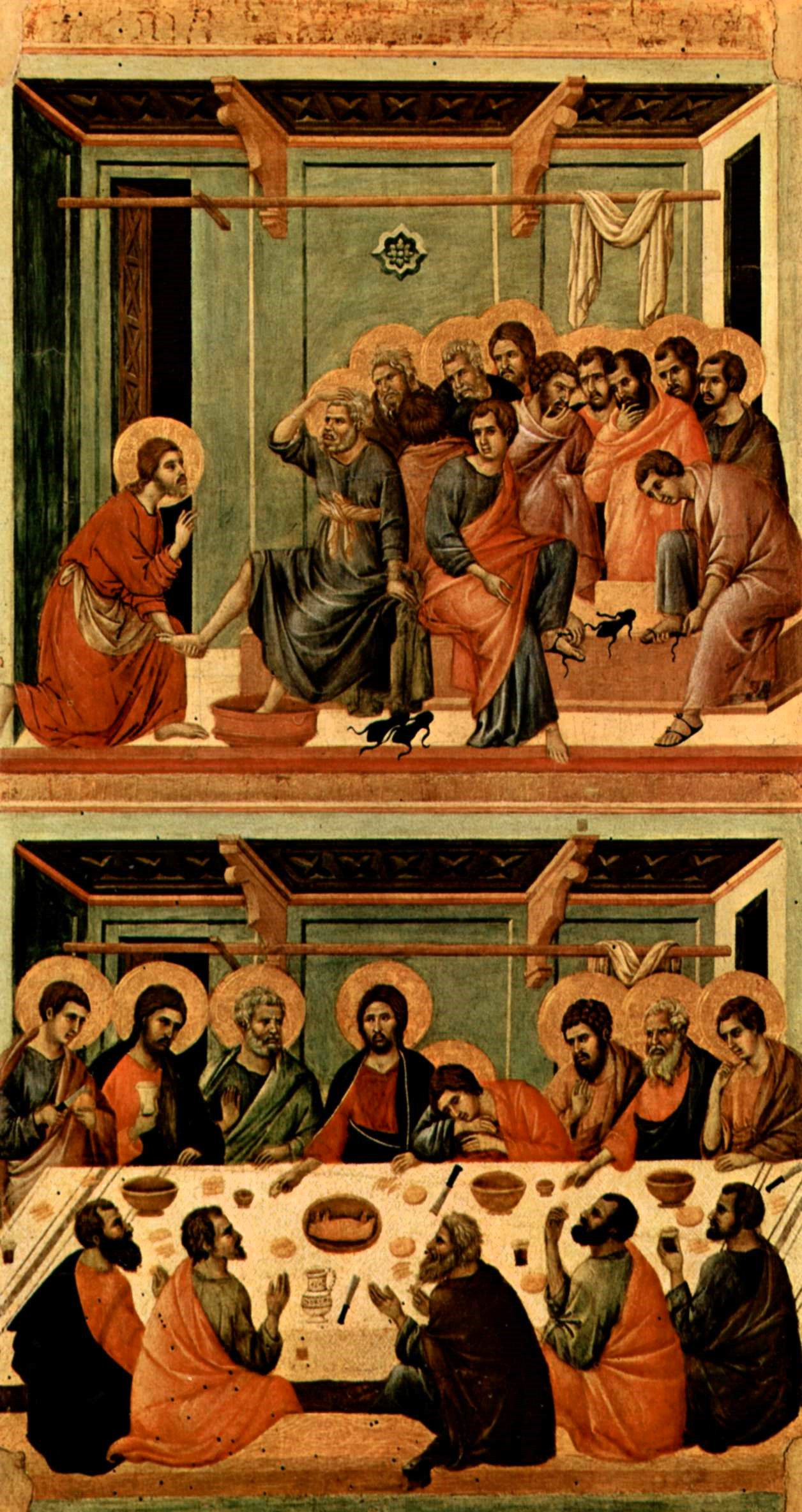
Washing of the Feet and the Last Supper, painting of Altar of Siena Cathedral in 14th century

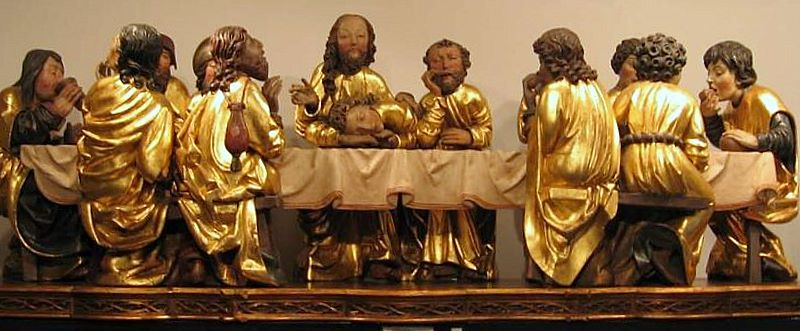
"The Last Supper" – museum copy of Master Paul's sculpture

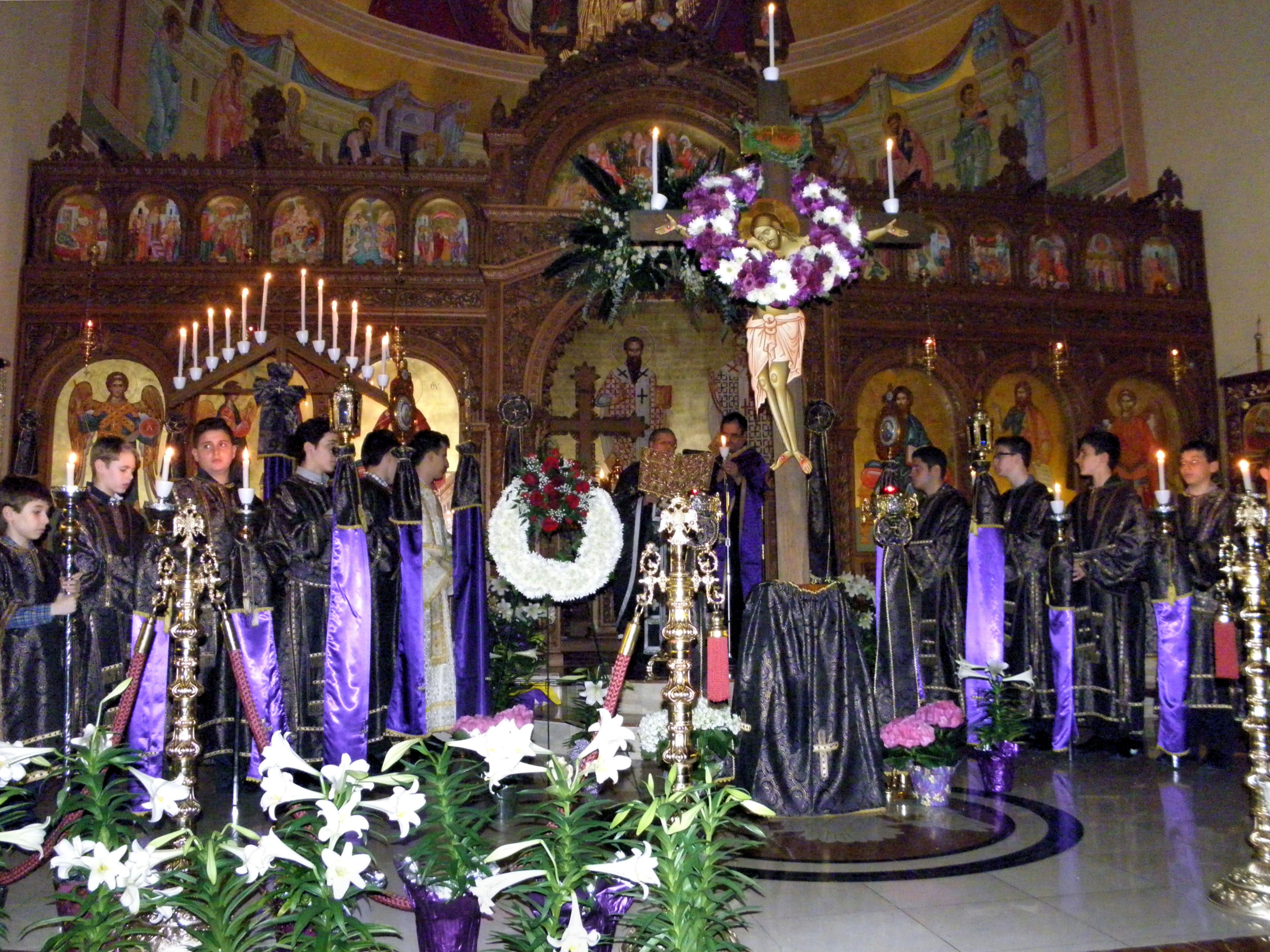
Reading of the 12th Passion Gospel on Great and Holy Thursday

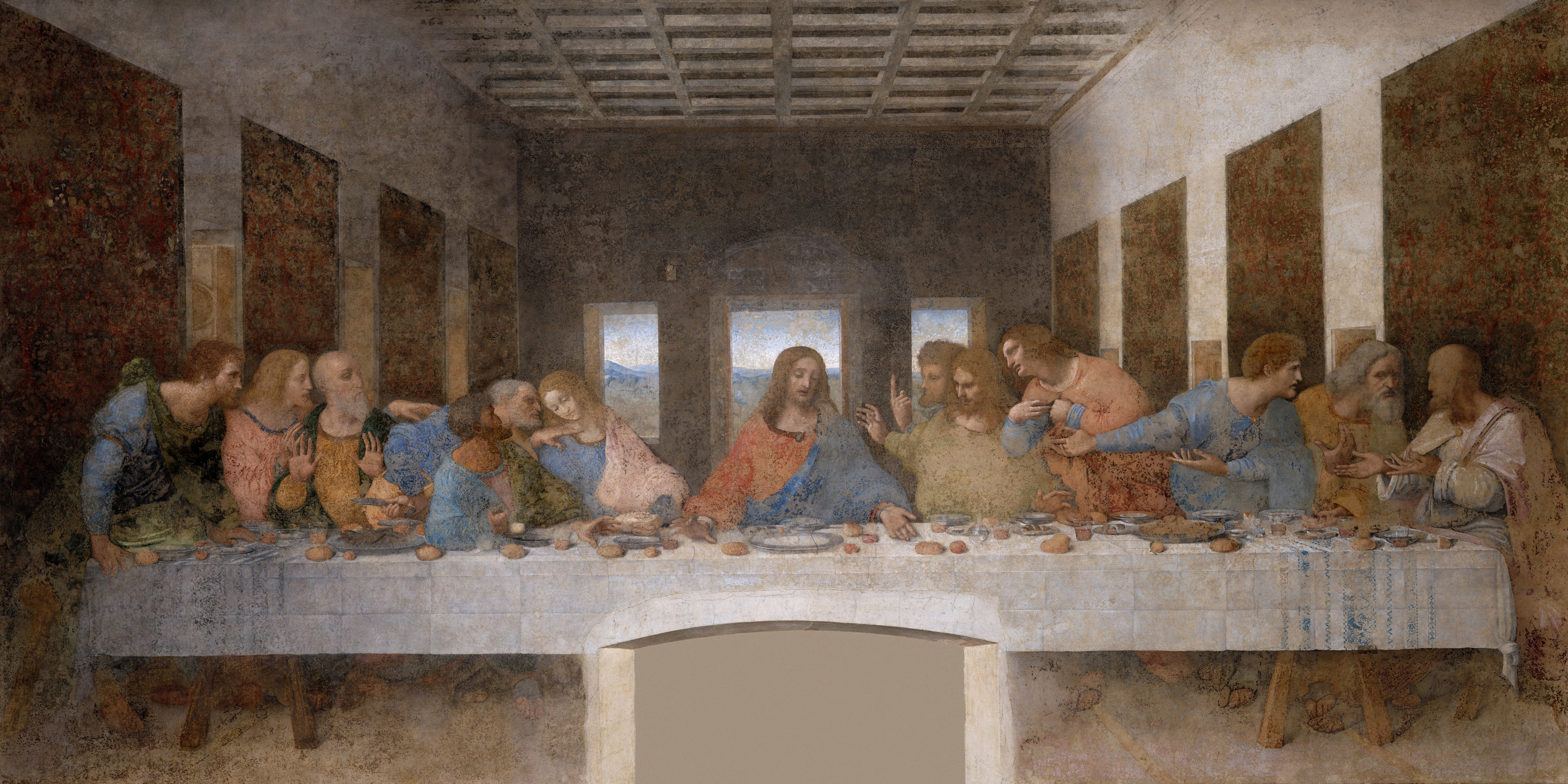
Leonardo da Vinci's The Last Supper painting, located inside the Santa Maria delle Grazie, in Milan, Italy

== See also ==
- Corpus Christi
- Friday of Sorrows (Friday before Palm Sunday)
- Life of Jesus in the New Testament
- Paschal cycle
- Tenebrae (service)
- Thursday of the Dead
- Tristis est anima mea (responsory), second responsory for the Tenebrae at Maundy Thursday

== Bibliography ==
- Herbermann, Charles, ed. (1913). "Maundy Thursday" . Catholic Encyclopedia. New York: Robert Appleton Company.
