= Seven Churches Visitation =

Catholic Lenten tradition on Maundy Thursday

The Seven Churches Visitation is an originally Catholic Lenten tradition to visit seven churches on the evening of Holy Thursday. Following the Mass of the Lord's Supper, the Blessed Sacrament is placed on the Altar of Repose in the church for adoration. During the Seven Churches Visitation, the faithful visit several churches – traditionally seven, very rarely fourteen, sometimes no set number depending upon the particular practice – to pray before the Blessed Sacrament in each church. The Seven Churches Visitation has been done in an ecumenical context, involving Catholic, Methodist, Episcopal, Aglipayan, and Salvationist traditions, among others.

== History ==
The tradition of visiting seven churches on Holy Thursday probably originated in Rome, as early pilgrims visited the seven basilicas as penance.

The Via Francigena was an ancient pilgrim route between England and Rome. It was customary to end the pilgrimage with a visit to the tombs of Sts Peter and Paul. In 1300 Pope Boniface VIII declared the first Holy Year, granting a special indulgence to those, who meeting the requisite conditions, visited St. Peter's Basilica and the Basilica of Saint Paul Outside the Walls. Over time, the number of prescribed churches increased to seven.

The tradition of visiting all seven churches was started by Philip Neri around 1553. He and a few friends would gather before dawn and set out on their "Seven Churches Walk". These pilgrimages were designed to be a counterpoint to the raucous behavior of Carnival. The Walks became very popular and began to attract others.

== Practice ==
After the Mass of the Lord's Supper, during which the faithful remember Jesus Christ's last meal with his apostles on the night that he was arrested, they remember Christ's Agony in the Garden. After Mass, the main altar and most side altars are stripped; all crosses are either removed or covered; the Blessed Sacrament is placed in a tabernacle on the Altar of Repose, and churches stay open late for silent adoration. This is in response to the request Jesus made to his apostles while they were in the Garden of Gethsemane, as recorded in Gospel of Matthew 26:40, "Could you not, then, watch one hour with me?"

Those who practice this visitation leave the church where they attended the Mass of the Lord's Supper and travel to nearby churches to pray before the Blessed Sacrament. This is more common in urban areas where churches are in close proximity, thus making traveling easier. There are no set prayers in the Catholic Church for this devotion, except to pray for the intentions of the reigning pope and recite the Lord's Prayer, Hail Mary, and Gloria Patri. People also opt to pray the Stations of the Cross.

Saint Philip Neri drew up an itinerary in order to combine conviviality and the sharing of a common religious experience by discovering of the heritage of the early Saints. In modern times, pilgrimages are often arranged by parish organizations and co-ordinated with other parishes in the area.

== By country ==
=== Philippines ===
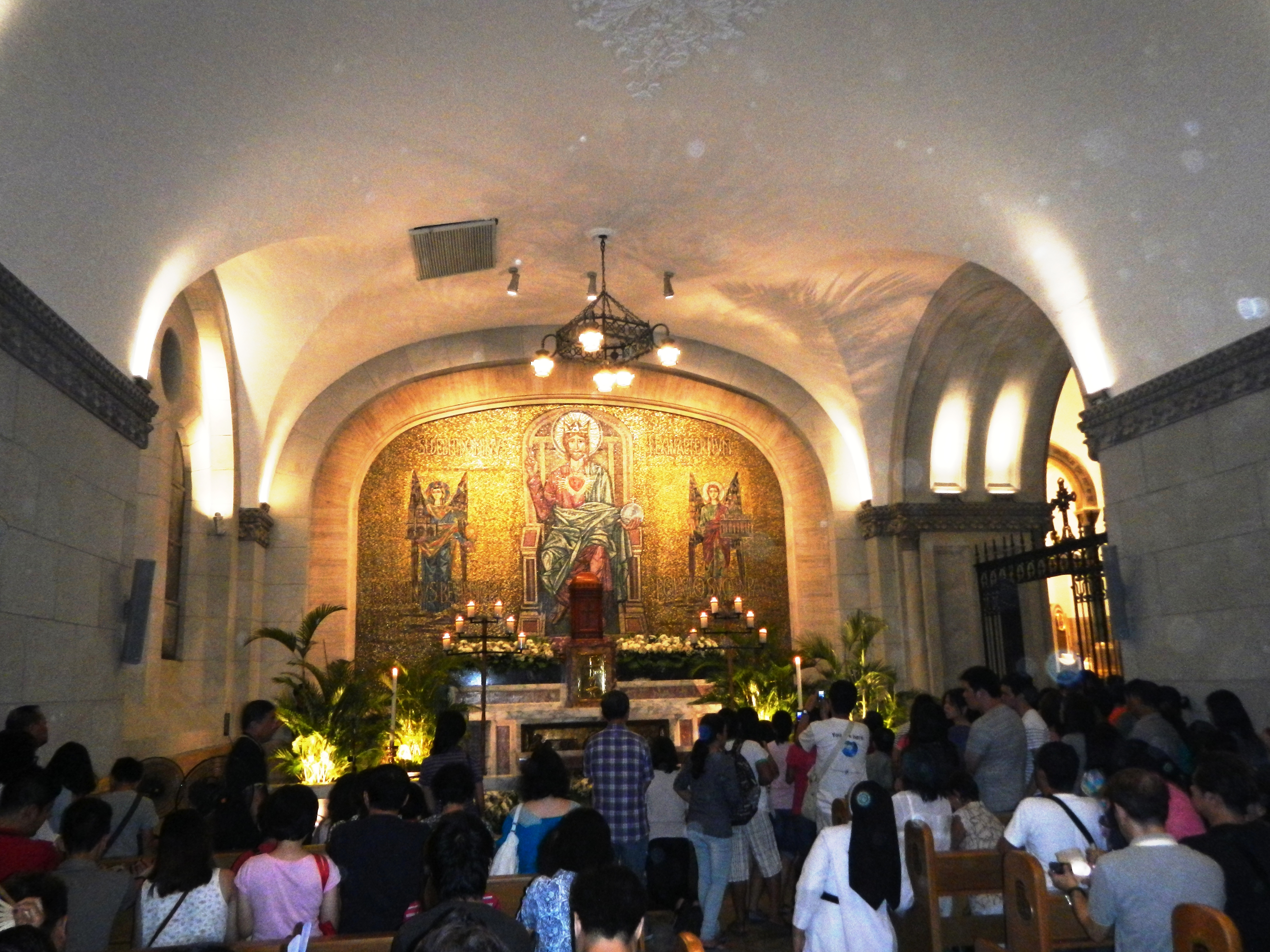
Altar of Repose in Manila Cathedral, Philippines, 17 April 2014.

In the Philippines, the tradition is called Visita Iglesia. The general practice is to visit seven churches either on Maundy Thursday or Good Friday, and recite the Stations of the Cross. The pious and able would double the number of churches to fourteen, while the infirm and elderly usually visit only one or a handful. Until the 1970s, people recited all fourteen Stations in each church, but the more recent form is to pray two Stations per church.

The more devout would carry a wooden cross with them, while others consider the ritual an opportunity for sightseeing. An offering is usually made at each church and to the poor as a form of almsgiving. To accommodate the faithful, many Catholic churches during Holy Week remain open until midnight. While traditionally done on Maundy Thursday, after the Mass of the Last Supper, it is now common to perform Visita Iglesia on any day during Holy Week.

Since 2010, a bicycle tour version known as Bisikleta Iglesia has gained popularity: pilgrims would bike along a route covering seven churches, and as a group pray the Stations in the usual manner.

=== United States ===
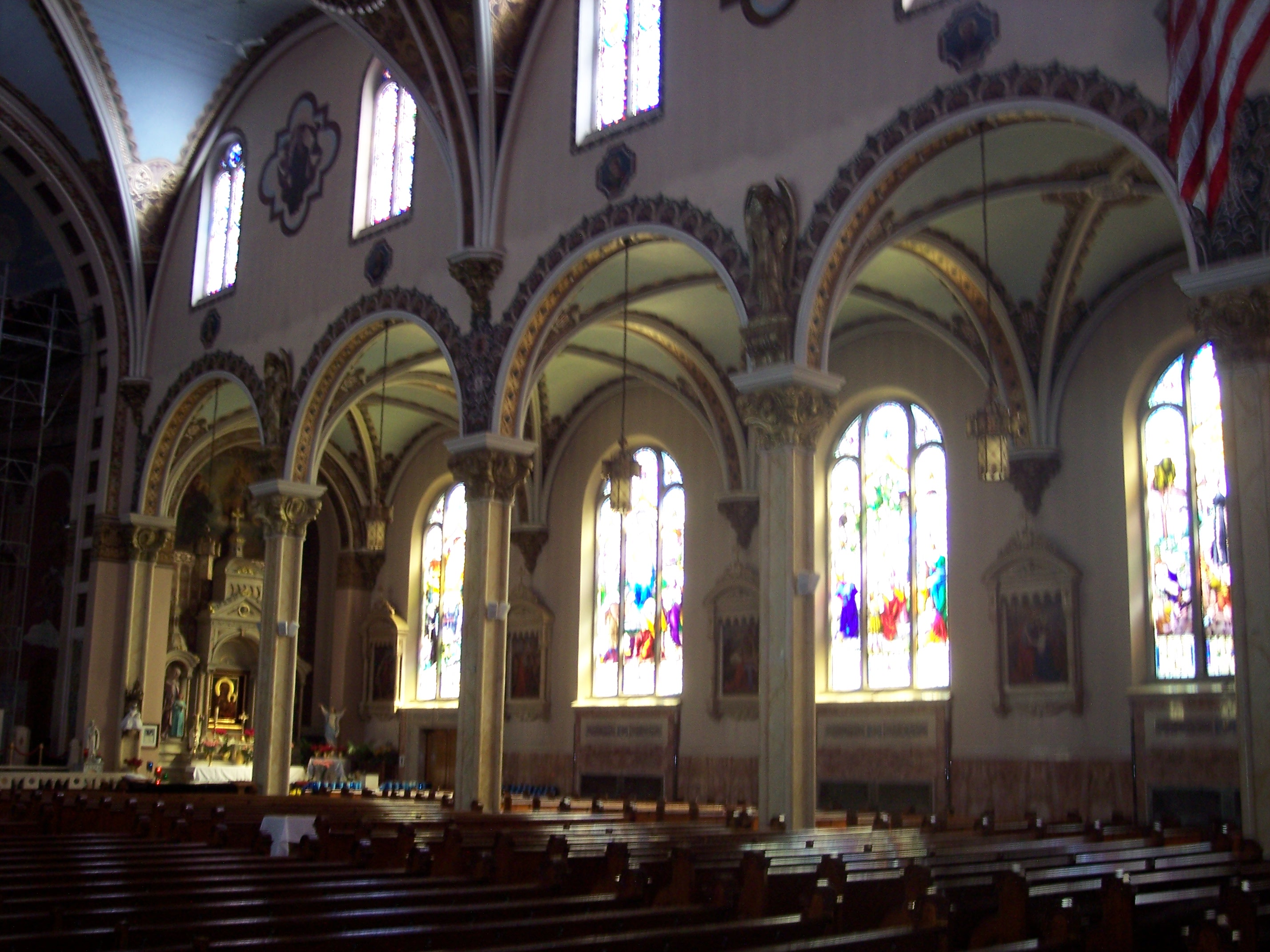
Corpus Christi, Buffalo, interior

In the US, Holy Week observances in a particular area often reflect the traditions of the immigrant population who settled there.

- In Buffalo, New York the pilgrimage is promoted by a local neighborhood preservation group to highlight the cultural heritage of immigrant parishes. In 2014 the group handled over 700 requests for pilgrimage/tour information.
- In New Orleans it is customary to visit nine churches on Good Friday.

== See also ==
- Seven Pilgrim Churches of Rome
