= Altar of repose =

Temporary altar for the eucharist to be used on Good Friday

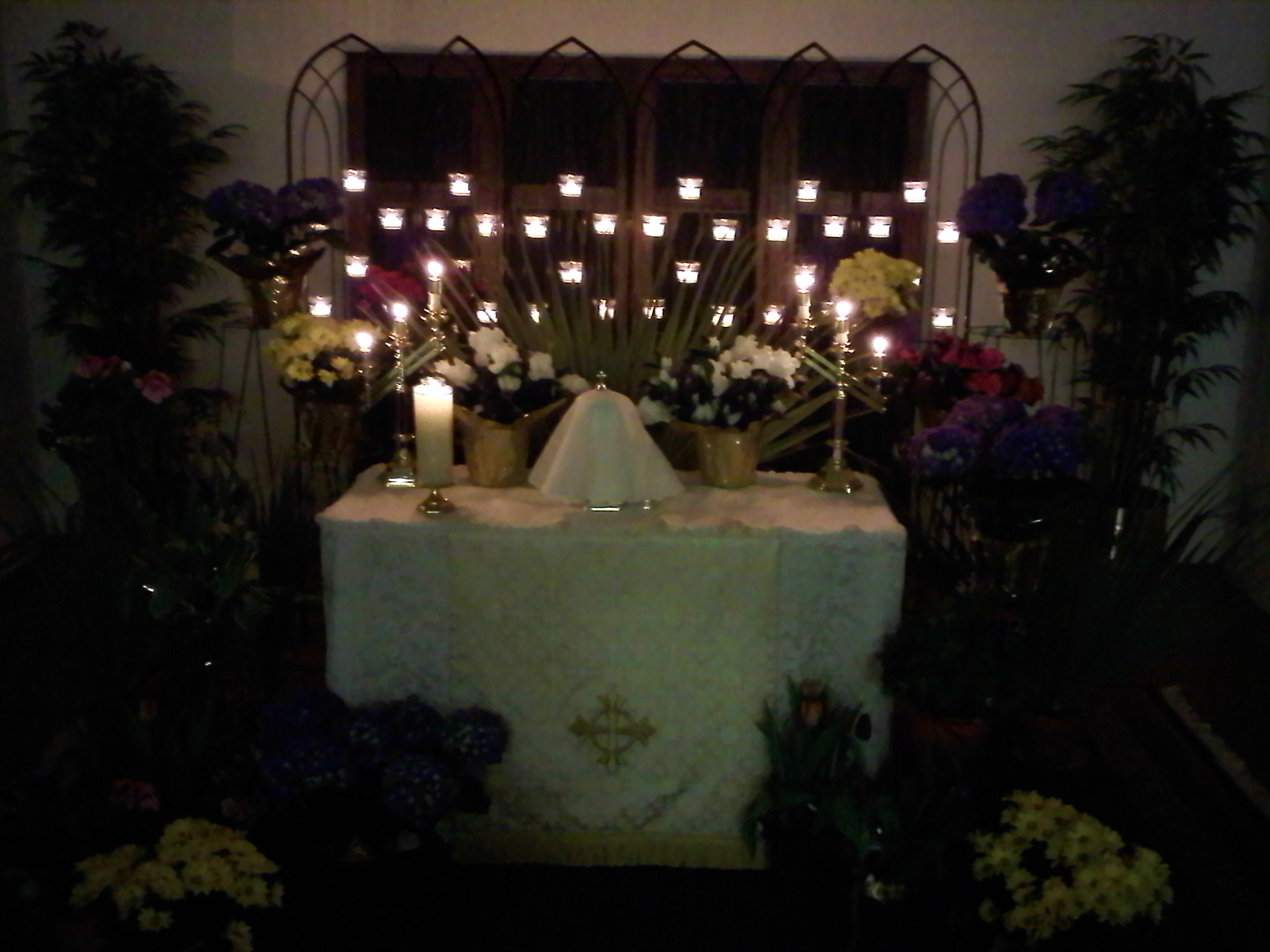
Altar of repose at St James Episcopal Church, Columbus, Ohio where Eucharistic hosts are reserved in a veiled ciborium overnight from Maundy Thursday to Good Friday.

The altar of repose is a temporary altar where the Communion hosts consecrated on Maundy Thursday during the Mass of the Lord's Supper are placed, or "reserved", for use on the following day, Good Friday.

As Good Friday is the day on which the death of Christ is observed, while the Resurrection of Jesus is observed on Easter Sunday and the anticipatory Easter Vigil on Holy Saturday, Mass may not be celebrated between these days, namely, between Good Friday and the evening Easter Vigil Mass on Holy Saturday which is usually celebrated after sundown. Communion hosts thus cannot be consecrated, and any hosts used on Good Friday or for viaticum for the dying must have been consecrated beforehand.

This structure can be found in Roman Catholic, Old Catholic, Anglican (especially Anglo-Catholic), and some Lutheran churches.

== Liturgical use ==
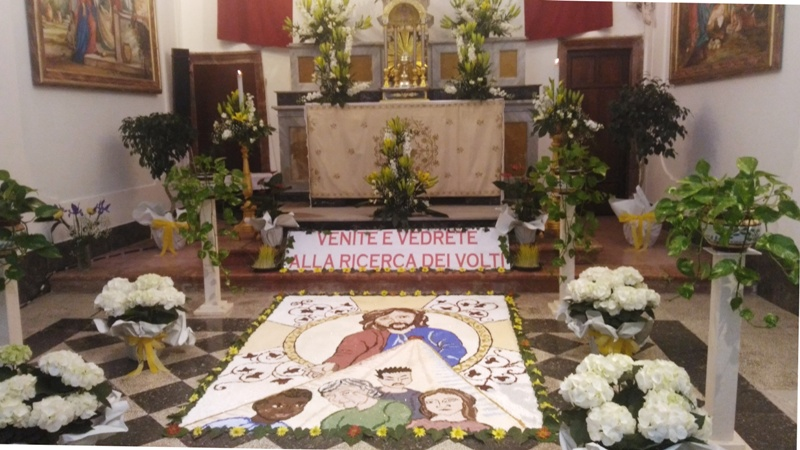
Altar of Repose, Church of Saint Francis of Assisi (Alcamo), 2018

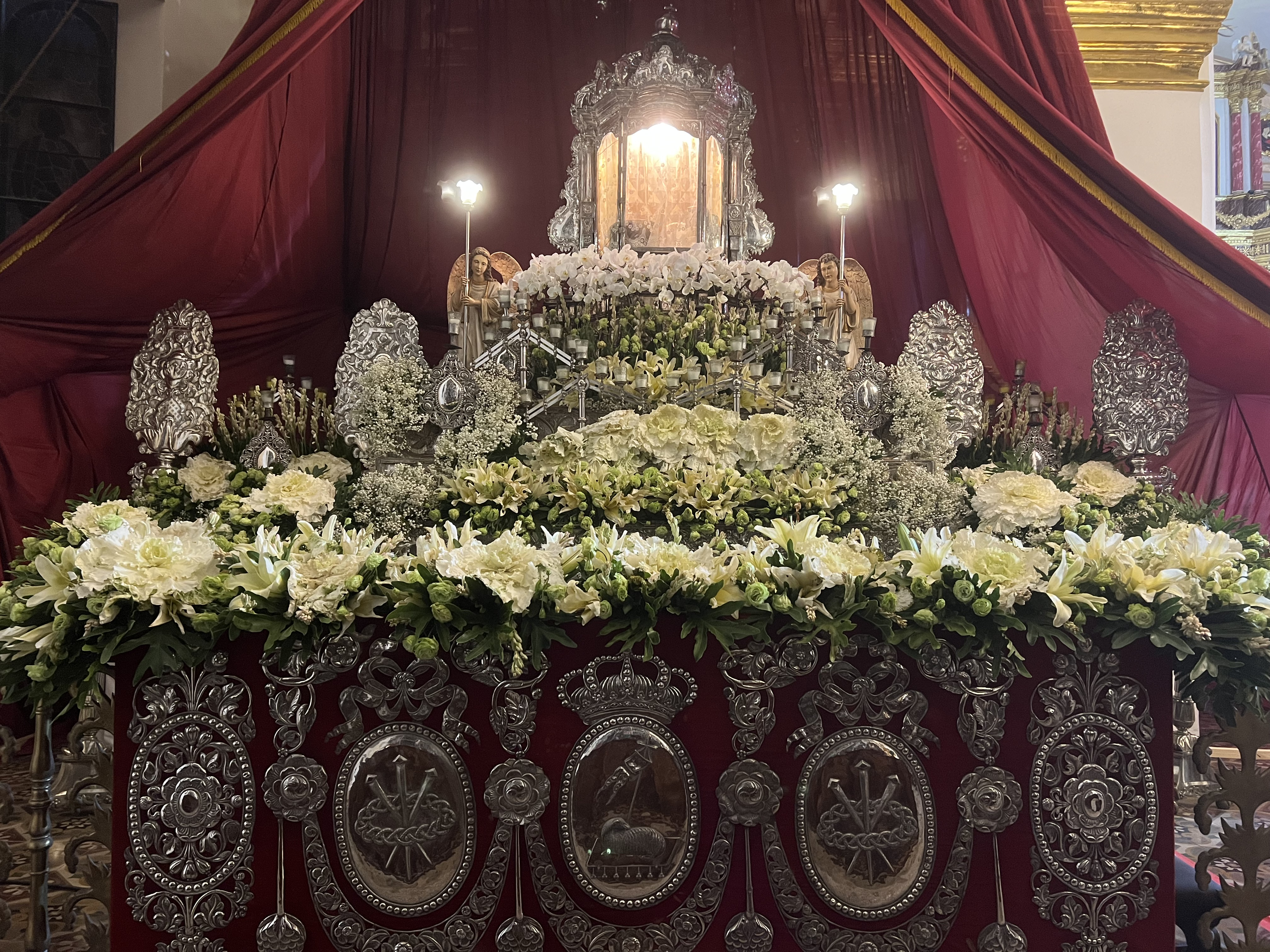
Altar of Repose at the Vigan Cathedral, Philippines, 2026

The Catholic Church does not specify that the place of reservation should be an altar, only that "the Blessed Sacrament should be reserved in a closed tabernacle or pyx". Indeed, the Church's rules on the matter envisage no more than a single altar in the church.

During the Mass of the Lord's Supper, a sufficient number of hosts are consecrated for the faithful to receive Communion both at that Mass and at the Good Friday liturgy on the next day. The hosts intended for the Good Friday service are not placed in the tabernacle, as is usual, but are left on the altar, while the priest says the postcommunion prayer. The container is then carried in solemn procession under a canopy to a place of reservation somewhere in the church, or in an appropriately adorned chapel. The priest uses a humeral veil while carrying them to that place. The procession is led by a cross-bearer accompanied by two servers with lighted candles; other servers with lighted candles follow and a thurifer with incense immediately precedes the priest. At the end of the Holy Thursday service, all altars, except the one used as the altar of repose, are stripped. The Blessed Sacrament remains in that temporary place until Holy Communion on Good Friday.

Catholic piety has made Maundy Thursday a day of exceptional devotion to the Blessed Sacrament, and the place where the Sacrament is reserved is a focus for the love and aspirations of the faithful. Eucharistic adoration is encouraged at the place of reservation, but if continued after midnight should be done without outward solemnity. In many urban areas, the practice has developed among the faithful of traveling from one church to another to pray in front of different churches' altars of repose, a practice called Seven Churches Visitation. In the Philippines, this practice is called Visita Iglesia.

At the Good Friday service (The Celebration of the Passion of the Lord), the Blessed Sacrament is available for Communion. After that service (with the altar of repose being dismantled), it remains available as viaticum for the dying in a less conspicuous location, such as a locked cabinet in the sacristy. While the receptacle remains in such a temporary tabernacle, a lamp or candle is kept continuously burning before it.

Mention of the altar of repose and the procession to it is not found before the close of the fifteenth century. The reservation of the Consecrated Species in the Mass of Holy Thursday, spoken of in earlier liturgical works, was for the distribution of Holy Communion, not for the service on the following day.

== See also ==
- Seven Churches Visitation
