= Humeral veil =

Roman Catholic liturgical vestment

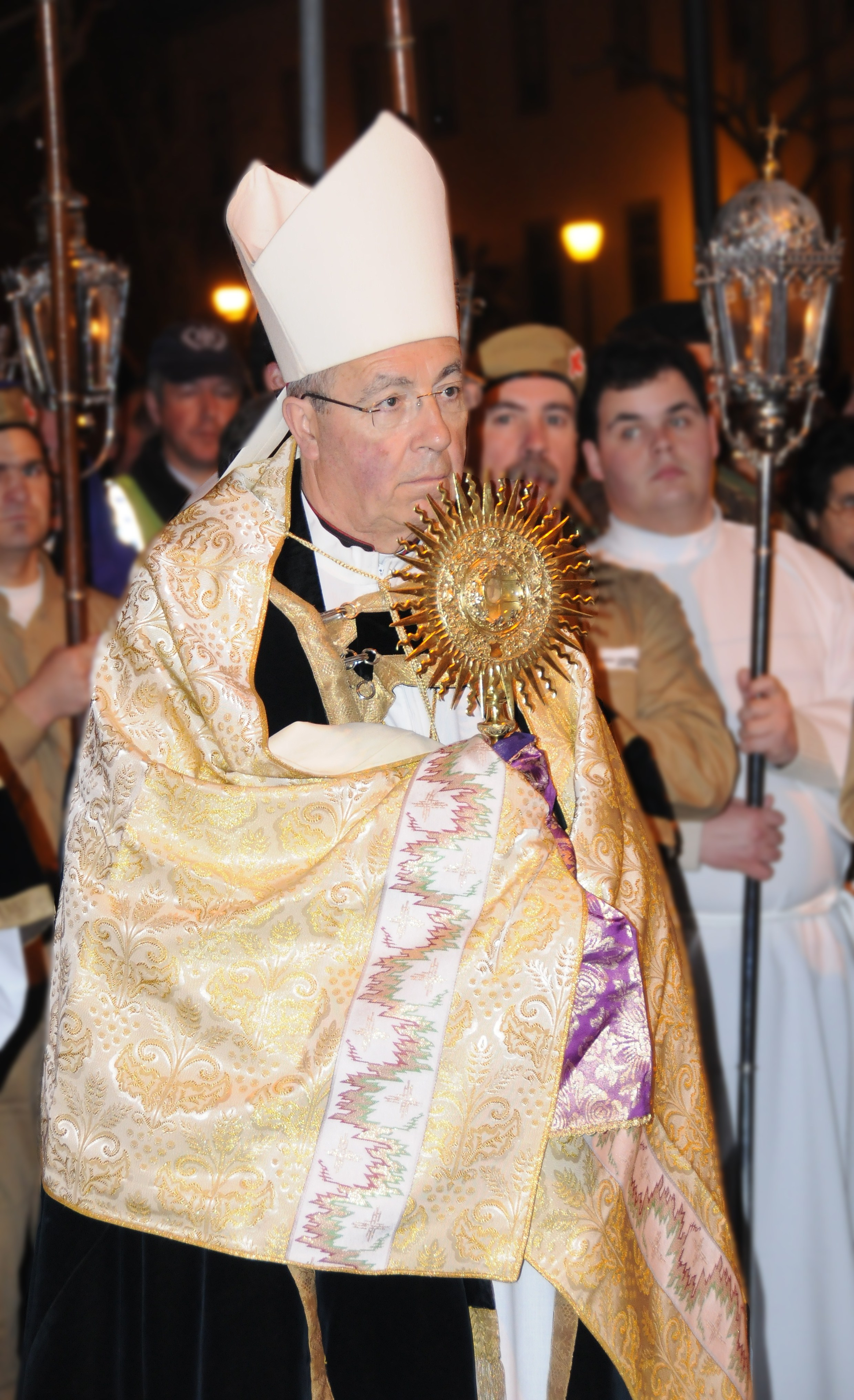
Archbishop of Braga Jorge Ortiga wearing a humeral veil for holding a monstrance during a procession.

The humeral veil is one of the liturgical vestments of the Roman Rite, also used in some Anglican and Lutheran churches. It consists of a piece of cloth about 2.75 metres (108 in) long and 90 centimetres (35 in) wide draped over the shoulders and down the front, normally of silk or cloth of gold. At the ends there are sometimes pockets in the back for hands to go into so that the wearer can hold items without touching them with the hands.

There is no clarity on when the humeral veil first appeared, though it was certainly in use in the continental Tridentine Rite and in other pre-Reformation usages including the Sarum Rite.

The humeral veil is of the liturgical colour of the day on which it is used, or else is white or cloth of gold.

The humeral veil is most often seen during the liturgy of Exposition and Benediction of the Blessed Sacrament. When priests or deacons bless the people with the monstrance, they cover their hands with the ends of the veil so that their hands do not touch the monstrance as a mark of respect for the sacred vessel and as an indication that it is Jesus present in the Eucharistic species who blesses the people and not the minister.

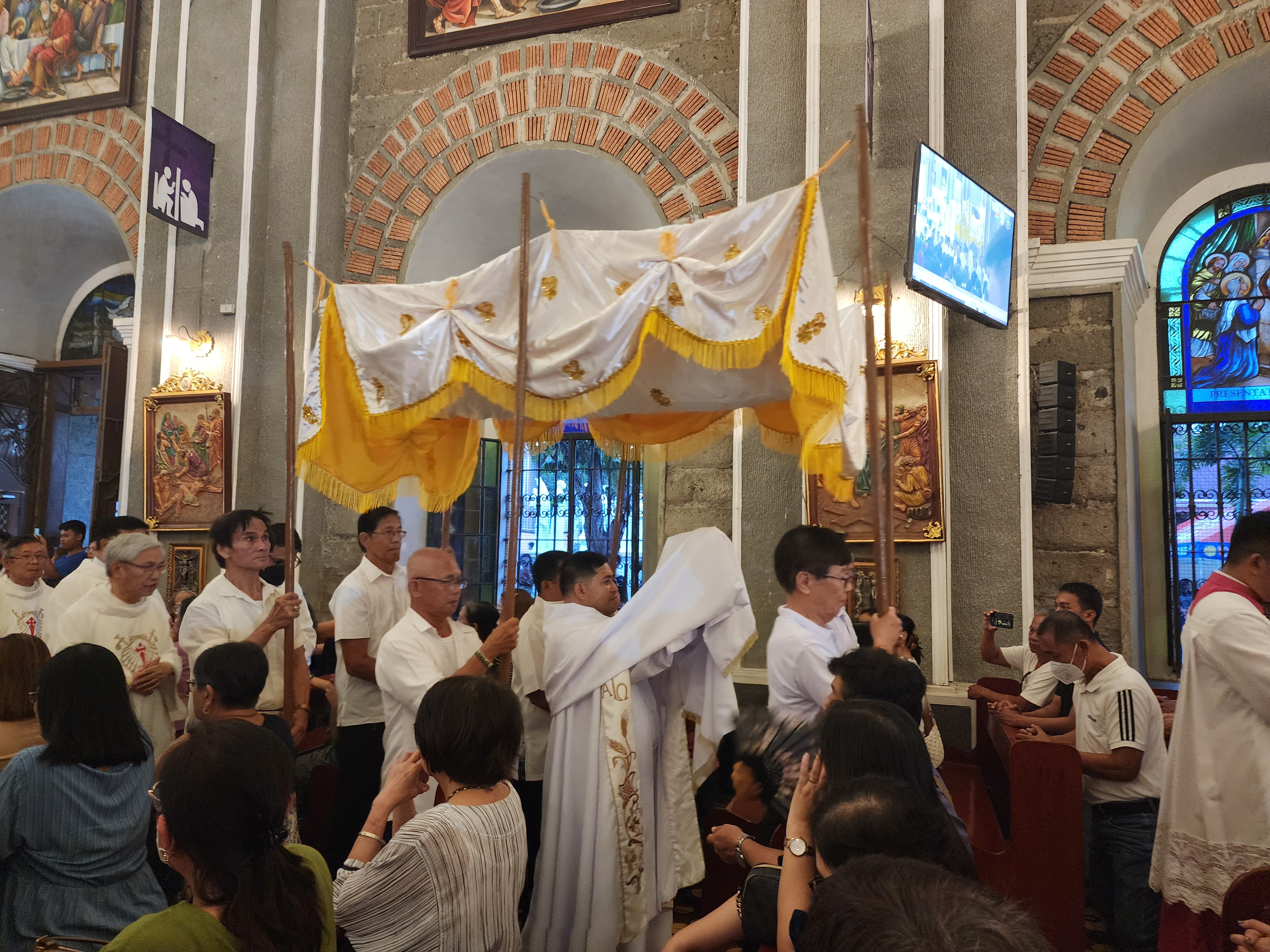
A priest wearing a humeral veil under a processional canopy for the repositioning of the Blessed Sacrament after the Mass of the Lord's Supper.

The humeral veil is also seen at the Mass of the Lord's Supper of the Catholic Church. It is used when the Ciborium containing the Blessed Sacrament is taken in procession to the place of reposition, and again when it is brought back to the altar without solemnity during the Good Friday service. The ritual for Requiem masses does not require the use of a humeral veil. The exception to this is the Dominican Rite which has a number of distinctive liturgical customs.

In the High Mass form of Tridentine Mass, the subdeacon uses a humeral veil when carrying the chalice, paten, or other sacred vessels, which should be touched only by a deacon or another man in major orders.

There are several ways to fold the humeral veil; it can be folded so that each side is folded individually like an accordion (with the folds either on top of the center or underneath the center of the humeral veil), or it can be folded by folding both sides simultaneously in an accordion style (after offsetting one side).

The humeral veil should not be confused with the vimpa, which is of a similar but narrower design. The vimpa is sometimes used when a bishop celebrates Mass. In the Roman Rite, if the bishop uses a mitre and crosier, the altar servers assigned to the task of holding those items cover their hands with the vimpa when holding them, symbolizing that the items do not belong to them. The vimpa may be in the color of the day or alternatively of a simple material in white or green.

In Imperial Roman court ceremonial, a similar veil, or sudarium, was used by attendants approaching the Emperor to cover their hands, presumably in case he handed them something. In art, angels adjacent to Christ often have such a cloth in Late Antique and Early Medieval art.

== See also ==
- Anglican devotions
- Sacramentals
