= Churchwardens' accounts =

Form of ecclesiastical record

Churchwardens' accounts are a form of record maintained by the churchwardens of a parish church where expenses, activities, and events of the parish are recorded. Churchwardens' accounts are sometimes found in association with the parish register, which records ritual matters. These records have been extensively utilized to study European history, particularly during the medieval period and the English Reformation. England has the highest proportion of surviving churchwardens' accounts.

== Description ==
The churchwarden, the oldest officer position within Christian parish churches, was generally elected by an urban congregation once a year at Easter. According to historian Beat Kümin, a churchwarden's role was analogous to that of a chief executive officer, with lay congregants comprising the parish's "shareholders" and the masters or feoffees comprising the parish's "board". Among their duties were managing the parish's accounts. The accounts recorded both the expenses and income of the parish, often indicating which parishioners were renting from the parish. Churchwardens were also responsible for annually certifying the accuracy of parish registers before they were submitted to the bishop. Churchwardens' accounts are sometimes found in association with parish registers.

Churchwardens' accounts appear in medieval and post-Reformation Europe, including both Catholic and Church of England parishes. On the British Isles, churchwardens' accounts are most prevalent in England, followed by Wales and Ireland, but are not readily found from Scotland. Overall, England has the highest proportion of churchwardens' accounts. The University of York's Borthwick Institute for Archives collection of accounts date from the late 14th century through to the 1980s. The 17th century produced an increasing number now held in that collection, with the majority coming from the 18th and 19th centuries. While some English accounts were made in Latin into the 18th century, the majority were written in the vernacular.

== Historical significance ==
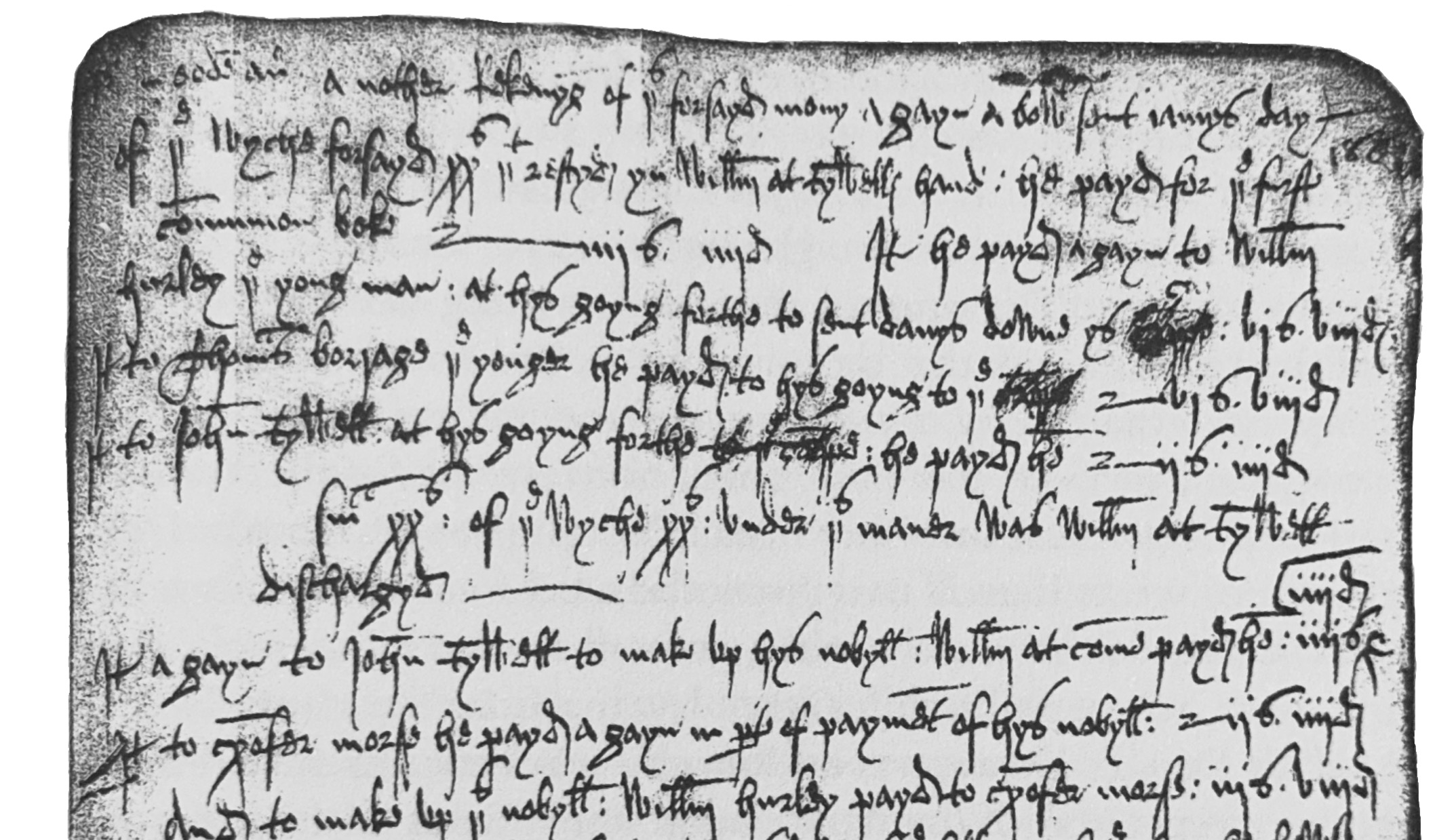
Trychay's churchwarden's account showing his parish's support for the 1549 Prayer Book Rebellion

The role of churchwardens' accounts in the study of life within particular parishes has been significant. In the context of English history near the beginning of the 16th century, Kümin described them as "promis[ing] unrivalled insights into the public lives of the vast majority of the population", as the one thing most Englishmen had in common at the time was that "they were parishioners". Historian Clive Burgess criticised the usage of churchwardens' accounts, saying that historians with agendas engaged in uncritical acceptance of churchwardens' accounts and that the role of the churchwarden within parochial governance had become overstated. The value of churchwardens' accounts to genealogists is diminished relative to other parish records as the accounts were rarely indexed.

In England, the historical value of churchwardens' accounts has seen efforts to establish a database collecting them to improve accessibility and encourage their utilization. In 2012, researchers at the Warwick Network for Parish Research's annual conference called for the establishment of such a database.

Reprinted editions of churchwardens' accounts have been produced. Churchwardens' accounts have been used extensively by historian Eamon Duffy in his books The Stripping of the Altars (1992) and The Voices of Morebath. In the case of The Voices of Morebath, Duffy extensively relied upon the 16th-century accounts of Sir Christopher Trychay, the vicar of Morebath's parish, which had been reprinted. Patrick Collinson criticised the "misleading, if conventional", characterisation of Trychay's records as "churchwarden's accounts", as they were a broader set of records beyond those generally maintained by churchwardens.
