= Christopher Trychay =

English priest (died 1574)

Sir Christopher Trychay
- Pronunciation: Trickee
- Died: 1574
- Occupation: Vicar
- Known for: Churchwardens' accounts

Ecclesiastical career
- Religion: Christianity
- Church: Catholic Church; Church of England
- Congregations: Morebath (1520–1574) Knowstone (1560–)

Signature
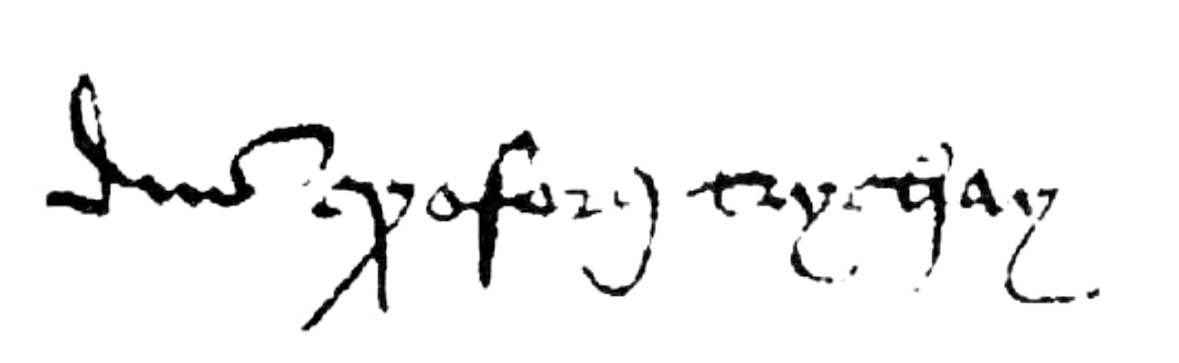

Sir Christopher Trychay (Note: Catholic priests were referred to with the formal title of Sir, rather than the modern title of Father that was popularized in the late 19th century. Trychay is pronounced /trɪki/ TRICK-ee.) (died 1574) was an English priest who served as the vicar of St George's Church, Morebath from 1520 until his death in 1574. While at Morebath, Trychay maintained detailed churchwardens' accounts that described the parish's transition from a medieval Catholic congregation into a Protestant Church of England one. These accounts have survived, being reprinted and utilized in two award-winning books by the historian Eamon Duffy.

Trychay's accounts survive in the Exeter Library. They were edited and reprinted by a later vicar of Morebath, J. Erskine Binney, in 1904. Duffy utilized Trychay's accounts in two books: the 1992 The Stripping of the Altars and the 2001 The Voices of Morebath. Trychay's records have been credited with enhancing the modern understanding of the period of religious and political upheaval he experienced.

== Biography ==
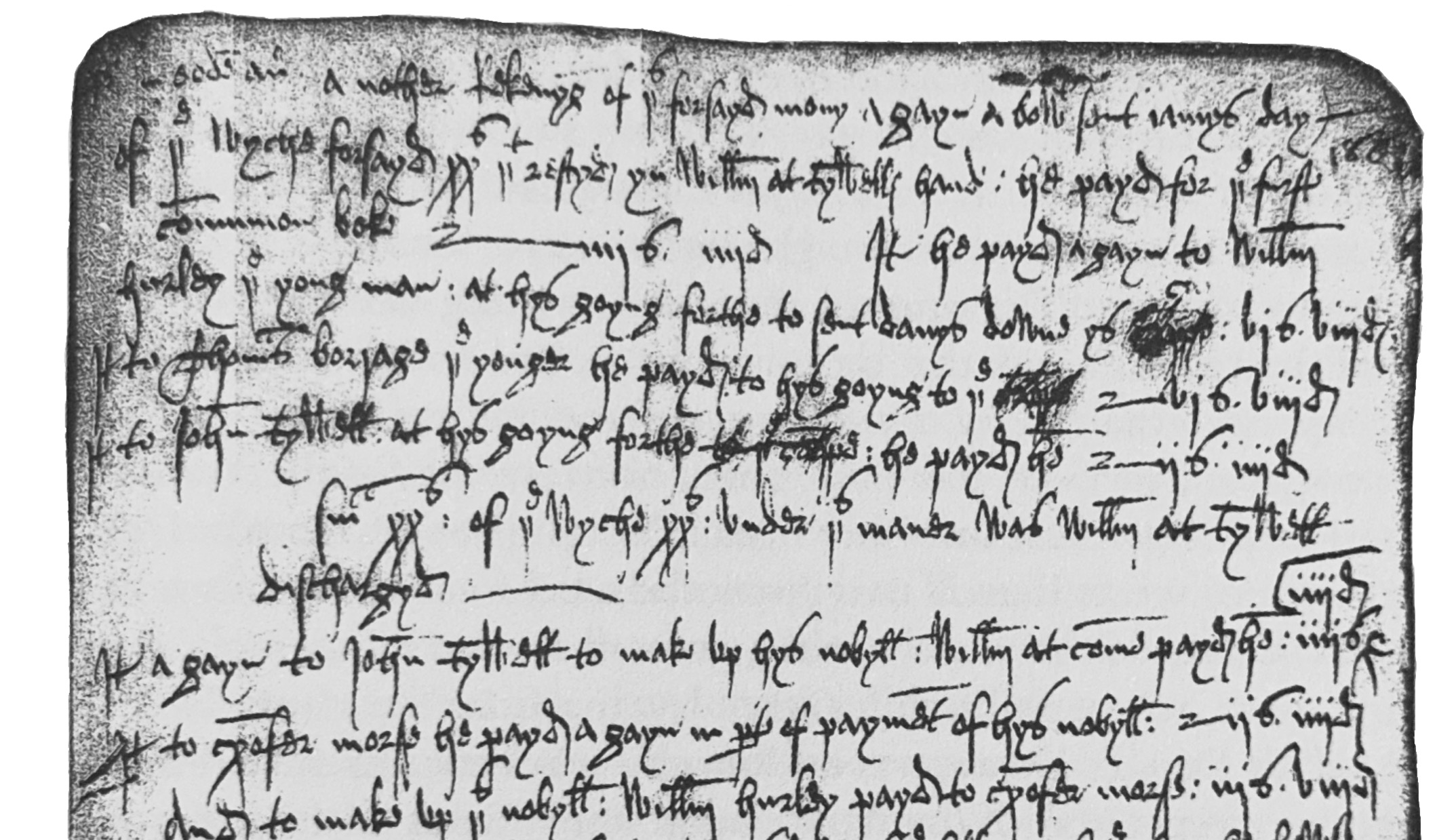
Trychay's churchwarden's account showing his parish's support for the 1549 Prayer Book Rebellion

After being ordained a Catholic priest, Trychay was assigned in 1520 as vicar of St George's Church, Morebath. Trychay remained at Morebath until his death in 1574. Through the duration of his time as vicar, he maintained meticulous churchwardens' accounts that detail parish life.

During his early ministry, Trychay was like many medieval Catholic priests. Trychay spent 20 years introducing the cult of Saint Sidwell to Morebath, but then he and the parish obeyed orders to enforce the English Reformation's rejection of such practices. While Trychay and his congregation generally accepted applying government policies on religion – spanning from Henry VIII's split from Rome through Mary I's restoration of Catholicism to Elizabeth I's Protestant religious settlement – his accounts record that he and the parish sent five men in support of the failed Prayer Book Rebellion in 1549. Trychay showed further resistance to implementing the Reformation in initially refraining from disposing of recently acquired vestments when they were prohibited under Edward VI. He welcomed the brief reversion to Catholicism under Mary I.

== Legacy ==
Trychay's churchwardens' accounts are among the few surviving records of Morebath in the 16th century, as most other records were destroyed during the Exeter Blitz of World War II. Religious history scholars view Trychay's records as beneficial in understanding the period of religious and political upheaval that he lived through.

J. Erskine Binney, a late Victorian-era vicar of Morbath, compiled and reprinted Trychay's churchwardens' accounts in 1904. (Note: Another clergyman, F. W. Weaver, contributed a glossarial index to Binney's edition.) While Binney had sorted the original manuscript records, they were later dropped and then randomly rebound at Exeter Library. The Irish historian of British religion Eamon Duffy utilized Binney's edition and the original manuscript in compiling The Voices of Morebath. Duffy had first encountered Trychay's churchwardens' accounts while performing research for what became his 1992 book, The Stripping of the Altars. The Stripping of the Altars won the Longman-History Today Book of the Year Award. The Voices of Morebath won the Hawthornden Prize for Literature.
