= Huntsham =

Village in Devon, England

Coordinates: 50.974800°N 3.418985°W

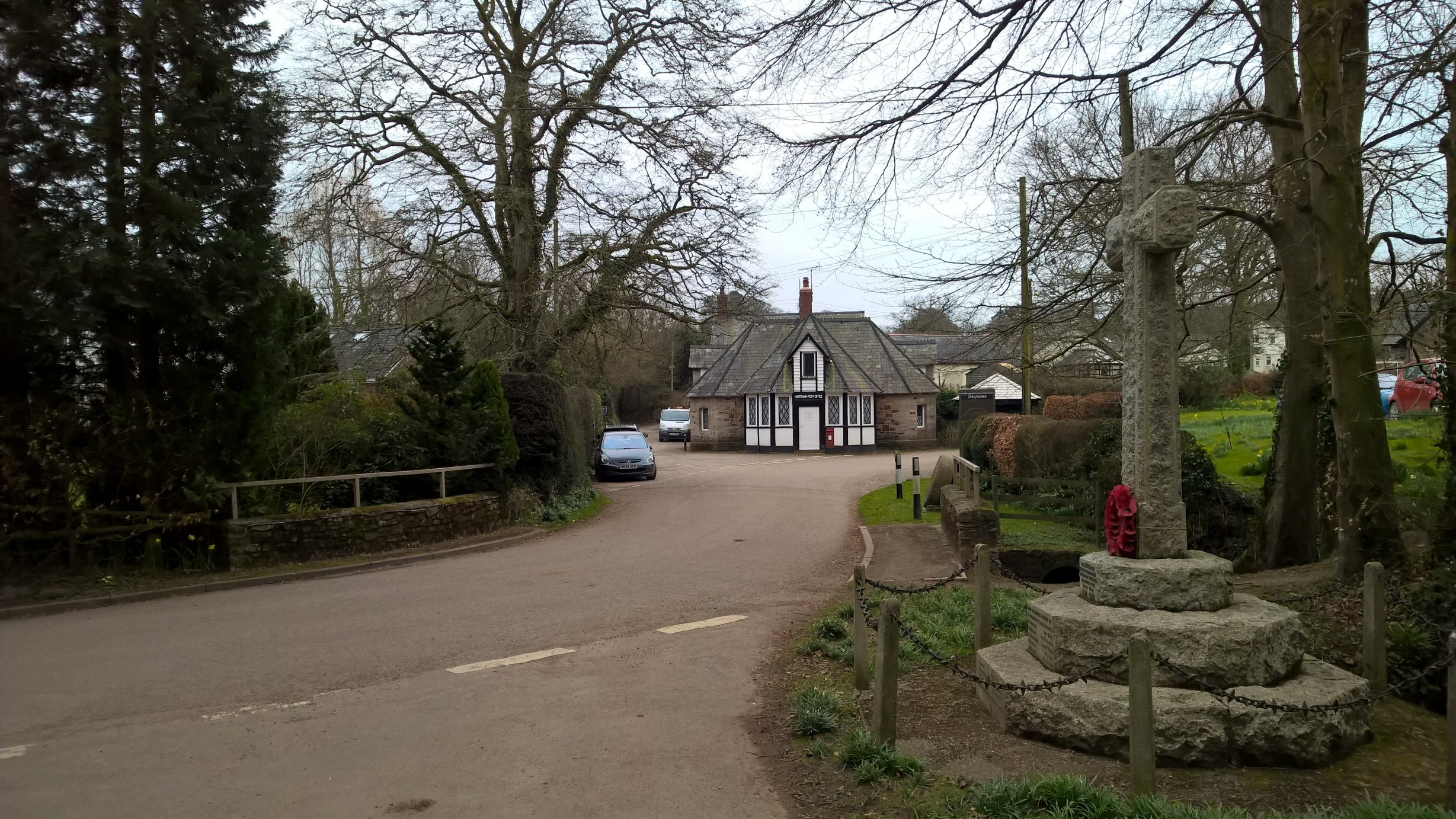
- The war memorial and old post office in the centre of the village

- Location within Devon
- Population: 138 (2001 UK Census)
- OS grid reference: ST0047220446
- District: Mid Devon
- Shire county: Devon
- Region: South West
- Country: England
- Sovereign state: United Kingdom
- Post town: TIVERTON
- Postcode district: EX16
- Dialling code: 01398
- Police: Devon and Cornwall
- Fire: Devon and Somerset
- Ambulance: South Western
- UK Parliament: Tiverton and Minehead

Huntsham is a small village and civil parish, formerly a manor and ecclesiastical parish, in the Mid Devon district of Devon, England. The nearest town is Tiverton, about 5.8 miles (9.3 km) south-west of the village. The parish is surrounded clockwise from the north by the parishes of Bampton, Hockworthy, Uplowman and Tiverton; it is bounded on the east by the River Lowman and by a minor road on Bampton Down to the north west, where it reaches a maximum height of 914 feet (279 m). In 2001 the population of the parish was 138, down from 222 in 1901.

Huntsham is part of the Diocese of Exeter, and is served by All Saints' Church, which was restored by Benjamin Ferrey. Near to the church is the former manor house, Huntsham Court, which was built by Ferrey in 1868–70 and is now a Grade II* listed building. Many of the buildings in Huntsham village were built to service the house at the turn of the 20th century.

== History ==
The Iron Age fort known as Huntsham Castle is situated on the southern border of the parish.

According to the Domesday Book, Huntsham was held by the Saxon priest Alric before the Norman Conquest of 1066, and afterwards it was held in demesne as one of the 24 holdings of Odo Son of Gamelin. According to the antiquarian William Pole, by 1242 it was held by the de Stanton family, and in 1307 by Peter de Dunsland.

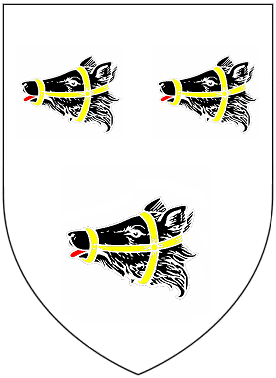
Canting arms of Bere family of Huntsham and Morebath: Argent, three bear's heads erased sable muzzled or

Pole further stated that in 1309 Robert Beare was the owner, from whom the descent of the manor has been traced through that family, to Thomas Bere (1652–1725) who was twice MP for Tiverton. He purchased from the Wallop family the nearby manor of Morebath where his half-brother, Richard Bere (1659–1724), established his own family in about 1688. On the extinction of the descendants of Thomas, Richard's branch soon became the senior line of the Bere family.

Having been abandoned by the Bere family in favour of Morebath, Huntsham was purchased firstly by the Lucas family, and then by the Troyte family, of which William Troyte was the owner in 1801, and Thomas Troyte in 1810.

After the death of Thomas in 1812, the manor was inherited by his younger brother the Rev. Edward Berkeley Troyte (1763–1852), DCL, Rector of Huntsham, who was more interested in the sporting life – cock fighting and fox hunting – than in managing his estates. As a consequence, on his death the Tudor manor house and the adjacent parish church were both in a poor state of repair. By his will he bequeathed his estates to Arthur Henry Dyke Acland (1811–1857), second son of Sir Thomas Dyke Acland, 10th Baronet, who in accordance with the terms of the bequest assumed by royal licence the name and arms of Troyte. In 1854 Arthur (now Arthur Henry Dyke Acland Troyte) engaged Benjamin Ferrey to restore the parish church. On his death in 1857 the manor passed to his eldest son Charles Arthur Williams Troyte (1842–1896) who, following his marriage in 1864, demolished the old manor house and built the present country house, Huntsham Court, to Ferrey's design. After Charles's death the manor passed to his second son Hugh Leonard Acland-Troyte (1870–1918), who was killed in the First World War, then to Charles's third son, Sir Gilbert Acland-Troyte (1876–1964) who dying childless left the estate to his nephew John Acland-Troyte (1914–1988) who died without heir and thus ended the families connection to Huntsham.

== Sources ==
- Pole, Sir William (d.1635), Collections Towards a Description of the County of Devon, Sir John-William de la Pole (ed.), London, 1791
- Vivian, Lt.Col. J.L., (Ed.) The Visitations of the County of Devon: Comprising the Heralds' Visitations of 1531, 1564 & 1620, Exeter, 1895
