= Stripping of the Altar =

Religious ceremony

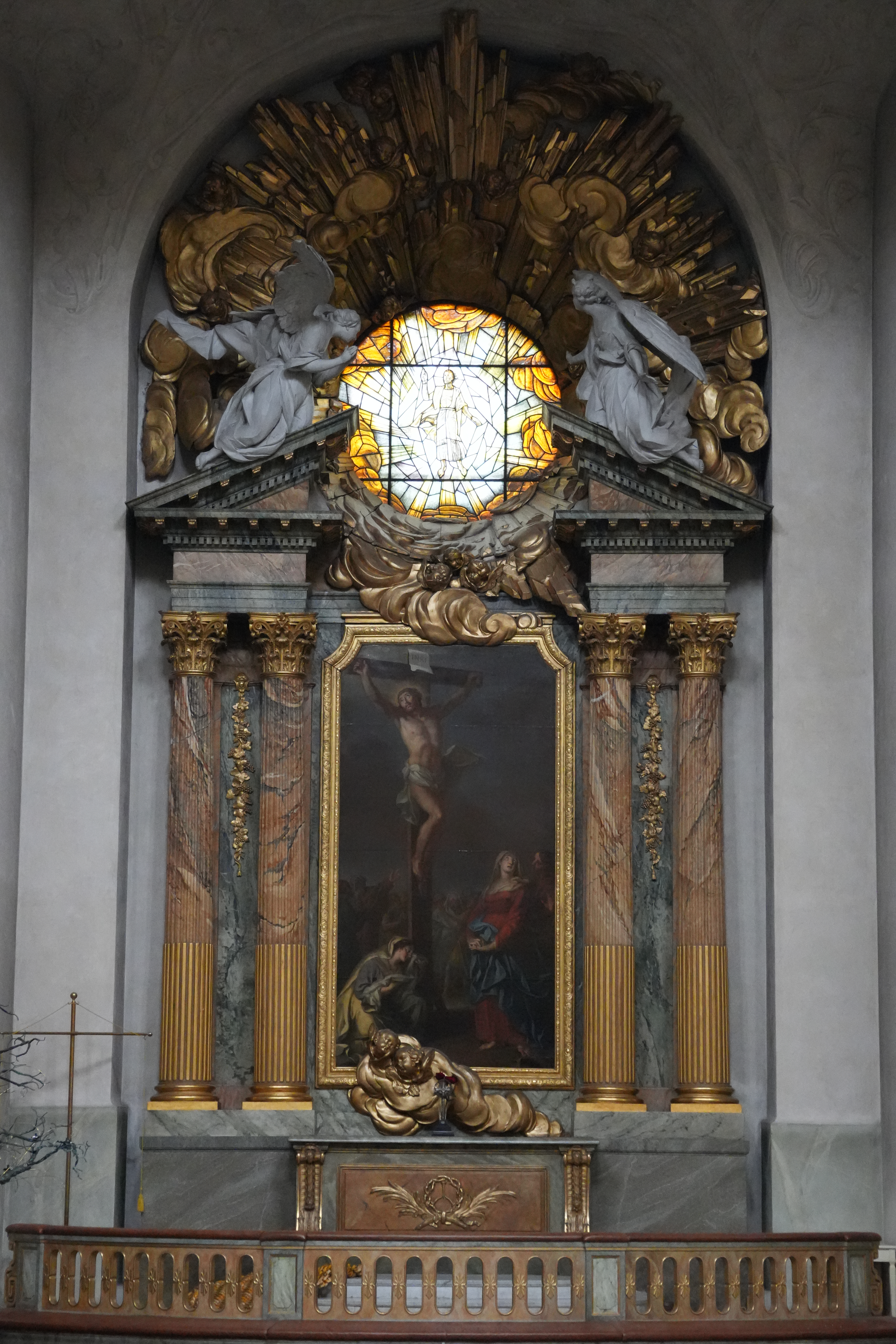
The stripped altar of Hedvig Eleonora Evangelical-Lutheran Church on Good Friday in Östermalm, Sweden (after it was stripped following the Mass of the Lord's Supper on Maundy Thursday). The lamps of the church have been dimmed in congruence with the somber nature of Good Friday.

The Stripping of the Altar or the Stripping of the Chancel is a ceremony carried out in many Catholic, Lutheran, Methodist, and Anglican churches on Maundy Thursday.

In addition to the stripping of the altar at the conclusion of the Maundy Thursday liturgy in the Evangelical-Lutheran churches, the "lectern and pulpit are [also] left bare until Easter to symbolize the humiliation and barrenness of the cross."

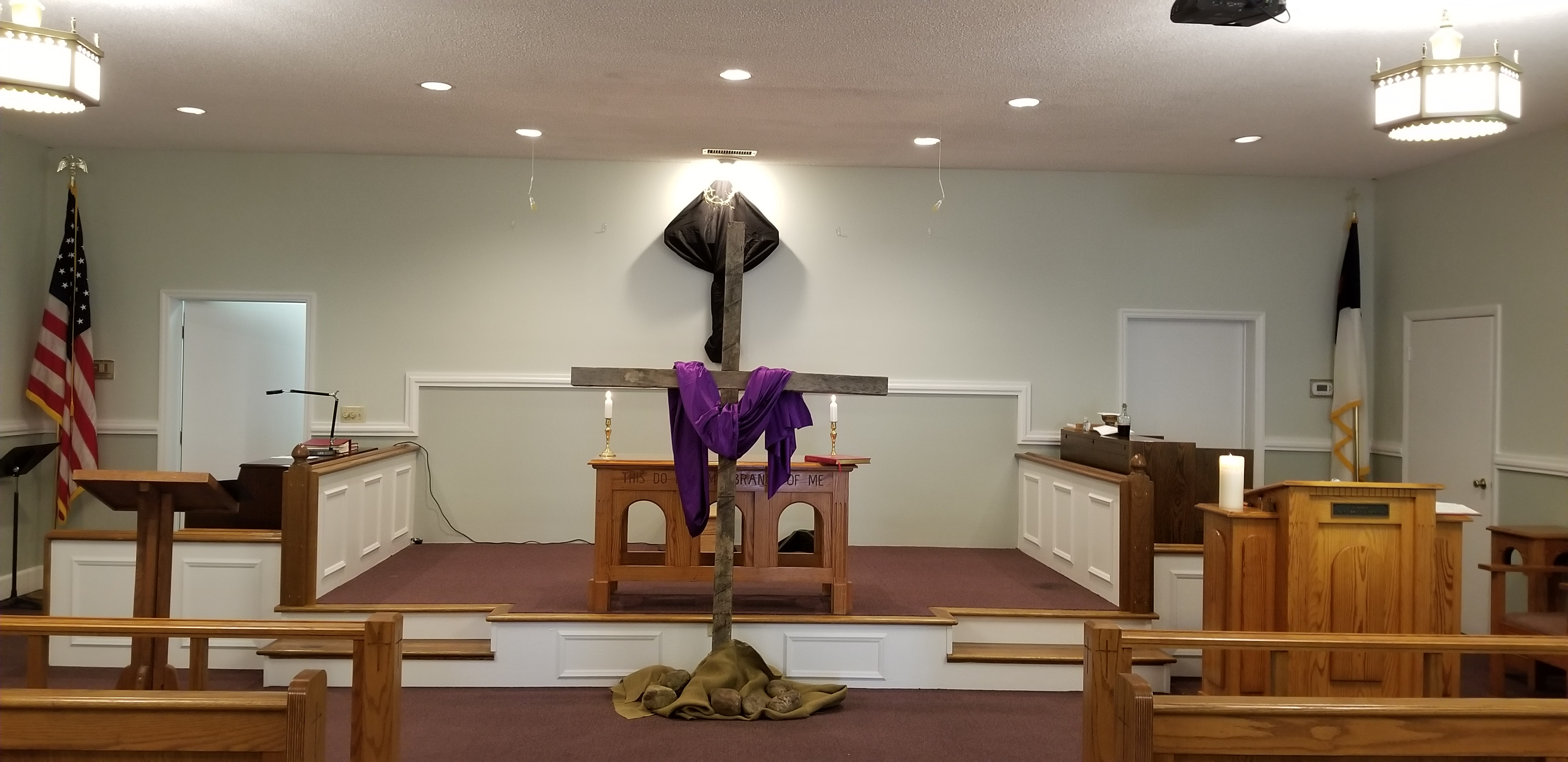
On Maundy Thursday, the altar of this Methodist church was stripped and the cross of this Methodist church was veiled in black for Good Friday (black is the liturgical colour for Good Friday in Methodism). A wooden cross sits in front of the bare chancel for the veneration of the cross ceremony, which may occur during the Good Friday liturgy.

In Anglican churches, this ceremony is also performed at the conclusion of Maundy Thursday services, "in which all appointments, linens, and paraments are removed from the altar and chancel in preparation for Good Friday."

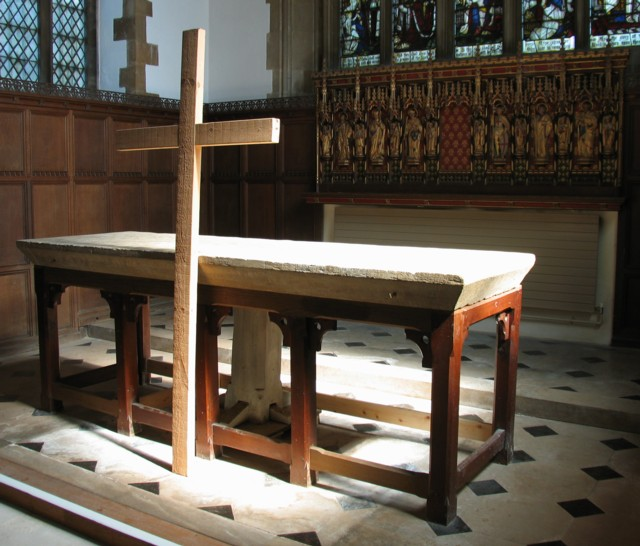
A stripped altar in an Anglican church on Good Friday

In the earlier form of the Roman Rite, the stripping of the altar was done at the end of Mass of the Lord's Supper on Maundy Thursday. It is still carried out. All altars in the church, except for the altar of repose, are stripped. In the present form of the Roman Rite, as revised in 1955, there is no ceremony of stripping the altar. At a suitable time after the Mass the altar is stripped, usually by the sacristan, and crosses are removed from the church, if possible. There is no Mass on Good Friday or Holy Saturday, the next one being that of the Easter Vigil. On Good Friday, a white cloth is placed on the altar for the last part of the Celebration of the Passion of the Lord, after the conclusion of which the altar is stripped, again privately, except that the cross remains on the altar with two or four candlesticks.

At the end of the Maundy Thursday liturgy in Methodist parishes, the chancel is traditionally stripped; black paraments are sometimes added for Good Friday as black is the liturgical colour of Good Friday in the Methodist churches. Methodist custom holds that apart from depictions of the Stations of the Cross, other images (such as the altar cross) continue the Lenten habitude of being veiled.

The form of the Roman Rite in use immediately before the reform of the Easter Triduum ceremonies by Pope Pius XII in 1955 had a formal ceremony of stripping the altar as a conclusion of the Holy Thursday Mass, which was then celebrated in the morning. After removing the ciborium from the high altar to the altar of repose, the priest, accompanied by the other ministers, went to the sacristy, where he took off his white Mass vestments and donned a violet stole. Then, with the other ministers, he removed the altarcloths, vases of flowers, antependium and all other ornaments then customarily placed on the altar. Unlike present usage, the altar cross and candlesticks were left on the altar. This was done to the accompaniment of Psalm 22 (Vulgate) (Deus, Deus meus) preceded and followed by the antiphon "Diviserunt sibi vestimenta mea: et super vestem meam miserunt sortem" ("They divided my clothes among them and cast lots for my garment").

In earlier centuries, the altars were in some churches washed with a bunch of hyssop dipped in wine and water. Augustine Joseph Schulte says that this was done "to render them in some manner worthy of the Lamb without stain who is immolated on them, and to recall to the minds of the faithful with how great purity they should assist at the Holy Sacrifice and receive Holy Communion." He adds that the ceremony was intended as homage offered to Jesus in return for his humbly washing the feet of his disciples, the ceremonial commemoration of which was, before 1955, carried out separately from the Mass and stripping of the altar.

Eamonn Duffy alludes to this ceremony in the title of his book The Stripping of the Altars: Traditional Religion in England, 1400–1580, a history of Christian religious practice in England before and during the Reformation.

== See also ==
- Seven Churches Visitation
