= The Voices of Morebath =

2001 non-fiction book by Eamon Duffy

The Voices of Morebath: Reformation and Rebellion in an English Village
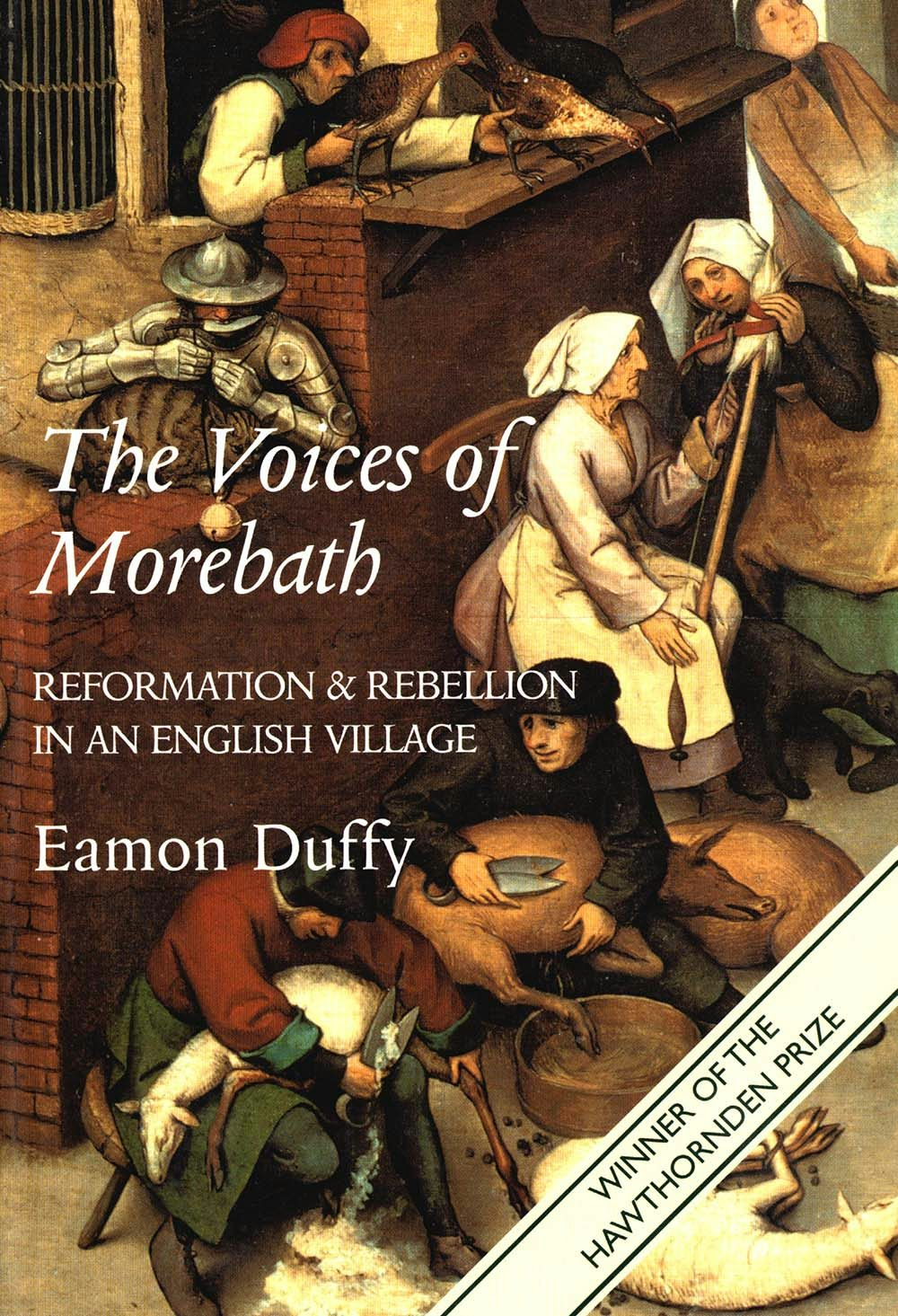
- Cover of 2003 edition
- Author: Eamon Duffy
- Language: English
- Subject: English Reformation, Morebath, Prayer Book Rebellion
- Publisher: Yale University Press
- Publication date: 2001
- Publication place: United States
- Media type: Print (hardback, paperback)
- Pages: xvi + 232
- ISBN: 9780300091854

The Voices of Morebath: Reformation and Rebellion in an English Village is a 2001 non-fiction history book by the Irish historian of British Christianity Eamon Duffy and published by Yale University Press about the village of Morebath, England, during the English Reformation of the 16th century. Using the detailed churchwarden's accounts maintained by Sir Christopher Trychay, the vicar of Morebath's parish, Duffy recounts the religious and social implications of the Reformation in a small conservative Catholic community through the reign of Henry VIII, during the violent 1549 Prayer Book Rebellion, and into the Elizabethan era. Trychay's accounts – first reprinted in 1904 – had been used in other scholarly works and were first encountered by Duffy during research for his 1992 The Stripping of the Altars on pre-Reformation English religion. The Voices of Morebath depicts both Morebath and Trychay through their strong early resistance to the Reformation to their eventual adoption of new religious norms under the Protestant Elizabethan Religious Settlement.

The Voices of Morebath was praised for its coverage of ecclesiastical and secular parochial matters, particularly its personal treatment of Trychay. It drew criticism for instances where examples from Morebath are used to comment on broader subjects. Other reviewers commented that Duffy conceded the limitations of a local source. Though popular, some reviewers appraised the book as overly complex for the broad audience toward which it had been written and marketed. In 2002, The Voices of Morebath won Duffy the Hawthornden Prize, and the book was shortlisted for both the Samuel Johnson Prize and British Academy Book Prize.

== Background ==
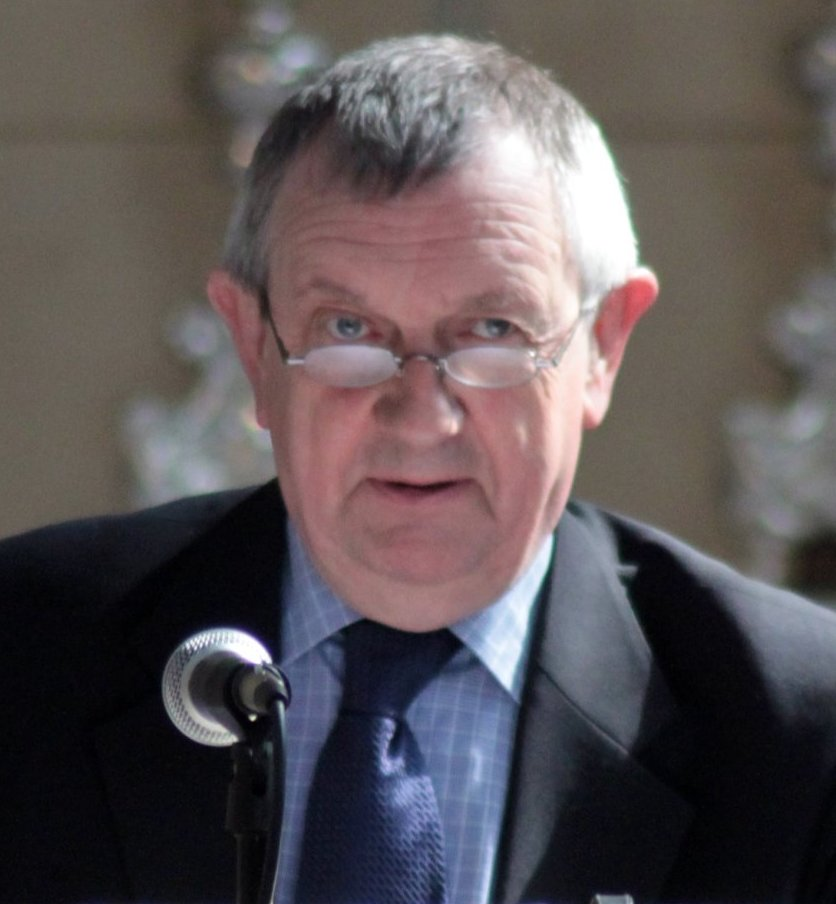
Eamon Duffy in 2010

In the 16th century, Morebath was a village of shepherds in Devon, England, with an isolated and impoverished parish that served roughly 150 people in 33 families. Sir Christopher Trychay (Note: Duffy wrote that during the period of English Reformation, Catholic priests were referred to with the formal title of Sir, rather than the modern title of Father that was popularized in the late 19th century. Trychay is pronounced /trɪki/ TRICK-ee.) was vicar of Morebath for 54 years, from 1520 to 1574. During this vicariate, England had four monarchs and Morebath transitioned from a conservative Catholic community rebelling against the government-imposed English Reformation into a village conforming to the Protestant Elizabethan Religious Settlement. Religion played a significant role in the daily lives of Morebath's residents, though they conformed their practices to the oscillating theologies imposed under the monarchies of Henry VIII (r. 1509–1547), Edward VI (r. 1547–1553), Mary I (r. 1553–1558), and Elizabeth I (r. 1558–1603). The strain of the Edwardian government's religious and financial demands proved the most trying: with the implementation of the 1549 Book of Common Prayer, the counties of Devon and Cornwall revolted, and Morebath's parish sponsored five of its men to join the doomed Prayer Book Rebellion at the nearby city of Exeter.

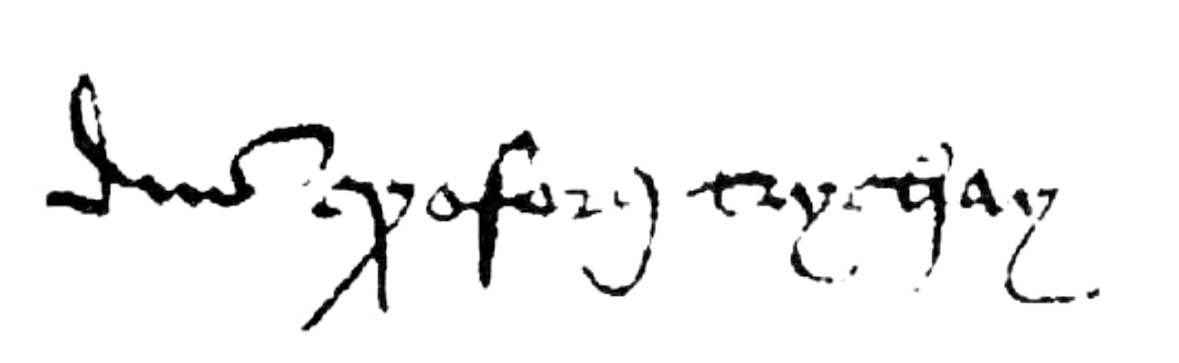
Sir Christopher Trychay's signature from the parish accounts

Trychay maintained meticulous parish accounts during his vicarage at Morebath. These records have been utilized by scholars researching 16th-century England since a version of them was first published in J. Erskine Binney's 1904 The Accounts of the Wardens of the Parish of Morebath, Devon, 1520–1573. Binney was an antiquarian who, like Trychay, had been vicar of St George's Church in Morebath. The 1904 edition was edited on behalf of a local record society. While Binney had sorted the original manuscript records, they were later dropped and then randomly rebound at Exeter Library. Trychay's accounts are among the few surviving 16th-century accounts of Morebath's parish, as many of its archived records were destroyed in bombing raids on Exeter during the Second World War. Eamon Duffy, an Irish Catholic historian of British Christianity, utilized both Binney's edition and the original manuscript in compiling The Voices of Morebath.

Scholarship published before The Voices of Morebath had been split on the popularity of the Reformation among the Tudor English population. The historian A. G. Dickens argued that Protestantism was quickly and voluntarily accepted across England in his 1964 The English Reformation. Initially well received by reviewers, Dickens's thesis saw revisionist challenges by other scholars. The Catholic historian Jack Scarisbrick, in his 1984 The Reformation and the English People, held that the 16th-century English were generally unwilling to surrender their Catholicism. Using Dickens's approach of examining local records, Margaret Bowker's 1981 The Henrician Reformation and Susan Brigden's 1989 London and the Reformation contradicted Dickens and held that Protestantism made inroads slowly among the English.

Trychay's records were first encountered by Duffy during research for his 1992 book The Stripping of the Altars. (Note: In 2017, Duffy recalled that he had discovered Morebath's parish during his 1990s countryside trips after he passed his driving test.) Called "magisterial" by the historians of the Tudor period Robert M. Kingdon and Robert Tittler, this work described the religious practices that permeated all elements of pre-Reformation English society. Duffy's scholarship contended that the Reformation was "a violent disruption, not the natural fulfilment, of most of what was vigorous in late medieval piety and religious practice". The Stripping of the Altars and its conclusions proved popular, despite criticisms that Duffy has neglected addressing negative cultural components of the medieval church and that Duffy was unconvincing in saying that Catholic England had been killed by what the English historian Patrick Collinson called a "royal deus ex machina". When The Voices of Morebath was published in 2001, Duffy was the president of Magdalene College at the University of Cambridge.

== Contents ==
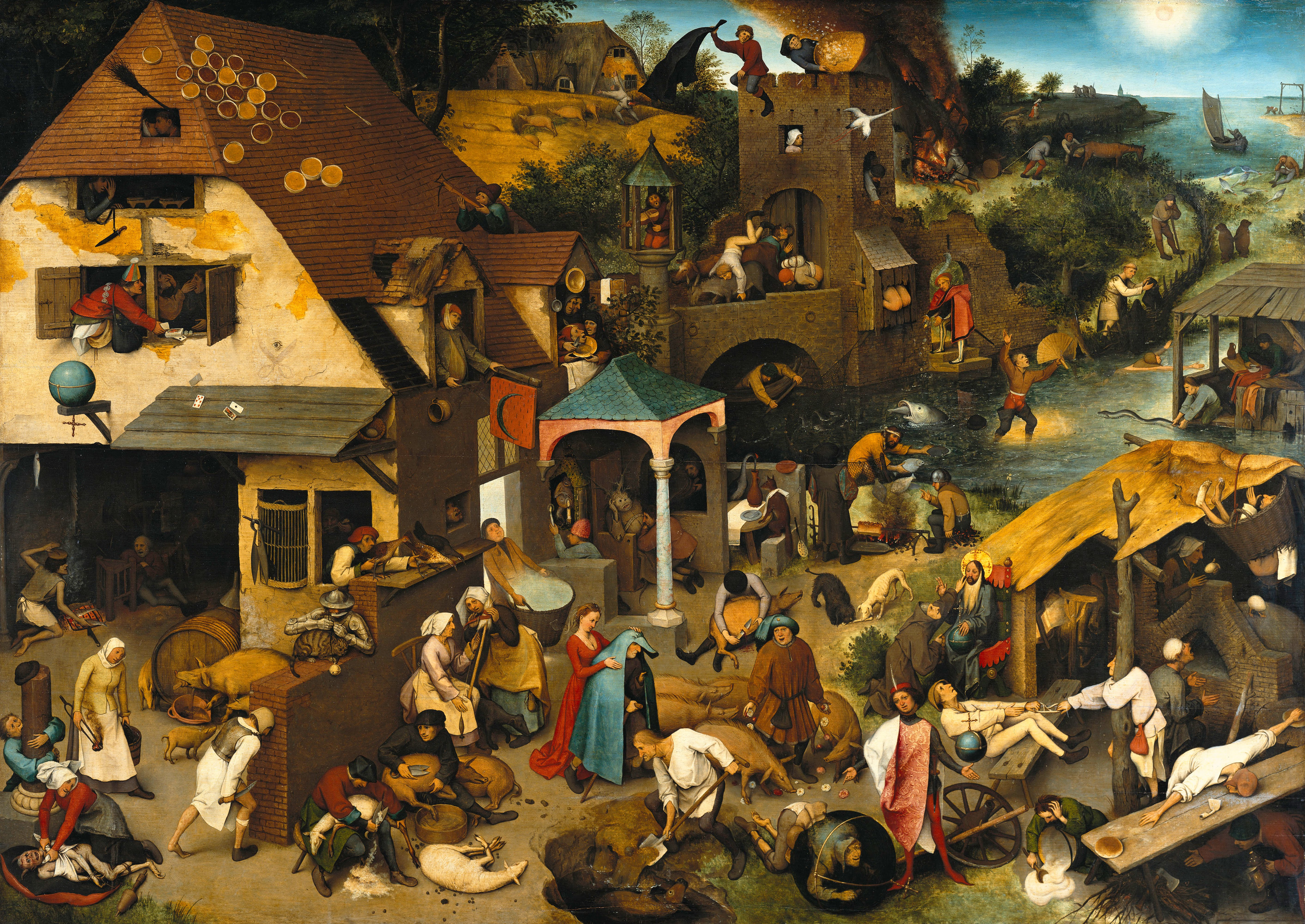
Netherlandish Proverbs (1559) by Pieter Bruegel the Elder appears on the book's dust jacket.

"The Voices of Morebath is about a small Devon village over the most traumatic and revolutionary 50 years of the 16th century, about what happened to their lifestyle because of the Reformation. The centre of the story, the centre of the village, is a priest, Sir Christopher Trychay [...] who kept the parish accounts, which he read out to his parishioners and into which he put the story of all their common concerns."

— Eamon Duffy

The Voices of Morebath: Reformation and Rebellion in an English Village, written by Duffy and published by Yale University Press in 2001, includes 16 pages of front matter and 232 pages of body matter. It has been printed in both a cloth hardcover edition and a paperback edition, the latter released in 2003. The dust jacket has a detail from the painting Netherlandish Proverbs (1559) by Pieter Bruegel the Elder. Bruegel's painting – alongside colour plates, woodcuts, and illustrated endpapers included in the book – was described by the reviewer Katherine L. French as "invok[ing] a sense of community and nostalgia for 'bygone' England".

Duffy intended The Voices of Morebath to serve as a "pendant" (paired work) for his earlier The Stripping of the Altars. Trychay's parish accounts, which span his tenure as Morebath's vicar from 1520 to 1574, are used extensively. Duffy holds that these "uniquely expansive and garrulous" parish accounts were read aloud to the congregation. The second printing, released several weeks after the first, contains details of Trychay's vicarage from an early 17th-century survey Duffy rediscovered too late for inclusion in the first printing. A fourth printing includes additional material drawn from ecclesiastical court records to detail a labourer's 1557 sword attack on Trychay.

The book details the Devon village of Morebath, its parish, and the priest Christopher Trychay as they reluctantly accepted English Protestantism despite their Catholic sympathies. The Voices of Morebath comprises seven chapters. The first chapter identifies the parish, the parish's congregants, and its place within the medieval village. The second chapter addresses Trychay's accounts and introduces the benefits and drawbacks of churchwardens' accounts. (Note: Patrick Collinson said that considering Trychay's records to be churchwardens' accounts "would be misleading, if conventional", as Trychay audited and recorded them for not only the wardens but also other elements of the parish.) Chapter three is devoted to how the accounts depict the parish's disputes and their resolutions. Chapter four traces the financial support for the parish and the parish's expenditures to identify the religious experience of Morebath. The fifth and sixth chapters address Morebath during the Reformation and include details on Morebath's parish subsidizing five men to join the 1549 Prayer Book Rebellion. Chapter seven depicts the resurgence of pre-Reformation community and devotions under Mary I followed by Elizabeth I's accession and the ultimate conformity of the parish.

Traditional, pre-Reformation life among Morebath's residents is depicted as showing little separation between the religious and the secular, with descriptions of how the villagers grazed the parish's sheep alongside their own flocks and partook in raucous events called church ales, replete with homemade beer and visiting minstrels at the parish's church house, to financially support the parish. Trychay's faith is shown as reflecting the beliefs of his congregation, with Duffy saying "[h]is religion in the end was the religion of Morebath".

With Henry VIII's 1534 separation of the Church of England from the Catholic Church, Trychay assented to the King's claims of supremacy over the pope. Morebath's parish no longer enjoyed the favour of a monastic landlord, who was replaced with unsympathetic speculators profiting from the dissolution of the monasteries. Though complying with Edward VI's Protestant religious impositions, Trychay is recorded as having hidden – rather than destroyed – expensive vestments that he had recently purchased after 20 years of saving up for them. In opposition to the government, the parish then subsidized five of its congregants to join the calamitous Prayer Book Rebellion at Exeter. In the aftermath, the parish's ornamental items were removed, defaced, or hidden to comply with Edwardine rule.

While Trychay rejoiced at Mary I's restoration of Catholicism, he accepted Protestantism and gladly embraced the duties and income of ministering to a second parish under her successor, Elizabeth I. The Elizabethan Religious Settlement reinstated some of the unpopular elements from Edward's time, though these were less jarring and afforded certain concessions to traditional practices. By 1570, when Trychay's ministry was coming to a close, the secular government's presence in Morebath is portrayed as more intrusive, while the saints and their associated objects, once familiar and venerated, are absent. Despite the changes in doctrine, Duffy establishes that the "rhythms of life" had resumed. (Note: While Collinson said Trychay is described as developing into "some kind of Protestant", Collinson said "to call him a Vicar of Bray [a clergyman who changed his beliefs to match official doctrinal changes] would be an insulting caricature".)

The Voices of Morebath's account of Morebath's involvement in the Prayer Book Rebellion deviates from previous narratives. Duffy had previously identified that Binney's edition of Trychay's records had misread "at their goyng forthe to sent davys down ys camppe" as "sent denys down" when Binney transcribed the account of five men armed and funded by the parish in 1549. In an earlier essay on Morebath, Duffy had corrected the error and recognized Saint David's Down as the site of the rebel camp outside Exeter, though Duffy believed these five men were sent as reinforcements for the besieged government troops. Duffy's stance changed with input from the English church historian Diarmaid MacCulloch, however, and The Voices of Morebath instead argues that these five men were sent to support the rebellion. Three of the five men from the parish's contingent are presented as likely among those killed in the Battle of Clyst St Mary. (Note: Duffy's essay acknowledging Binney's error but identifying Morebath's arming of five men as in support of government forces was published in 1997. Writing on the essay in The Voices of Morebath, Duffy said he "was unwilling to credit that Sir Christopher could have documented in detail the parish's involvement in armed rebellion". However, in the 2001 book, Duffy recognized two elements as contradicting his earlier thinking: that Tudor parishes demanded accountability of all expenditures – "[l]egal or illegal, money spent was money to be accounted for" – and that the parishioners of Morebath likely did not see themselves as rebels, but rather defenders of "ancient traditions against the king's bad counsellors, not the king".)

== Reception ==
Upon release, due to popular demand for work by Duffy, The Voices of Morebath sold better than Yale University Press had anticipated. The second printing was subsequently printed within a few weeks of the first's publication. In reviewing the book for Church History, Eric Josef Carlson wrote the book's "manageable length, lavish illustrations, and reasonable price demonstrate that author and publisher intended this book for a wide audience". However, Carlson held that occasionally "description is so densely detailed that all but a few scholars will find their attention wandering", adding that "most undergraduates will find themselves overwhelmed" and advised that the book was better suited for "students who have some experience reading historical scholarship". A 2002 review in the Virginia Quarterly Review said "[t]his book deserves a wide readership".

In his 2002 review for London Review of Books, the English historian Patrick Collinson contextualized The Stripping of the Altars with Dickens's work and the revisionist studies that challenged it, noting The Voices of Morebath's role as a pendant to Duffy's earlier work. Lucy Wooding, a historian of the Tudor period, called the work "invaluable" as "a contribution to debate on the English Reformation" in a 2001 review for Reviews in History. Wooding said that there was evidence Duffy's own views had developed during his time writing the book. Tom Betteridge, writing in 2003 for the journal Reformation, recommended an "odd couple" pairing, suggesting that readers of The Voices of Morebath should treat it as "companion volume" to MacCulloch's contemporaneous work Tudor Church Militant.

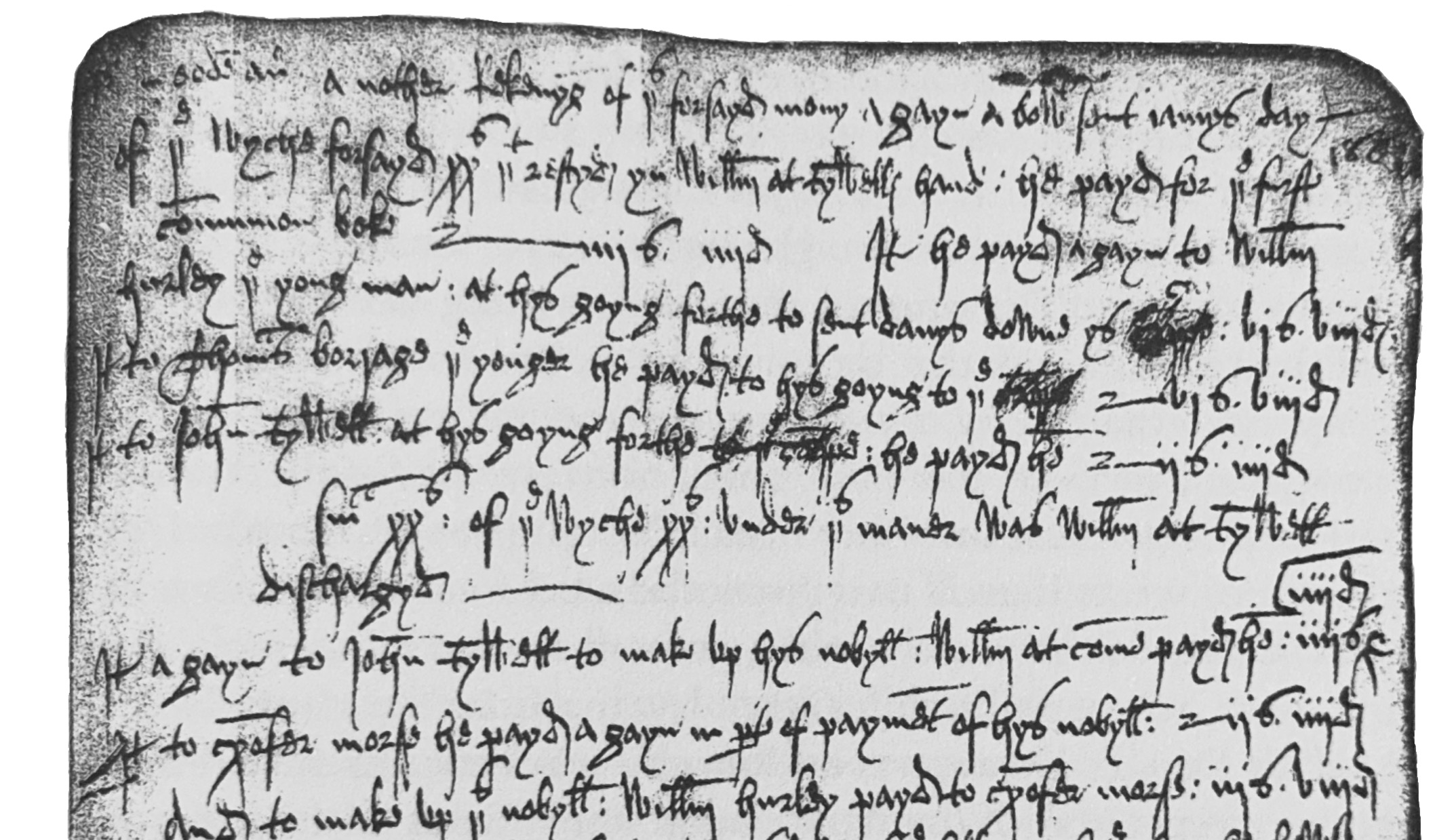
Trychay's account detailing the equipping of five parishioners to join the 1549 Prayer Book Rebellion at St David's Down outside Exeter. An image of this record appears in the book.

David Loades, a specialist in Tudor history who reviewed the book in a 2003 review for Albion, acknowledged the evidence for the parish's support of the 1549 rebellion concealed in the accounts. However, he believed that it "perhaps hardly merits a share of the [book's] title". Keith Thomas wrote on The Voice of Morebath in 2002 for The New York Review of Books and said that the reliance on Trychay's accounts resulted in Morebath's history being recalled from the perspective of a Catholic priest without input from its lay population. Thomas acknowledged Duffy's efforts to mitigate this narrow perspective, and recommended the fourth printing – with its "tantalizing" account of the sword attack on Trychay – to readers on the grounds that it indicated a greater diversity of religious persuasions in Reformation Morebath.

Kingdon, writing in a 2003 review for the Journal of Interdisciplinary History, said the book was limited in what conclusions it could claim regarding the English Reformation due to its reliance on a single source, but lauded Duffy's "remarkable empathy and impressive technical research skills". Wooding said "the evidence is too slender to sustain any very broad conclusions". Referencing "Duffy's suggestion that women were perhaps treated better in an era where the Virgin and St. Sidwell were widely venerated", Wooding said it could remain only "interesting speculation". Carlson approved of Duffy's "refusal" to "claim too much", citing a lecture Duffy gave shortly after the book's publication that described using Trychay's accounts as "trying to describe a house by looking through a keyhole"; Carlson responded in his review, remarking, "But what a keyhole!"

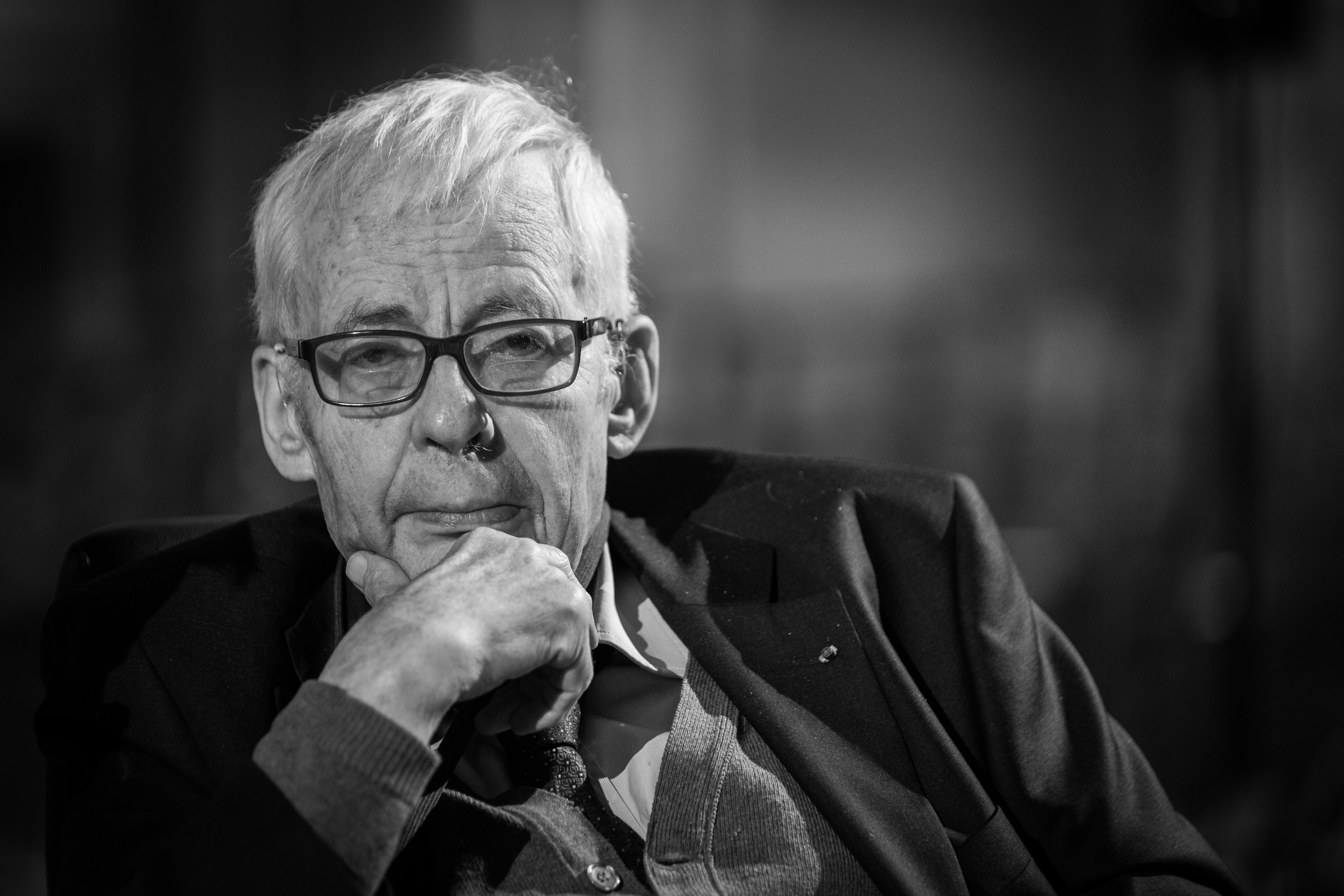
Duffy's micro-historical approach in The Voices of Morebath has been compared to the work of the medievalist Emmanuel Le Roy Ladurie.

The Voices of Morebath has been recognized as a micro-history in the tradition established by Emmanuel Le Roy Ladurie's 1975 book Montaillou on 14th-century French Pyrenean peasants. Thomas said The Voices of Morebath "is a fine piece of microhistory, even if it is not the English Montaillou", and that a thorough understanding of the English Reformation required a "look at the movers and shakers: the politicians and the bishops, the evangelical preachers and the godly laymen". Thomas added that Duffy lacked sympathy for such major figures, "but, like many Catholic historians before him, he has a deep sympathy for a vanished world".

Collinson, calling the work "a microhistorical threnody and lament", identified "Trychay's centrality" in the 2001 book as the result of "our almost total dependence on his accounts" following the destruction of Morebath's other records in the Second World War. In Collinson's view, this resulted in The Voices of Morebath not providing a comprehensive view of the parish, its people, and Trychay himself. Saying "Duffy's regret for a little world lost is understandable and even justified", Collinson added that history "can never hope to recapture what it might have meant actually to live in those worlds".

Loades called The Voices of Morebath "local history at its best". He appraised Trychay's records as 54 years of "running commentary ... under the guise" of churchwardens' accounts. Agreeing with Duffy that "you cannot write the history of the English Reformation on such a narrow base", Loades said "we should be grateful" towards Duffy and Trychay "for this fascinating glimpse of the past; even if the latter was something of an unamiable busybody".

=== Awards ===
Duffy was awarded the Hawthornden Prize for Literature for The Voices of Morebath in June 2002. Carlson's review compared it to a previous Hawthornden Prize winner, Graham Greene for his novel The Power and the Glory. Holding that "it is hard to think of Voices of Morebath as a masterpiece equal to Greene's novel", Carlson said that both books "give us the life of an all-too-human priest, an insignificant figure in the grand scheme of history but someone nonetheless rather representative of his time".

The Voices of Morebath was shortlisted for the 2002 Samuel Johnson Prize for Non-Fiction. It was also shortlisted for the British Academy Book Prize for accessible scholarly writing within the humanities and social sciences in that award's second year. The prize's judges described The Voices of Morebath as a "jewel of a book. A subtle exposition of the human significance of a major transition in English religious history."

Award	Date	Result	Ref.
Hawthornden Prize for Literature	June 2002	Won	
British Academy Book Prize	2002	Shortlisted	
Samuel Johnson Prize for Non-Fiction	2002	Shortlisted	

== Legacy ==
=== Cultural ===
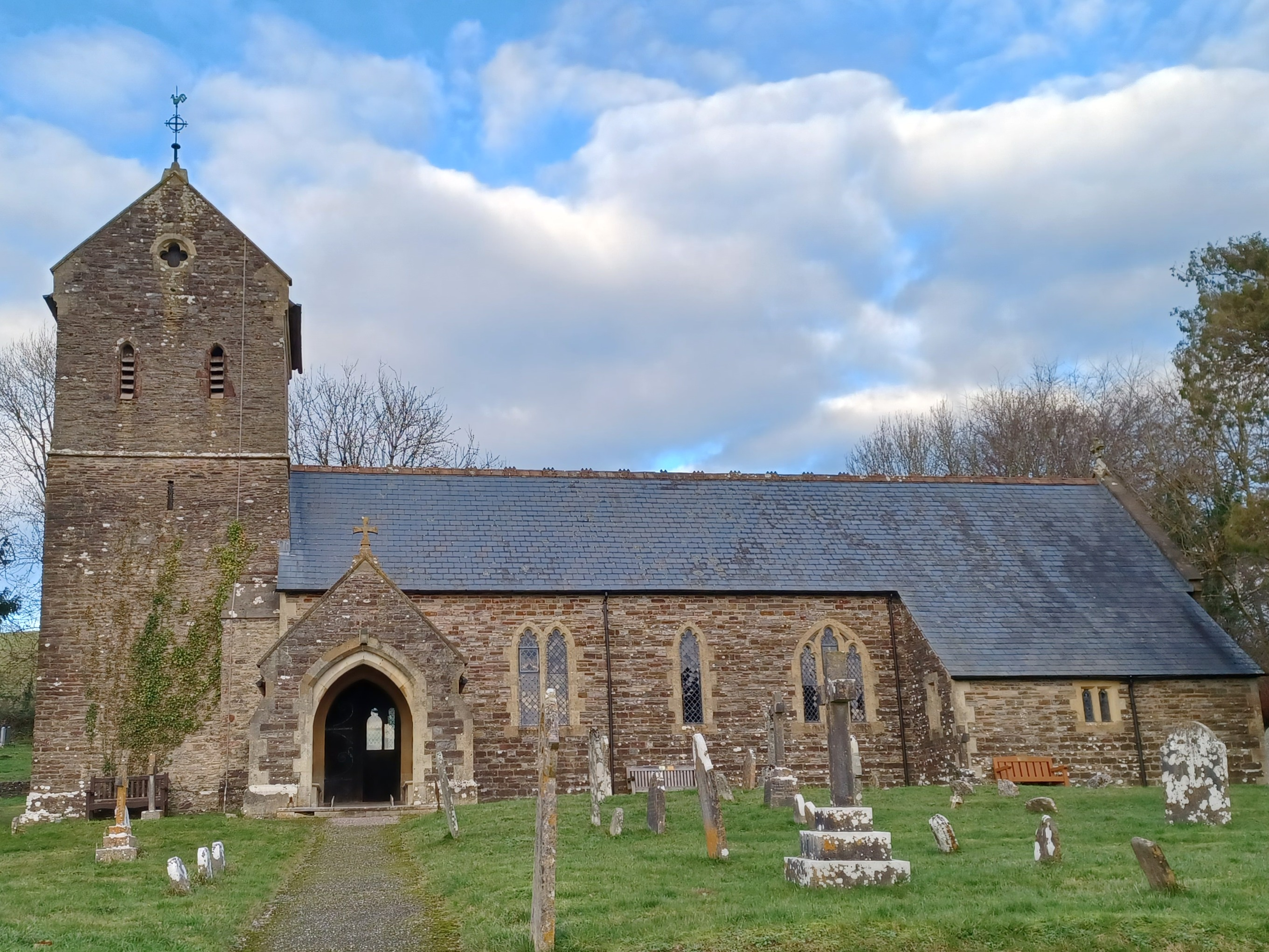
Trychay was vicar of St George's Church (pictured). The parish has reported hundreds of visitors coming after reading Duffy's account of its 16th-century history in The Voices of Morebath.

Engagement with The Voices of Morebath has spanned a variety of groups. Following the book's publication, an English Heritage sign was installed in Morebath and St George's Church reported that hundreds of people have come to visit after reading about it in Duffy's work. The village has also been featured on historical television programming regarding the English Reformation: Ann Widdecombe's 2009 series Christianity: A History included an interview with Duffy and used Morebath to describe the Reformation's impact on the English rural classes, while the Reformation episode of BBC Two's 2012 The Great British Story: A People's History also focussed on Morebath.

Referring to the secularizing role of urbanization on religious experience, the Church of England priest Giles Legood pointed to The Voices of Morebath as providing historical context in "an example of the profound impact that religion had in the English countryside". In 2017, the Anglo-Catholic Church of England priest Giles Fraser credited The Voices of Morebath as "shift[ing] the way a great many people understood the English Reformation", pointing to the book as evidence that Duffy's works have been focussed on exposing "Puritan propaganda". Fraser also considered Duffy "a dogged defender of all things Catholic". Convinced by Duffy's argument against the popular narrative that the English Reformation had overturned a system "dripping in ecclesiastical finery, fat with profit, corrupted by ambition and a stranger to the poor", Fraser wrote that Morebath's parish contradicted this "caricature". While also agreeing with the Duffy in regretting the Reformation's disruptions of "liturgical rhythms", Fraser held that such ritual practices had been restored to the Church of England by the 19th-century Oxford Movement and opposed the idea that Duffy's work should convince readers to become Catholic.

In 2023, the vicar of St Ives in Cornwall drew criticism after installing beer pumps in St Ia's Church for that year's St Ives Festival. In light of the debate around St Ia's Church, Christopher Howse of The Daily Telegraph wrote that the use of churches for social events has been controversial in England for centuries. Howse cited The Voices of Morebath to establish that, in the West Country from the 1450s onward, parishes constructed church houses that were built adjacent to churchyard specifically for hosting social events, such as the highly profitable church ales. (Note: Morebath received an order to cease celebrating church ales in 1548. However, the parish resumed fundraising through the sale of ale in 1551, albeit not in the context of an event. Its church house, built with volunteers from the community, no longer stands.) The National Churches Trust, a charity dedicated to preserving British church buildings, published a report in 2024 that suggested churches should host social events to ensure their survival in the face of increased secularization. An editorial in The Guardian positively compared this proposal to Duffy's description of church ales and suggested "historic places of communal worship can still find a social vocation in the 21st century".

=== Academic ===
As of 2017, Duffy considered The Voices of Morebath to be his best book. The Catholic historian Dominic Selwood, in a 2018 review of Duffy's Royal Books and Holy Bones for the Catholic Herald, identified The Stripping the Altars and The Voices of Morebath as Duffy "punching irreparable holes through accepted wisdom". In a 2021 review for Church Times on Duffy's essay collection A People's Tragedy: Studies in Reformation, Richard Chartres, former Church of England Bishop of London, credited Duffy's work in The Stripping the Altars and The Voices of Morebath with revising the understanding of English religion on the eve of Reformation and resistance among the laity and clergy to early Protestantism.

The historian Carlos Eire, reviewing Duffy's 2011 book Fires of Faith, suggested that The Voices of Morebath served as a response to criticism of The Stripping of the Altars. Some responses to The Stripping of the Altars included accusations that Duffy had cherry-picked sources to support his arguments in that book, whereas Eire described The Voices of Morebath as a "counter-blast" in the form of "an exhaustively detailed microhistory". Eire held that Fires of Faith continued Duffy's revisionism from The Stripping of the Altars and The Voices of Morebath.

The French historian Jean-Pierre Moreau assessed both The Stripping of the Altars and The Voices of Morebath as in revisionist tradition of English scholarship on the English Reformation. Writing in 2004, Moreau observed that a new school of English Reformation history, post-revisionism, had developed since 1990. Moreau said that post-revisionists evaluated Dickens's thesis, saying the false conception that the religious revolution came "from the bottom" was not actually present. However, they also accepted some revisionist criticisms of Dickens. Post-revisionist historians, such as Alec Ryrie, emphasize considering how socio-economic and cultural factors may have induced the English Reformation.

Robert Lutton's Lollardy and Orthodox Religion in Pre‐Reformation England, published in 2006 by the Royal Historical Society and Boydell Press, explicitly responded to Duffy's The Voices of Morebath. In detailing religious practices in Tenterden's parish during the period of Lollardy in early 16th-century England up to 1535, Lutton emulated Duffy's use of a parochial study. However, rather than utilizing churchwardens' accounts like Trychay's with their unitary narratives, Lutton utilized the community's wills. These wills offered multiple perspectives, which Lutton used to challenge Duffy's revisionist stance of a unified medieval English religion. Lutton's argument promoted a theory that multiple expressions of piety existed during this period and asserted that some were compatible with the Reformation's doctrines.

Historians have compared The Voices of Morebath to later micro-histories, describing it as an inspiration for similarly focussed works. Sheilagh O'Brien, a historian at the University of Divinity's St Francis College, identified The Voices of Morebath as an example of a micro-history on the English Reformation that is accessible to readers who do not find history compelling or encountered it inaccurately portrayed in popular works of fiction. She said that The Voices of Morebath and The Return of Martin Guerre and their emphases on the lives of ordinary people had inspired further micro-histories, such as Suzannah Lipscomb's 2019 The Voices of Nîmes on women brought before Huguenot ecclesiastical courts. Justin Colson, reviewing Christopher Dyer's 2012 A Country Merchant, 1495–1520 for Reviews in History, found Dyer's description of medieval economics through the study of a specific individual similar to Duffy's use of Trychay's life to illustrate English Reformation religion.
