= All Saints' Church, Huntsham =

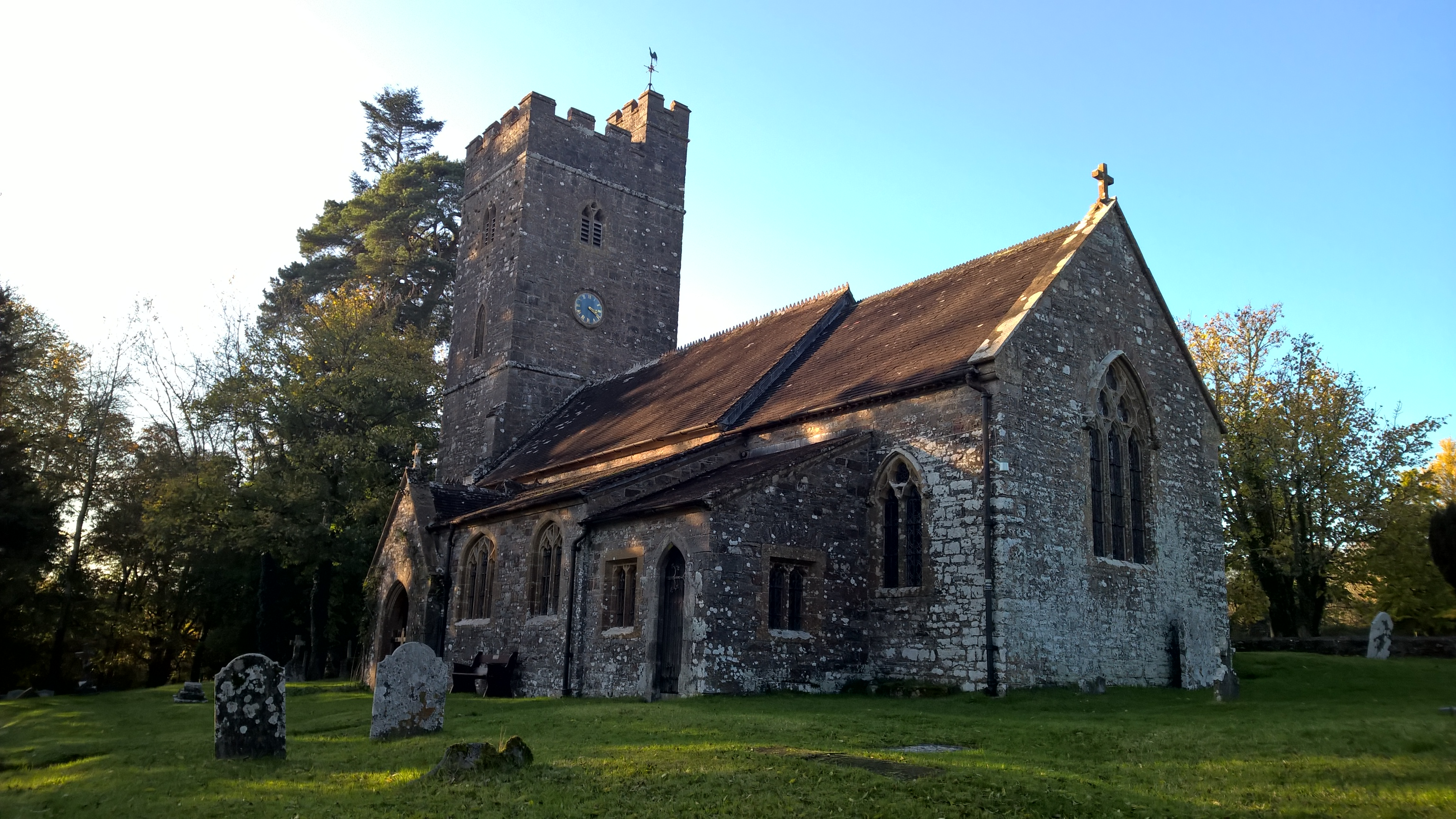
- All Saints' Church, Huntsham
- All Saints' Church, Huntsham
- 50°58′30″N 3°25′26″W
- OS grid reference: ST 00137 20461
- Location: Huntsham, Devon
- Country: England
- Denomination: Church of England
- Website: hukeleymissioncommunity.org

History
- Founded: Tower circa 14th Century
- Consecrated: 15 June 1336

Architecture
- Architect: Benjamin Ferrey (rebuild 1854–56)

Specifications
- Height: 60 feet (18 m)

Administration
- Diocese: Diocese of Exeter
- Archdeaconry: Exeter
- Deanery: Tiverton and Cullompton
- Parish: Huntsham

Clergy
- Rector: The Revd Kevin Chandra

All Saints' Church, Huntsham is a Grade II* listed parish church in the Church of England. It is in the small village of Huntsham, about 5.8 miles (9.3 km) to the north-east of Tiverton. It is part of the Hukeley Mission group of parishes, which also includes St Michael & All Angels in Bampton, St Peter's in Clayhanger, St Petrock's in Petton and St George's in Morebath.

== History ==
Records indicate that Huntsham Church was one of several consecrated on 15 June 1336 and was extended in 1430; diocesan registers state that the first rector was Roger de Respremme, in 1263. The register which dates from 1558 records that in 1666 a donation of £2 0s 3d was sent by the parish for relief of the Great Fire of London.

By 1850 the church was described by White's Directory as an ancient ivy-mantled structure in terminal decay due to many years of neglect by the estate's owner, Rev. Edward Berkeley Troyte. Living next door at Huntsham Court, the Rev. Troyte was known locally as "the sporting parson" and was said to keep traps and snares hidden in the church.

His successor in 1852, Arthur Troyte, wasted no time in setting about the restoration of the church, and within six months had employed Benjamin Ferrey to rebuild it completely between 1854 and 1856; as it stands today, only the lower section of the church tower remains from the 14th century. Troyte was a High Church patron who designed some of the details himself; he was actively involved in the rebuilding not only of All Saints but of other churches in the diocese. He ensured that only the finest materials were used with seasoned oak, Ham Hill stone, Maws encaustic floor tiles, and stained glass by Wailes. As part of the work, the churchyard was also enlarged and a lychgate built. Troyte also undertook to pay for the work personally, raising £500 for the project by selling 1,000 oak trees to the Royal Navy in Plymouth.

When Arthur's wife Fanny died only two months before the restoration was completed in November 1856, the parishioners gave a richly decorated octagonal font of Caen stone in her memory; similarly, the candelabrum which hangs in the nave was given in Arthur's memory when he died in 1857. Fanny's and Arthur's graves in the churchyard are marked by Grade II listed iron crosses with the letters F and A. A full account of the rebuilding of Huntsham is given in the Transactions of the Exeter Diocesan Architectural Society.

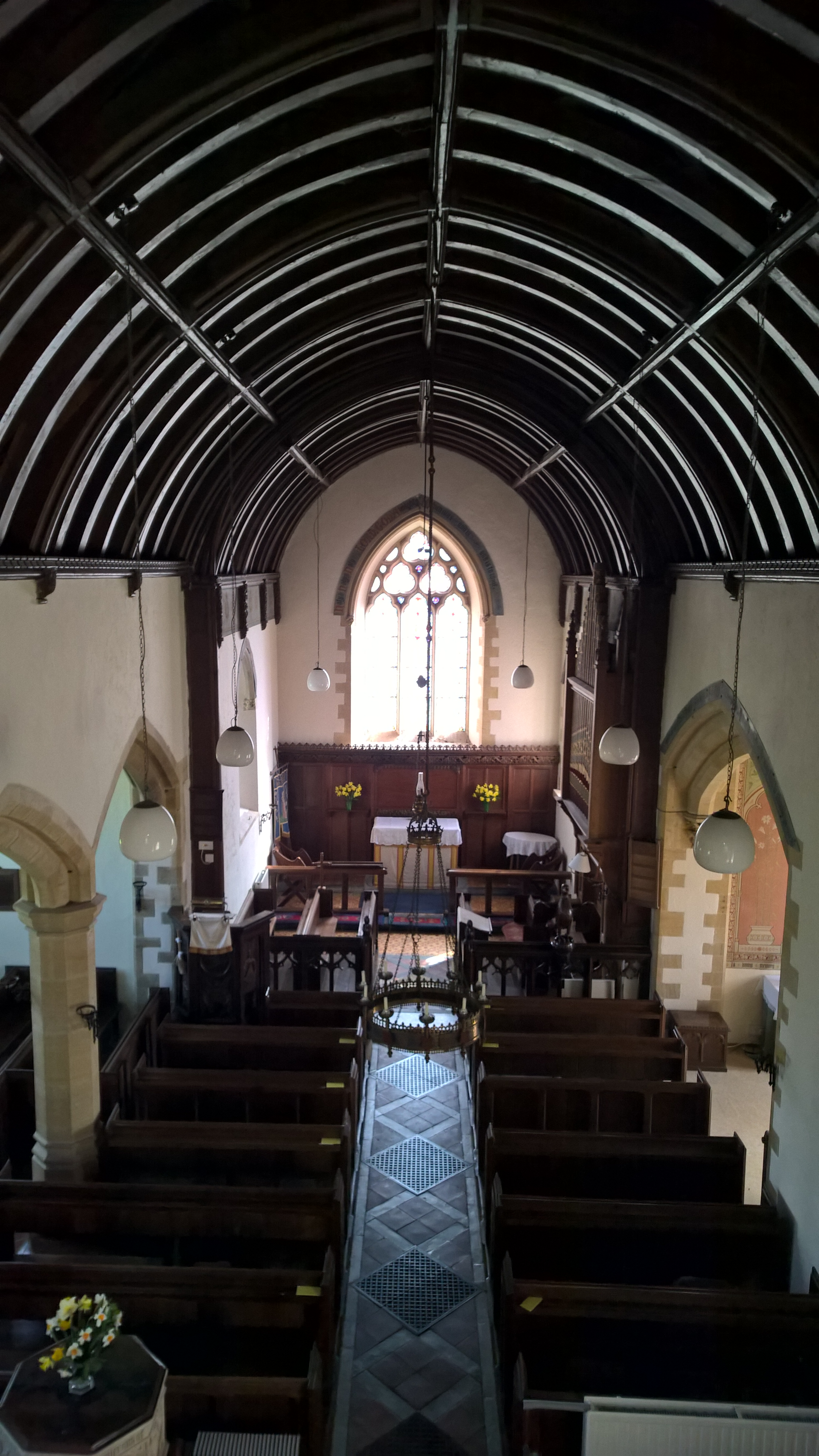
Interior view from the gallery

Arthur Troyte's son Charles Troyte continued to make improvements to the church: the north aisle was added in 1871, and more bells were added. First in 1866 he added three new bells to make a ring of six; he added two more bells in 1874 to allow the ringing of a full peal of 5,040 true and complete changes without repetition. This was achieved on 2 February 1875 when the first full peal of 5,040 Grandsire Triples was conducted by John Acland Troyte, a feat which a plaque in the ringing chamber records. In 1872 Charles Troyte wrote Change Ringing, a standard textbook on bell ringing which long after his death contributed indirectly to English literature when Dorothy L. Sayers found a copy in the bargain box of a second-hand bookshop: taking it home, she was inspired to write The Nine Tailors.

Charles Troyte's son was a decorated soldier and MP for Tiverton Sir Gilbert Acland-Troyte. His grave, like those of his father and grandfather, lies in the churchyard.

The bell ringing tradition at Huntsham continues today with All Saints being used for extended practice by The Troyte Ringing Centre thanks to its sound-controlled tower.

== Organ ==
According to the National Pipe Organ Register, the church organ is by Hele & Co. Dating from 1896, the painted decoration on the pipes is in memory of Charles Troyte, who died that year.

== Clock ==
The clock on the east wall of the tower was supplied by the renowned Messrs Smith and Son of Derby in 1912; it was paid for by a collection of £34. It strikes on the hour; before being made electric some years ago it needed winding every week.

== Clergy ==
The following list of clergy has been derived from two sources. Pre-1700 clergy are listed in the 1846 Monasticon Dioecesis Exoniensis, with post-1700 clergy listed in a local reference, Old Parsonage – a brief history.

* Roger de Resprenne 1263–1278	* George Watson 1813–1818
* Sir Walter de Bantane 1278	* H Barker 1818–1827
* William de Trehunsy 1308	* J Wills 1827–1830
* William de Carnadone 1340	* Peter Tucker 1832–1835
* Sir John Willesden 1418	* Channon? Holt 1836
* Sir Walter Clutterville 1425	* Francis D Seymour 1835–1852
* Sir John French 1429	* Robert Dunn 1854–1887
* Sir William Kyrke 1434	* Philip C Rossiter 1887–1890
* Sir Thomas Foxe	* George Cruddas 1890–1894
* Sir Thomas Whiplynge 1438	* Giffard T Nash 1894–1896
* Sir John Chivelere 1439	* AR Hudson 1898–1924
* Thomas Ley 1439–1444	* AC Keene 1921–1931
* Sir Jon Baker 1444	* FN Bird 1931–1933
* Sir Geoffrey Motte 1449	* RM Henderson 1933–1936
* Sir Simon Halsanger 1453	* Charles Lane 1936–1947
* Henry Downe 1574	* J Jones 1947–1957
* Thomas Seale 1588–1629	* E Hughes 1957–1962
* Edward Seale 1629–1638	* W Haythornthwaite 1962–1966
* John Padfield 1638–1656	* Govier (visiting) 1966–1968
* Benedict Ball 1663	* KR Coath 1968–1976
* John Mayper 1675	* Don M Clarridge 1977–1983
* Francis Durbrow 1693	* M Boyes 1983–1993
* Francis Foort 1725–1761	* K Gale 1993–1999
* William Milton 1756	* John Stone 1999–2010
* Tristram Whitter 1767–1771	* Lynne Burgon 2011-2014
* Eardley Pearse 1785	* Kevin Chandra 2015–2025
* Edward B Troyte 1796–1852	* Charles Wheeler 2026-

== Summerhouse ==
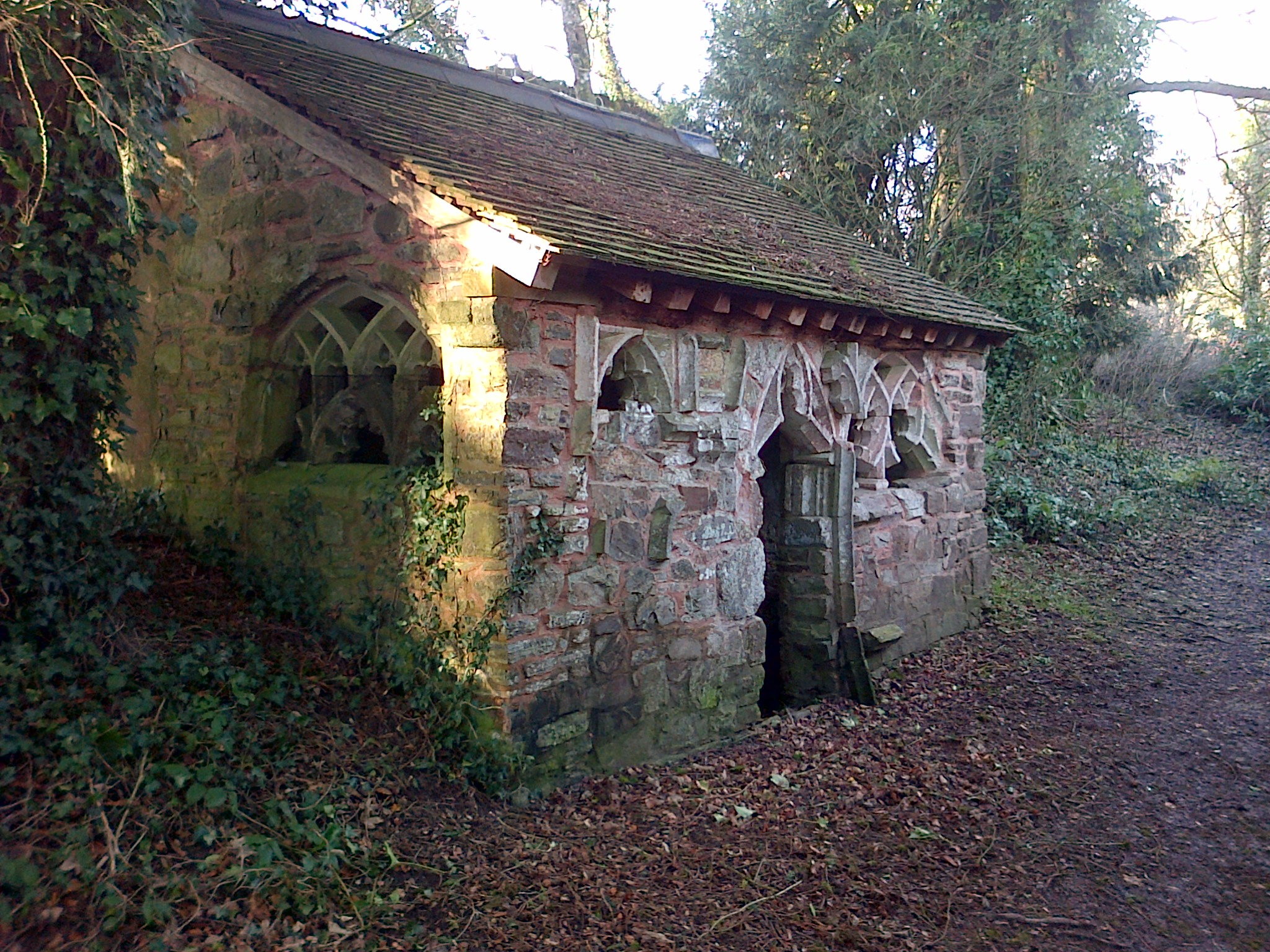
Summerhouse

Approximately 100 metres to the north west of the church is a small summerhouse in the woods constructed from medieval material from the church, during the works of either 1854 or 1871 mentioned above. According to the listing detail it has a stone outside rear wall partly of cob, reused stone tracery to the front and left, and a monopitch plain tile roof made from part of the original Medieval wagon roof structure.
