= St George's Church, Morebath =

Church in Devon, England

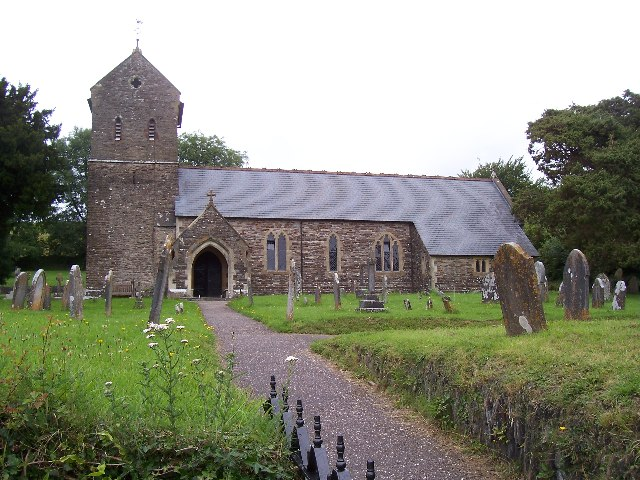
- St George's Church, Morebath
- St George's Church, Morebath
- 51°0′55″N 3°29′32″W
- OS grid reference: SS 95423 25047
- Location: Morebath
- Country: England
- Denomination: Church of England
- Website: hukeleymissioncommunity.org

History
- Founded: Tower built before 1300

Architecture
- Heritage designation: Grade II* listed
- Architect: William Butterfield (rebuild 1874-1875)

Administration
- Diocese: Diocese of Exeter
- Archdeaconry: Exeter
- Deanery: Tiverton and Cullompton
- Parish: Morebath

Clergy
- Rector: The Revd Kevin Chandra

St George's Church, Morebath is a Grade II* listed parish church in the Church of England Diocese of Exeter in Morebath, Devon. It is part of the Hukeley Mission group of parishes, which also includes St Michael & All Angels Bampton, St Peter's in Clayhanger, St Petrock's in Petton and All Saints in Huntsham.

== History ==
The church dates from the 13th century but much is from the 15th century.

The building was restored by William Butterfield between 1874 and 1875.

The role of the parish church in Morebath in the 16th century is described in Eamon Duffy's book The Voices of Morebath. Further insight into life in the village and church are provided by the handwritten records of the Revd. Christopher Trychay (Vicar from 1520 to 1574).

== Organ ==
The organ is by William Hill and Son and dates from 1874. A specification of the organ can be found on the National Pipe Organ Register.
