= Huntsham Court =

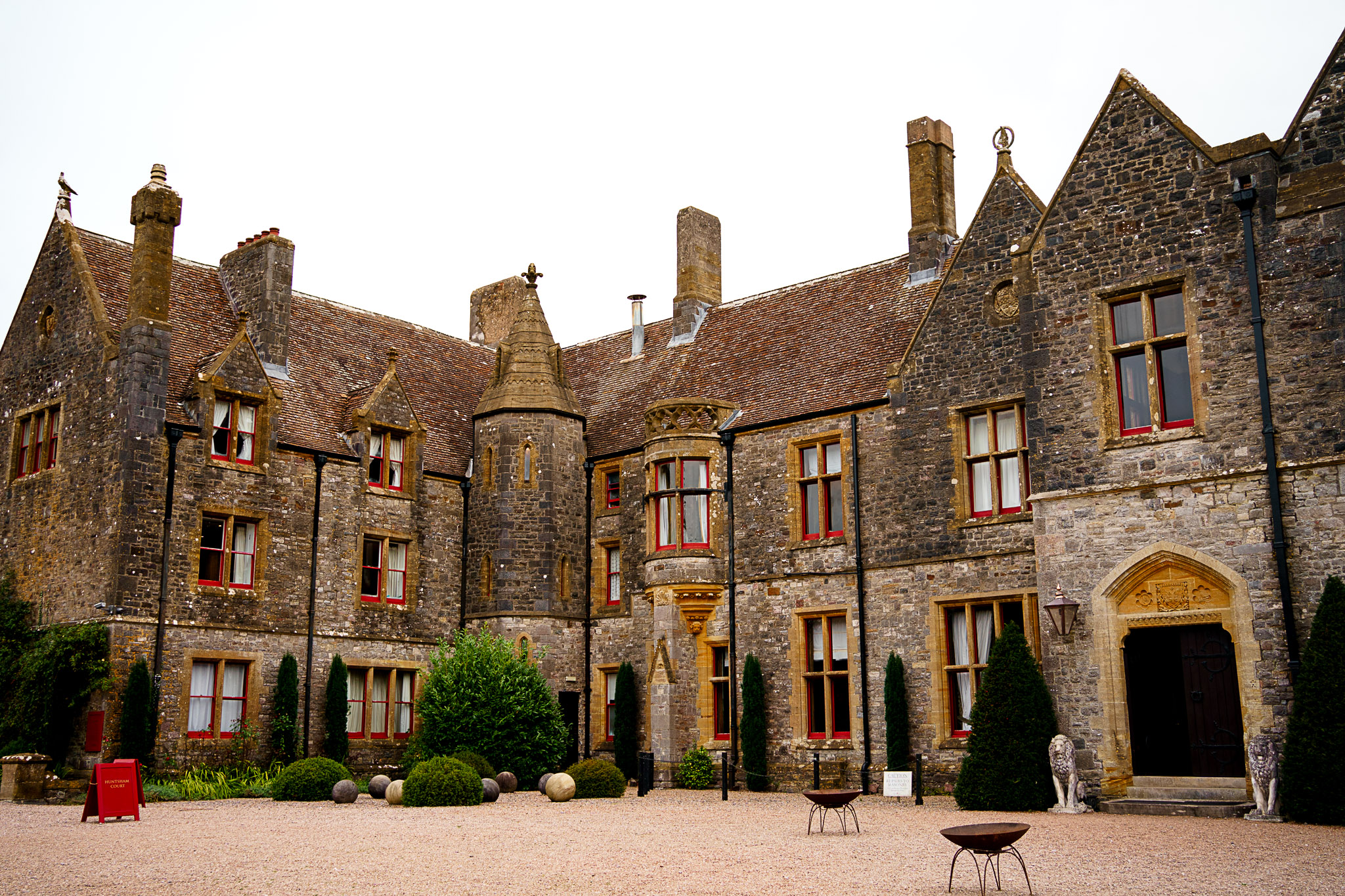
- Huntsham Court Country House, Devon.
- Interactive map of the Huntsham Court area

General information
- Type: English country house
- Architectural style: Gothic Revival
- Location: Huntsham, Devon, England
- Coordinates: 50°58′34″N 3°25′23″W
- Construction started: 1868
- Completed: 1870
- Owner: Privately owned

Design and construction
- Architect: Benjamin Ferrey
- Designations: Grade II* listed

Website
- www.huntshamcourt.co.uk

Huntsham Court is a Grade II* listed country house in Huntsham, Devon, England. Built in 1868–70, it was designed in the Tudor Gothic style by Benjamin Ferrey for Charles Troyte. It was then the home of his son and local MP, Sir Gilbert Acland Troyte. From 1978 until 2004 it was run as a hotel, it has since been used as a venue for weddings and other functions.

== Description ==
Nikolaus Pevsner described it as a "grand mansion of 1868–70... in a rather forbidding Tudor Gothic, asymmetrical, with two projecting wings, but given a little romance by an angled stair-turret." A feature of particular interest is an octagonal kitchen based on the Abbot's Kitchen at Glastonbury Abbey.

== History ==
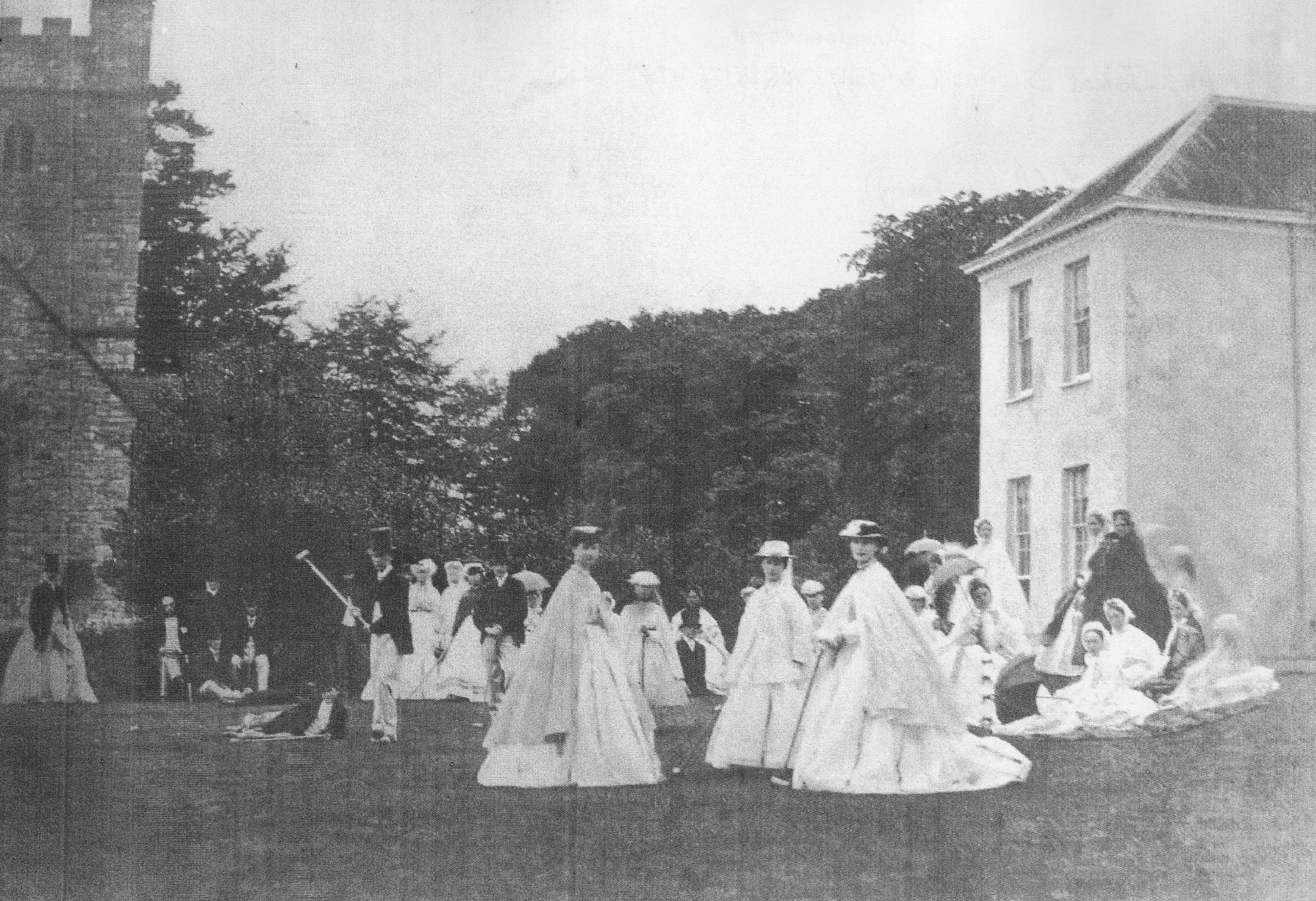
The only known photograph of the old Huntsham Court from 1865

Troyte's Estate Act 1866
- Act of Parliament
- Parliament of the United Kingdom
- Long title: An Act for authorizing the Trustees of the Will of the Reverend Edward Berkeley Troyte, Doctor of Laws, deceased, to pull down the existing Family Mansion of Huntsham Court, and to build a new Family Mansion on a fresh Site on Part of the Estates subject to the Limitations of the same Will, situate in the Parish of Huntsham in the County of Devon; and for other Purposes.
- Citation: 29 & 30 Vict. c. 4 Pr.

Dates
- Royal assent: 23 July 1866

Text of statute as originally enacted

The building of the present Huntsham Court came about when Charles Troyte married Katharine Mary Walrond of Cullompton in 1864. Her family considered the then dilapidated existing Elizabethan mansion to be unsuitable for their daughter so it was decided that the old house should be demolished and the new court built. To gain the necessary permission a private act of Parliament, Troyte's Estate Act 1866 (29 & 30 Vict. c. 4 Pr.) was passed in 1866, that required £10,000 to be deposited to cover the cost of rebuilding. The new court was sited slightly to the north of the old house which was very much closer to All Saints' Church as shown in the photo to the left. Much of the original Tudor wood panelling was reused in the main hall and remains there. According to contemporary newspaper reports the house was built at a cost of £13,000 by Messrs Dove Brothers of London.

The architect Benjamin Ferrey had restored the adjacent All Saints' Church for Arthur Troyte between 1854–6 and was also likely to be responsible for the 1871 addition to the church shortly after completing the Court for Charles Troyte.

In 2014 the property won the Hudson Heritage Award for Commercial Innovation for creating a new way of celebrating the "historic built environment" whilst preserving it for future generations, supporting local businesses and suppliers whilst also enabling the public to enjoy and use the building.

== Notable guests ==
While the house functioned as a hotel, Douglas Adams stayed for ten weeks in the summer of 1984 to work on his book So Long, and Thanks for All the Fish; the fourth book in his "trilogy", The Hitchhiker's Guide to the Galaxy. In M. J. Simpson's biography of Adams, he notes that no progress was made towards the novel and instead focuses on his drinking of wine. Steve Meretzky, who accompanied Adams to develop a Hitchhiker's video game, also said they were both behind schedule and admitted to "sipping expensive wines" during their stay. On another occasion, a call came from America offering Douglas £50,000 to write a Hitchhiker's Guide to the Galaxy calendar. A few weeks later, having done no work towards it, another call came saying the deal had fallen through but that he would still be paid half the fee; realising he had made £25,000 for doing nothing, Adams asked the owners of Huntsham Court for the biggest bottle of champagne in the cellar. When the book was finally published Adams placed a dedication to Huntsham Court and its owners at the front of the book; he returned many times and even invested in the hotel.

In 2013, Liam Gallagher's band Beady Eye used the house as a backdrop for its "Shine a Light" video.

In 2018, the house was used as a location in the opening episode of season 15 for the reality television series Made in Chelsea.
