= Morebath =

Village in Devon, England

Coordinates: 51°0′50″N 3°29′27″W

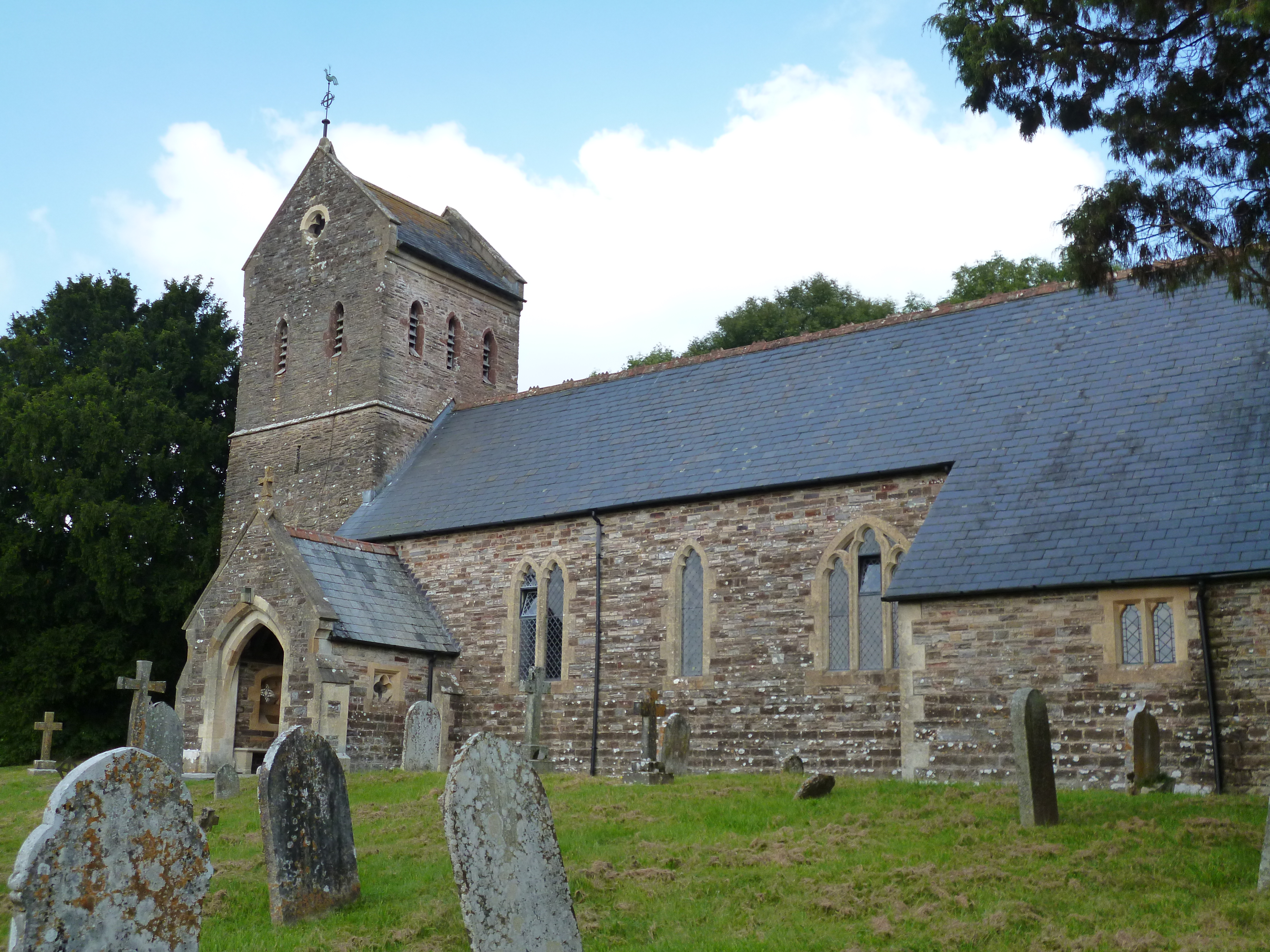
- St George's Church, Morebath

- Location within Devon
- OS grid reference: SS9551724913
- District: Mid Devon
- Shire county: Devon
- Region: South West
- Country: England
- Sovereign state: United Kingdom
- Post town: TIVERTON
- Postcode district: EX16
- Dialling code: 01884
- Police: Devon and Cornwall
- Fire: Devon and Somerset
- Ambulance: South Western
- UK Parliament: Tiverton and Minehead

Morebath is an upland village in the county of Devon, England. It is mostly given over to sheep-farming, and situated on the southern edge of Exmoor.

An account of life in Morebath in the 16th century can be read in The Voices of Morebath: Reformation and Rebellion in an English Village by Eamon Duffy. Then, as now, Morebath was populated by no more than 300 people, drawn from some thirty families, living and working on the land. During the often turbulent period of the Reformation, its inhabitants relied on the guidance of their priest, Christopher Trychay, Vicar of Morebath from 1520 to 1574. His detailed hand-written records were transcribed by the Rev. J. Erskine Binney, and published by James G. Commin of Exeter in 1904 as a separate volume in the Devon Notes & Queries series, under the title The Accounts of the Wardens of the Parish of Morebath, Devon. They provide an insight into the life of this small English community. The church is dedicated to St. George.

The village was formerly served by two railway stations. Morebath railway station (initially opened in 1873 as "Morebath and Bampton") on the Devon and Somerset Railway was actually nearer to Shillingford, about 1.5 miles (2.4 km) from Morebath itself. Morebath Junction Halt, which opened in 1928, was a single-platform halt set among fields in the valley beyond Ashtown Farm, and had no access road, though there was a footpath to it from Ashtown, which extended along the edge of fields to Chilpark on the B3190, close to the main part of the village. It was served by the Exe Valley Railway, as well as the Devon and Somerset line, and therefore had a better service than Morebath railway station: it was also much closer to Morebath village itself. Both stations closed in 1966.

== Notable residents ==
- Christopher Trychay (died 1574), vicar of Morebath from 1520 to 1574, recorded detailed parish accounts during the Reformation.
- Charles Sandford Bere (1829–1889), first-class cricketer and clergyman, served as vicar of Morebath from 1885 to 1889.
- Alyse Gregory (1884–1967), American-British suffragist and writer, lived in Morebath from 1957 until her death.
- Oliver Stonor (1903–1987), English novelist and translator, resided at Velthams Cottage from 1960 onwards.
- Caroline Quentin (born 1960), actress known for Men Behaving Badly and Jonathan Creek, lives in Morebath with her family.
