= Gilbert Acland-Troyte =

British soldier and Conservative Party politician

Sir Gilbert Acland-Troyte
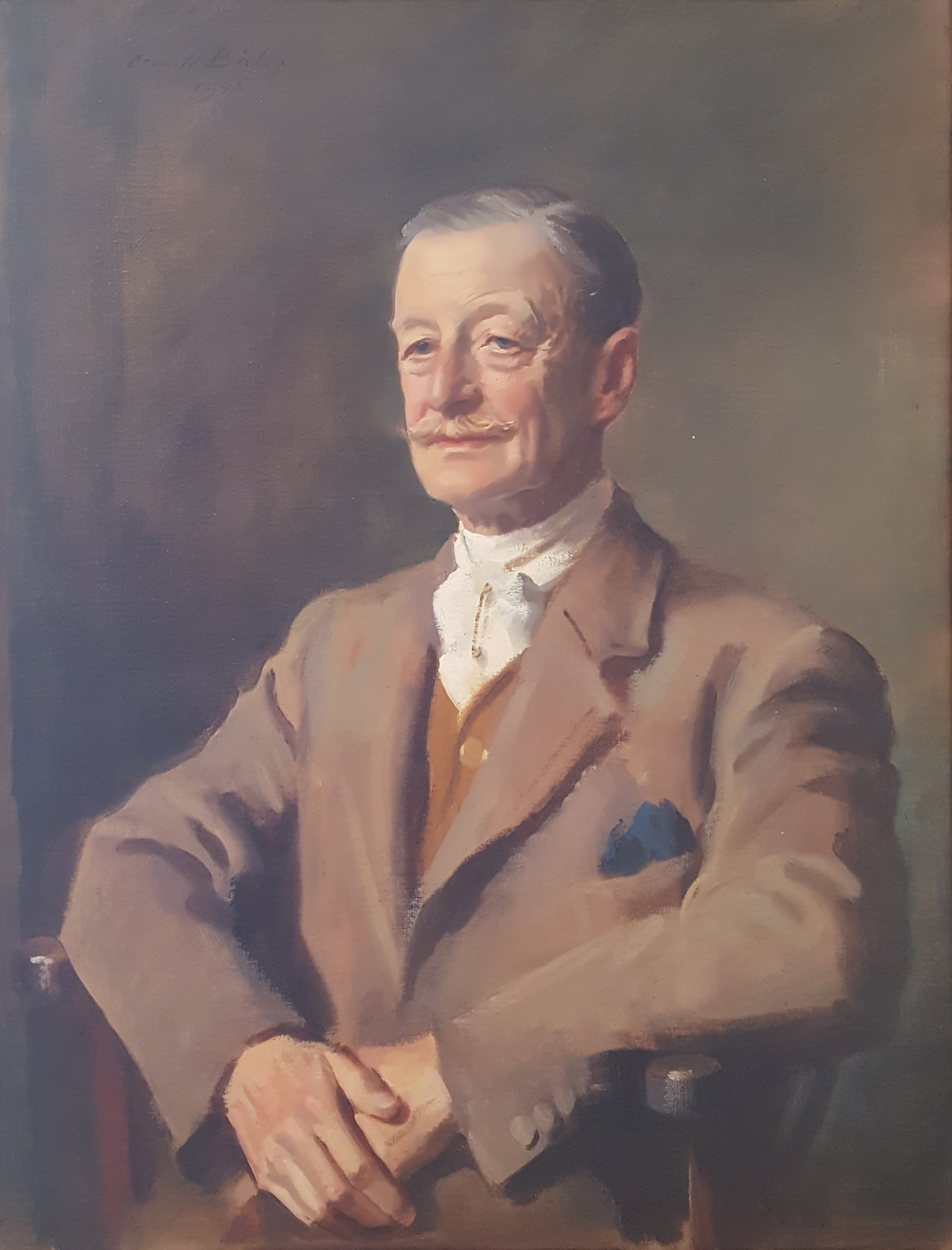
- Portrait of Acland-Troyte by Oswald Birley, 1945

Member of Parliament for Tiverton
- In office 29 October 1924 – 15 June 1945
- Preceded by: Francis Dyke Acland
- Succeeded by: Derick Heathcoat-Amory

Personal details
- Born: 4 September 1876
- Died: 27 April 1964 (aged 87)
- Resting place: All Saints Church, Huntsham
- Party: Conservative
- Spouse: Gwladys Quicke (m. 1909)
- Education: Eton College; Trinity College, Cambridge

Lieutenant-Colonel Sir Gilbert John Acland-Troyte, CMG, DSO, JP (4 September 1876 – 27 April 1964) of Huntsham Court, near Tiverton, Devon, was a British soldier and Conservative Party politician.

== Background ==
He was the third son of Colonel Charles Arthur William Troyte of Huntsham Court, by his wife Katherine Mary Walrond, daughter of Sir John Walrond, 1st Baronet of Bradfield House, Uffculme, Devon. Acland-Troyte was educated at Eton College and Trinity College, Cambridge. He inherited the family seat, Huntsham Court, following the early deaths of his two elder brothers.

== Career ==
=== Military ===
Acland-Troyte was commissioned as a 2nd Lieutenant in the 3rd Volunteer Battalion, Devonshire Regiment on 11 November 1896. He transferred to the regular army with appointment as second lieutenant in the 4th battalion, King's Royal Rifle Corps on 8 February 1899, and fought with his battalion in the Second Boer War one year later, where he was promoted to lieutenant on 25 January 1900, and was later dangerously wounded. He was with his regiment in Somaliland between 1903 and 1904 and was afterwards promoted to lieutenant. He rose to captain by 1905, for services to the Colonial Office.

During the First World War, Acland-Troyte was mentioned in despatches seven times. He was appointed Deputy Assistant Adjutant and Quartermaster-General in the beginning of 1915 and was promoted to major in September. In 1916 Acland-Troyte was appointed a Companion of the Distinguished Service Order and in 1917 was made a Companion of the Order of St Michael and St George (CMG). After the war he received the French Croix de Guerre in January 1919 and retired as brevet lieutenant-colonel a few months later. At the outbreak of the Second World War he was reactivated and in 1940 joined the Home Guard.

=== Political ===
Acland-Troyte contested unsuccessfully the parliamentary seat of Tiverton in a by-election in 1923 and in the following general election. He was however successful the next year and was elected MP for Tiverton in 1924, which seat he held until 1945.

=== Retirement ===
Following his retirement from politics he was knighted and in 1946 accepted the office of Master of the Tiverton Foxhounds which he fulfilled until 1950. He was a Justice of the Peace and alderman of Tiverton. In 1937 he was elected president of the Country Landowners Association, which post he left after two years.

== Marriage ==
On 12 October 1909 he married Gwladys Eleanor Quicke (d.1968), daughter of Ernest Henry Godolphin Quicke of Newton House, Newton St Cyres, Devon.

== Death ==
Acland-Troyte died in 1964. He is buried at All Saints' Church, Huntsham in Devon.

Parliament of the United Kingdom
Preceded by Francis Dyke Acland	Member of Parliament for Tiverton; 1924 – 1945	Succeeded by Derick Heathcoat Amory
