= The Stripping of the Altars =

Book by Eamon Duffy

- First edition cover
- Author: Eamon Duffy
- Language: English
- Subject: English Reformation; Medieval Catholic Church in England
- Publisher: Yale University Press
- Publication date: 1992 (First edition); 2005 (Second edition); 2022 (Third edition)
- Publication place: United Kingdom
- Media type: Print (Hardcover and paperback)
- Pages: 654
- ISBN: 0-300-06076-9 (First edition paperback, ISBN-10)

The Stripping of the Altars: Traditional Religion in England, 1400–1580 is a work of history covering late medieval Catholicism and the English Reformation, written by Eamon Duffy and published in 1992 by Yale University Press. It received the Longman-History Today Book of the Year Award.

== Summary of the book's argument ==
In the Preface to the second edition, Duffy says, "[t]he book was thus intended as a contribution towards a reassessment of the popularity and durability of late medieval religious attitudes and perceptions..."

While its title suggests a focus on iconoclasm, with an allusion to the ceremony of stripping the Altar of its ornaments in preparation for Good Friday, its concerns are broader, dealing with the shift in religious sensibilities in English society between 1400 and 1580. In particular, the book is concerned with establishing the religious beliefs and practices of English society in the century or so preceding the reign of Henry VIII.

Prior to the 1980s, academic consensus seemed to be that the English Reformation, where English Christianity shifted from Roman Catholicism to Protestantism, was a response to an immoral clergy and an ineffective institutional Church. Sometimes referred to as "the Whig version", this view held that prior to the Reformation, the English church was corrupt, full of superstition, and long-overdue for reform. This was the view presented by A. G. Dickens, whose 1964 English Reformation was, for many years the standard text on the subject.

The main thesis of Duffy's book is that Catholicism was in robust condition on the eve of the Reformation and that the general English population, possessing "a remarkable degree of imaginative homogeneity across the social spectrum", neither desired nor welcomed said Reformation. Duffy's argument was written as a counterpoint to the prevailing historical belief that the Catholic faith in England was a decaying force, theologically spent and unable to provide sufficient spiritual sustenance for the population at large.

=== Part I ===
Duffy's work contains an abundance of primary sources. Taking a broad range of evidence (accounts, wills, primers, memoirs, rood screens, stained glass, joke-books, graffiti, etc.), Duffy argues that every aspect of religious life prior to the Reformation was undertaken with well-meaning piety. Duffy focuses on how the liturgical calendar, with its fasts and festivals, shaped believers' "perception of the world and their place in it." Pre-Reformation Catholicism was, he argues, a deeply popular religion, practised by all sections of society, whether noble or peasant. A key point that Duffy makes, aiming to refute Jean Delumeau's contention on the matter, is that there was no substantial difference between the religious beliefs and practices of the educated classes (the clergy and the temporal elite) on the one hand and those of the wider populace on the other. Earlier historians' claims that English religious practice was becoming more individualised, with different strata of society having radically different religious lives, are contested by Duffy's insistence on the Catholic Church continuing to have a 'corporate' nature into the late medieval period and on Catholic Englishmen being conscious and willing members of the same institution regardless of social status.

=== Part II ===
The second part of Duffy's book concentrates on the accelerated implementation of Protestantism in the mid sixteenth century. It charts how society reacted to Henrician, Edwardian and Elizabethan reform and the changes in religious practice this entailed. Duffy uncovers a succession of records, notes and images that individually reveal an assortment of changes to liturgy and custom but taken together build up to demonstrate a colossal change in English religious practice.

The Reformation was a painful process for those who remained Catholic instead of converting to Protestantism. Even where they did convert, many Englishmen continued to hold a considerable affinity for the traditions of their earlier faith. Duffy vividly illustrates the confusion and disappointment felt by those stripped of their familiar spiritual nourishment as centuries of religious practice evaporated in the face of fierce centralist control. (One of Duffy's later studies, The Voices of Morebath, focuses on how the eponymous Devonshire village reacted to these changes.)

Duffy also uses the second section to highlight the brief flame of Catholic optimism which was ignited by the ascension of Mary I to the English throne in 1553 and her forceful reinstatement of Roman Catholicism at the institutional level, a flame that was soon extinguished by Mary's death in 1558 and the subsequent restoration of English Protestantism by her successor Elizabeth I. Ultimately however, the Marian reign is a secondary issue for Duffy's purposes.

David Siegenthaler, writing in the Anglican Theological Review said, "The importance of this book is that it affords opportunity to look broadly and comprehensively at the religious life of women and men before and after the separation from the Roman obedience and so take the measure of that life that in the continuum of English church history it can be noted and honored."

Duffy argues that the pre-Reformation Catholic Church was not as corrupt as some historians have believed. He also casts doubt on the belief that the Reformers performed valuable services by reviving a moribund church.

=== Prefaces to subsequent editions ===
For the second edition, released in 2005, Duffy wrote a Preface reflecting on recent developments in understanding the book's subject matter and on the book's reception, with this latter reflection including a response to certain criticisms of its contents. The third edition, released in 2022, adds a second Preface in which Duffy details how the book came to be and gives a further response to its critics:

How different all this (medieval religion) would look, I realized, if one were to consider the evidence of medieval lay and clerical commonplace books, liturgical and para-liturgical rituals, miracle stories, sacramental observances, processions, prayers and talismans so prominent in late medieval Christianity, not on the premise that they were a meaningless mound of mumbo-jumbo, culpably remote from the personality and teaching of Jesus, strong on magic, weak on personal responsibility but, instead, on the working assumption that they represented the ritual building-blocks of a coherent world-view that expressed itself not in individualist striving after personal authenticity, but in powerful symbolic gestures designed to shape and create community.

— Eamon Duffy

== Critical reception ==
Upon its publication, the book was hailed by many as an original and persuasive account of English Catholicism in the Late Middle Ages. Writing in The New York Review of Books, British historian Maurice Keen stated,

Perhaps it takes an Irishman to offer Englishmen (and others) a convincing picture of the religion of the ordinary lay people of England in the age before the Reformation. ...The evocation of [medieval Roman Catholicism,] that older, pre-Reformation tradition and of what its observances meant to the laity of its time is the theme of the first part of Dr. Duffy's deeply imaginative, movingly written, and splendidly illustrated study.

Catholic theologian Robert Ombres OP, writing in Moreana said, "Duffy's book is in every sense a substantial achievement. It is lengthy, carefully argued and researched..."

Others expressed a more ambivalent attitude. Writing in the London Review of Books, Susan Brigden praised the first part of the book as a "splendid achievement" despite occasional instances of "special pleading" in favor of late medieval Catholicism. Regarding the second half of the book covering the Reformation, however, Brigden was more critical: "with the advance of reform Duffy is hardly concerned. The power and, for many, the truth of the central doctrines of Protestantism are never admitted; nor are the spiritual doubts that assailed many Catholics."

In a review of the second edition, The Atlantic's literary editor, Benjamin Schwarz, called it

[A] vigorous and eloquent book, a work of daring revision and a masterpiece of the historical imagination.... At once meticulous and lush, The Stripping of the Altars patiently and systematically recovers the lost world of medieval English Catholicism. ...[W]hile the first two-thirds of this book is a deeply textured work of historical anthropology, the last third is a gripping narrative history, as Duffy traces the way the English Reformation (a process supported by a tiny minority, and deeply if ineffectively opposed by a population cowed by the new and crushing force of the monarchy) eradicated a thousand years of tradition and ritual. ... Duffy's most significant contribution by far is to elucidate the fragility of even deeply rooted ways of life: he convincingly demonstrates that for better or worse, the Reformation was "a great cultural hiatus, which had dug a ditch, deep and dividing, between the English people and their past"—a past that over merely three generations became a distant world, impossible for them to look back on as their own.

Unlike Schwarz, however, Episcopalian historian W. Brown Patterson found Duffy's narrative of the Reformation unconvincing, asking "If late medieval religion was as vigorous as Duffy maintains, why did the English Reformation occur? The answer he gives is that Henry VIII's breach with Rome was politically inspired and was aimed at resolving his matrimonial difficulties. But, if this was so, how and why did England become Protestant and, eventually Anglican?"

Historian David Aers judged the book an exercise in mythologizing. Duffy had, in the first part of the book, completely ignored political power and class, as well as the urban, aristocratic and monastic experience and the stifling effect of heresy laws: instead of providing a basis for "analysing change and conflict" it concentrates instead on "an accumulation of details." Aers claims that Duffy has proposed an absolute religious/cultural homogeneity that can be refuted by raising specific cases of people with different views, such as Lollards and Chaucer's characters; and that where it exists, such homogeneity would be better explained as fruits of political/legal antecedents, such as the stifling effect of De heretico comburendo. Aers prefers a history of the church and state attempting to "coerce homogeneity."

In contrast, historian Ronald Hutton saw the "marvellously human" book as part of a contemporary historiographical shift which "took religion seriously, in its own right, as a motivating force:" a "sensuous exploration" producing a vivid portrait. He summarizes the book as intending to show that initially "the English Reformation was unsought by, and unwelcome to, the majority of ordinary people" regardless of "prudent conformity" in the Edwardian period. Hutton praised the scholarship as deep and careful but cautioned it was a study limited by its scope and aims by a concentration on case-studies of particular "deeply conservative" parishes that were potentially unrepresentative; the book's arguments would have benefited with more consideration of broader unpublished sources and the research of certain other contemporary historians. Nevertheless, Hutton believed Duffy's overall case to be correct.
