= A. G. Dickens =

British academic

Arthur Geoffrey Dickens FBA (6 July 1910 – 31 July 2001) was an English historian, academic and author, notable for his contributions to history surrounding Tudor England and the Reformation.

== Early life ==
He was born in Hull, Yorkshire, on 6 July 1910, and educated at Hymers College and Magdalen College, Oxford.

== Second World War ==
He served during the Second World War in the Royal Artillery. From May to October 1945 he served with the military government in Lübeck, where he had to supervise and edit the local newspaper.

== Academic career ==
In 1949, Dickens was appointed professor of history at the University of Hull, later becoming deputy principal and dean of the Faculty of Arts, 1950–53, and pro-vice-chancellor, 1959–62. He took up the post of professor of history at King's College London in 1962, where he remained until becoming director of the Institute of Historical Research (IHR) and professor of history in the University of London, 1967–77. Dickens was also active in other bodies, including being president of the Ecclesiastical History Society, 1966–68; a member of the Advisory Council on Public Records, 1968–76; an advisor to the Council on the Export of Works of Art, 1968–76; secretary, chairman and general secretary of the British National Committee of Historical Sciences, 1967–79; foreign secretary of the British Academy, 1969–79; and vice-president of the British Record Society, 1978–80. Dickens enjoyed "a deep love affair with Germany", was a moving force in the establishment of the German Historical Institute in London and was decorated by the German government. He died in London at the age of 91.

His book on the English Reformation was, for many years the standard text on the subject, relying as it did on detailed examination of parish records.

He was elected a fellow of the British Academy in 1966.

== Death and legacy ==
Papers of Professor Dickens are held by Senate House Library, University of London, and are available to be consulted there.

== Selected publications ==
- Lübeck Diary. Victor Gollancz Ltd., London 1947
- The English Reformation, Batsford, 1964 ISBN 0-00-633064-9
- Lollards and Protestants in the Diocese of York, 1959
- Thomas Cromwell and the English Reformation, 1959
- Reformation and Society in Sixteenth Century Europe, 1966
- Martin Luther and the Reformation, 1967
- The Counter Reformation, 1968
- The German Nation and Martin Luther, 1974
- The Age of Humanism and Reformation, 1977
