= Eamon Duffy =

Irish historian (born 1947)

Eamon Duffy FSA FBA KSG
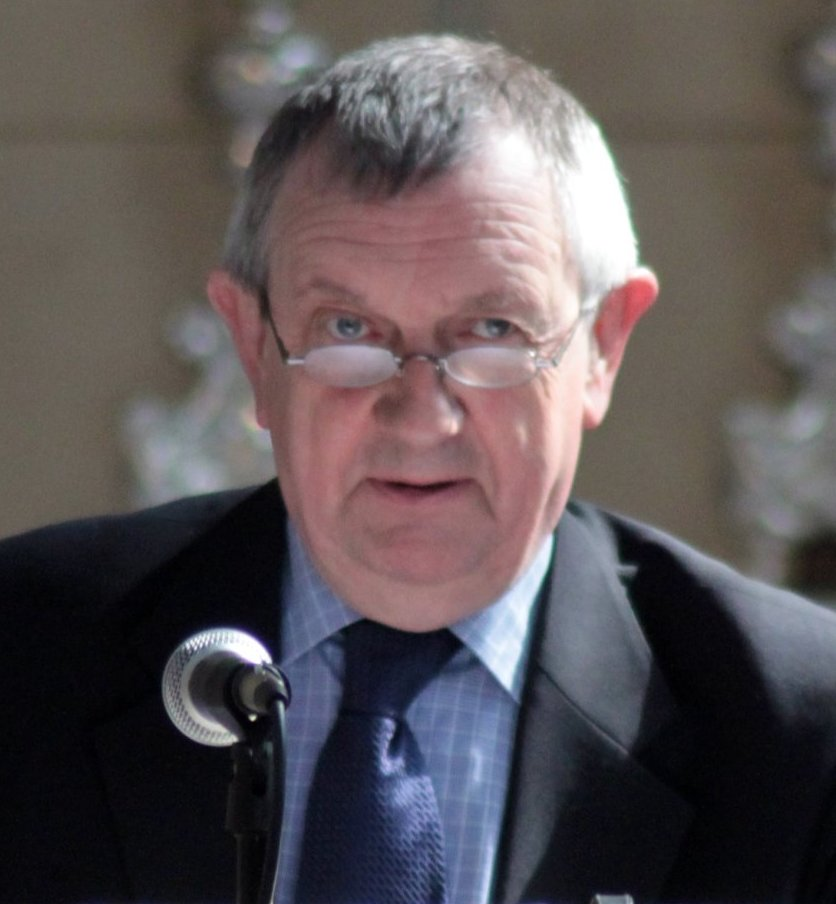
- Duffy in 2010
- Born: 9 February 1947 (age 79); Dundalk, Ireland

Academic background
- Education: University of Hull; University of Cambridge
- Doctoral advisor: Owen Chadwick; Gordon Rupp

Academic work
- Discipline: History
- Sub-discipline: History of Christianity
- Institutions: Magdalene College, Cambridge
- Doctoral students: Paul C. H. Lim
- Notable works: The Stripping of the Altars (1992); The Voices of Morebath (2001)

Eamon Duffy FSA FBA KSG (born 9 February 1947) is an Irish historian. He is the emeritus professor of the History of Christianity at the University of Cambridge, and a fellow and former president of Magdalene College.

== Early life ==
Duffy was born on 9 February 1947 in Dundalk, Ireland. He describes himself as a "cradle Catholic". He was educated at St Philip's School. After grade school, Duffy graduated from the University of Hull in 1968 with a BA plus honours, then from Selwyn College, Cambridge in 1972 with a PhD, dissertation titled Joseph Berington and the English Catholic Cisalpine movement 1772-1803. His doctoral advisers were Owen Chadwick and Gordon Rupp. Duffy then completed a DDiv at Cambridge in 1994.

== Academic career ==
Duffy specialises in 15th- to 17th-century religious history of Britain. He is also a former member of the Pontifical Historical Commission. His work has done much to overturn the popular image of late-medieval Catholicism in England as moribund, and instead presents it as a vibrant cultural force which needed a multi generational Long Reformation to reshape Britain into a Protestant society.

He was president of the Catholic Theological Association of Great Britain from 2002 to 2004.

On weekdays from 22 October to 2 November 2007, he presented the BBC Radio 4 series 10 Popes Who Shook the World – those popes featured were Peter, Leo I, Gregory I, Gregory VII, Innocent III, Paul III, Pius IX, Pius XII, John XXIII, and John Paul II.

Duffy moved to Magdalene College in the University of Cambridge in 1979, and was professor of the history of Christianity from 2003 to 2014. Since 2014 he has been emeritus professor. In 2004 he was elected as a fellow of the British Academy.

== Prizes and awards ==
- Longman–History Today Award for book of the year (1994): The Stripping of the Altars: Traditional Religion in England 1400–1580
- Hawthornden Prize for Literature (2002): The Voices of Morebath: Reformation and Rebellion in an English Village
- Honorary fellow, St Mary's College, Twickenham (2003). (He later resigned from the position in protest of management decisions at the college made by its principal, Philip Esler)
- President of the Ecclesiastical History Society (2004–2005)
- Honorary doctorates from the universities of Durham, Hull, and King's College London, the Pontifical Institute of Medieval Studies, Toronto, and the University of Notre Dame.
- Honorary Member of the Royal Irish Academy (2012)
- Honorary Canon, Ely Cathedral (2014)

== Works ==
=== Books ===
- Humanism, Reform and the Reformation: The Career of Bishop John Fisher (1989) (Editor; co-edited with Brendan Bradshaw) ISBN 0521340349
  - Transferred to digitally printed hardback in 2008, ISBN 978-0-521-34034-2
  - Transferred to paperback in 2008, ISBN 978-0-521-09966-0
- The Stripping of the Altars: Traditional Religion in England 1400 to 1580 (1992) ISBN 0-300-06076-9
  - Second edition issued in 2005, ISBN 9780300108286
  - Third edition issued in 2022, ISBN 9780300254419
- Saints and Sinners: A History of the Popes. (1997) ISBN 0-300-07332-1
  - Transferred to paperback in 1998, ISBN 0300077998
  - Second edition issued in 2002, ISBN 0300091656
  - Third edition issued in 2006, ISBN 0300115970
  - Fourth edition issued in 2014, ISBN 978-0300206128
- The Voices of Morebath: Reformation and Rebellion in an English Village (2001) ISBN 9780300091854
  - Transferred to paperback in 2003, ISBN 9780300098259
- "The Shock of Change: Continuity and Discontinuity in the Elizabethan Church of England", in Anglicanism and the Western Catholic Tradition (2003, edited by Stephen Platten) ISBN 1853115592
- Duffy, Eamon (2003). "The Long Reformation: Catholicism, Protestantism and the Multiformity of Reform". In Tyacke, Nicholas (ed.). England's Long Reformation: 1500–1800. London: Routledge. ISBN 9781135360948.
- Faith of Our Fathers: Reflections on Catholic Tradition (2004) ISBN 978-0826474797
  - Second edition issued in 2006, ISBN 978-0826476654
- Walking to Emmaus (2006) ISBN 978-0860124238
- Marking the Hours: English People and their Prayers 1240–1570 (2006) ISBN 9780300117141
  - Transferred to paperback in 2011, ISBN 9780300170580
- Fires of Faith: Catholic England Under Mary Tudor (2009) ISBN 978-0300152166
  - Transferred to paperback in 2010, ISBN 9780300168891
- Ten Popes Who Shook the World (2011) ISBN 978-0300176889
- Saints, Sacrilege and Sedition: Religion and Conflict in the Tudor Reformations (2012) ISBN 1441181172
  - Transferred to paperback in 2014, ISBN 9781472909176
- Reformation Divided: Catholics, Protestants, and the Conversion of England (2017) ISBN 9781472934369
- Royal Books and Holy Bones: Essays in Medieval Christianity (2018) ISBN 9781472953230
- John Henry Newman: A Very Brief History (2019) ISBN 978-0281078493
- A People's Tragedy: Studies in Reformation (2020) ISBN 978-1-4729-8385-5

=== Other ===
- "Eamon Duffy in Conversation with Raymond Friel", in The Hope That Is Within You (Audio CD, 2017)

Professional and academic associations
Preceded by Brenda Bolton	President of the Ecclesiastical History Society; 2004–2005	Succeeded by Averil Cameron
Awards
Preceded by Helen Simpson	Hawthornden Prize; 2002	Succeeded by William Fiennes
