= Alexander Gibbs =

Stained glass studio

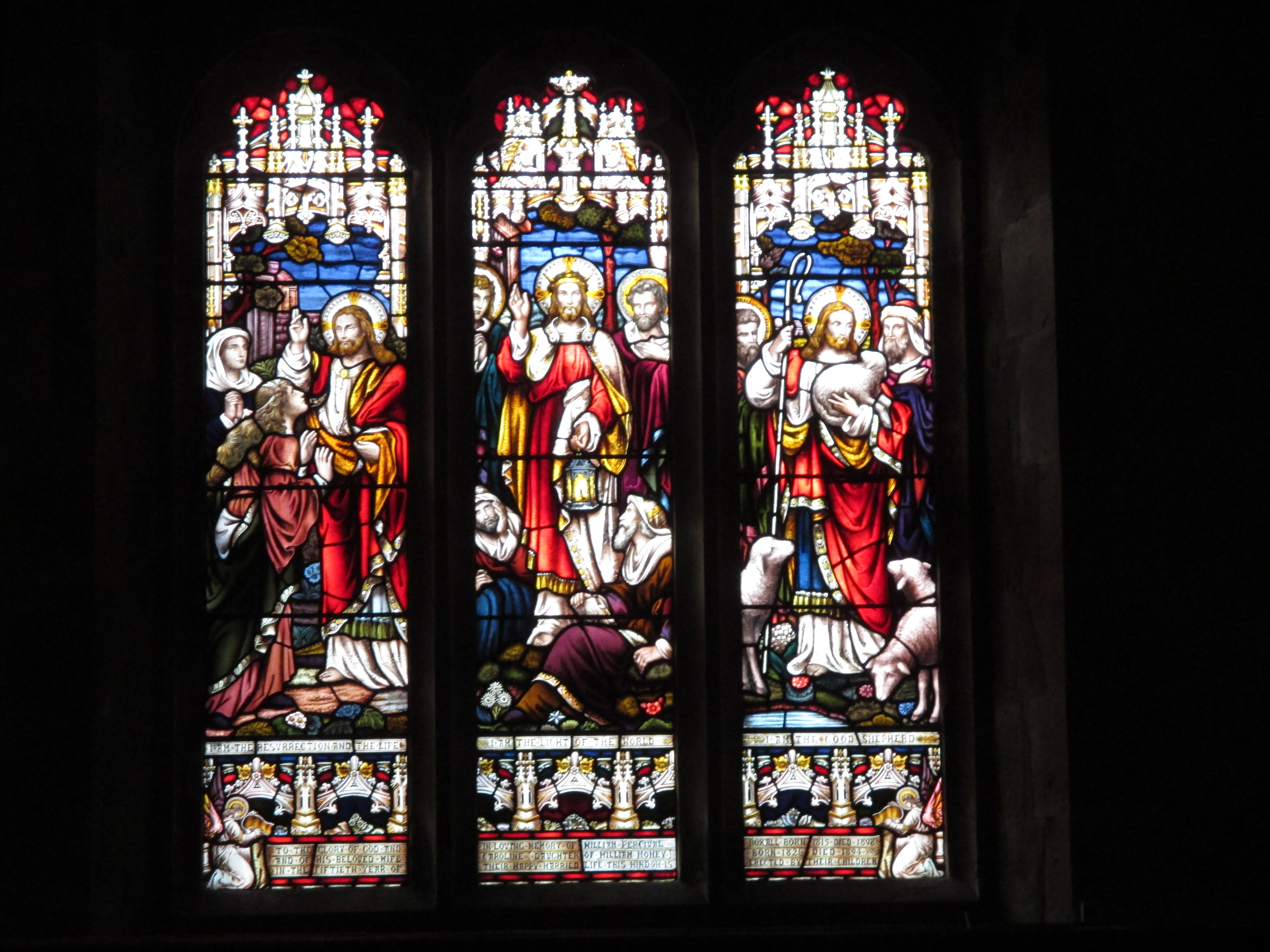
Stained glass from the Gibbs firm at St Peter's Church, Cowfold, West Sussex

Alexander Gibbs & Co. was a British stained glass studio founded in 1858 by Alexander Gibbs when he split off from the family firm founded by his father Isaac Alexander Gibbs in 1848. The studio continued until 1915. It was first located at 38 Bedford Square and moved in 1876 to Bloomsbury Street.

The east window in the Church of St Mary in Bideford in Devon is by Gibbs (1865). His windows in All Saints, Margaret Street (commissioned in 1877) are among his most elaborate surviving works.

== Notable works ==
- Church of St Mary, Bideford, Devon
- All Saints Church, Marylebone, Greater London
- St. Swithun's Church, Bintree, Norfolk

== See also ==
- British and Irish stained glass (1811–1918)
- Victorian Era
- Gothic Revival
