= Raleigh (Native American) =

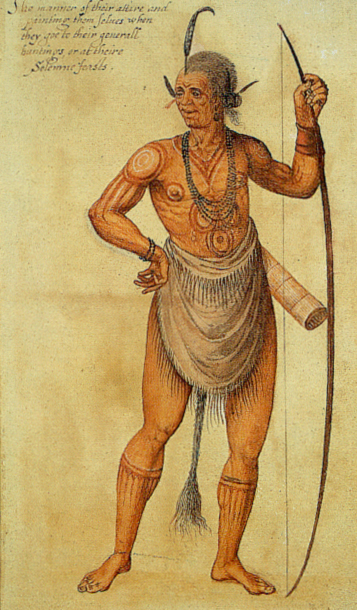
Warrior of the Secotan Indians in North Carolina (1585)

Raleigh (died 2 April 1589) was a Native American who was among the first to be brought to England from America in the late 16th-century. Living in the home of Sir Richard Grenville in Bideford, he was the first Native American on record to have a Christian conversion and an English burial site preceding Pocahontas.

Sir Richard Grenville captured the Roanoke Island Native American Raleigh (named for Grenville's cousin Sir Walter Raleigh) following a skirmish in 1586 and brought him to Bideford. He may have been one of three Native Americans who were captured, remaining in captivity after the two others escaped. Described as a "Wynganditoian", he had his baptism at Saint Mary's Church in Bideford on 27 March 1588.

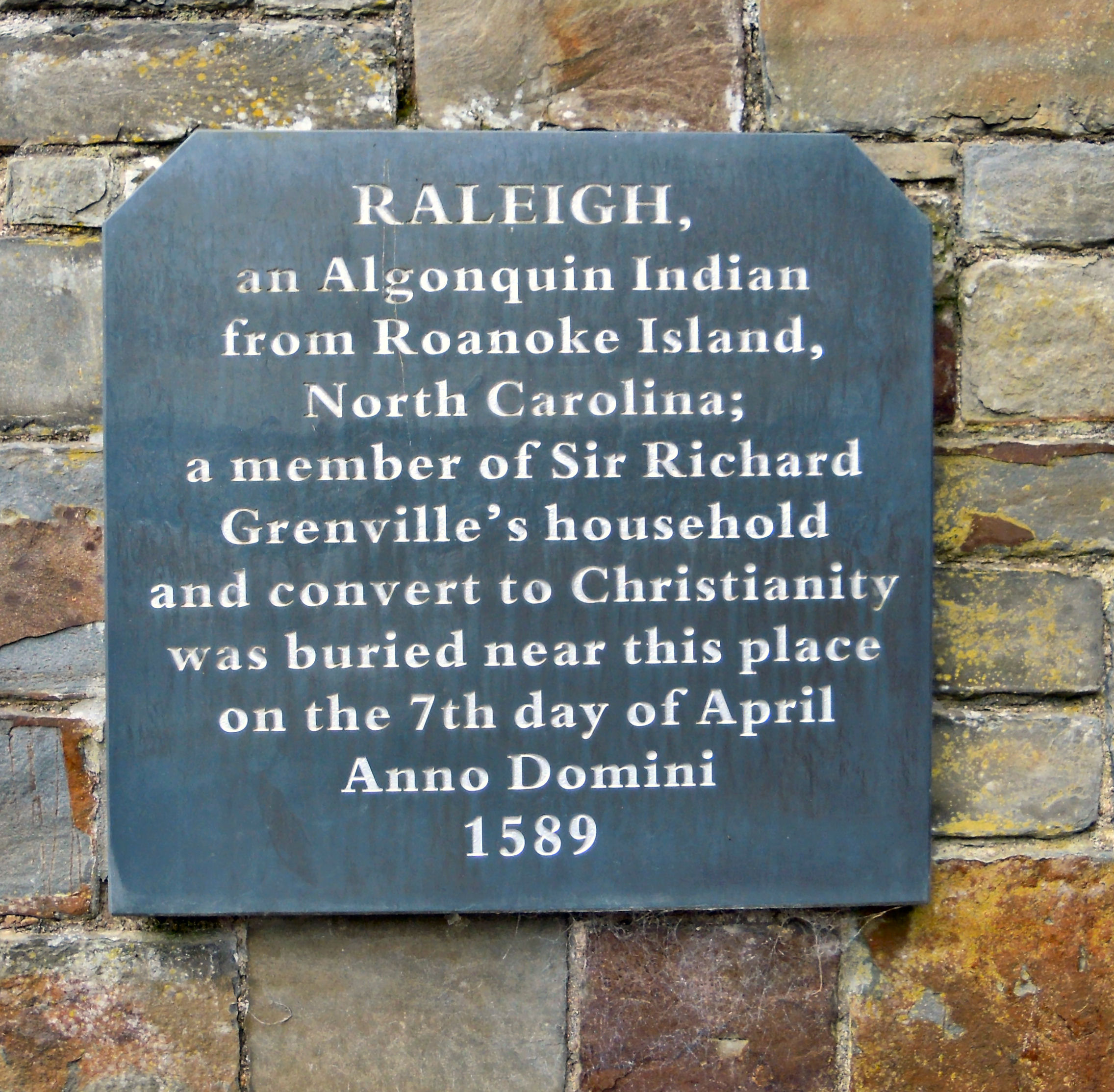
Commemorative plaque to Raleigh outside Saint Mary's Church in Bideford in 2018

Sir Walter Raleigh later corrected the place name Raleigh is said to have originated from, stating that "[W]hen some of my people asked the name of that Countrie one of the Savages answered Wingandacon, which is as much to say, as, you weare good clothes, or gay clothes." The mistake may have been corrected by Manteo. It is not likely that Raleigh was a member of the friendly Hatteras Indians led by Manteo but was probably a member of a tribe allied to Wanchese, who had been involved in several skirmishes with English colonists previously on Roanoke.

Little is known of Raleigh or why Grenville brought him to Bideford. Grenville was planning another voyage to America and it could have been his intention to take Raleigh back to Roanoke where his local knowledge and native language would have been useful. He died from influenza in Grenville's house on 2 April 1589, his interment in the churchyard of Saint Mary's Church in Bideford taking place five days later. Raleigh was the first Native American to legally have a Christian conversion and a resting place in England.

A record in the Bodleian Library at Oxford dated 1792 states that Raleigh was not buried in the church crypt, but in the Churchyard. As this record pre-dates the Victorian rebuilding of St Mary's church in the mid-1860s it is probable that his now unmarked grave lies somewhere there still.
