= Church of St Mary, Bideford =

Church in Devon, England

Coordinates: 51°00′59″N 4°12′21″W

Church of St Mary
- St Mary's Church in 2018

- Location within Devon
- OS grid reference: SS 45386 26423
- Location: Bideford, Devon
- Country: England
- Denomination: Church of England
- Website: stmaryschurchbideford.org

Architecture
- Functional status: active
- Heritage designation: Grade II*
- Architect: Edward Ashworth (rebuilt)
- Years built: 15th century (original); 1862–1865 (rebuilt)

Administration
- Diocese: Exeter

Clergy
- Rector: Reverend Claire Rose-Casemore

The Church of St Mary is the Anglican parish church for the town of Bideford in Devon, England. Built in 1865, it replaces a Norman church of 1260. The church has been Grade II* listed by Historic England since 1949 and comes under the Diocese of Exeter.

== History and design ==
The Norman font dates to 1080 and is still in use

The present church was built of stone rubble with limestone details by Edward Ashworth in 1862–5 to replace a Norman church of 1260 which in turn was built on the site of a Saxon church of cob and wattle which was standing at the time of the Norman Conquest. Various fittings and monuments were retained from the old church. The solidly built tower is from 1260 and is all that survives of the original building; it is finished with a battlemented parapet and holds a peal of eight bells, five of which were cast in 1722 and three in 1876. To the right of the tower is the town's War Memorial showing the names of those who died in the two World Wars.

The pulpit dates to 1894 and is of Devon marble

By the main entrance to the church can be found a holy water stoup of ancient but indeterminate date while nearby are records relating to Raleigh, one of the first Native Americans to be brought to England. He was the first Native American to have a Christian conversion and an English resting place.

The All Saints' Chapel sits on an area once reserved for the Mayor and Corporation of Bideford. The Votive Stand was commissioned by the Mothers' Union and was dedicated in 1999. Made from wrought iron in the shape of the baptismal font, it also resembles a signal beacon. On the altar can be seen a Memorial Book which was started in 2006. The glass screen which separates the chapel from the north aisle was engraved by Peter Tysoe and dedicated on Easter Day in 1982. The first three panels show Jesus being baptised by John the Baptist watched by the disciples - John with the book, James with the shell and Peter with the keys. The remaining panels show Mother Teresa of Calcutta, Archbishop Luwum of Uganda and Saint Boniface, Saint Anne the mother of Mary, and a Bideford fisherman with a Knight.

The nave looking East with its colourful display of hassocks

The nave is of 6-bay aisle-arcades with 4-centred arches. The baptismal font can be found on the east side of the north door and is a circular bowl carved from a massive piece of granite with eight panels - only three of which are carved. The font has been dated to about 1080 and is decorated with cables, possibly indicating the transitional period between Saxon and Norman. The stem is of a later date. Local legend says that Oliver Cromwell's troops threw the font out during the Civil War and used it as an animal trough. The screen at the base of the tower was made from bench ends which were salvaged when the Norman church was pulled down; it contains a good selection of early Tudor carving and the coat of arms of the famous local Grenville family.

The chest tomb of Sir Thomas Grenville (died 1513)

The pulpit dates to 1894 and is made of white marble veined with orange, green and red from Ashburton in south Devon and was carved by Devon craftsmen with attached columns and a figure of Christ. To the right of the altar is the chest tomb of Sir Thomas Grenville, who died in 1513. The Grenvilles were patrons of the living of Bideford for several centuries. The tomb is of quatrefoil panels carrying a recumbent figure in armour; it and the tracery surrounding it are in approximately the same position as they were in the Norman church. Inscribed on the Tudor arch above is the following Latin text:

Hic jacet Thomas Graynfyld miles patron(us) (huius) eccle(siae) q(ui) obiit XVIII die me(n)sis Marcii A(nno) D(omini) MCCCCCXIII cui(us) a(n)i(ma)e p(ro)piciet(ur) D(eus) Amen ("Here lies Thomas Grenville, knight, patron of this church who died on the 18th day of March in the Year of Our Lord 1513, to whose soul may God look on with favour Amen")

His recumbent effigy is shown fully armed in a suit of Almain rivets and his feet rest on a dog. His hair is of chin-length and his hands are clasped in prayer holding a ball shaped object, his heart according to Roger Granville, Rector of Bideford and the family's historian, who described the monument in detail in 1895.

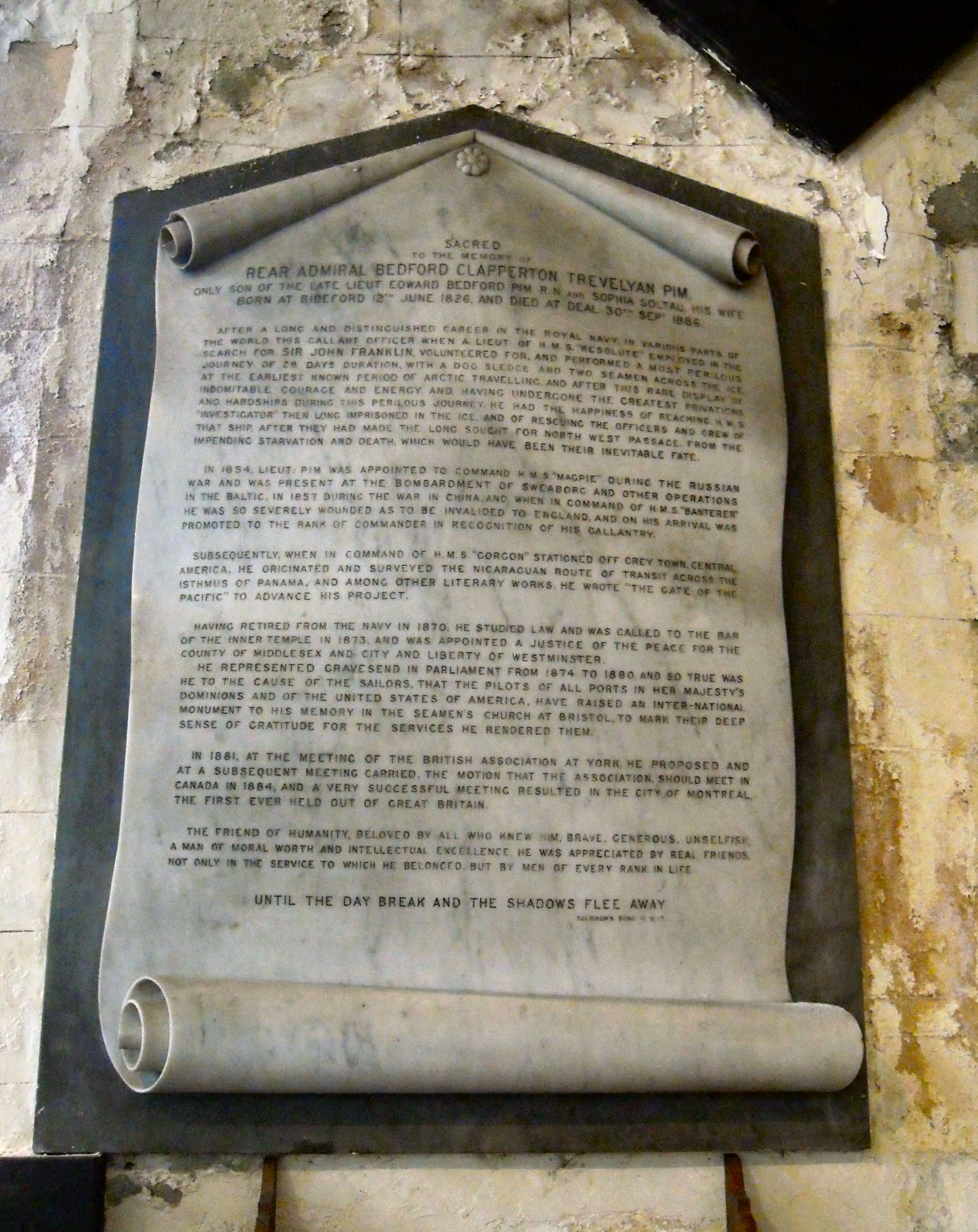
Wall memorial to the Arctic explorer and Royal Navy officer Admiral Bedford Clapperton Trevelyan Pim

Sir Thomas' great grandson was Captain of the Mary Rose which sank off Portsmouth in 1545. His great great grandson was Sir Richard Grenville who became a famous Elizabethan sailor, coloniser and administrator. As captain of the Revenge he died at the Battle of Flores (1591), fighting against overwhelming odds, and refusing to surrender his ship to the far more numerous Spanish.

During the Prayer Book Rebellion of 1549 an incident occurred in St Mary's churchyard when the Rev Richard Gilbert fell foul of Sir William Coffin of Routledge; the latter was riding by the church when he heard a heated altercation between Gilbert and a funeral cortège who had brought the coffin of a poor peasant to the churchyard for burial. The mourners explained to Coffin that Gilbert had refused to conduct the service until he received the deceased's best cow as payment for his fee. Sir William ordered Gilbert to conduct the service immediately and when he refused Coffin ordered the mourners to bury the priest alive in the newly dug grave. They seized Gilbert and bundled him into the hole and set to filling it with their shovels. When only his head was visible above the soil did they pay heed to the terrified Gilbert's shrieks for mercy and his promise that he would bury the old man without taking his fee.

On the church's south wall can be seen the funerary bust of John Strange, a local merchant and a benefactor of the town and church. Four times Mayor of Bideford, he died in 1646 of the plague which he contracted while helping other victims. To the right of the main entrance on the north wall can be found a large memorial to Admiral Bedford Clapperton Trevelyan Pim, a Royal Navy officer, Arctic explorer (during the search for the Franklin Expedition), barrister, and author. He was the first man to travel from a ship on the eastern side of the Northwest Passage to one on the western side. The stained-glass windows are all late 19th century and are of no artistic merit. The east window is by Alexander Gibbs (1865) while the north window is by Arthur J. Dix.

The organ is a three-manual instrument by "Father" Willis of Henry Willis & Sons of London and was installed in 1865 and refurbished in 1971. In a glass-topped display case nearby is a chained book published in 1567; a copy of Apology of the Church of England, it was commissioned by Elizabeth I from Bishop John Jewel to set out the principles of the Protestant faith. Copies were ordered to be chained in all churches in England and read from each Sunday. Bishop Jewel was educated at nearby Barnstaple.

== Gallery ==
The "Father Willis" organ of 1865

The doors beneath the tower are made from salvaged Tudor bench ends

The wall monument to John Strange (died of plague in 1646), four times Mayor of Bideford

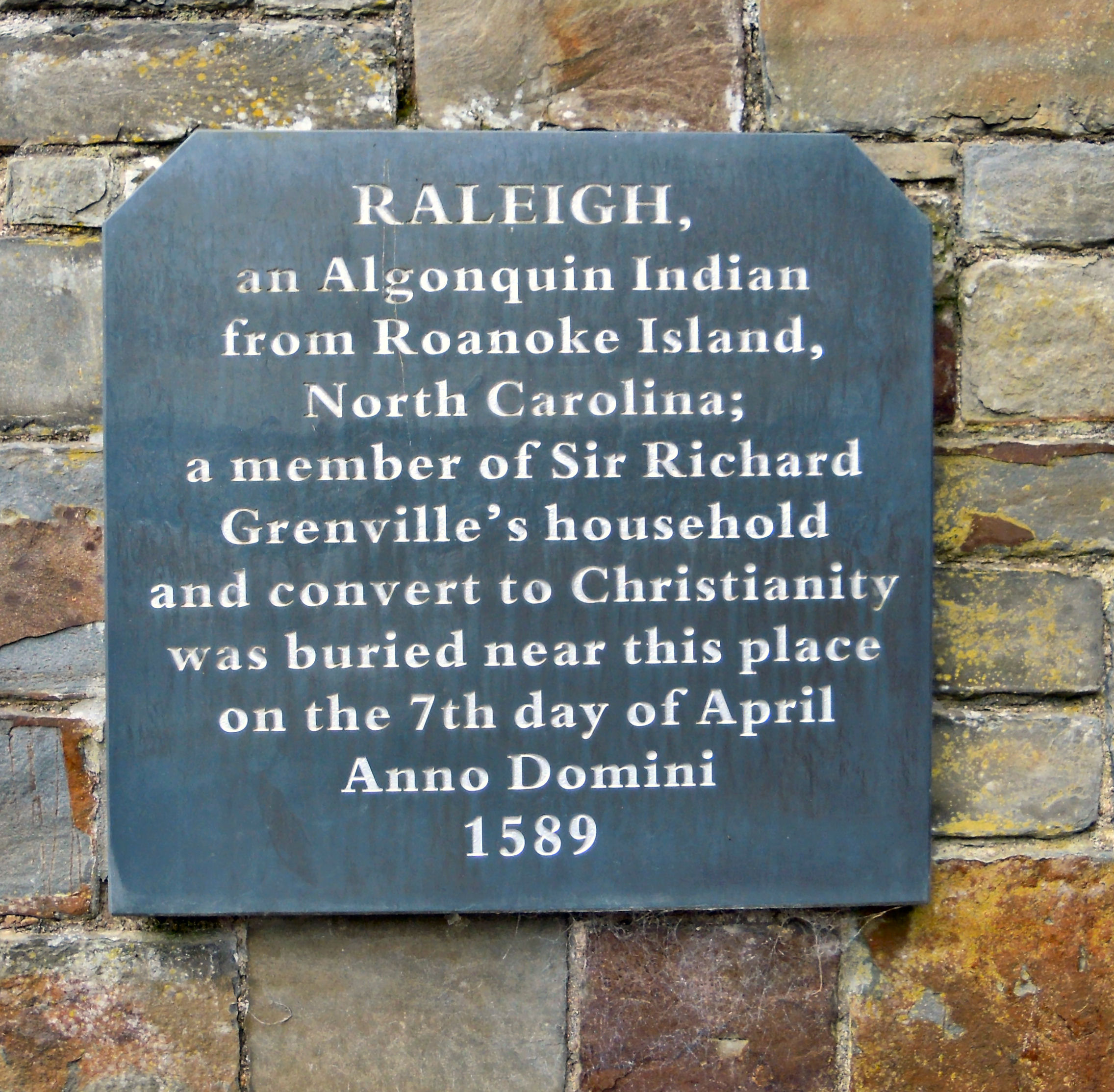
Commemorative plaque for Raleigh, a Native American who was buried in the churchyard on his death in 1589
