= Action off Bermuda (1585) =

Minor naval engagement off Bermuda during the Anglo–Spanish War

- Part of the Anglo–Spanish War
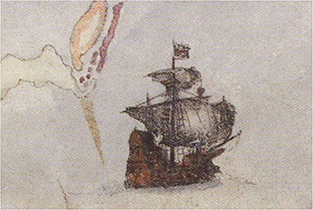
- English ship Tiger
Date	27–31 August 1585
Location	Off Bermuda, Atlantic Ocean
Result	English victory

Belligerents
England	Spain

Commanders and leaders
Richard Grenville	Alonzo de Cornieles

Strength
160-ton galleass: Tiger	300- to 400-ton galleon: Santa Maria de San Vicente

Casualties and losses
2 wounded	1 galleon captured 10 killed or wounded, 280 captured

The action off Bermuda, also known as Grenville's action off the Bermuda's, was a minor naval engagement that took place off the island of Bermuda over three days in late August 1585 during the Anglo–Spanish War between an English galleass, Tiger, and a larger Spanish galleon, Santa Maria de San Vicente. Tiger was victorious when the Spanish ship surrendered after a severe bombardment.

== Background ==
In April 1585, English Admiral Richard Grenville was in charge of a seven-strong fleet that brought English settlers to establish a military colony on Roanoke Island. This had been founded by Sir Walter Raleigh, off the Western coast of North America (modern-day North Carolina). War had already been declared by Philip II of Spain after the Treaty of Nonsuch in which Elizabeth I had offered her support to the Protestant Dutch rebels. In August the 160-ton English ship Tiger or Tyger of twenty two guns (which had been converted from a galleass) under Grenville began her voyage back to England from the 1585 Roanoke Expedition.

On 31 August 1585 the Tiger after only the seventh day of sail sighted a ship; upon closer inspection it turned out to be a Spanish ship, and eventually caught up with her.

== Battle ==
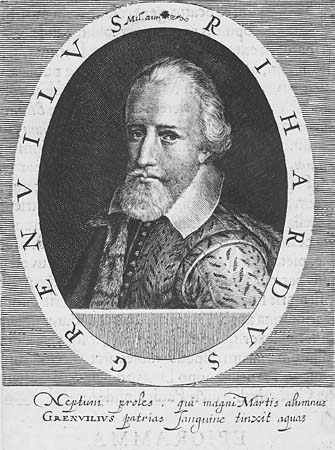
Sir Richard Grenville

The Spanish ship fired off a friendly salute, and as soon as the ship was in range, the Tiger opened fire. The Spanish ship was the Santa Maria de San Vicente, the flagship of the Santo Domingo squadron of the Spanish Flota, captained by Alonzo de Cornieles. At near 400 tons Santa Maria de San Vicente was a richly-laden galleon having sailed from Havana with nearly 300 crew, soldiers, and passengers. She was struggling to catch up with the main convoy of thirty ships much farther ahead, having been forced to heave-to by gale-force winds.

Grenville soon realised that the size of the Santa Maria de San Vicente was much larger (200 tons bigger) than his own ship. The Tiger sought to close and use her guns to pound the ship into submission rather than board, which was Grenville's initial strategy. Cannon fire from the Tiger soon found their target and sent shot firstly into the rigging of Santa Maria de San Vicente. She was hit by a number of broadsides from the Tiger, and a further shot holed her below the waterline. For three days the Santa Maria managed to put up with incessant attacks from Tiger but was unable to reply effectively as her guns were falling well short of the English vessel. Unable to tolerate the bombardment any more the Santa Maria de San Vicente turned around and attacked. She attempted to board, but the Tiger kept a good distance putting up stout resistance. The English ship, despite being outnumbered, was able to gain the upper hand by pounding the Spanish ship into submission.

Tiger began to have some sustained damage, and the English decided to act. With crates and sheathing from the Tiger, English sailors created a raft and used it to assault the Spanish ship. Cornieles seeing that he was in a desperate situation having already been holed and suffered heavy damage, then surrendered. The twenty men on the makeshift raft sank just as they landed on board.

The Spanish had suffered ten casualties in all, while the English had only two wounded. The Spanish prisoners were transferred to the Tiger, and the two ships travelled together, bound for England.

== Aftermath ==
On the journey home both ships endured high seas and storms - the prisoners were dropped off at the Azores islands under oath. The Santa Maria de San Vicente was taken into Bideford amid much rejoicing. Grenville officially valued the prize at 15,000 pounds, making the voyage a large profit. The capture was vital for underlining Grenville and Raleigh's case that colonization and exploration could be financed through privateering. Over 40,000 ducats worth of gold, silver, and pearls" along with cochineal, ginger, sugar, and ivory were discovered in the large hold. On the other hand, the Spanish estimated the value of the vessel at 50,000 pounds, and it was rumoured by some to have been worth as much as one million ducats. This spurred accusations against Grenville of embezzlement. Santa Maria was converted into a galleon known as the Galleon Dudley. Three years later both Tiger and the Galleon Dudley fought during the defeat of the Spanish Armada.

Pedro Diaz, a pilot of the Santa Maria de San Vicente, was kept as a prisoner by the English, who brought him along on the 1586 Roanoke Voyage, of which he kept a detailed journal which proved useful in knowledge of that expedition.

The cannons from Santa Maria de San Vicente were discovered by the quayside of Bideford in 1895. They were then placed in Bideford's Victoria Park only to be erroneously labelled 'Amada cannons'.
