= Richard Grenville =

English politician, soldier and explorer (1542–1591)

Sir Richard Grenville
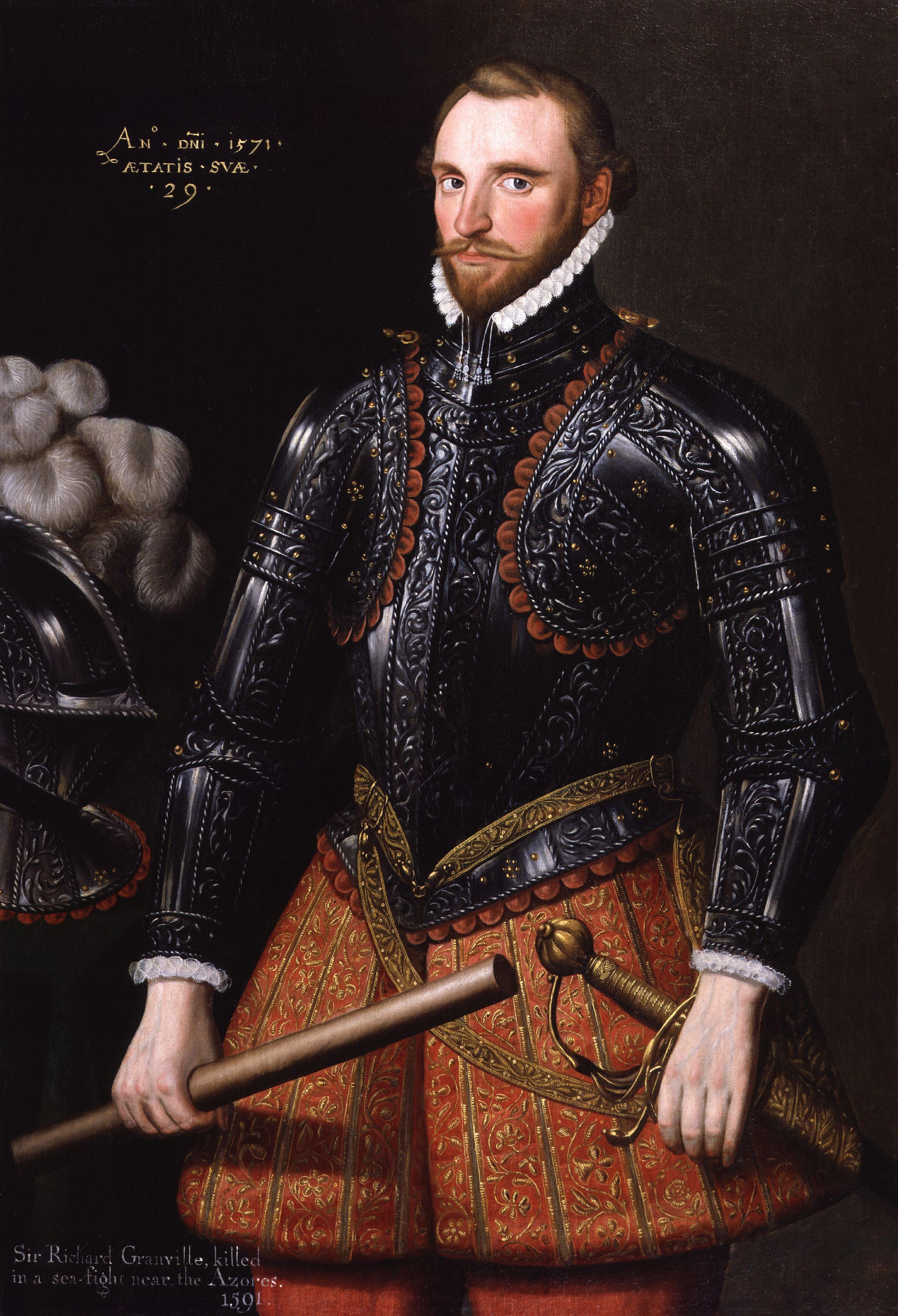
- Contemporary portrait of Sir Richard Grenville, inscribed: An(no) D(omi)ni 1571 aetatis suae 29 ("In the year of Our Lord 1571, of his age 29"). National Portrait Gallery, London.
- Born: 15 June 1542; Bideford, Devon, England
- Died: 10 September 1591 (aged 49); Flores, Azores Islands
- Other names: Greynvile, Greeneville, and Greenfield
- Spouse: Mary St Leger
- Relatives: Bernard Grenville (son)
- Military career
- Allegiance: Kingdom of England
- Branch: Royal Navy
- Rank: Admiral
- Commands: Revenge
- Conflicts: Second Desmond Rebellion; Anglo–Spanish War (1585); Battle of Gravelines; Battle of Flores (1591) †

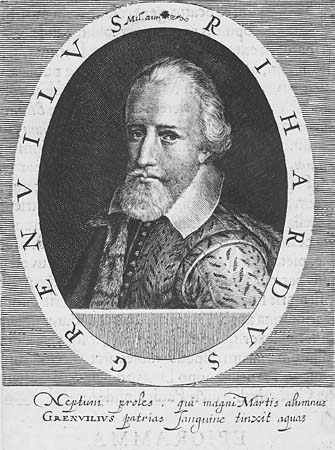
Richard Grenville, portrait in Heroologia Anglica, London, 1620, inscribed: Rihardus Grenvilus Neptuni proles qui magni Martis alumnus Grenvilius patrias sanguine tinxit aquas ("Richard Grenville, a scion of Neptune, nourished by Mars,... stained the waters with his blood"

Arms of Grenville: "Gules, three clarions or"

Sir Richard Grenville (b. 1542 – d. 1591), also spelt Greynvile, Greeneville, and Greenfield, was an English privateer and explorer. Grenville was lord of the manors of Stowe, Cornwall and Bideford, Devon. He subsequently participated in the plantations of Ireland specifically the Munster plantations, the English colonisation of the Americas and the repulse of the Spanish Armada.

Grenville also served as Member of Parliament for Cornwall twice, High Sheriff for County Cork and Sheriff of Cornwall. In 1591, Grenville died at the battle of Flores fighting against an overwhelmingly larger Spanish fleet near the Azores. He and his crew on board the galleon Revenge fought against the 53-strong Spanish fleet to allow the other English ships to escape. Grenville was the grandfather of Sir Bevil Grenville, a prominent military officer during the English Civil War.

== Origins ==
Richard Grenville was the eldest son and heir of Sir Roger Grenville (d. 1545), who was captain of Mary Rose when she sank in Portsmouth Harbour in 1545, by his wife Thomasine Cole, daughter of Thomas Cole of Slade. Thomasine remarried to Thomas Arundell. The ancient Grenville family were lords of the manors of Bideford in Devon and of Stowe, Kilkhampton in Cornwall. He was a cousin of Sir Walter Raleigh and the privateer and explorer Sir Humphrey Gilbert.

Grenville's birthplace is believed to have been at Bideford. His father (who had pre-deceased his own father Sir Richard Grenville (c. 1495–1550), the Member of Parliament (MP) for Cornwall in 1529) died when he was an infant, aged 3, and his mother remarried to Thomas Arundell of Clifton Arundell House, where Grenville spent much of his childhood. At age 17, Grenville began law studies at the Inner Temple.

== Early career ==
On 19 November 1562, aged 20, he was in an affray in the Strand in London in the company of his cousin, Nicholas Specott, gentleman, with Lewis Lloyd and Edward Horseman, their attendants. Upon encountering Sir Edmound Unton, Fulke Greville, Robert Bannister, gentleman, and Thomas Allen, yeoman, (with their servants), Grenville ran Robert Bannister through with his sword, then left him to die. Grenville and company were outlawed for three months and then pardoned for public duelling and manslaughter.

At age 21, he inherited his grandfather's estates at Stowe in Cornwall, and at Bideford and Buckland Abbey in Devon. About 1565, he married Mary St Leger, daughter of Sir John St Leger.

He was appointed High Sheriff of Cork in 1568.

== Military career ==
=== Hungarian campaign ===
In pursuit of his military career, with his West Country cousins, Godolphins, Carews, Killigrews, Champernownes, Basets, etc., Grenville fought against the Turks in Hungary for the Holy Roman Emperor, Maximilian in 1566. After petitioning Elizabeth I in 1565 to leave England for service abroad to a foreign prince, Grenville and his West Country cousins paid for and recruited a troop of West Countrymen to accompany them.

=== Colonisation in Ireland ===
In 1569, he arrived in Ireland with Sir Warham St Leger (c. 1525–1597) to arrange for settlement of lands in the Barony of Kerricurrihy. These had been mortgaged to St Leger by Gerald Fitzgerald, 15th Earl of Desmond. At about this time Grenville also seized lands for colonisation at Tracton, to the west of Cork harbour.

Sir Peter Carew had asserted his claim to lands in south Leinster. St Leger settled nearby, and Humphrey Gilbert pushed westward from Idrone along the Blackwater River. The plantations in the south of Ireland led to bitter disputes with local Irish nobility. They escalated into the first of the Desmond rebellions, led by James Fitzmaurice Fitzgerald.

As Sheriff of Cork, Grenville witnessed the rebellion in which Fitzmaurice, along with the Earl of Clancar, James Fitzedmund Fitzgerald (the Seneschal of Imokilly); Edmund Fitzgibbon (the White Knight); and others, attacked Tracton. They overcame the English defence with pickaxes and killed nearly the entire garrison. The three surviving English soldiers were hanged the next day by the Irish. Fitzmaurice threatened the imminent arrival of Spanish forces. Having plundered the citizenry of Cork, he boasted that he could also take the artillery of the city of Youghal.

In June 1569, soon after Grenville's sailing for England, Fitzmaurice camped outside the walls of Waterford and demanded that Grenville's wife and Lady St Leger be given over to him, along with all the English and all prisoners; the citizens refused. Fitzmaurice's troops massacred local English farmers in response. As Cork ran low on provisions, the people of Youghal expected an attack at any minute. The rebellion continued, but Grenville remained in England.

== Return to England ==
Grenville sided with the Earl of Arundel and the Duke of Norfolk in 1569 against the Queen's secretary. He was elected MP for Cornwall in 1571 and appointed High Sheriff of Cornwall for 1576. "Undeviatingly Protestant", he arrested the Catholic priest Cuthbert Mayne at the home of the Tregians in 1577. Mayne was martyred as a result.

=== Buckland Greynvile Abbey ===
In 1575–76, Sir Richard was back home at Bideford expanding his holdings, businesses and properties after his expedition plans were scuppered. He finished remodeling the rest of the interior of Buckland Greynvile Abbey into a suitable home for his growing family. He decorated it with navigational themes in the plaster on the ceilings, the Greynvile coat of arms on the mantle pieces, as well as a knight in repose against a tree.

=== Development of Bideford ===
Grenville played a major role in the transformation of the small fishing port of Bideford in north Devon into what became a significant trading port with the new American colonies, later specialising in tobacco importation. A charter had been granted to his ancestor Richard Grenville in 1272, creating the town's first council. Three centuries later, Grenville would seek a new charter for the town, hoping to develop it into a port that would trade with his estates in Munster. The charter was officially granted of 16 December 1572. Grenville would also revitalise the market and restore the town's fair.

In 1575, he created the port of Bideford. Grenville was never elected as Mayor of Bideford, preferring instead to support John Salterne in that role, but he was Lord of the Manor, a title held by the Grenvilles since 1126 and finally ceded by his descendants in 1711 to the town council he established. He was again elected as MP for Cornwall in 1584 (sitting until 1586).

== Development of Irish estate ==
Following a period of supporting Sir Walter Raleigh's venture in North America (see below) he returned to Munster to arrange the estate granted him under the plantation of the province. Following the suppression of the Second Desmond Rebellion in 1583, he had purchased some 24,000 acres (97 km^{2}) in Kinalmeaky and brought settlers over. His renewed efforts beginning in 1588 yielded little success, and Grenville returned to England late in 1590.

== Privateering plan and sailing around the world ==
In 1574, Grenville submitted a proposal to the Privy Council to take a single ship to attack Spanish treasure ships and establish English colonies in South America and from there to sail across the "South Sea" (i.e. Pacific Ocean) in hope of finding a short cut to the Spice Islands and terra australis incognita.

Supplication for a new navigation, permission to seek rich and unknown lands, to discover and annex all or any lands, islands, and countries beyond the Equinoxial, or where the Pole Antarctic hath any elevation above the horizon, such lands not being already possessed by any other Christian Prince. The planting of people and habitations in strange and unknown lands. Need not offend foreign powers or provoke war, provided no attempts were made to take from other civilised nations anything they already possess. Such expeditions should be composed of voluntary adventurers; but under patronage and benediction of the Crown; the leaders having authority from the Queen to require that obedience, quiet, unity, and order be maintained. Gilbert an m'self having pointed out to her Majesty that such undertakings would provide work and livelihood for many of her subjects; and also bring honour and strength to Your Majesty with immortal fame, ... besides great enrichment of Your Highness and your country, with increase and maintenance of the Navy.

The patent was initially granted, but was rescinded a year later on the grounds that England was still using diplomacy with Spain and had been at great pains to rebuild her relations with Philip II after the tensions of 1568–1571. It was these plans that were usurped and were eventually executed by Francis Drake when he circumnavigated the globe in 1577. This caused some bad blood and is the reason why Grenville refused to ever serve with Francis Drake in any capacity.

That same year Grenville received thanks of the Privy Council and the Earl of Bedford, then Lieutenant of Cornwall, in Ireland for raising troops against Sir Thomas Stukely, styling himself the Duke of Ireland.

== New World and Roanoke Colony ==
In 1585, Grenville was admiral of the seven-strong fleet that brought English settlers to establish a colony on Roanoke Island, off the coast of modern-day North Carolina in North America. Grenville and his fleet arrived at the village of Aquascogoc, inhabited by the Pamlico but, before leaving, Grenville furiously reacted to the disappearance of a silver drinking cup from the colony. Grenville and his men proceeded to sack and burn Aquascogoc.

Grenville was heavily criticised by Ralph Lane, general of the expedition, who referred to Grenville's "intolerable pride and insatiable ambition". Lane's remark was prompted by a bitter legal feud he then had with Grenville. On his return, Grenville captured a Spanish ship, Santa Maria de Vincente, which he later brought to Bideford to be converted into Galleon Dudley. The cannon from that Spanish ship are thought to be those erroneously labelled "Armada cannons" in Bideford's Victoria Park.

In 1586 Grenville returned to Roanoke to find that the surviving colonists had departed with Drake. Grenville left 15 of his own men to defend Raleigh's New World territory. During his return voyage to England, Grenville raided various towns in the Azores Islands. At about this time, a description was given of his behaviour while dining with Spanish captains:

He would carouse three or four glasses of wine, and in a bravery take the glasses between his teeth and crash them in pieces and swallow them down, so that often the blood ran out of his mouth without any harm at all unto him...

Grenville brought with him a Native American from Roanoke Island to Bideford after returning from the 1586 resupply trip. He named the Native American tribesman Raleigh after his cousin Sir Walter Raleigh. Raleigh converted to Christianity and had his baptism at Saint Mary the Virgin's Church in Bideford on 27 March 1588, but died from influenza while residing in Grenville's house on 2 April 1589. His interment was at the same church five days later along with Grenville's daughter, Rebecca.

== Spanish Armada ==
In 1587, Grenville was appointed Deputy Lieutenant of the West Country by the Privy Council, to organize the defences of Devon and Cornwall in preparation for the expected attack by the Spanish Armada the following year. Also was commissioned with overseeing the repair of the Fortifications of the Cinque Ports and Boscastle Harbour.

In 1588, he was made a member of the council that was created to devise means of defence against the Spanish armada. Grenville equipped seven ships at Bideford with supplies and more colonists for Raleigh's "Planters" Colony settled at Roanoke the previous year. However, a stay of shipping due to the impending arrival of the Spanish Armada meant that the fleet did not sail. Grenville led five of these ships to Plymouth to join the English defences and returned to Bideford where he provisioned the remaining two ships for Roanoke, a voyage that later turned back after being raided by the French. Later that year, Grenville was commissioned to keep watch at sea on the western approaches to the Bristol Channel in case of the return of the Spanish Armada.

== Command of Revenge and death ==
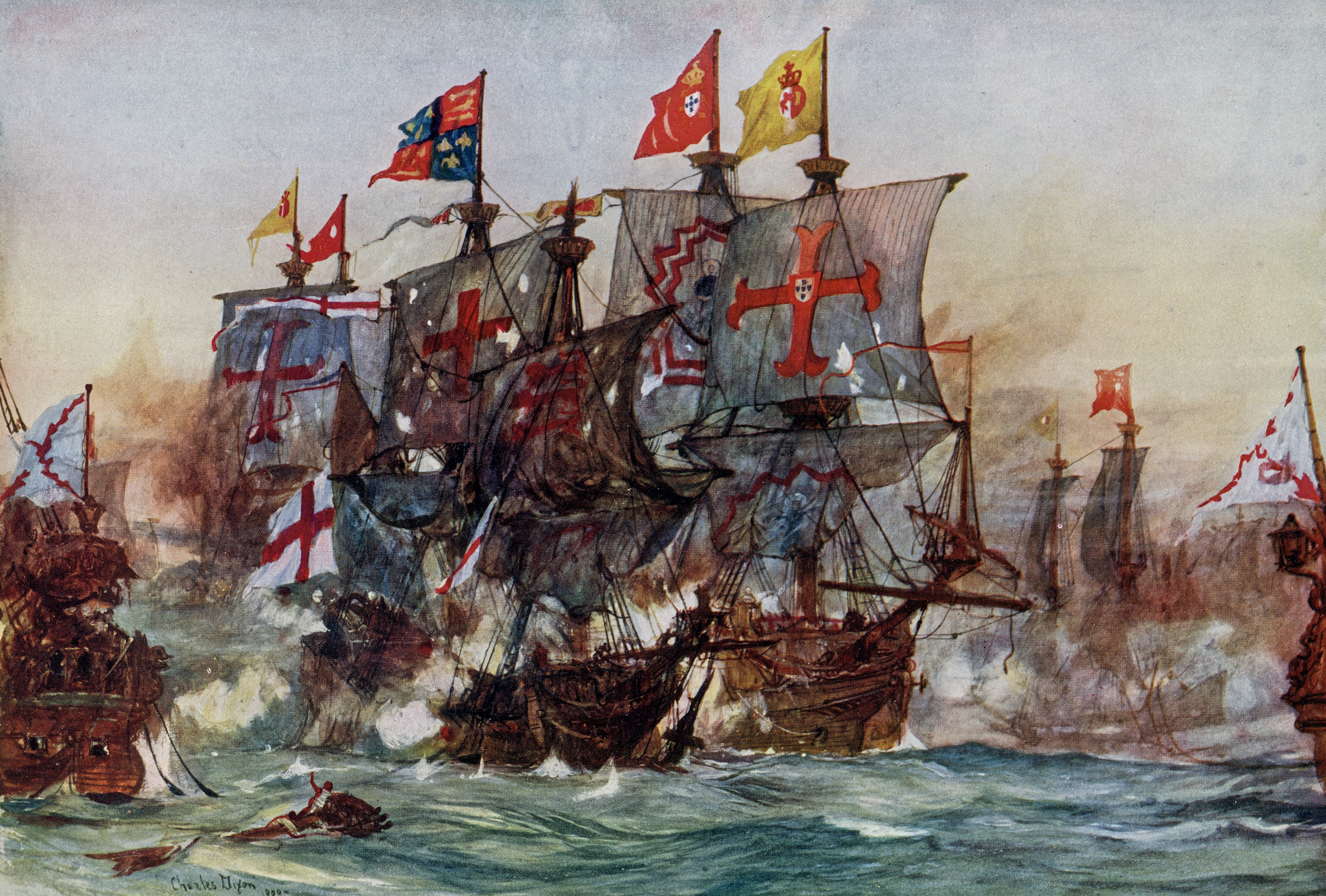
Grenville's defence of the Revenge at the Battle of Flores in 1591

Grenville was appointed Vice-Admiral of the Fleet under Thomas Howard. He was charged with maintaining a squadron at the Azores to await the return to Spain of the South American treasure fleets. He took command of Revenge, a galleon of new design that was faster and more maneuverable than older naval ships.

At Flores Island the English fleet was surprised by a much larger squadron sent by King Philip II of Spain. Howard retreated to safety, but Grenville faced the 53 enemy ships alone, leading his single ship in what amounted to a suicide mission, stating that he "utterly refused to turn from the enimie...he would rather chose to die than to dishonour himselfe". His crew was reduced by nearly 100 men due to sickness on shore, but he chose nonetheless to confront the far superior Spanish force. For twelve hours he and his crew fought off the Spanish, causing heavy damage to fifteen galleons. According to Raleigh's account, Grenville and his soldiers fought for hour after hour, "...until all the powder of The Revenge, to the last barrell, was now spent, all her pikes broken, fortie of her best men slain, and the most part of the rest hurt". The ship itself was "marvellous unsaverie, filled with bloud and bodies of deade and wounded men like a slaughter house".

The fight was later romanticised by the poet Alfred, Lord Tennyson in his work "The Revenge: A Ballad of the Fleet:" "Out-gunned, out-fought, and out-numbered fifty-three to one", Grenville was said to have wished to blow up his ship rather than give up the fight, as Tennyson wrote: "Sink me the ship, Master Gunner! – sink her! split her in twain! ... Fall into the hands of God, not into the hands of Spain!" Grenville's crew however refused to obey these suicidal orders and his officers surrendered what was left of their vessel to the Spanish, on a promise of fair treatment.

Grenville died of his wounds several days later, screaming that his men were "traitors and dogs", but the Spanish were not to enjoy their success, nor would Grenville's men survive their deliverance. The Spanish fleet was caught by a cyclone soon after and during a week-long storm Revenge and fifteen Spanish warships and merchant vessels were lost. Revenge sank with her mixed prize-crew of seventy Spaniards and English prisoners near the island of Terceira, at the approximate position 38°46′9″N 27°22′42″W.

== Marriage and children ==
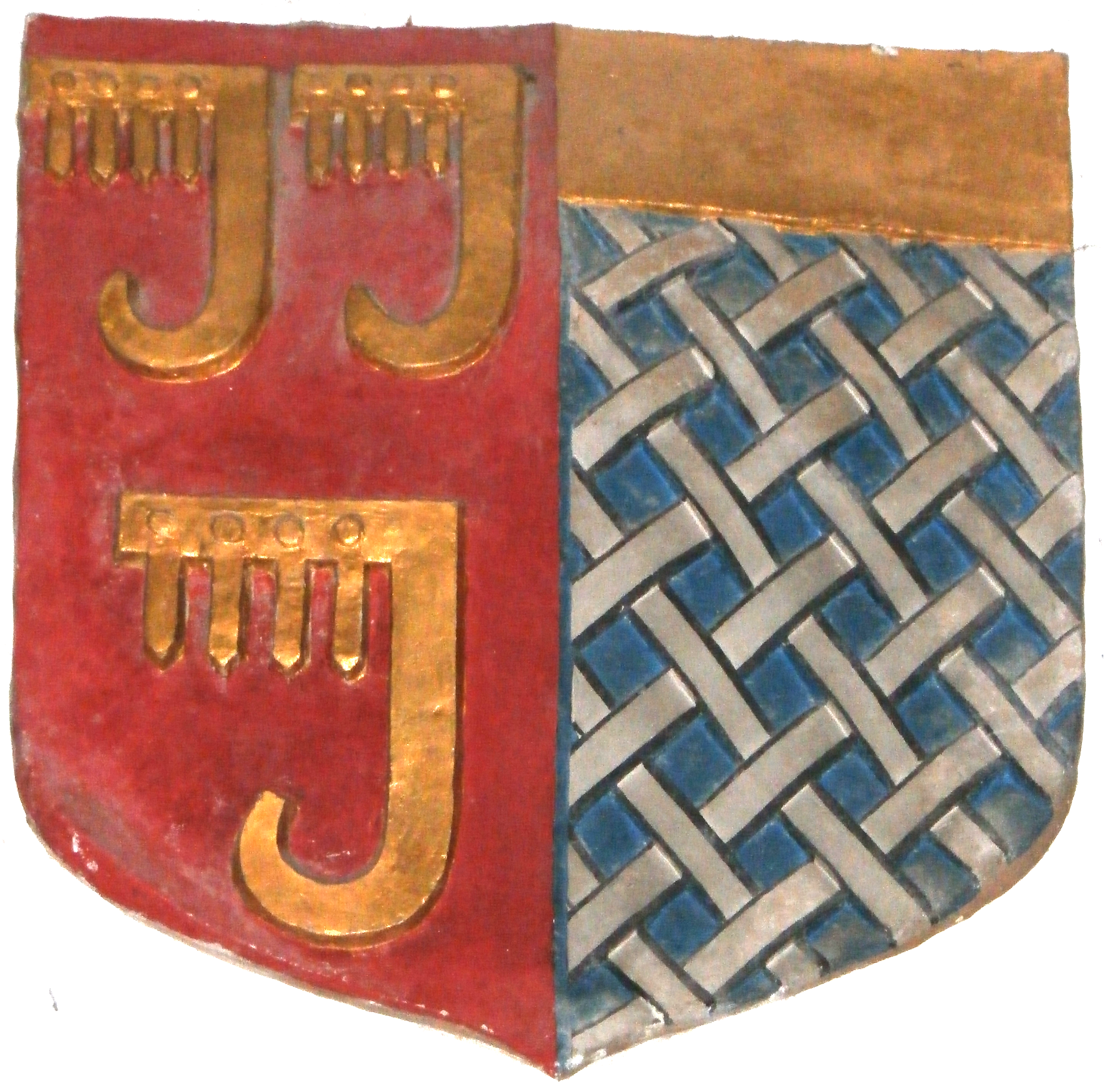
Arms of Richard Grenville (1542–1591) (Gules, three clarions or) impaling St Ledger (Azure fretty argent, a chief or), arms of his wife Mary St Ledger. Kilkhampton Church

In 1565 Grenville married Mary St Leger (c. 1543–1623), daughter of Sir John St Ledger of Annery, Monkleigh, near Bideford, and heir to her brother. She outlived her husband and died aged about 80 on 9 November 1623 and was buried at St Mary's Church, Bideford. The family initially lived at Buckland Abbey before moving to a newly built house at Bideford. They had four sons, including Bernard Grenville. Capt. George Vancouver was related to him on his mother's side. Her name was Bridget Berners.

== Legacy and honours ==
- Grenville's final battle on Revenge is commemorated in a poem by Alfred, Lord Tennyson ("The Revenge"). It was set for choir and orchestra by composer Charles Villiers Stanford ("The Revenge").
- A verse with reference to Richard Grenville by Martin Lluelyn (1616–1682) published in 1643 is inscribed on the 1714 mural monument in Kilkhampton Church in Cornwall of his grandson, the Civil War Royalist commander Sir Bevil Grenville (d. 1643), who was slain at the Battle of Lansdown:

Thus slain thy valiant Ancestor did ly
When his one bark a navy did defy
When now encompas't round the victor stood
And bath'd his pinnace in his co'quering blood
Till all his purple current dry'd and spent
He fell and made the waves his monument
Where shall ye next fam'd Granvill's ashes stand
Thy grand syre fills the seas and thou ye land

- One of the five houses of British public school Churcher's College in Hampshire is named after Grenville. There are also houses named after him at Dulwich College, Windlesham House School, Queen Elizabeth's High School, Devonport High School for Boys, Spratton Hall School Preparatory, Northamptonshire; Barnard Castle Preparatory School, County Durham, Sidmouth College and after his family at West Buckland School.
- Grenville College, the private school in Bideford, was named after Grenville. The school has since been combined with Edgehill College and renamed the Kingsley School.
- A British Sea Cadet Corps training ship, on land unit, T.S Grenville. One of the leading SCC units in the country at unarmed drill and holders of the longest unbroken national unarmed drill record.
- A Royal Canadian Sea Cadet Corp, 93 R.C.S.C.C. Grenville, is located in Kelowna, B.C., Canada.

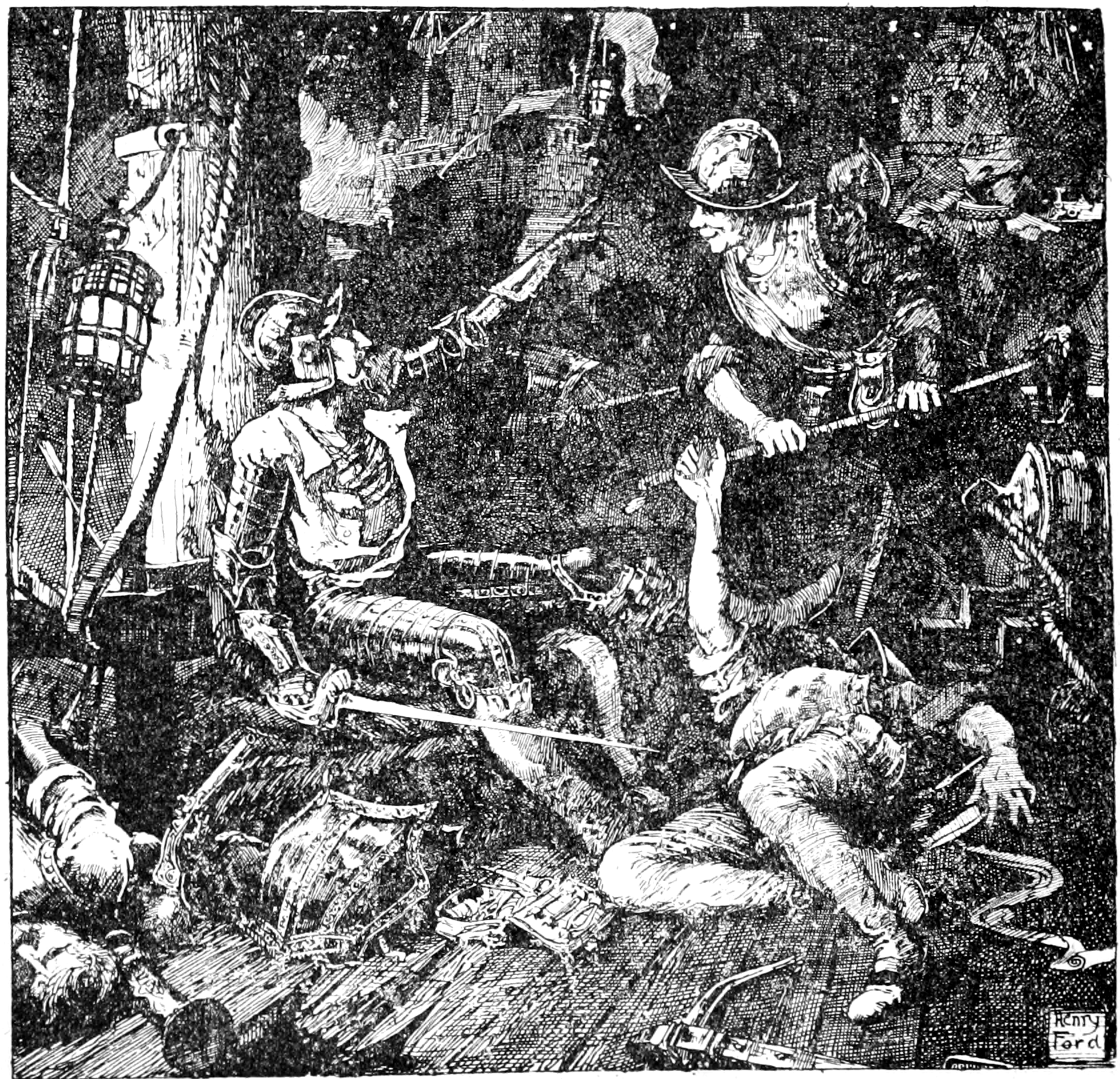
Grenville commanding his men to 'fight on!', illustration by H. J. Ford, 1899

== In literature and the arts ==
- Grenville's final action at Flores inspired the popular poem The Revenge: A Ballad of the Fleet by Lord Tennyson, which dramatically narrates the course of the engagement.
- Grenville's final battle on Revenge is mentioned in a poem by Robert E. Howard; ("Solomon Kane's Homecoming") from Fanciful Tales (1936). Howard mentions Grenville in several other Solomon Kane stories and poems, most prominently in "The Return of Sir Richard Grenville".
- Grenville is the subject of a 20th-century song by Al Stewart, "Lord Grenville," on Stewart's Year of the Cat album.
- Grenville appears as the godfather of the main character in Charles Kingsley's novel Westward Ho! (1855).

== Sources ==
- Vivian, Lt.Col. J.L. & Drake, Henry H., (Eds.), The Visitation of the County of Cornwall in the Year 1620, London, 1874: pedigree of Grenville pp. 84–87

Honorary titles
Preceded by Sir John Chamond	Custos Rotulorum of Cornwall; 1544–1550	Succeeded by Sir John Arundell
