= Bideford =

Town in Devon, England

Coordinates: 51.016°N 4.209°W

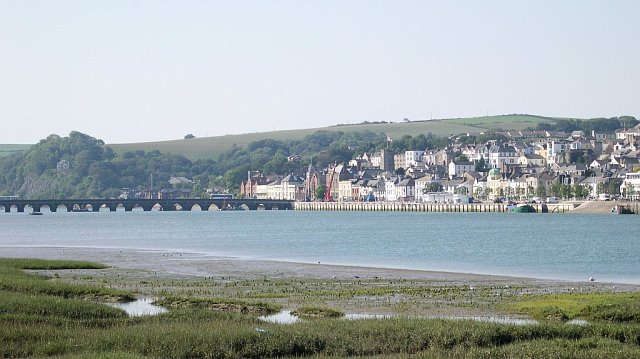
- Bideford viewed looking westward across the River Torridge. Bideford Long Bridge is visible on the left

- Coat of arms

- Location within Devon
- Population: 18,260 (2021 Census)
- OS grid reference: SS4426
- Civil parish: Bideford
- District: Torridge
- Shire county: Devon
- Region: South West
- Country: England
- Sovereign state: United Kingdom
- Post town: BIDEFORD
- Postcode district: EX39
- Dialling code: 01237
- Police: Devon and Cornwall
- Fire: Devon and Somerset
- Ambulance: South Western
- UK Parliament: Torridge and Tavistock

Bideford (/ˈbɪdəfərd/ BID-ə-fərd) is a historic port town on the estuary of the River Torridge in north Devon, South West England. It is the main town of the Torridge local government district.

== Toponymy ==
In ancient records Bideford is recorded as Bedeford, Byddyfrod, Bedyford, Bydeford, Bytheford and Biddeford. The etymology of the name means "by the ford", and records show that, before a bridge, there was a ford at Bideford where River Torridge is estuarine. At low tide, it is possible (but not advisable) to cross the river by wading on foot.

== History ==
=== Early history ===
Hubba the Dane was said to have attacked Devon in the area around Bideford near Northam or near Kenwith Castle, and was repelled either by Alfred the Great (849–899) or by the Saxon Earl of Devon.

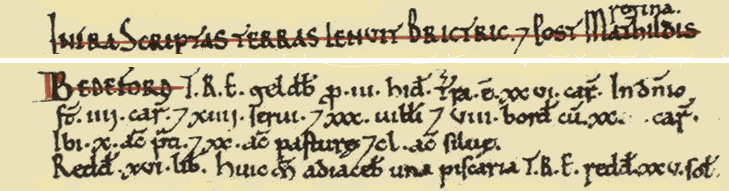
Domesday Book entry for Bedeford

The manor of Bideford was recorded in the Domesday Book of 1086 as held at some time in chief from William the Conqueror by the great Saxon nobleman Brictric, but later held by the king's wife Matilda of Flanders (c. 1031–1083). There were then 30 villagers, 8 smallholders and 14 slaves in Bideford, within the ancient hundred of Merton in Devon. According to the account by the Continuator of Wace and others, in his youth Brictric declined the romantic advances of Matilda and his great fiefdom was thereupon seized by her. Whatever the truth of the matter, years later, when she was acting as regent in England for William the Conqueror, she used her authority to confiscate Brictric's lands and threw him into prison, where he died. The Exon Domesday notes that Bideford and nearby Littleham were held at fee farm from the king by Gotshelm, a Devonshire tenant-in-chief of 28 manors and brother of Walter de Claville. Gotshelm's 28 manors descended to the Honour of Gloucester, as did most of Brictric's.

After the death of Matilda in 1083, Brictric's lands were granted by her eldest son King William Rufus (1087–1100) to Robert FitzHamon (died 1107), the conqueror of Glamorgan, whose daughter and sole heiress Maud (or Mabel) FitzHamon brought them to her husband Robert de Caen, 1st Earl of Gloucester (pre-1100 – 1147), an illegitimate son of Matilda's younger son King Henry I (reigned 1100–1135). Thus Brictric's fiefdom became the feudal barony of Gloucester. The Grenville family held Bideford for many centuries under the overlordship of the feudal barons of Gloucester, which barony was soon absorbed into the Crown, when they became tenants in chief.

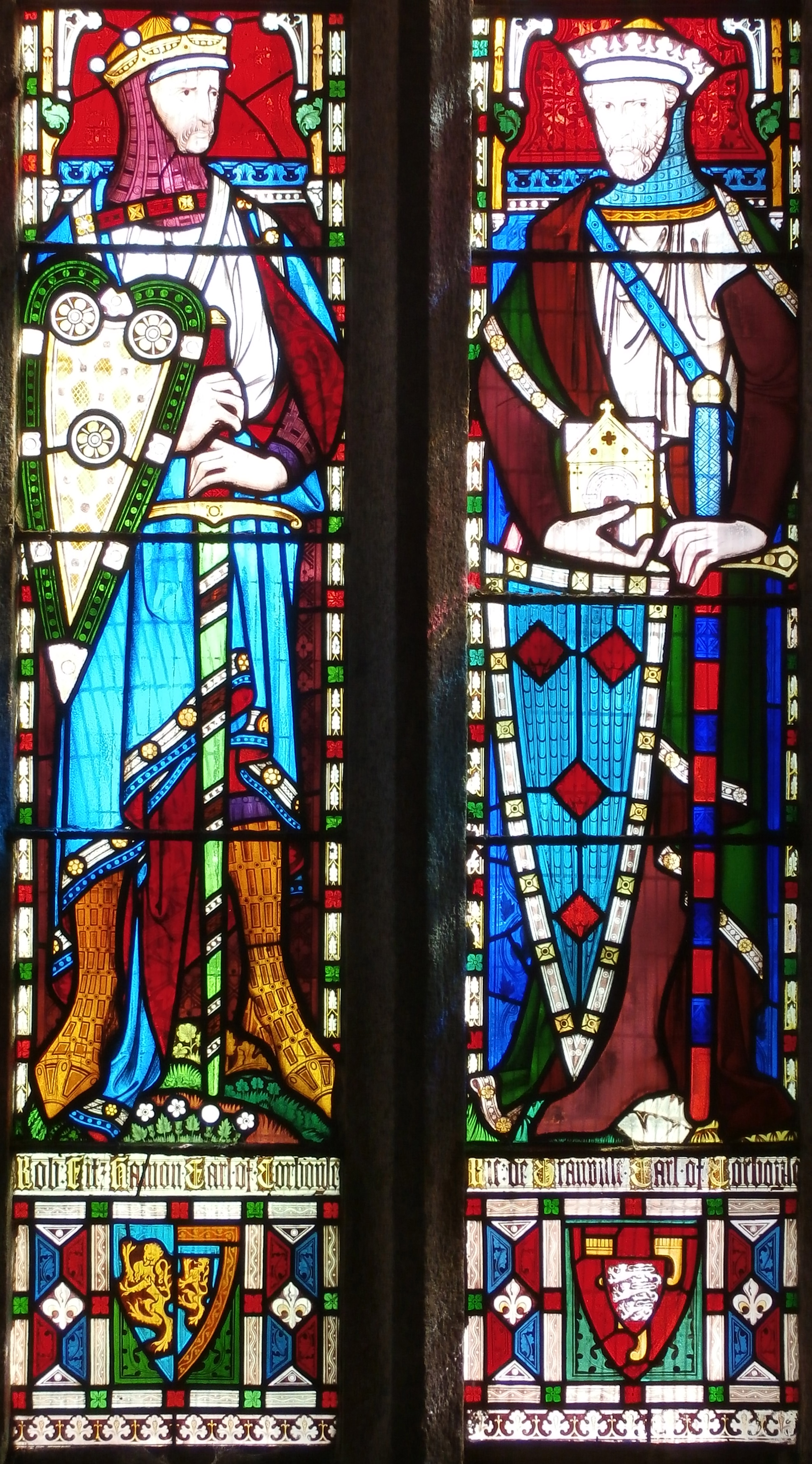
1860 imaginary depiction of Robert FitzHamon (died 1107) (left) and his younger brother Richard I de Grenville (d.post 1142) (right), Church of St James the Great, Kilkhampton, Cornwall

Arms of Grenville, as visible sculpted on the monument to Sir Thomas Grenville (died 1513) in St Mary's Church, Bideford: Gules, three clarions or. These are the canting arms of the de Clare family, Earls of Gloucester, heirs of FitzHamon and overlords of the Grenvilles

Sir Richard I de Grenville (d. after 1142) (alias de Grainvilla, de Greinvill, etc.) was one of the Twelve Knights of Glamorgan who served in the Norman Conquest of Glamorgan under his elder brother Robert FitzHamon (died 1107), the first Norman feudal baron of Gloucester and Lord of Glamorgan from 1075. He obtained from FitzHamon the lordship of Neath, Glamorgan, where he built Neath Castle and in 1129 founded Neath Abbey. Richard de Grenville was one of three (or four) known sons of Hamo Dapifer (died around 1100) Sheriff of Kent, an Anglo-Norman royal official under both King William the Conqueror (1066–1087) and his son King William Rufus (1087–1100). He is by tradition the founder and ancestor of the prominent Westcountry Grenville family of Stowe in the parish of Kilkhampton in Cornwall and of Bideford in Devon.

By tradition Richard de Grenville is said by Prince (died 1723), (apparently following Fuller's Worthies) to have founded Neath Abbey and bestowed upon it all his military acquisitions for its maintenance, and to have

"returned to his patrimony at Bideford where he lived in great honour and reputation the rest of his days".

However, according to Round (died 1928) "no proof exists that Richard I de Grenville ever held the manor of Bideford, which was later one of the principal seats of the West Country Grenville family. It was however certainly one of the constituent manors of the Honour of Gloucester granted by King William Rufus to Robert FitzHamon." Richard de Grenville is known to have held seven knight's fees from the Honour of Gloucester, granted to him either by his brother FitzHamon or by the latter's son-in-law and heir Robert, 1st Earl of Gloucester (1100–1147). Round supposes instead that the Grenvilles of Bideford and Stowe were descended from a certain "Robert de Grenville" (alias de Grainville, de Grainavilla, etc.) who was a junior witness to Richard's foundation charter of Neath Abbey, and who in the 1166 Cartae Baronum return was listed as holding one knight's fee from the Earl of Gloucester, feudal baron of Gloucester. Robert's familial relationship, if any, to Richard is unknown.

A charter was granted in 1272 to Richard V de Grenville by King Henry III, which created the town's first council. In ancient records Bideford was recorded as a borough; but it only returned members to Parliament during the reigns of Edward I (1272–1307) and Edward II (1307–1327).

=== 1500–1700 ===
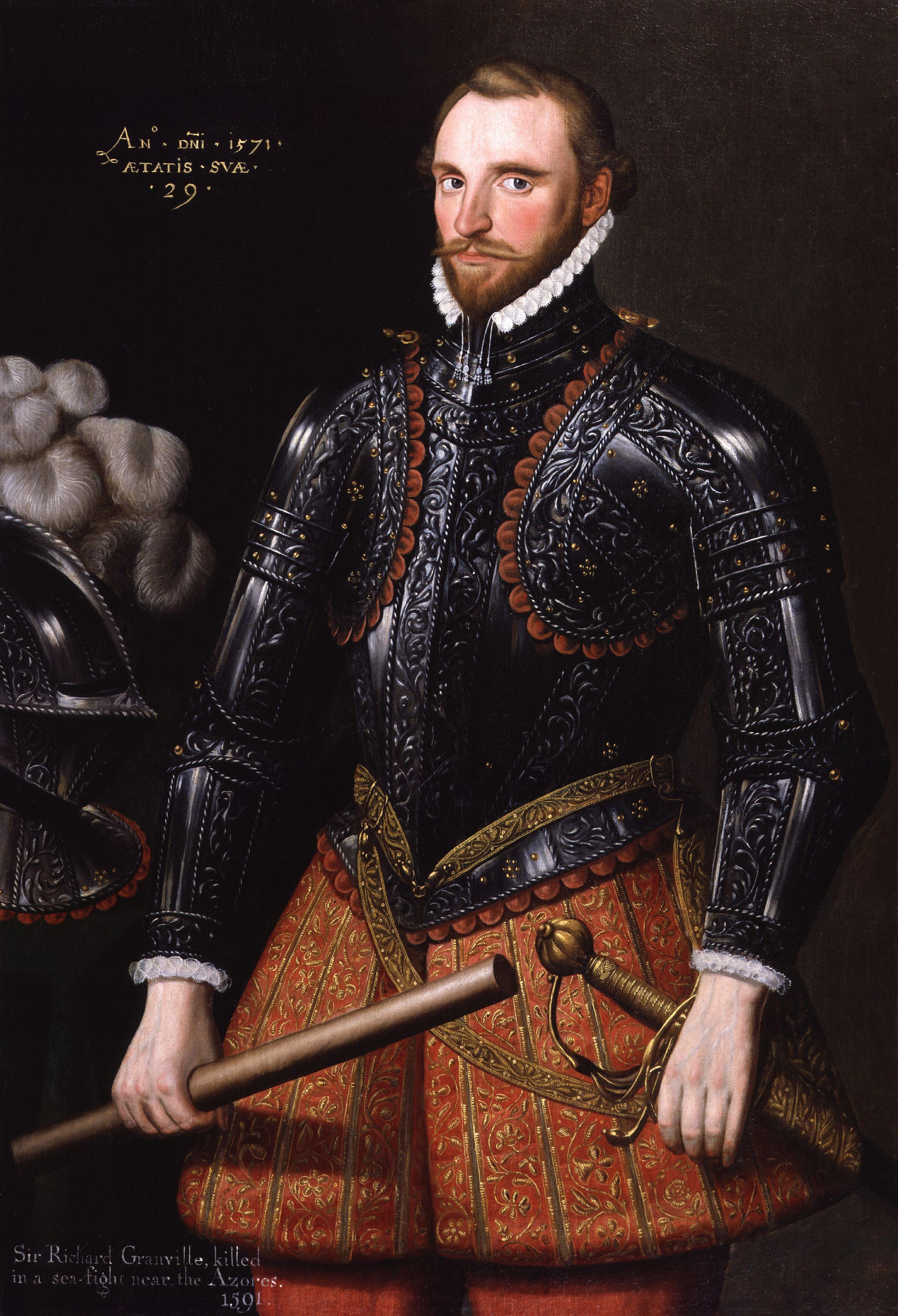
A portrait of Sir Richard Grenville (1542–1591) heroic captain of the Revenge

The Grenville family were for many centuries lords of the manor of Bideford and played a major role in the town's development. The monument with an effigy of Sir Thomas Grenville (died 1513) exists in St Mary's Church. His great-great-grandson Sir Richard Grenville (1542–1591), the captain of the Revenge, was born in the manor house in Bideford, formerly situated on the site of numbers 1–3 Bridge Street. He built himself a new mansion on the quayside in 1585. The family had another seat at Stow House, Kilkhampton, near Bude in Cornwall. Grenville played a major role in the transformation of the small fishing port of Bideford in North Devon into what became a significant trading port with the new American colonies, later specialising in tobacco importation. In 1575 he created the Port of Bideford. Grenville was never elected as Mayor of Bideford, preferring instead to support John Salterne in that role, but he was Lord of the Manor, a title held by the Grenvilles since 1126 and finally ceded by his descendants in 1711 to the Town Council he established. On his return from Roanoke Colony Grenville's ship Tiger captured a Spanish galleon the Santa Maria de San Vicente off Bermuda in late August 1585. The Spanish prize was brought into Bideford with riches valued at around 15,000 pounds. Grenville also brought a Native American "Wynganditoian" from Roanoke Island with him after returning from a voyage to America in 1586. Grenville named this Native American tribesman Raleigh after his cousin Sir Walter Raleigh. Raleigh converted to Christianity and was baptised at Saint Mary's Church on 27 March 1588, but died from influenza during his residence in Grenville's house on 2 April 1589. His interment was at the same church five days later. Sir Richard Grenville's great-grandson, Sir John Granville, helped restore Charles II to the throne, and in 1661 Charles made Sir John Granville Baron Granville of Bideford and Earl of Bath.

During the English Civil War, Bideford stood with the Parliamentarians against the Royalist forces of Charles I. Following a series of Royalist successes in the South West during 1643, the Parliamentarians withdrew into Bideford and its two small fortresses, one of which was Chudleigh Fort. Here they were besieged. After further Royalist victories it became clear that Bideford would not be relieved, and in August 1643 it was stormed by Royalist forces. Following fierce fighting around the two forts, the town fell.

In 1646, 229 people in the town were killed by the plague. It was suggested that a Spanish vessel laden with wool which docked at the quay may have brought this plague to Bideford, and that it was children playing with the wool who first got infected with the plague. Victims were buried from 8 June 1646 to 18 January the next year. After the revocation of the Edict of Nantes and the expulsion of French Protestants from France a considerable number of them immigrated to Bideford, and they brought a lot of new trades to the town, including silk weaving.

In the 16th century the merchant and ship owner John Strange was born in the town. When he was in his youth, he fell from a cliff yet did not suffer any injury, then later on in his life someone fired an arrow at his forehead, but it did not penetrate his skull, and the only lasting damage was a scar. Once a malicious person tried to throw him over the Long Bridge, the walls of the bridge being very low, but was unexpectedly and luckily interrupted.

==== Witch trial ====
The Bideford witch trial in 1682 involved three women, Temperance Lloyd, Mary Trembles and Susannah Edwards, accused of witchcraft and which resulted in one of the last hangings for witchcraft in England.

=== 1800–1939 ===
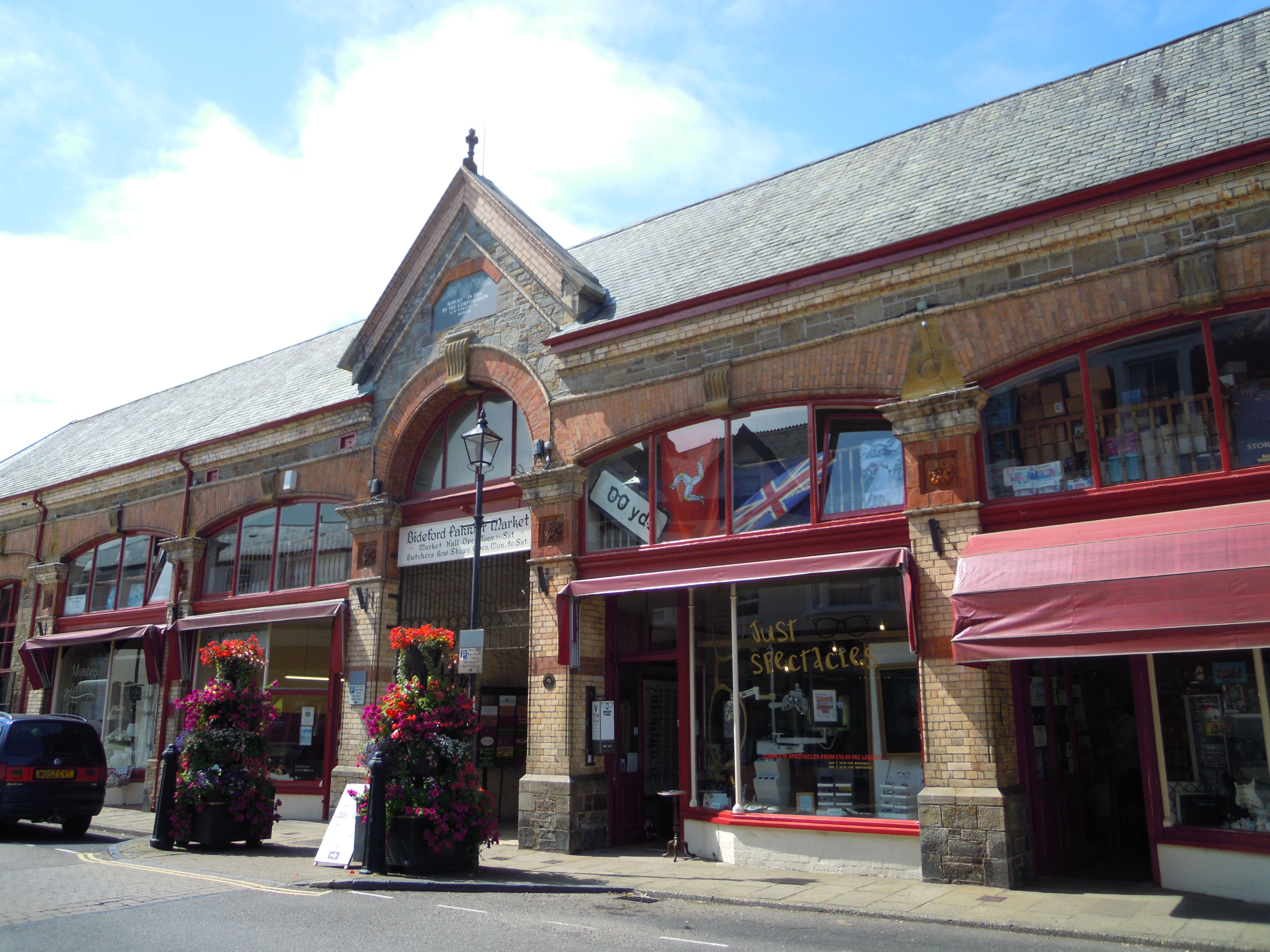
The Pannier Market opened in 1884

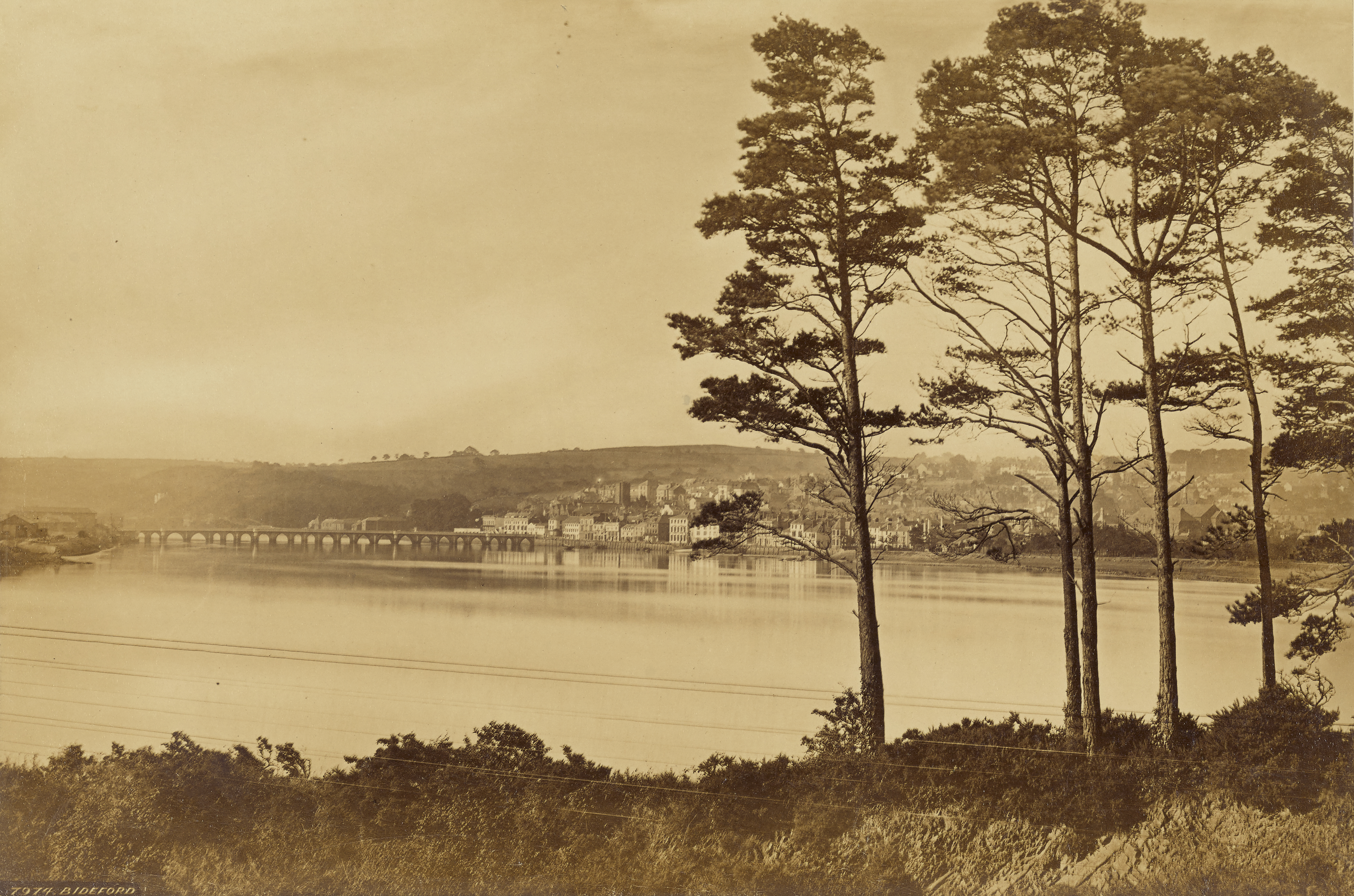
Bideford (1860–80) by Francis Frith, using albumen silver print

In 1816 a mob forced their way into Bideford prison to try and break out some of the mob's ringleaders, and soldiers from the Royal North Devon Yeomanry had to be mustered, and then patrolled the town, where they arrested several members of the mob who were then escorted to Exeter. In 1835 the Bideford Poor Law Union was founded; followed by the building, in 1837, of the Bideford workhouse in Meddon Street. The workhouse had a 40-bed infirmary and would later become Torridge Hospital and, eventually, a residential building. In 1830 it was reported that 5000 people waved farewell to ships leaving Bideford for New York City, Montreal, and St. Andrews (New Brunswick). Between the years 1840 and 1900 2,467 people emigrated to Canada and 248 to the United States aboard ships from Bideford.

The population of Bideford in the 1841 census was 3,830. There were 9 or 10 shipbuilding yards in the 1840s.

In 1847 a horse-drawn omnibus taking people to a fair in Torrington fell off Bideford Quay into the River Torridge, and eight people were drowned. The book "Kingsley's County" put the expansion and growth of Bideford down to the publication of Charles Kingsley's romance Westward Ho! in 1855. There was an extension of the London and South Western Railway from Barnstaple in 1856. The Pannier Market opened in 1884. In 1902 the first car arrived in Bideford: it was owned by Dr E.J. Toye, the car being a 4-1/2 hp Benz.

=== World War II ===
In 1942 American GIs arrived in Bideford. At first they were there to work in radar stations across North Devon and work on experimental things. More American troops began to arrive as the war progressed. Experiments nearby, including The Great Panjandrum, were said to be viewed in the area in secret by Dwight D. Eisenhower and Sir Winston Churchill at the Strand Cinema. In 1943 more Americans arrived as D-day training had begun at beaches across North Devon During the war Bideford Ordnance Experimental Station Depot O-617 was set up to experiment on waterproofing equipment for the D-day landings. The Americans' GI camp was at Bowden Green in Bideford, and had plenty of facilities, including a cinema. There was also a vehicle repair shop off the Kingsley Road, and the Pill was taken over by US forces as well. Because of the sheer number of American soldiers in the area by 1943 the American Red Cross opened a club near Chudleigh Fort in East-the-Water. Bideford had an Auxiliary Unit Patrol at Cleave Mine, the men of this patrol were expected to be the resistance if Britain was invaded. During the war 2700 evacuees were expected in Bideford; a large number of these came and stayed throughout the war. During World War II a bomb was dropped on a house in Bowden Green and caused substantial damage. Also during the war an RCAF bomber crashed in East the Water; three men were killed and one badly injured. A memorial has been put on the Tarka Trail to commemorate this. It is also thought that during the war there was an experimental Royal Navy unit testing a secret petrol pipeline in the river. It is thought that after being rescued in the Bristol Channel, some German airman were brought ashore at Bideford, where they were taken to Bideford Hospital. There was also a POW camp at Handy Cross. It has been discovered that the Nazis had a map of Bideford in readiness for a possible invasion, also that the Nazis had an aerial picture of the area for intelligence purposes.

=== Long Bridge ===
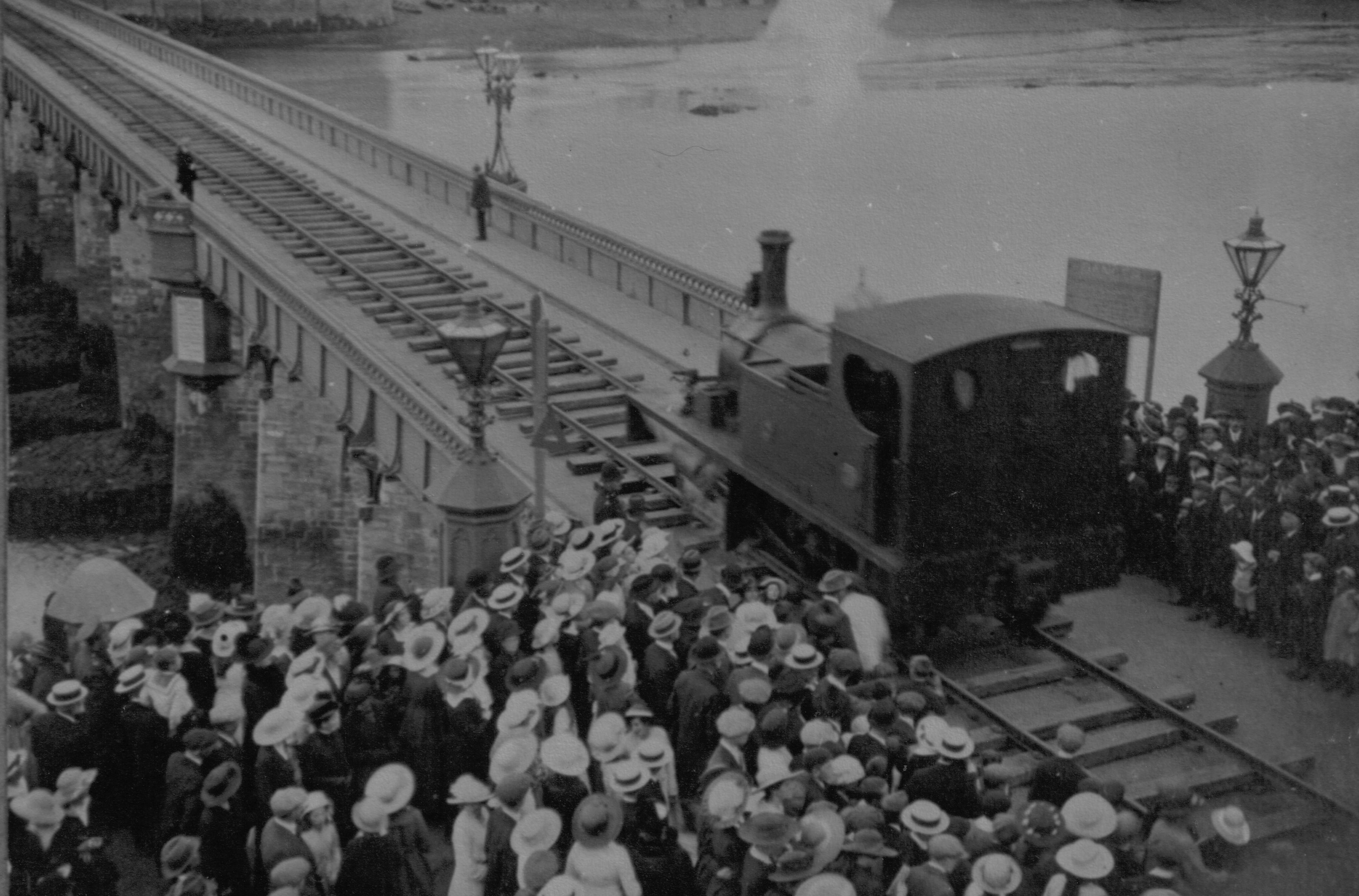
A locomotive crossing the Long Bridge.

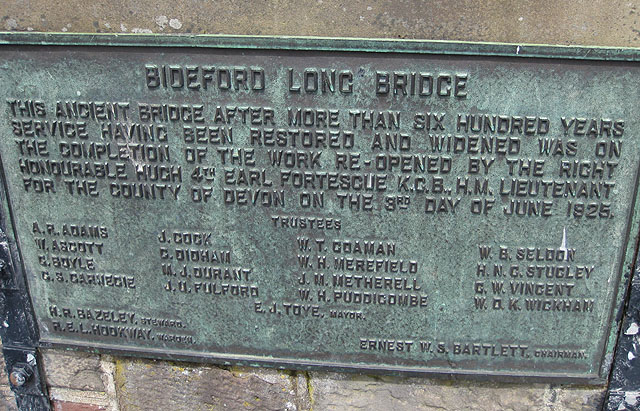
Memorial plaque on Bideford Long Bridge recording the restoration and widening completed in 1925

The original Long Bridge spanning the River Torridge connecting the East and West of the town was said to have been built out of timber in the year 1286. In 1474 the original structure was replaced by the masonry arch bridge seen today. The bridge was built around the timber so people could still use it while construction was taking place, possibly resulting in the 24 arches all being of different sizes. A traditional explanation is that each arch was funded by a different local guild, although there are no records to confirm this. Another theory is that the piers of the arches of the bridge were built on naturally existing, and therefore randomly situated, large stones in the river. During the first decade of the 17th century, the bridge trustees were taken to court by the people of Bideford for feasting and seeing plays at the expense of the trust funds. The people won the court case, although it is unclear whether the trustees were forced to resign after the scandal, or whatever else happened to them. In 1790 the bridge was the longest in Devon. In the 1820s there was talk of converting the bridge so that it could be raised and lowered to allow larger boats and ships to pass under it. In 1886 a Ship called 'Edward Birkbeck' launched from a Bideford shipyard hit the bridge, but only caused small damage by knocking some of the stones out. In 1925 another incident took place on the bridge: during the widening of the bridge a lorry came off the side of the bridge and crashed into the River Torridge, and it is believed that both the people in the lorry survived. During World War II the 10th arch of the bridge was being repaired, and the police asked for ladders and scaffolding to be removed from the bridge to prevent potential invaders climbing up and capturing the bridge. During the war the Home Guard patrolled the bridge. The Bideford Bridge Trust held responsibility for the long bridge right up until the year 1968 when one of the arches of the bridge collapsed. The Department of Transport then took over the bridge. During the rebuilding of that damaged part of the bridge a crane toppled over, and a man was killed. An inspection by Devon County Council in July 2007 revealed problems with the bridge's concrete and structure, so in September 2008 work began on putting in the cathodic protection system which restored the bridge for another 60 years. A sight which many holiday-makers and locals enjoy is seeing the starlings at dusk, as they roost underneath the bridge.

=== Port and shipping ===
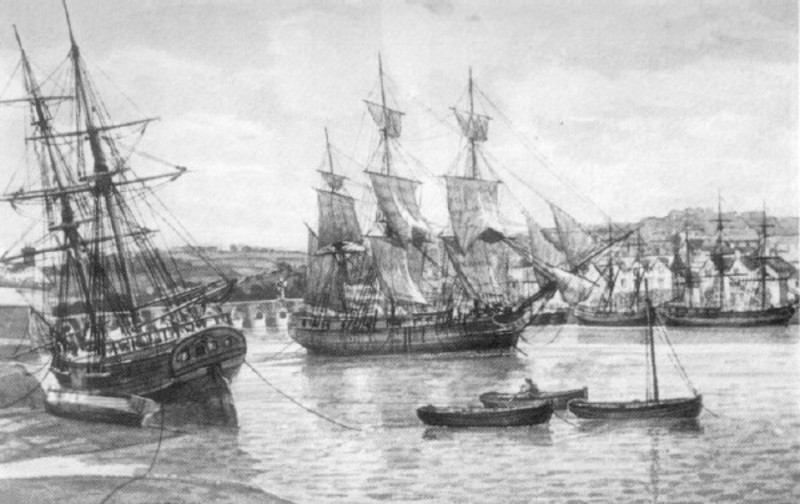
'Scene at Bideford Bridge', by Mark Myers during the 18th century.

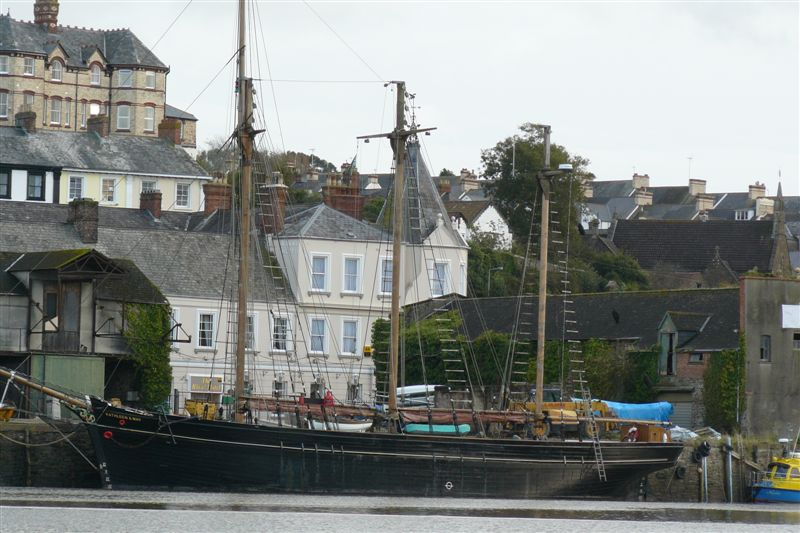
The Kathleen and May at Brunswick Wharf, Bideford.

By the 16th century Bideford had become Britain's third largest port. Sir Walter Raleigh landed his first shipment of tobacco here, although, contrary to popular belief, he was not the first to import tobacco to England. Several local roads and a hill have been named after Raleigh. Bideford was heavily involved in the transport of indentured servants to the New World colonies. Bideford also was heavily involved in the Newfoundland cod trade from the 16th century to the mid-18th century. 28 Bideford vessels with a tonnage of 3860 were involved in this practice in the year 1700. In the years 1706, 1707, 1726 and 1758 fishermen of Bideford sent petitions demanding the building of a fort in Newfoundland to protect them from Native Americans and the French. Bideford also imported large amounts of Irish wool in the 18th century.

Two prominent shipbuilders in Bideford were George Crocker and Richard Chapman: they built a large number of ships. A number of ships have been built in Bideford, including HMS Acorn, an 18-gun sloop launched in 1807; and HMS Mutine, HMS Fairy, HMS Carnation and HMS Ontario, which were all 18-gun Cruizer-class brig-sloops, HMS Garland and HMS Volage were both 22-gun Royal Navy Laurel-class post ships, and HMS Meda, a harbour defence motor launch was built and launched in the town. Around 150 ships were built between 1840 and 1877 at Higher Cleave Houses in Bideford. The largest wooden ship to be built in Bideford was the Sarah Newman, a 1,004-ton full-rigged ship built in 1855. During the 19th century over 815 registered wooden sailing ships were launched on the Torridge, as too were hundreds of unregistered craft. Shipbuilding in the Bideford area declined during the 1890s as shipyards in Britain's industrial regions constructed steel steamships. The last wooden merchant ship launched in the River Torridge was the schooner PT Harris from the Hubbastone yard of PK Harris & Sons, in 1912.

During World War II a Shoreham-class sloop was named HMS Bideford, also four sixth-rate ships of the line have been named after the town. Nowadays the only shipbuilding in the area is at Appledore Shipbuilders, which has built civilian ships and ships for the Royal Navy and Irish Naval Service. Currently ball clay is exported from Bideford to Castellón, Spain and also Naantali, Finland; also wood has been exported to Wismar, Germany. The Kathleen and May, the last remaining British-built wooden-hull three-masted topsail schooner, is registered in Bideford and was at one time based there. There are also some fishing boats that still operate out of Bideford.

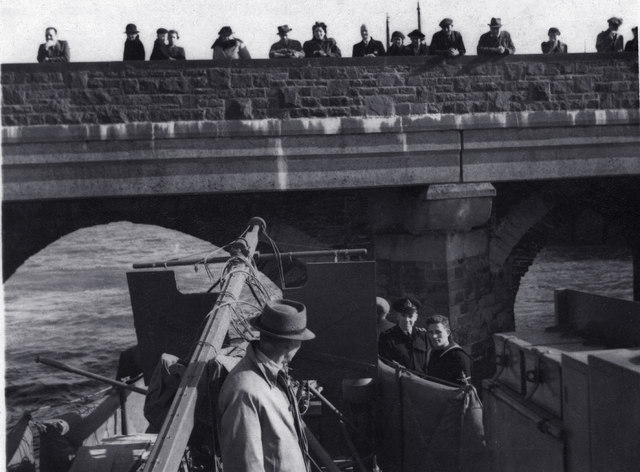
Motor Launch ML1301 about to pass under the Long Bridge after being constructed at Blackmore's Yard.

=== Late 20th century ===
In 1966, Bideford Zoo was built by Mrs K. Tottenham and opened on 29 May 1966. The original inhabitants included sea lions, bears and raccoons. It finally closed in October 1970. The site is now a housing estate, and the old zoo house known as "Ford House" has now been converted into flats.

=== Literary references ===
This area of North Devon was home to the author Charles Kingsley, and is where he based his novel Westward Ho!. A small seaside town, named after the book, was built after the book's publication.

Westward Ho!, the only town in the United Kingdom which officially contains an exclamation mark in its name, is approximately three miles (5 km) from Bideford. A statue was erected in honour of Kingsley near the car park of Victoria Park.

=== Namesakes ===
The city of Biddeford, Maine, in the United States was named after the English town, using the original old English spelling. Also, the town of Bideford in the province of Prince Edward Island, Canada, is named after the English town, as is the small town of Bideford, New Zealand.

=== Bideford Black ===
Bideford Black is a unique pigment which was mined for 200 years up until 1969 in Bideford and the surrounding area. The deposits were formed 350 million years ago during the Carboniferous period on Gondwana. Bideford Black contains carbon, silica and alumina, with the black colouration created by the carbon. The seams containing Bideford Black Stretch from Hartland, underneath Bideford, and onto Umberleigh. Bideford Black was used in a number of ways; for example, it was used as camouflage paint during World War II, in mascara by Max Factor, by artists, and in the boatbuilding industry. Bideford Black was processed as a paint and a dye up until the mining stopped. A number of artists (mainly local artists) used these Bideford Black paints and oils in their works. The Bideford Black Mining Company produced Biddiblack powder at a processing plant in Chapel Park, East-the-Water. Some of the miners' houses were situated at Springfield Terrace, East-the-Water.

The mining of the pigment became unviable when other blacks went into large, cheap commercial production. Bideford Black has also been known as "The Mother of Coal"; there are still a number of places where evidence of the mine can be seen, like old mine entrances just off the Barnstaple road. A number of roads are named after the mining in the town, including Mines Road, Pitt Lane, Biddiblack Way and other roads.

Recently some Bideford Black was exchanged, by locals, for some pigments provided by Australian Aboriginal Elder Noel Butler. Noel Butler's nephew has used the Bideford Black to paint his body for Aboriginal ceremonial events in Australia. The Heritage lottery fund has given a grant of £8700 to the Burton Art Gallery to fund research into Bideford Black. In October 2013 a display about Bideford Black was presented at Bideford's Burton Art Gallery.

== Demography ==
Historical population
Year	Pop.	±%
1991	13,006	—
2001	14,599	+12.2%
2011	17,107	+17.2%

In 2011 government statistics recorded the population at 17,107, its highest ever. Between 2011 and 2026 Bideford's population was expected to rise by 9,689 people. The birth rate in Bideford is 60.2 out of 1000 women, compared with the 52.8 per 1000 women which is the average for Devon. Life expectancy in Bideford is 80.7 years, that is 0.9 years less than the average for Devon. Bideford has the highest rate of youth offending in Devon at 21.5 in 1000 people, compared with 13.2 in a 1000 people as the Devon average.

Bideford is largely ethnically homogenous, with the 2001 census reporting that 98.3% of the population were white in the parish. 3.3% of school children are from ethnic minorities and 0.9% of school children do not have English as their first language, the lowest in Devon. In 2001 31.6% of households were classed as "single person households". In 2004 Bideford was classed as one of the most deprived areas in the Torridge area. In November 2008 1.95% of the population claimed job-seekers allowance. Domestic violence rates are 2.6% higher than the Devon average, alcohol-related crime is 0.4% higher than the Devon average, and drugs-related crime is the same as the Devon average.

== Transport ==
=== Roads ===
Bideford is served by the A39 Atlantic Highway and A386 roads.

=== Ferry ===
A ferry operates between Bideford quay and Lundy Island, approximately 22 miles (35 km) away in the Bristol Channel. The same ship, the MS Oldenburg, also provides evening cruises downstream from Bideford along the River Torridge.

=== South West Coast Path ===
The South West Coast Path National Trail runs through the town, and gives access to the North Devon coast.

=== Buses ===
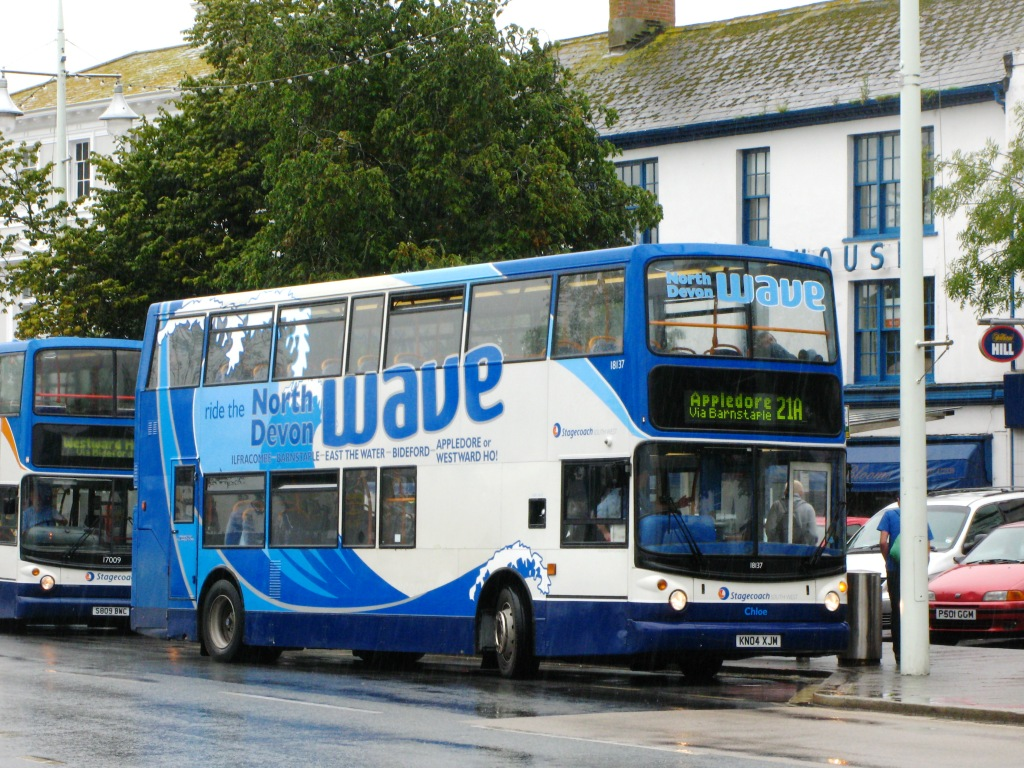
A Stagecoach South West bus in North Devon Wave route livery (2011)

Bus services are provided by Stagecoach South West; key routes include:

- 5B Barnstaple – Torrington – Crediton – Exeter
- 15/15A East-the-Water – Bideford Quay – Affinity Outlet Devon
- 21 Barnstaple – Fremington – Westward Ho!
- 21A Barnstaple – Fremington – Appledore
- 75 Bideford – Torrington – Dartington Fields
- 85 Barnstaple – Holsworthy
- 317 Bideford – Torrington – Okehampton
- 319 Barnstaple – Abbotsham – Woolsery – Hartland.

=== Railway ===
The nearest railway station is at Barnstaple 7 1/2 miles (12.1 km) away. Bideford was previously connected to the national rail network, but the connection was lost in 1982 (by then a freight branch, which was still operating due to the mining of ball clay traffic from Meeth Quarry) with the closure of the line from Barnstaple to Torrington and Meeth Quarry. Passenger services were closed in 1965 following the publication of the Beeching Report. The station still exists at East-the-Water and is now managed by a preservation group, the Bideford Railway Heritage Centre. The line followed the contours of the River Torridge for much of its route to Torrington and most of it is part of the Tarka Trail.

In 2009, James May's Toy Stories attempted to run OO gauge trains on a temporary track on the right of way. A subsequent attempt in 2011 was successful.

In 2009 the Association of Train Operating Companies costed reopening the Barnstaple to Bideford route at £80 million. But in 2010 Devon County Council rejected proposals by Torridge District Council to consider reopening.

==== Bideford, Westward Ho! and Appledore Railway ====
The Bideford, Westward Ho! and Appledore Railway was an unusual and short-lived railway built entirely on this peninsula with no direct connection to the rest of the British railway network. The locomotives were fitted with skirts to protect pedestrians, as at one point the line ran along the quay at Bideford. The line had eleven halts which largely served visitors wishing to enjoy the scenery along the coast or the beaches around Westward Ho!. The railway, although authorised in 1896, was opened only as far as Northam by 1901, and finally reached Appledore in 1908.

The railway fell into financial difficulties and in the First World War, the War Department requisitioned all of its equipment for use in France. Bideford's 13th-century Long Bridge was temporarily converted into a railway bridge to carry the locomotives and rolling stock onto the main line railway near Bideford Station.

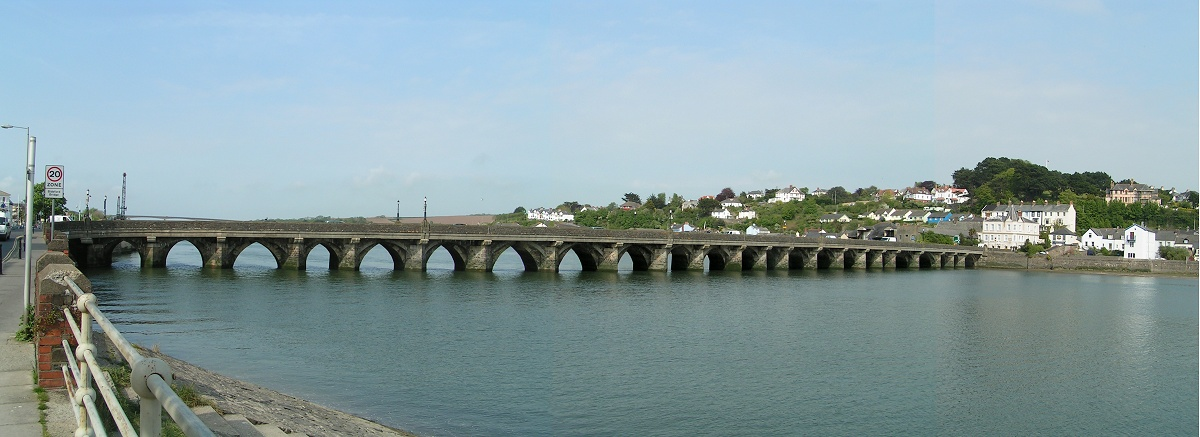
A view of Bideford long bridge.

== Climate ==
Bideford has a wet but mild climate; during the winter Bideford experiences a lot of changeable weather conditions, mild cloudy/ drizzly weather off the Atlantic with daytime temperatures typically 11/12c and mild nights in high single figures, alternating with clear periods which can allow for frosty nights and early mornings with temperatures −2/-4c and maybe only 4-5c by day: Bideford also gets some snow but it rarely settles for long. During the summer Bideford can experience wet and unsettled weather off the Atlantic but also can be one of the warmest places in Devon when warm continental air masses move up off the continent and in 2022 a short heatwave around 17–18 July produced record warmth with temperatures pushing 35c and overnight lows in the high teens.

Climate data for Bideford, United Kingdom
Month	Jan	Feb	Mar	Apr	May	Jun	Jul	Aug	Sep	Oct	Nov	Dec	Year
Record high °C (°F)	16 (61)	18 (64)	20 (68)	25 (77)	27 (81)	31 (88)	35 (95)	34 (93)	28 (82)	29 (84)	18 (64)	15 (59)	34 (93)
Mean daily maximum °C (°F)	8 (46)	8 (46)	10 (50)	12 (54)	16 (61)	19 (66)	21 (70)	20 (68)	19 (66)	15 (59)	11 (52)	9 (48)	14 (57)
Mean daily minimum °C (°F)	4 (39)	3 (37)	5 (41)	6 (43)	8 (46)	11 (52)	14 (57)	13 (55)	11 (52)	9 (48)	6 (43)	5 (41)	8 (46)
Record low °C (°F)	−6 (21)	−6 (21)	−9 (16)	−3 (27)	0 (32)	1 (34)	6 (43)	6 (43)	−1 (30)	−2 (28)	−6 (21)	−6 (21)	−9 (16)
Average rainfall mm (inches)	75 (3.0)	46 (1.8)	57 (2.2)	54 (2.1)	36 (1.4)	51 (2.0)	64 (2.5)	45 (1.8)	63 (2.5)	93 (3.7)	75 (3.0)	81 (3.2)	740 (29.2)
Average rainy days	5	5	6	4	4	4	4	5	5	4	4	3	53
Source 1: Weather2
Source 2: HolidayCheck.com

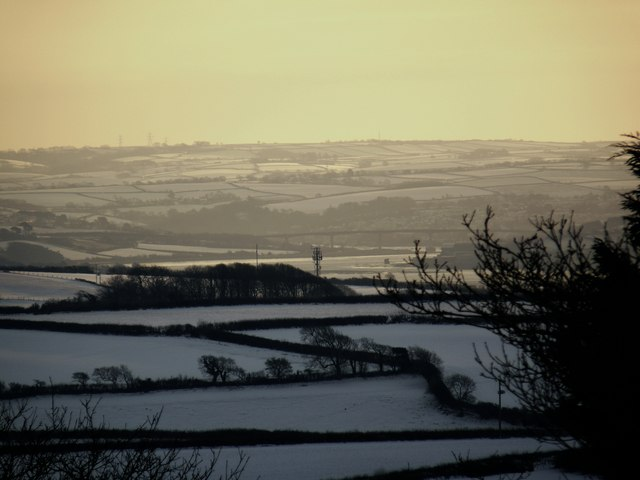
The Torridge Bridge in Bideford, surrounded by snow.

== East-the-Water ==
The town of Bideford has grown to cover land on both sides of the River Torridge; the area located east of the river is known as East-the-Water and also spelled East the Water without hyphens. Much of the land that has been built on in recent years is drained marshland.

East-the-Water has its own primary school, local shops, a few factories, approximately 3 bars and pubs, a small health centre and a small industrial area consisting largely of locally owned businesses. It is mainly public housing, especially on the Pollyfield estate. The community also has its own community centre and association, both of which are self-funding and run by a committee of local residents. A key historical feature is Chudleigh Fort, built by the Parliamentarian Major-General James Chudleigh during the English Civil War. The area is surrounded by agricultural land.

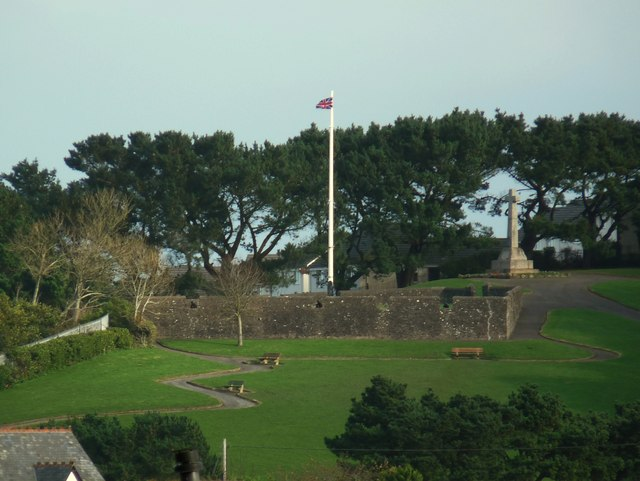
Chudleigh Fort erected by Major-General James Chudleigh.

Buried in the now abandoned and neglected East-the-Water Cemetery in adjacent plots are Victoria Cross recipients Gerald Graham and George Channer.

== Governance ==
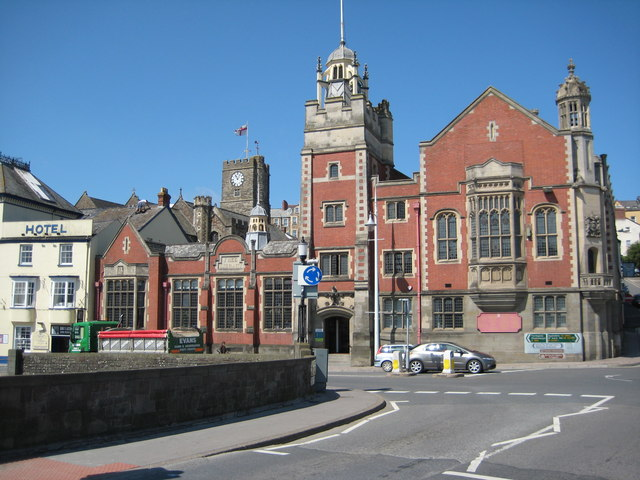
Bideford Town Hall (built 1850, extended 1906).

Bideford Town Council, which is based at Bideford Town Hall, has 16 seats representing four unequal wards, North, South, East and South Outer. At the May 2011 local elections, seven Conservatives, three independents, two Liberal Democrats, two Labour and one Green were elected (there was one vacant seat). There is a mayor and Town Clerk. The town council received widespread attention in February 2012 when the High Court ruled that prayers as part of meetings were not lawful by the Local Government Act 1972.

Torridge District Council is the next level of local government and most decisions are made by Devon County Council. Torridge District Council is responsible for maintaining Bideford Higher Cemetery.

The local MP is the Conservative Geoffrey Cox. The two Devon County Council councillors who represent the town are Anthony Inch and Linda Hellyer, they are both members of the Conservative Party.

== Education ==
State-funded primary schools in Bideford include East-the-Water Primary School, St. Mary's Church of England Primary School and Westcroft School. Bideford College is the main state-funded secondary school serving the area.

Kingsley School is a co-educational independent school situated in Bideford. It was founded in 2009 when Grenville College and Edgehill College merged. It is a member of the Methodist Independent Schools trust.

== Religion ==
St Mary's Church in Bideford (2018)

Bideford has a number of churches:

- St Mary's Church is Church of England and one of the largest in the town; the clock on the 13th-century tower is visible throughout the town. The church building was rebuilt in 1862-5 when the original Norman church was pulled down and is Grade II* listed. The church enjoys a healthy relationship with the St. Mary's C of E Primary School, which is in the town; children from the school attend a number of services at the church during school time.
- Bideford Baptist Church's Sunday services include Communion on the 1st and 3rd Sunday of each month.*
- The Abundant Life Church meets at the Bideford Youth Centre on the Pill and holds a number of events.
- The Lavington United Reformed Church is in Bridgeland Street; the current building opened in 1869.
- The Sacred Heart Catholic Church is situated on Northam Road.
- The Bethel Free Church is located in East-the-Water.
- There is also a Methodist church in Bideford High Street. In North Road there is an Evangelical Chapel.
- The Religious Society of Friends has a Quaker Meeting House in Honestone Street, opposite the entrance to the Pannier Market car park.
- St Peter's Church, in East-the-Water, was built over 130 years ago. It has not been worshipped in for 10 years and is now in use as a gymnasium.

In 2011, 61.8% of people in Bideford and nearby Northam described themselves as Christian, 0.3% as Buddhist, 0.2% as Muslims and 0.7% were classed as part of the other religion category. The number of religious people in the area is higher than the average in Devon.

Religion in Bideford
Religion	Percentage of Bideford Population
Christian	61.8%
Buddhist	0.3%
Muslim	0.2%
Hindu	0.0%
Jewish	0.0%
Sikh	0.0%
Other religion	0.7%
No religion	28.6%
Religion not stated	8.4%

== Culture ==
=== New Year traditions ===
Bideford is renowned for its New Year's Eve celebrations, when thousands of people – most in fancy dress – from surrounding towns, villages, and around the world gather on the quay for revelries and a fireworks display. The event normally includes a number of local musical acts performing on the X Radio One Roadshow stage. Andrew's Dole is a custom dating from 1605. In that year, the Mayor of Bideford, Andrew Dole, established a trust to provide for loaves of bread to be distributed to poor, elderly, persons who applied at the Mayor's Parlour. The custom continues to this day and takes place on New Year's Day. He also left some land to trustees and the income is distributed to 10 deserving people, for each trustee.

=== Radio ===
Local radio is provided by BBC Radio Devon, Radio Exe Devon, and Heart West - which started in 1992 and originally called Lantern FM, was based in Bideford in a building named "the Lighthouse", and later moved to an industrial estate in nearby Barnstaple. In April 2009, the station was rebranded as part of the Heart Network, losing the long-standing Lantern FM name. In August 2010, amid much controversy, the station was merged with its sister operations in other areas of Devon and all operations were moved to new studios in Exeter and renamed Heart Devon. As a result, numerous members of staff at Barnstaple were made redundant. Since then, many of the Lantern FM team, past and present, have reunited to create The Voice, a local radio station currently broadcasting across Devon on DAB Digital radio. The radio station was launched on FM in January 2014 after being granted an FM Licence.

=== Television ===
Local news and television programmes are provided by BBC South West and ITV West Country. Television signals are received from the Huntshaw Cross TV transmitter and the local relay transmitter situated in Westward Ho!.

=== Newspapers ===
Bideford is covered by two main local newspapers, the North Devon Gazette and the North Devon Journal which are published weekly. The Gazette was founded in Bideford, and was originally known as the Bideford Gazette. It is now a free newspaper, delivered to most local homes, and is now based in Barnstaple. The regional daily paper, the Western Morning News, is also available. A local newsletter, the Bideford Buzz, was published monthly from 2000– 18 by a team of volunteers, and from October 2018 is available online only.

=== Twinning ===
The town is twinned with Landivisiau in France. It has been twinned with Landivisiau since 1976; each year members of the Bideford Twinning Association take part in an exchange trip with Landivisiau. On 20 October 2006, British ex-patriate David Riley came to mark the '20-year link' between Manteo on Roanoke Island, North Carolina, and Bideford. The Bideford town clerk, George McLauchlan, told him that locals had never heard of Manteo, and that the only town Bideford was twinned with was in France. Mr Riley handed over a clock to 'celebrate' the twenty-year link, while the Manteo Town manager Kermit Skinner said the link started in the 1980s during the 400th anniversary of Raleigh's voyages to America. It turns out the 'twinning' of Bideford with Manteo had been established 20 years before. But the story goes back much further – 500 years – to the mysterious disappearance of a colony of more than 100 people on Roanoke Island, many of whom were immigrants from Bideford. The colony was established by Sir Richard Grenville, who brought back two Native American Indians, one of them called Manteo which gave the North Carolina town its name.

=== Art ===
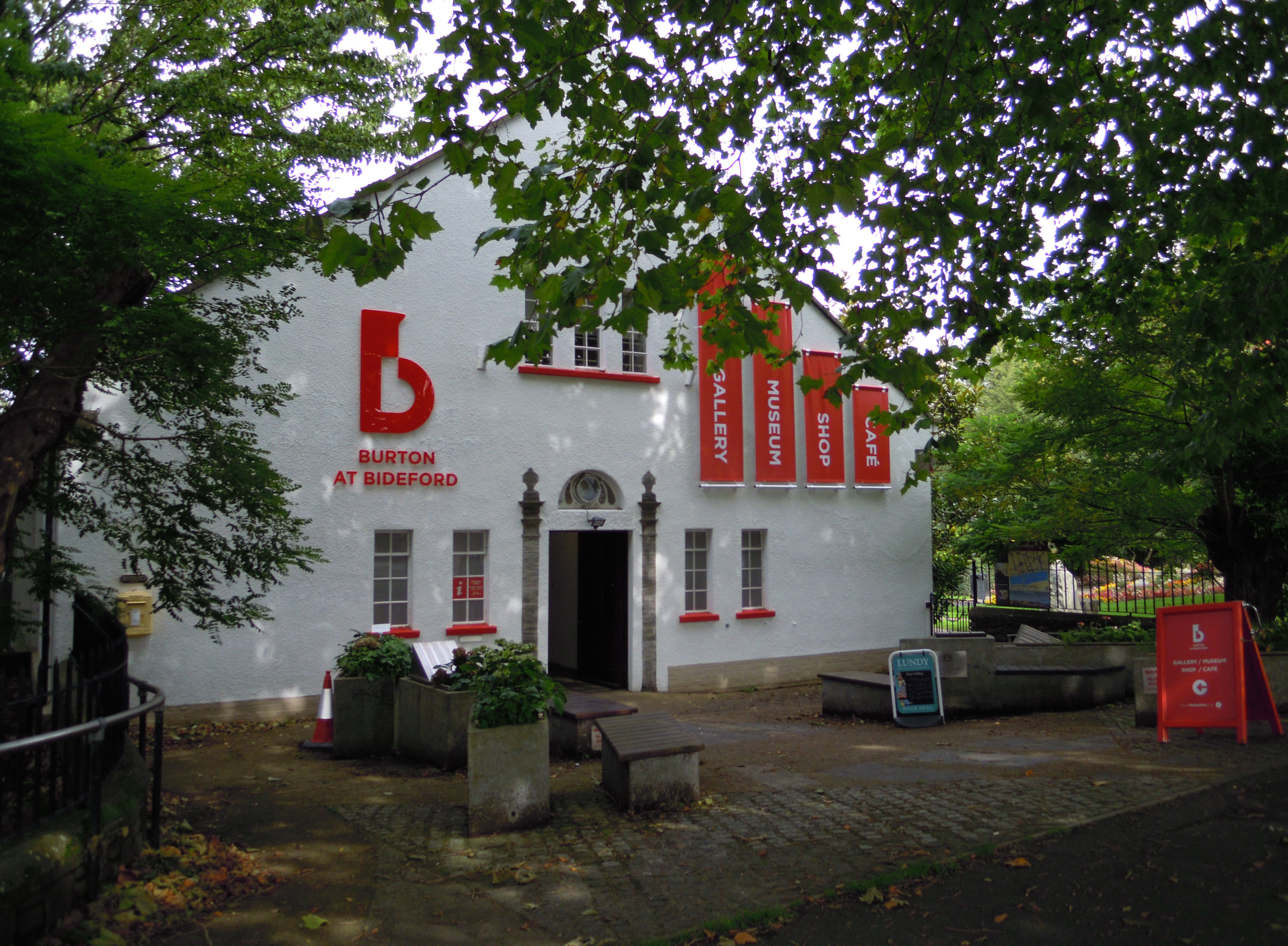
The Burton at Bideford Art Gallery & Museum

Bideford Art School was located on The Quay from 1896 to the 1970s. Alumni included Judith Ackland and novelist Rosemary Sutcliff. Today the building houses Bideford Arts Centre. The Burton at Bideford is an art gallery and museum in the town that has collections on various things of interest connected with Bideford's heritage, including clay pipes and tea caddies. The art gallery displays work by local artists featuring local heritage and local landscapes.

=== Bideford Film Society ===
The Bideford Film Society was set up in 2001 and with the aid of a grant from the Bridge Trust and Bideford Town Council. The Bideford Film Society shows films just after their cinema release. The films are screened at Kingsley School, or in the Devon Hall at Bideford College.

=== Markets ===
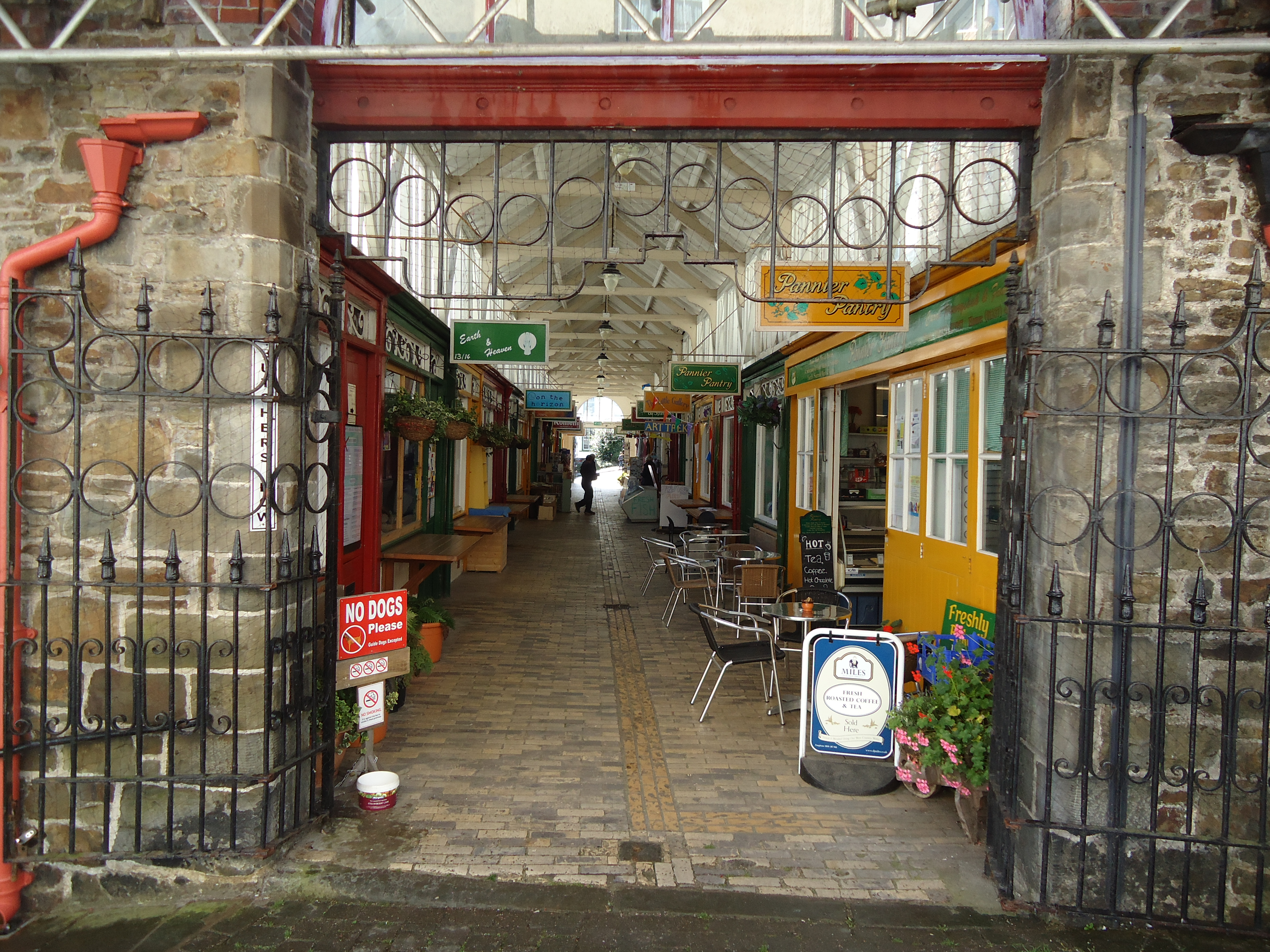
An Entrance to Butchers Row in Bideford Pannier Market.

In 1272 Bideford was granted a market charter, and has had many markets throughout the years. The medieval market was once held near to where the bottom of the High Street is today. The current Pannier Market has been there since 1884, and consists of a large market hall which, as well as markets, hosts boxing matches and other events; and Butchers Row which is now made up of small shops, galleries, and butchers' stalls.

A farmers' market takes place on the quay on nearly every Saturday throughout the summer. A continental market also visits Bideford annually – market traders from France, Belgium, Italy, Spain, Holland, Poland and other countries come to sell products on the quay.

=== Shopping ===
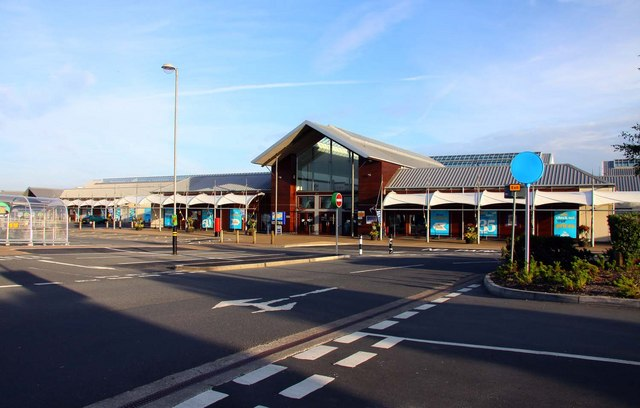
Affinity Devon.

Bideford has many small shops and galleries. Affinity Devon, formerly Atlantic Village, is an outlet shopping centre on the western outskirts of the town: it has over thirty retail outlets Opposite Affinity Devon is Atlantic Park, a collection of restaurants, supermarkets and hotel chains built in 2015. This destroyed large parts of Moreton Park Woods and was campaigned against by local residents.

== Sport and recreation ==
The Bideford A.F.C. crest.

Bideford has two King George's Fields, which are memorials to King George V. One field is used primarily as the home ground of the main local rugby union club, Bideford RFC (Chiefs) who currently play in Counties 1 Western West.

The other field, commonly referred to as The Sports Ground, is the home to Bideford AFC, the town's main local football club, they currently play in the Southern Football League Division One South and are managed by Sean William Joyce.

East-the-Water also has its own football club, Shamwickshire Rovers FC, which plays at Pollyfield.

There is a cricket club in the park called Victoria Park Cricket Club, but there is also Bideford, Littleham and Westward Ho! Cricket Club and they play in Westward Ho!

There are two bowling clubs in the town, one is Bideford Bowling Club who play near to The Sports Ground, and the other is Bideford Victoria Park Bowling Club.

There is also a gymnastics club in the town called the North Devon Display Gymnastic Club.

In 2009 the sixth stage of the Tour of Britain finished in the town, and large crowds lined the quay where it finished. In 2012 the Tour of Britain passed through the town, again large crowds came out to watch.

On 19 March 2012 the 2012 Olympic torch relay passed through the town, when large crowds lined the town's streets, and school children from the town's schools were also allowed to line the route – even though it was during the school day.

== Notable people ==
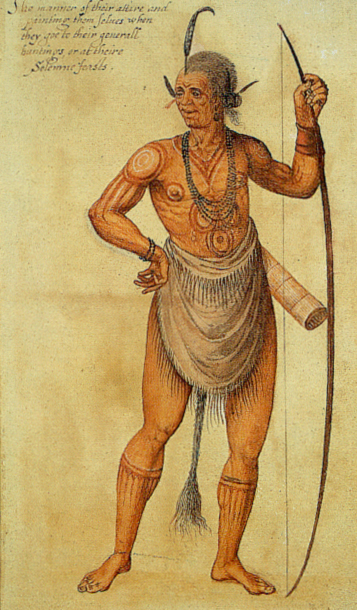
Raleigh the North American servant of Sir Richard Grenville

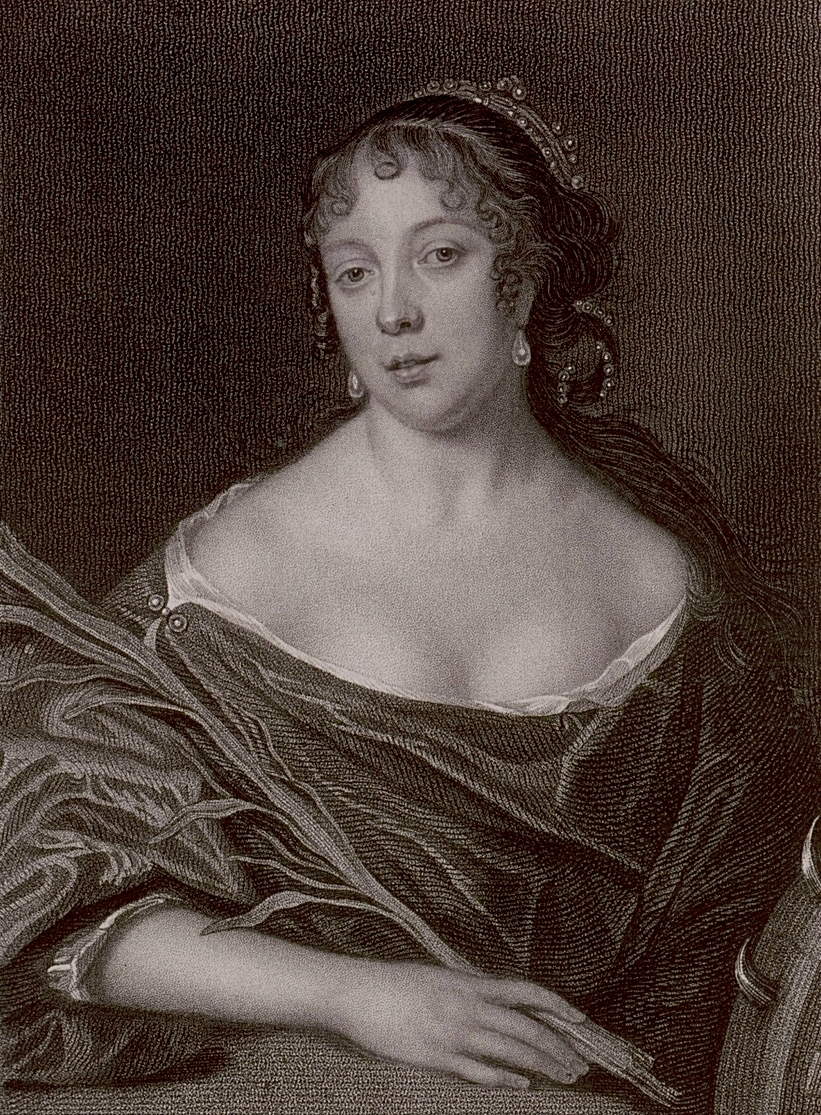
Elizabeth Pepys, 1825

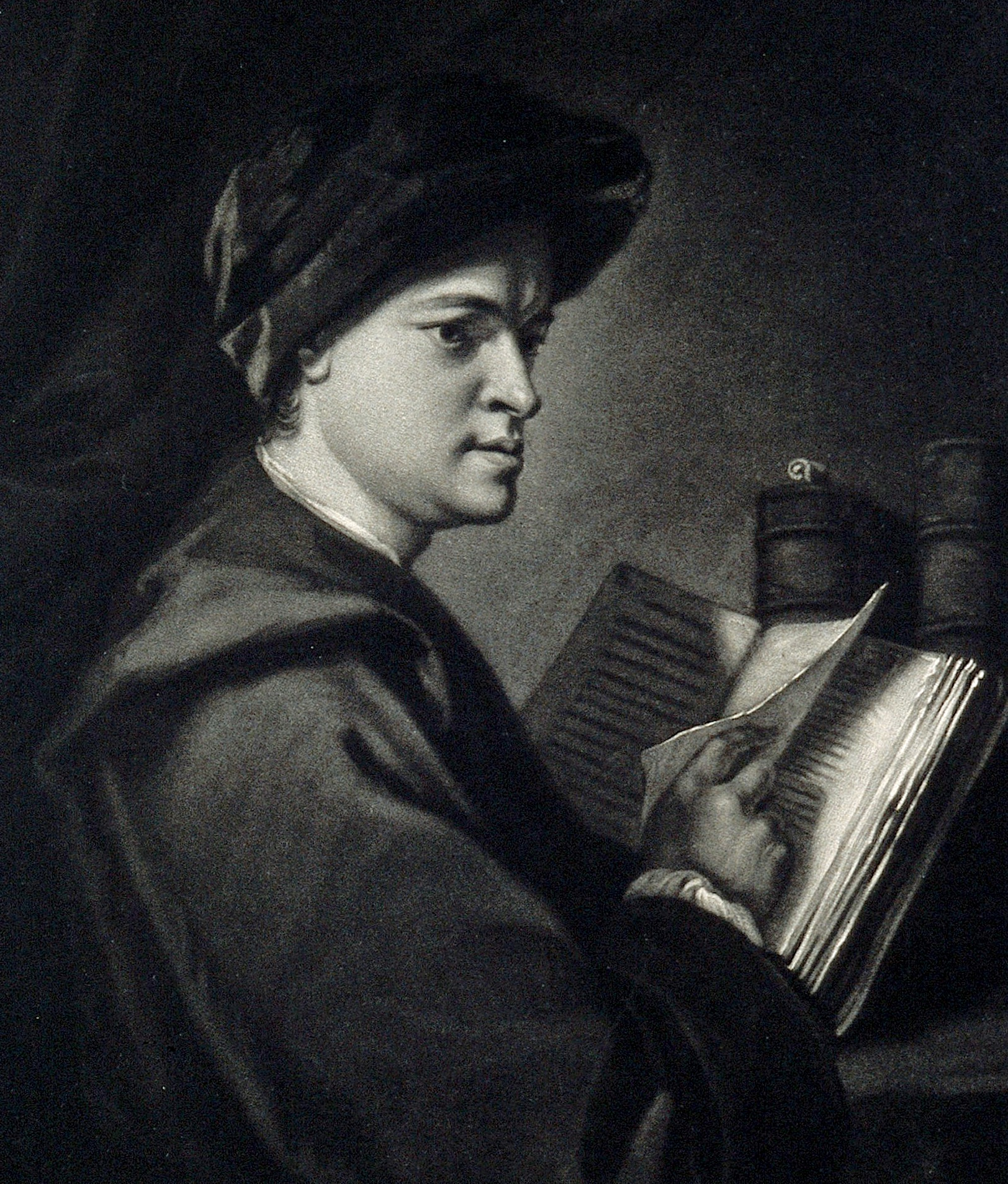
John Mudge, 1838

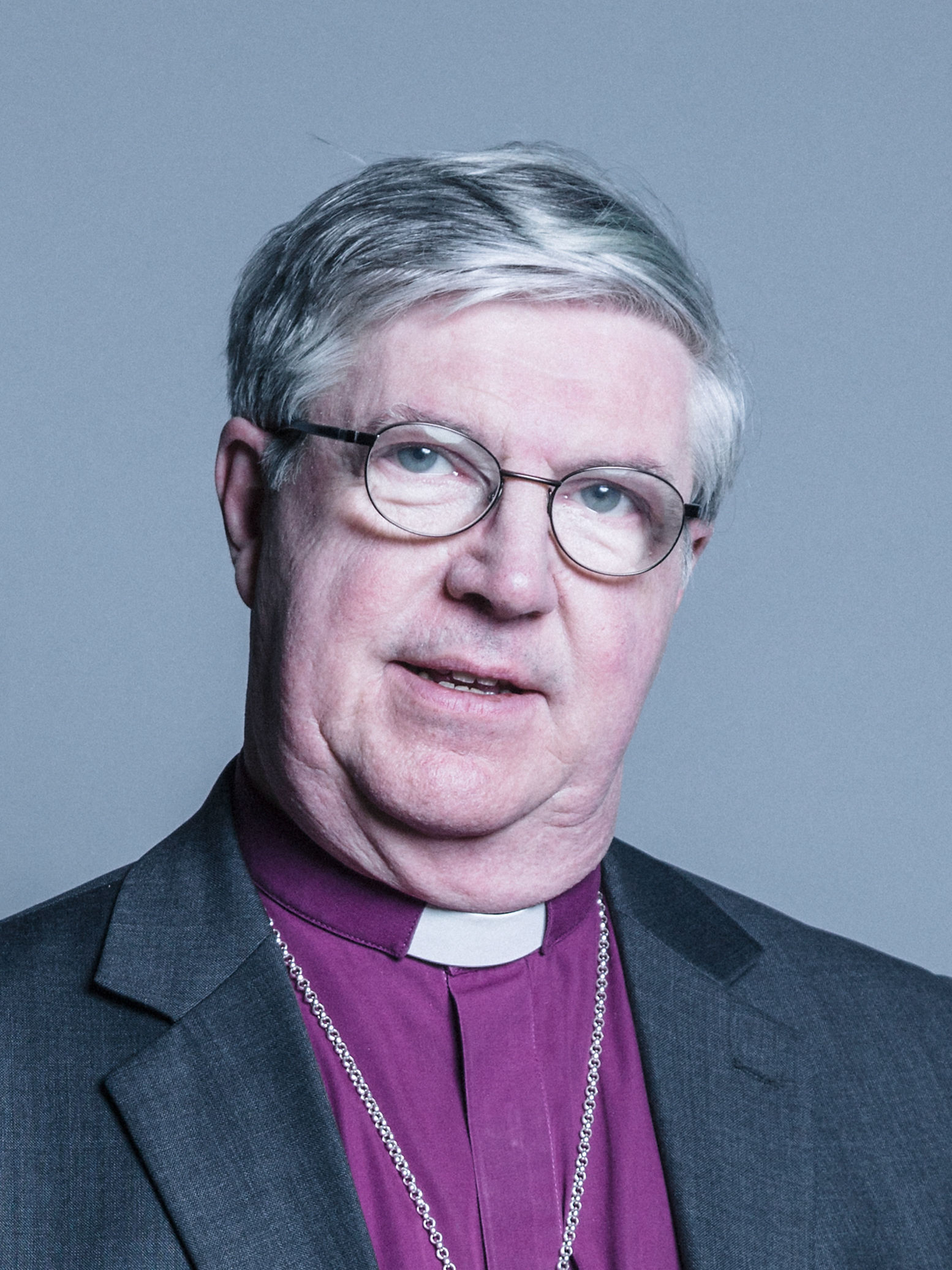
Graham James, Bishop of Norwich, 2018

- Henry de Bracton, a 13th-century English cleric and jurist lived in the town.
- Sir Richard Grenville (1542–1591), an English privateer and explorer. His servant Raleigh was one of the first Native Americans brought to England, when he died he was buried at Church of St Mary, Bideford
- Richard Vines (c.1585–1651), a colonist in northern New England.
- Francis Small (1625–ca.1714), landowner and trader who emigrated to New England aged seven.
- John Davie (1640–1710), tobacco merchant from Orleigh Court
- Elisabeth Pepys (1640–1669), wife of Samuel Pepys; he courted her here.
- In 1682, at the Bideford Witch Trial, Temperance Lloyd, Mary Trembles, and Susanna Edwards were the last people to be hanged for witchcraft in England
- John Shebbeare (1709–1788), political satirist.
- Thomas Mudge (1715–1794), horologist who invented the lever escapement.
- John Mudge (1721–1793), physician and amateur creator of telescope mirrors.
- Benjamin Donn (1729–1798) an English mathematician.
- Augustus Clevland (1754–1784) an East India Company administrator from Tapeley.
- William Turton (1762–1835), medical doctor and naturalist.
- Sir Montague Edward Smith (1806–1891), barrister, judge, Justice of the Court of Common Pleas.
- Edward Capern (1819–1894), an English poet, known as "the rural postman of Bideford", worked in Bideford Post Office from 1848.
- John Beare (1820–1914), a farmer and mill-owner, emigrated to Ontario aged 19
- Admiral Bedford Pim (1826–1886), a Royal Navy officer, Arctic explorer, barrister, and author.
- John Hanning Speke (1827–1864), explorer and army officer, three exploratory expeditions to Africa.
- Robert Trefusis (1843–1930), the first suffragan Bishop of Crediton, from 1897 to 1930.
- George Braund (1866–1915), an Australian soldier and politician, emigrated aged 15.
- Clarence Raybould (1886–1972) conductor, pianist and composer, lived in local East-the Water
- Bertram Prance (1889–1958), artist, poster artist, illustrator, cartoonist for Punch magazine, student at Bideford Art School.
- J. P. V. D. Balsdon (1901–1977), an ancient historian and writer.
- Joss Ackland (1928–2023), actor, lived near Bideford.
- Sir John Nott (1932–2024), politician and MP, the Secretary of State for Defence, 1981–1983
- Roy Kift (born 1943) an English actor and playwright, resident in Germany.
- Michael Bastow (born 1943), a British painter, he lives and works between Paris and Malaucène.
- Joanna Tope (1944–2024), actress who appeared in many TV programmes
- Paul Seed (1947–2026), TV director and actor.
- Hilary Bonner (born 1949) crime fiction author.
- Graham James (born 1951), Bishop of Norwich, 1999 to 2019.
- John Richards (born 1966), musician worked in the field of electronic music
- Chris Busby (born 1945), environmentalist and radiation scientist, lives in Richard Grenville's home
- Peter Christie (1951–2024), Britain's first Green Party mayor held the post four times; he was a local historian and councillor.
- Rose West (born 1953), serial killer was born and raised near Bideford.
- T. V. Smith (born 1956) and Gaye Advert (born 1956), from the punk band The Adverts, live here.
- Katie Hopkins (born 1975), political commentator, was raised in Bideford.

=== Sport ===
- Richard Bott (1900–1980) was a skeleton racer, who competed in the 1948 Winter Olympics.
- David Shepherd (1940–2009), a cricketer who played 282 First-class cricket games and became an umpire, he died in Instow.
- Matthew Allin (1978–2024) and his brother Tom Allin (1987–2016), were cricketers for Devon and Warwickshire respectively
- Gary Sawyer (born 1985), footballer, has played 461 games including 171 for Plymouth Argyle
- Jimmy Mullen (born 1993), golfer is from the town.

== Bibliography ==
- Watkins, John (1792). An Essay Towards a History of Bideford, in the County of Devon.
- "Bideford" . Encyclopædia Britannica. Vol. 3 (11th ed.). 1911. p. 919.
- Goaman, Muriel (1968) Old Bideford and District. Bristol: E. M. & A. G. Cox (3rd ed. 1978)
- --do.-- (1982) Bideford in Old Picture Postcards. Zaltbommel: European Library ISBN 9028821007
