= Old King Cole =

British nursery rhyme

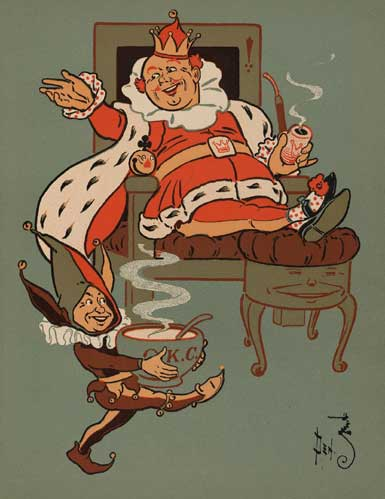
- Illustration by William Wallace Denslow

Nursery rhyme
- Published: 1709
- Songwriter: Traditional

"Old King Cole" is a British nursery rhyme first attested in 1709. Though there is much speculation about the identity of King Cole, it is unlikely that he can be identified reliably as any historical figure. It has a Roud Folk Song Index number of 1164. The poem describes a merry king who called for his pipe, bowl, and musicians, with the details varying among versions.

The "bowl" is a drinking vessel, while it is unclear whether the "pipe" is a musical instrument or a tobacco pipe, although illustrations generally depict the latter.

== Lyrics and melody ==
The most common modern version of the rhyme is:

Old King Cole was a merry old soul,
And a merry old soul was he;
He called for his pipe, and he called for his bowl,
And he called for his fiddlers three.
Every fiddler, he had a fiddle,
And a very fine fiddle had he;
Oh, there's none so rare, as can compare,
With King Cole and his fiddlers three.

The song is first attested in William King's Useful Transactions in Philosophy for January and February 1709. King's version has the following lyrics:

Good King Cole,
And he call'd for his Bowle,
And he call'd for Fidlers three;
And there was Fiddle Fiddle,
And twice Fiddle Fiddle,
For 'twas my Lady's Birth-day,
Therefore we keep Holy-day,
And come to be merry.

== Identity of King Cole ==
There is much speculation about the identity of King Cole, but it is unlikely that he can be identified reliably given the centuries between the attestation of the rhyme and the putative identities; none of the extant theories is well supported.

William King mentions two possibilities: the "Prince that Built Colchester" and a 12th-century cloth merchant from Reading named Cole-brook. Sir Walter Scott thought that "Auld King Coul" was Cumhall, the father of the giant Fyn M'Coule (Finn McCool). Other modern sources suggest (without much justification) that he was Richard Cole (1568–1614) of Bucks in the parish of Woolfardisworthy on the north coast of Devon, whose monument and effigy survive in All Hallows Church, Woolfardisworthy.

=== Coel Hen theory ===
It is often noted that the name of the legendary Welsh king Coel Hen can be translated 'Old Cole' or 'Old King Cole'. This sometimes leads to speculation that he, or some other Coel in Roman Britain, is the model for Old King Cole of the nursery rhyme. However, there is no documentation of a connection between the fourth-century figures and the eighteenth-century nursery rhyme. There is also a dubious connection of Old King Cole to Cornwall and King Arthur found at Tintagel Castle that there was a Cornish King or Lord Coel.

Further speculation connects Old King Cole and thus Coel Hen to Colchester, but in fact Colchester was not named after Coel Hen. Connecting with the musical theme of the nursery rhyme, according to a much later source, Coel Hen supposedly had a daughter who was skilled in music, according to Geoffrey of Monmouth, writing in the 12th century.

A legend that King Coel of Colchester was the father of the Empress Saint Helena, and therefore the grandfather of Constantine the Great, appeared in Henry of Huntingdon's Historia Anglorum and Geoffrey of Monmouth's Historia Regum Britanniae. The passages are clearly related, even using some of the same words, but it is not clear which version was first. Henry appears to have written the relevant part of the Historia Anglorum before he knew about Geoffrey's work, leading J. S. P. Tatlock and other scholars to conclude that Geoffrey borrowed the passage from Henry, rather than the other way around. The source of the claim is unknown, but may have predated both Henry and Geoffrey. Diana Greenway proposes it came from a lost hagiography of Helena; Antonia Harbus suggests it came instead from oral tradition.

=== "Old Cole" theory ===
In the 19th century William Chappell, an expert on popular music, suggested that "Old King Cole" was probably derived from "Old Cole", a nickname that was used many times in Elizabethan theatre, though its meaning is now unclear.

"Old Cole" probably originated from Thomas Deloney's Pleasant History of Thomas of Reading (c. 1598), about Thomas Cole, a fictional cloth merchant during the reign of Henry I from Reading, who was known as Old Cole throughout the book. In the story, Cole became extremely wealthy, but was killed by an innkeeper at Colnbrook who disposed of Cole's body in the Colne Brook river – the story concludes with the lines "And some say, that the river whereinto Cole was cast, did ever since carry the name of Cole, being called The river of Cole, and the Towne of Colebrooke".

== "Old King Coal" ==
In political cartoons and similar material, especially in Great Britain, sometimes Old King "Coal" (note the spelling difference) has been used to symbolize the coal industry. One such instance is the folk song "Old King Coal" (different than "Old King Cole", Roud 1164), which was written by English folk musician John Kirkpatrick in 1994. It presents Old King Coal as "a kind of modernization of John Barleycorn", with the chorus being:

There's fire in the heart of Old King Coal
There's the strength of centuries in his soul
There's a power that grows where his black blood flows
So here's to Old King Coal

== Modern usage ==
"Old King Cole" is often referred to in popular culture.

=== In art ===
The Maxfield Parrish mural Old King Cole (1894) for the Mask and Wig Club was sold by Christie's for $662,500 in 1996. Parrish executed a second Old King Cole (1906) for The Knickerbocker Hotel, which was moved to the St. Regis New York in 1948, and is the centerpiece of its King Cole Bar.

==== As a marching cadence ====
The United States military has used versions of the traditional rhyme in the form of marching cadences since at least the 1920s.

==== In music ====
"Old King Cole" was the subject of a 1923 one-act ballet by Ralph Vaughan Williams.

In 1960, a variation of the song was released on Harry Belafonte's live album Belafonte Returns to Carnegie Hall.

The first four lines of "Old King Cole" are quoted in the song "The Musical Box" by Genesis, on their third album, Nursery Cryme, released in 1971.

The melody is also used in the song "Great King Rat" by Queen on their eponymous debut album Queen (1973), with the lyrics adapted to: "Great King Rat was a dirty old man, And a dirty old man was he, Now what did I tell you? Would you like to see?"

The jazz musician Nathaniel Coles took the name Nat King Cole.

"Old Queen Cole" was the name of a song by Ween that appears on their album GodWeenSatan: The Oneness. The title and lyrics suggest a reference to the nursery rhyme.

"Old King Cole" is the antagonist of the album Once Upon A Time (In Space) by The Mechanisms, a cabaret-style story album based on European fairy tales told through English folk music.

=== In poetry ===
In John Agard's 2007 Checking Out Me History, "ole King Cole" is referenced as a historical figure that the speaker is told of. He is said to be a "merry ole soul"

=== In fiction ===
In his 1897 collection Mother Goose in Prose, L. Frank Baum included a story explaining the background to the nursery rhyme. In this version, Cole is a donkey-riding commoner who is selected at random to succeed the King of Whatland when the latter dies without heir.

In P. L. Travers' Mary Poppins Opens the Door, the titular character tells her charges a story about how King Cole remembered that he was a merry old soul.

James Joyce made reference to the rhyme in Finnegans Wake (619.27f): "With pipe on bowl. Terce for a fiddler, sixt for makmerriers, none for a Cole." Joyce is also punning on the canonical hours tierce (3), sext (6), and nones (9), in "Terce ... sixt ... none", and on Fionn MacCool and his Fianna, in "fiddlers ... makmerriers ... Cole".

The Old King Cole theme appeared twice in two cartoons released in 1933. Walt Disney made a Silly Symphony cartoon, Old King Cole, in which the character holds a huge party where various nursery rhyme characters are invited. Walter Lantz produced an Oswald cartoon the same year, The Merry Old Soul, which refers to the nursery rhyme.

Old King Cole makes an appearance in the 1938 Merrie Melodies short film Have You Got Any Castles.

The Three Stooges' 1948 short film Fiddlers Three features Larry, Moe and Shemp as musicians in King Cole's court, who must stop an evil wizard from stealing the king's daughter.

In the Fables comic book series, King Cole is depicted as the long-time mayor of Fabletown.

In the fifteenth season of Dropout's tabletop role-playing game show Dimension 20, Old King Cole is a character who was once the king of the kingdom of Jubilee.

=== In humour and satire ===
G. K. Chesterton wrote a poem, "Old King Cole: A Parody", which presented the nursery rhyme successively in the styles of several poets: Alfred, Lord Tennyson, W. B. Yeats, Robert Browning, Walt Whitman, and Algernon Charles Swinburne. Much later, Mad ran a feature similarly postulating classical writers' treatments of fairy tales. The magazine had Edgar Allan Poe tackle "Old King Cole", resulting in a cadence similar to that of "The Bells":

Old King Cole was a merry old soul
Old King Cole, Cole, Cole, Cole, Cole, Cole, Cole.

== Notes ==
=== References ===
- Henry of Huntingdon (1996). Greenway, Diana (ed.). Historia Anglorum: The History of the English People. Oxford University Press. ISBN 0-19-822224-6.
- Harbus, Antonina (2002). Helena of Britain in Medieval Legend. D. S. Brewer. ISBN 0859916251.
