= Judith Ackland =

British painter

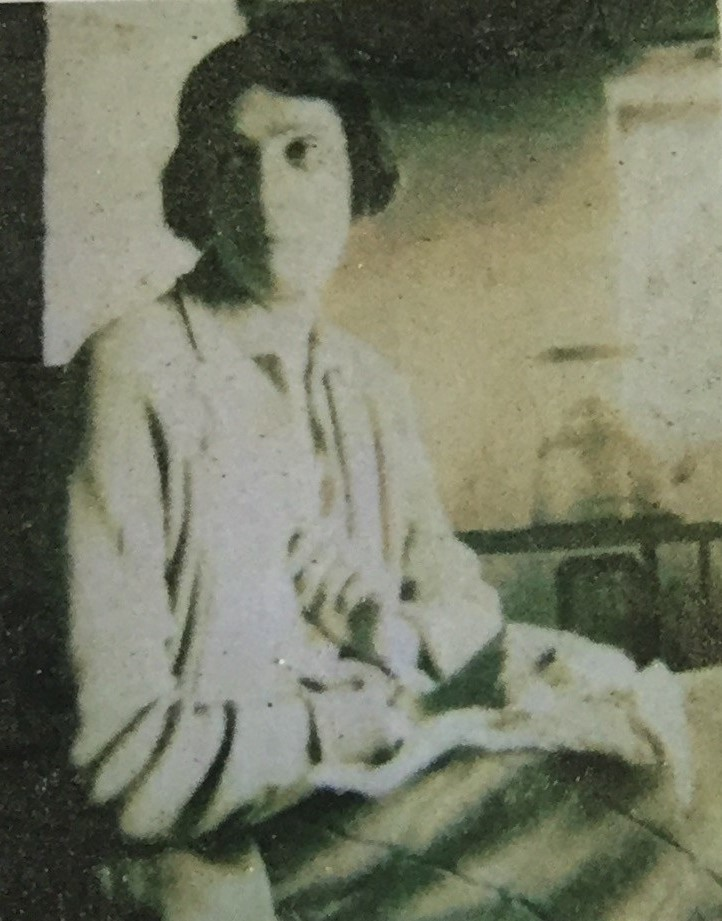
- Judith Ackland, c.1930s
- Born: 1892; Bideford, Devon
- Died: 1971 (aged 78–79)
- Known for: Landscape painting, dioramas
- Partner: Mary Stella Edwards

Judith Ackland (1892–1971) was an English artist, a landscape painter and creator of dioramas.

== Biography ==
Judith Agnes Maud Ackland was born at Stowford House on Bideford Strand in 1892, the daughter of Charles Kingsley Ackland, a well-known doctor from Bideford, Devon.

She studied art at the Bideford Art School and then moved to The Regent Street Polytechnic (now part of the University of Westminster) where she met fellow student Mary Stella Edwards (1893–1989). They became life partners and used a tiny cabin, a former fisherman's store, dating from the mid-19th century, at Bucks Mills as their studio from 1924 until Ackland's death in 1971. The cabin had initially been rented by Ackland's mother in 1913; Ackland replaced her mother as tenant in 1938 and bought the cabin in 1948 for £625 (£19,648 in 2025 sterling).

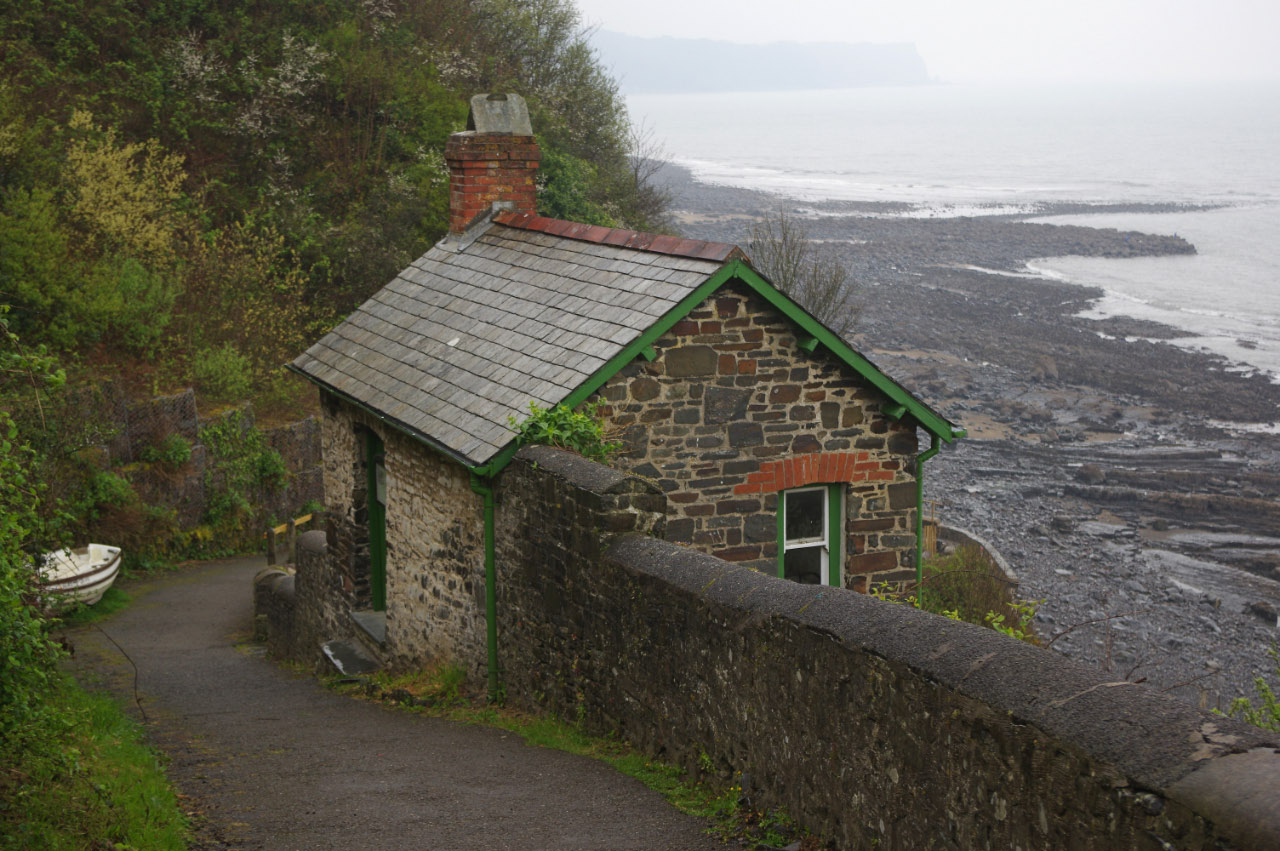
Bucks Mills Cabin

Ackland painted watercolours, mostly of the surrounding coast and countryside of Bideford, but they also travelled and worked widely. Together with Edwards, she produced dioramas, Ackland made all the models (she invented a method called "Jackanda" to make the models), and Edwards painted their backdrops. The town of Windsor commissioned these dioramas to celebrate important moments in its history, including a large-scale piece showing scenes of the Golden Jubilee celebrations of George III in 1809 with figures of the royal family whose portraits are based on paintings in the Royal Collection. The dioramas are now at the Windsor's Community Museum.

== Legacy ==
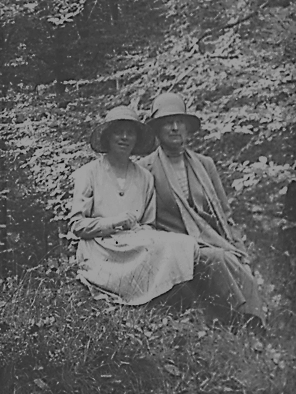
Mary Stella Edwards and Judith Ackland at Bucks Mills, 1924

Mary Stella Edwards donated a collection of her own and Ackland's work to Burton Art Gallery and Museum in Bideford, dating between 1913 and 1965.

Works by Ackland and Edwards can be found at the Victoria and Albert Museum, the Museum of London, Amgueddfa Cymru – Museum Wales and Abbot Hall Art Gallery in Kendal, Westmorland.

Bucks Mills Cabin, originally managed by the Ackland-Edwards Charitable Trust, passed to The National Trust in 2004. It is a Grade II listed building under the Planning Act 1990 as amended for its special architectural or historic interest, a time box of life at Bucks Mills in the middle of the 20th century. As agreed with the Ackland-Edwards Charitable Trust, it is currently artist–in–residence summer home and occasionally open to public. Listed in 2017, the Cabin is one of the England's landmarks to be given listed status as part of a "queer histories" project.

== Exhibitions ==
- The Boston Marriage of Judith Ackland and Mary Stella Edwards: watercolourists and diorama makers, 20th Annual Lesbian Lives Conference, 15–16 February 2013, Brighton
