= Richard Cole (died 1614) =

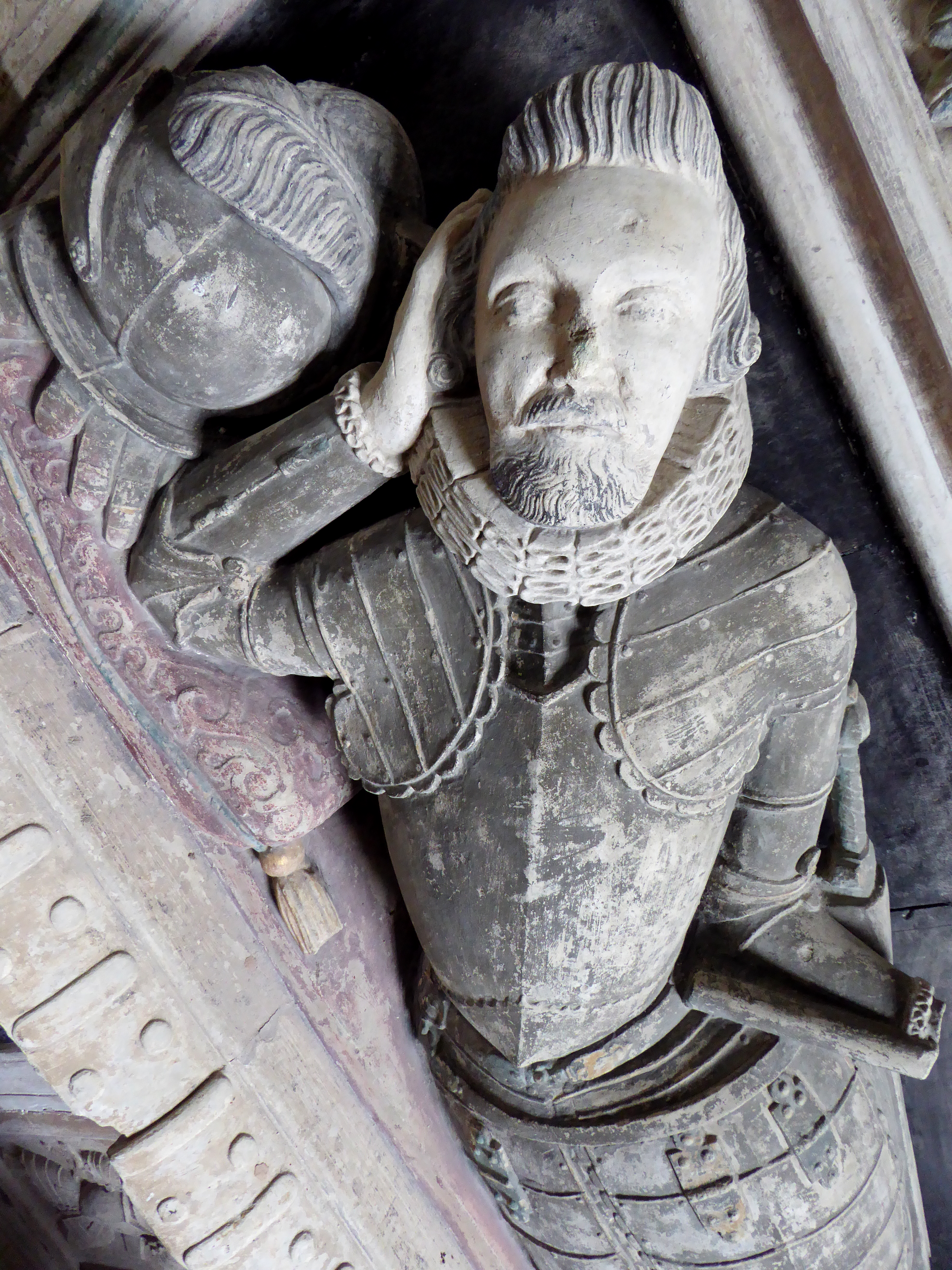
Effigy of Richard Cole, All Hallows Church, Woolfardisworthy

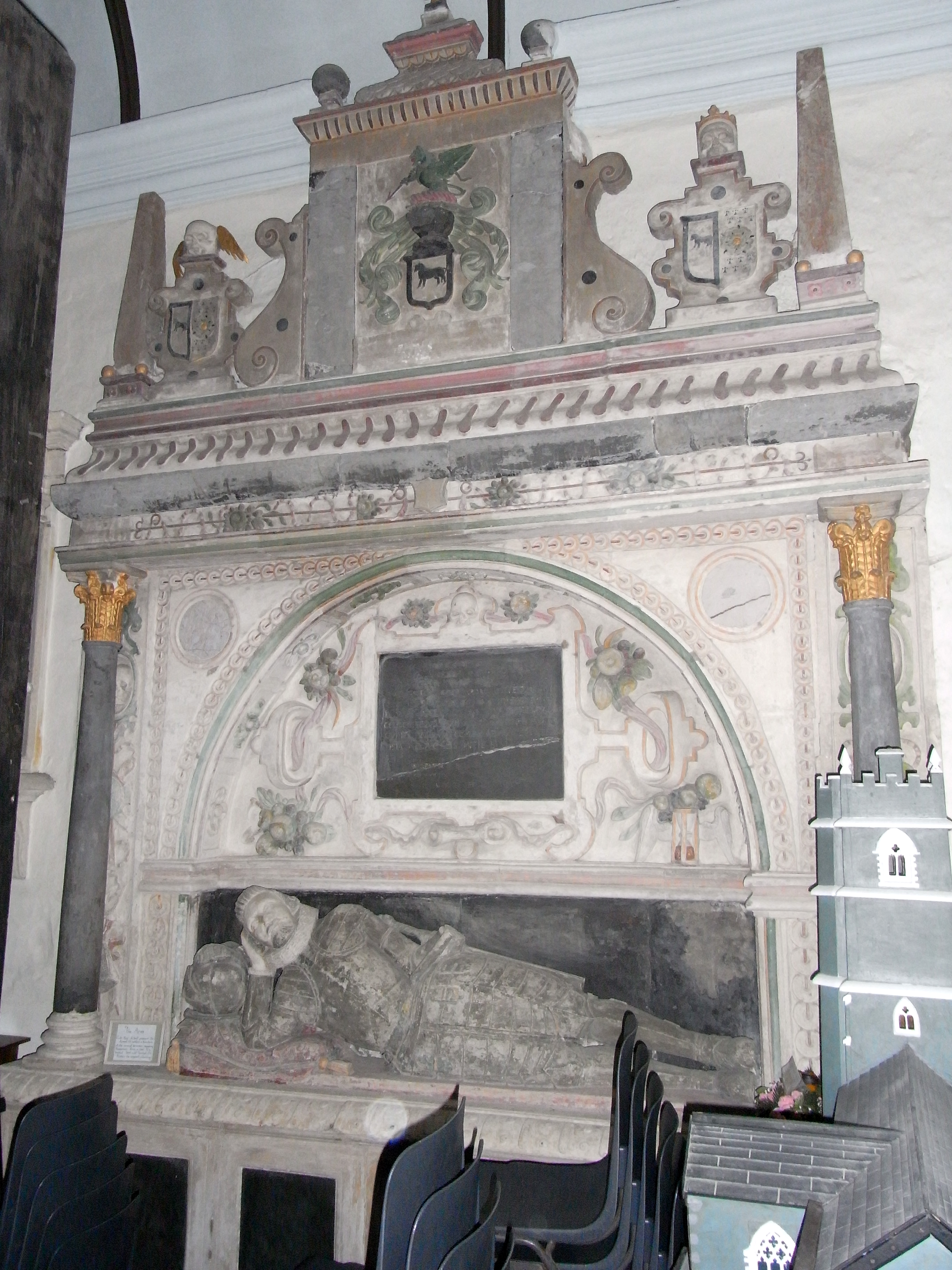
Monument to Richard Cole in All Hallows Church, Woolfardisworthy

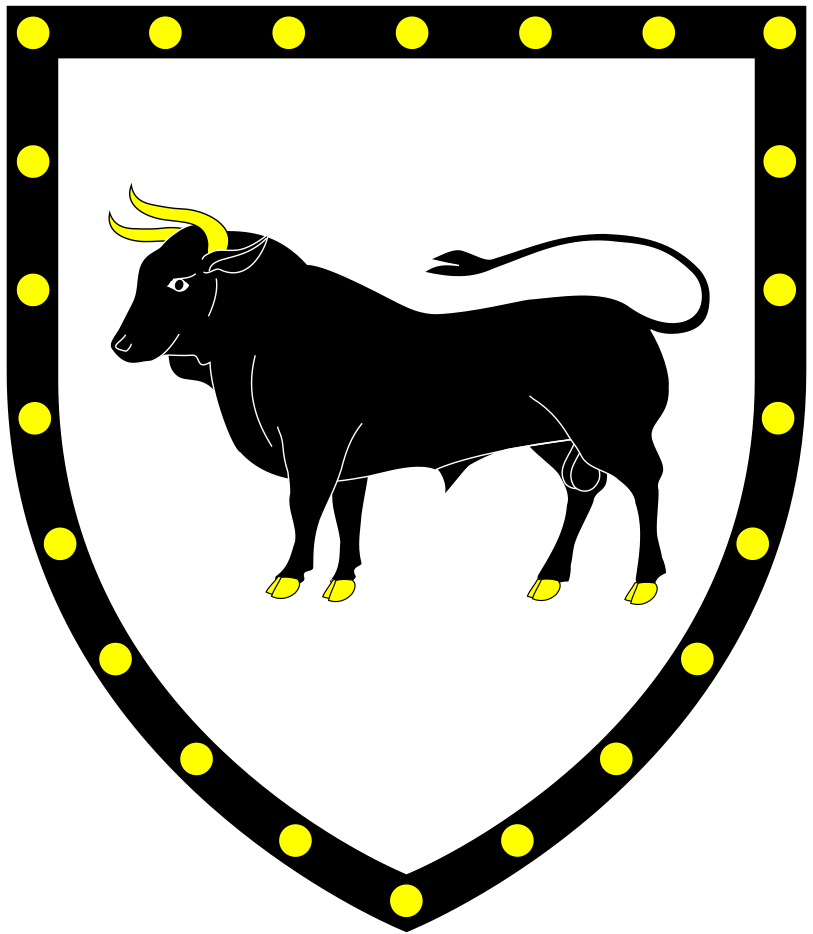
Arms of Cole: Argent, a bull passant sable armed or a bordure of the second bezantée

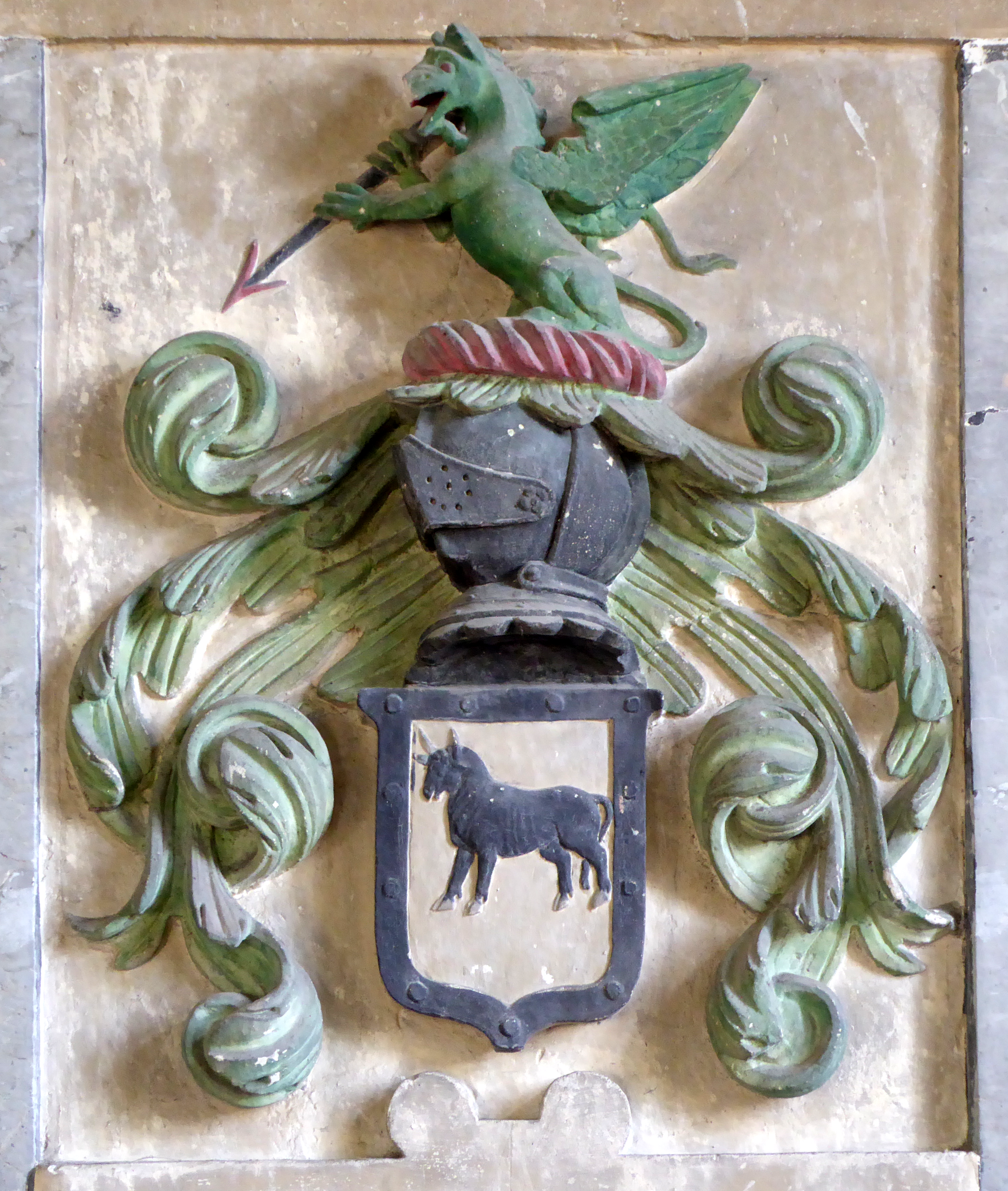
Heraldic achievement of Richard Cole, detail from top of his monument. The gold bezants in the bordure have been overpainted black

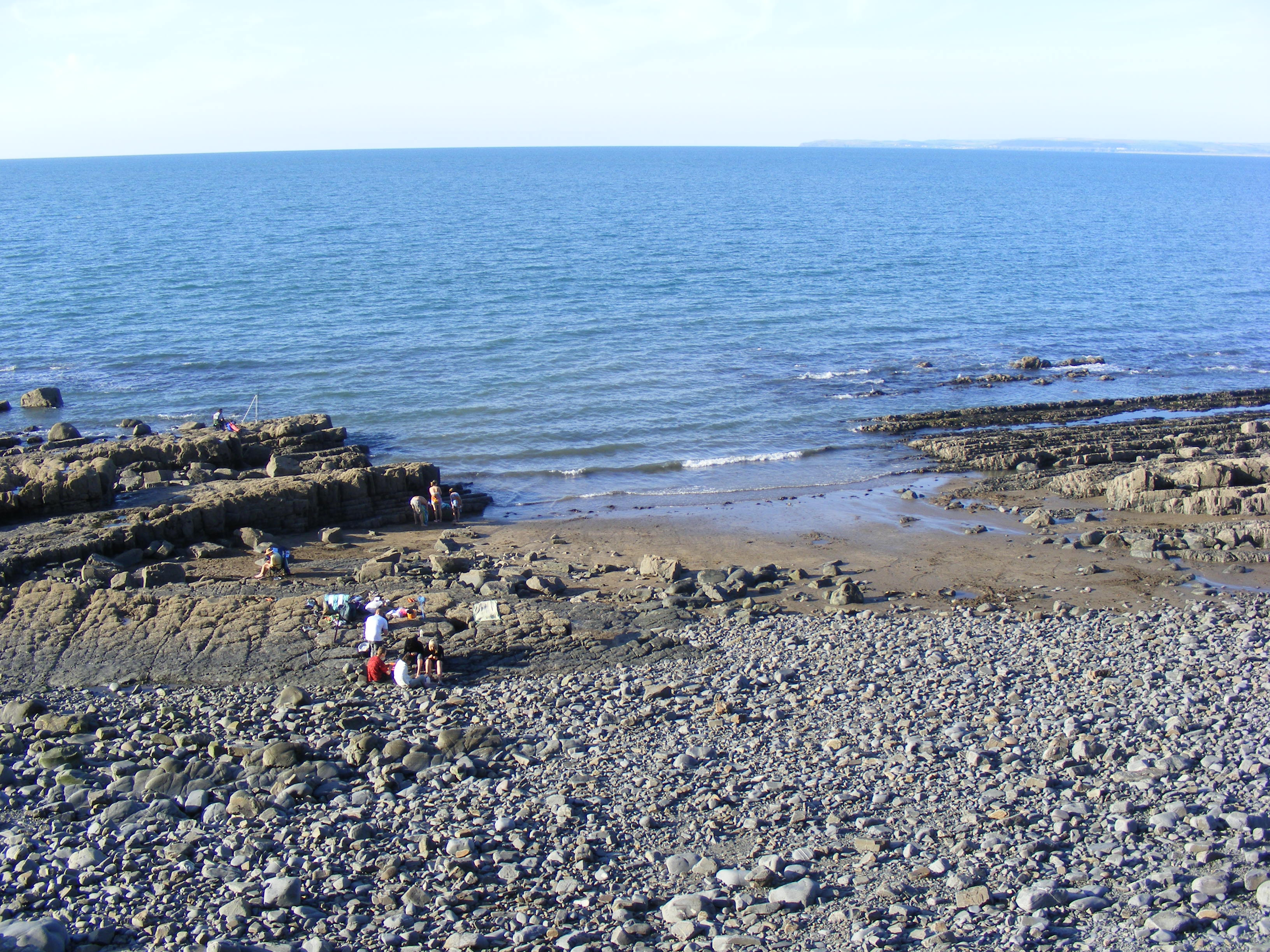
"The Gut" at Bucks Mills, a rudimentary harbour created by Richard Cole by blasting with gunpowder

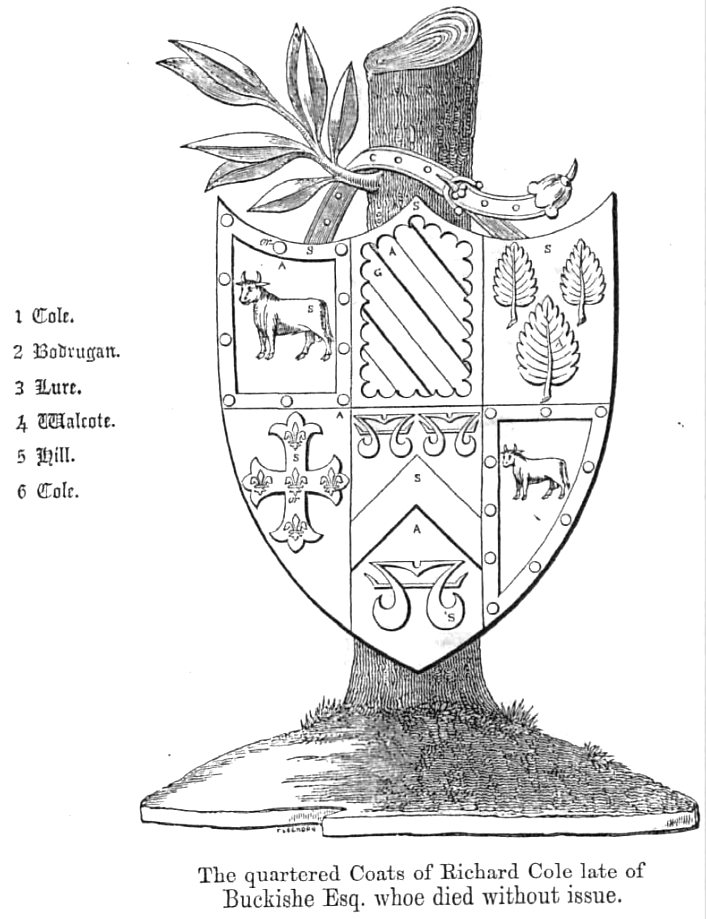
Quartered arms of Richard Cole, from a pedigree by William Segar (d.1633), Garter King of Arms

Richard Cole (1568 – 19 April 1614) of Bucks (anciently Bokish, Buckish, Bochewis, Bokeishe etc., now represented by Bucks Mills and Bucks Cross) in the parish of Woolfardisworthy in North Devon, and of Slade in the parish of Cornwood, South Devon, was a member of the Devonshire gentry whose large monument with effigy survives in All Hallows Church, Woolfardisworthy. Certain modern sources link him (without much justification) to Old King Cole in the synonymous Nursery rhyme.

== Origins ==
He was the son and heir of Philip Cole (1539–1596) of Slade by his wife Jane Williams (died 1633), second daughter of Thomas Williams of Stowford. He was a descendant of the Cole family of Nethway in the parish of Brixham in Devon (about 19 miles south east of Slade), one of whom was John Cole (born c.1376), twice a Member of Parliament for Devon, in 1417 and 1423 and Sheriff of Devon 1405–6. His distant cousins were the Cole family elevated to the peerage of Ireland successively as Baron Mount Florence (1760), Viscount Enniskillen (1776) and Earl of Enniskillen (1789), descended from Cole of Nethway and Slade, still extant today.

== Career ==
=== Builds harbour at Bucks ===
Few records of his life survive. His near contemporary the Devonshire historian Tristram Risdon (died 1640) (whose grandfather lived nearby at Bableigh, Parkham, 2 1/2 miles to the south-east of Bucks) stated of him: "Richard Cole, the last of that family that dwelt at Bokish, erected a harbour in his land, there to shelter ships and boats". This is now known as the Old Quay at Bucks Mills, and was built after he had blasted out the rock with gunpowder to leave a sandy inlet known as "The Gut" or "Gutway". Remains of the quay are visible at low-tide. It was built at about the same time as his near neighbour George Cary (1543–1601), lord of the manor of Clovelly, Sheriff of Devon in 1587, built a harbour wall at Clovelly surviving today, 3 miles further west along the coast from Bucks, described by Risdon as "a pile to resist the inrushing of the sea's violent breach, that ships and boats may with the more safety harbour there". Clovelly's main export product was herring fish, which formerly appeared at certain times of the year in huge shoals, close off-shore in the shallow waters of the Bristol Channel, and such a harbour wall was a great benefit to the village fishermen, tenants of the Cary lords of the manor.

=== Supplies weaponry ===
Richard Cole supplied weaponry to the parish armoury of nearby Hartland. From the reign of King Edward I (1272-1307) every parish in England was obliged by law to keep ready for use a certain amount of armour, usually referred to as "Church Armour", and kept in the parish church or town hall. The parish records of Hartland for 1598-9 contain the following two entries relating to Cole:

- Paid to Richard Cole, Esquior, for a Corslett for the church...xxv shillings
- Paid to the said Richard Cole, Esqr, for one hundred poundes of gunpowder for the parish£...v.

=== Sells Slade ===
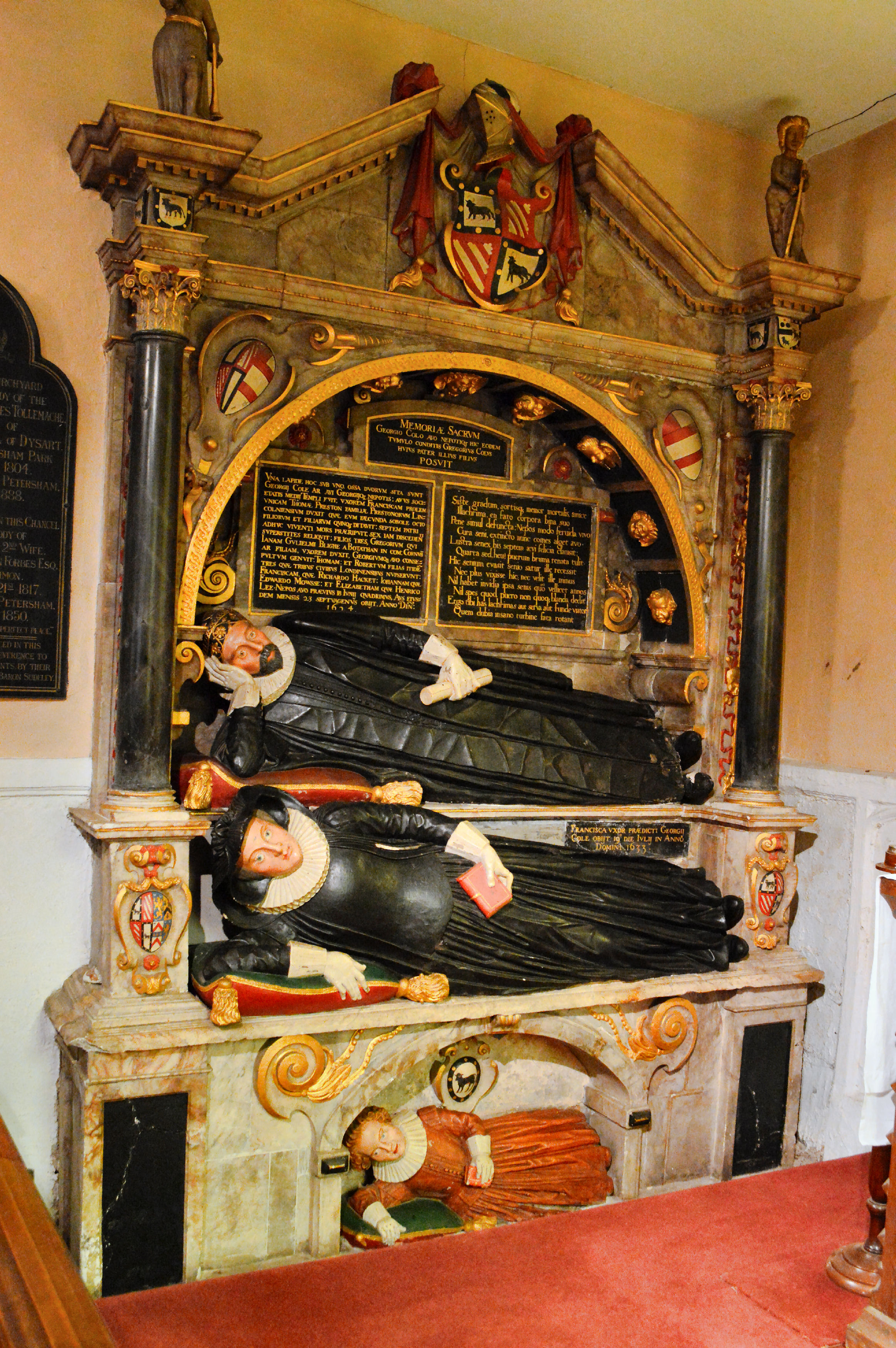
Monument in Petersham Church in Surrey of George Cole (d.1624) of the Middle Temple, father of Gregory Cole (d.1660), 2nd cousin and heir of Richard Cole (d.1614) of Bucks

According to the Devonshire historian Risdon (died 1640), Richard Cole sold the estate of Slade, which had been the seat of his Cole ancestors from the reign of King Edward II (1307–1327), which soon afterwards became a seat of the Savery family. According to the Devonshire historian Pole (d.1635), Richard Cole "conveyed this land" (i.e. Bucks and Wallen) "unto .... Cole of London, as I have bine enformed". This was his second cousin Gregory Cole (d.1660), a lawyer of the Middle Temple, and of Petersham in Surrey, who founded a second line of the Cole family at Bucks and at Enstone in Oxfordshire. The large and elaborate monument of George Cole (d.1624) of the Middle Temple, Gregory's father, survives in Petersham Church. The estate of Bucks remained in the Cole family until 1802, on the death at the age of 96 of Rev. Potter Cole (1705-1802), a grandson of Gregory Cole and the last in the male line, Rector of Hawksbury in Gloucestershire for over seventy years. Potter Cole bequeathed Bucks to his nephew Rev. William Loggin of Long Marston in Gloucestershire, who in accordance with the bequest assumed the name and arms of Cole by Act of Parliament on 26 June 1802, and was the father of the Rev. William Loggin, the owner of Bucks in 1822.

== Marriage ==
In 1590 at Penkevil in Cornwall he married Radigan (alias Radagand, etc.) Boscawen, second daughter of Nicholas Boscawen (died 1626) of Penkevil. Her brother Hugh Boscawen (1578–1641) of Penkevil was Recorder of Truro in Cornwall and was the grandfather of Hugh Boscawen, 1st Viscount Falmouth (c. 1680 – 1734). The arms of Cole impaling Boscawen (Ermine, a rose gules barbed and seeded proper) are displayed twice on top of his monument in Woolfardisworthy Church. The marriage was without progeny. Radigan survived her husband and remarried (as his second wife) to Sir William Cooke (1574–1619) of Highnam in Gloucestershire, Member of Parliament, which marriage was also without progeny. However, she was clearly popular with her two Cooke step-daughters (namely Elizabeth Scudamore of Kentchurch Court in Herefordshire and Ann Ball wife of Peter Ball (died 1680), MP, of Mamhead in Devon) who each named one of their daughters "Radagand" after her.

== Death and succession ==
He died without progeny on 19 April 1614, "having long languished" as he wrote in his will dated 7 January 1612. Legend however states that he was either killed fighting pirates near Bucks Mills, or was killed together with many others at a battle at Bitworthy, near Bucks, the site of which is memorialised by a field named "Bloody Park". It is believed that a survivor from this battle sought refuge in Woolfardisworthy Church, but died from his wounds in the churchyard, having buried his "small framed cross" in the graveyard. This cross was discovered many years later by a vicar's daughter, but was lost in 1993. A field between Bucks and Woolfardisworthy Church has the ancient name "Paradise", where it is believed a communal graveyard exists for all the men killed at Bitworthy. Another story explaining the existence of the cross found in the graveyard is that it came from a Spanish sailor whose warship in the Spanish Armada had been wrecked in a storm off the coast in 1588, who similarly attempted unsuccessfully to reach the sanctuary of the church.

== Monument ==
His large monument with semi-recumbent effigy dressed in armour survives in All Hallows Church, Woolfardisworthy. The monument was said in 1978 to retain the original paintwork. The Latin inscription etched onto a slate tablet is largely worn away.
