= Victoria Park, Bideford =

Public park in Devon, England

Victoria Park
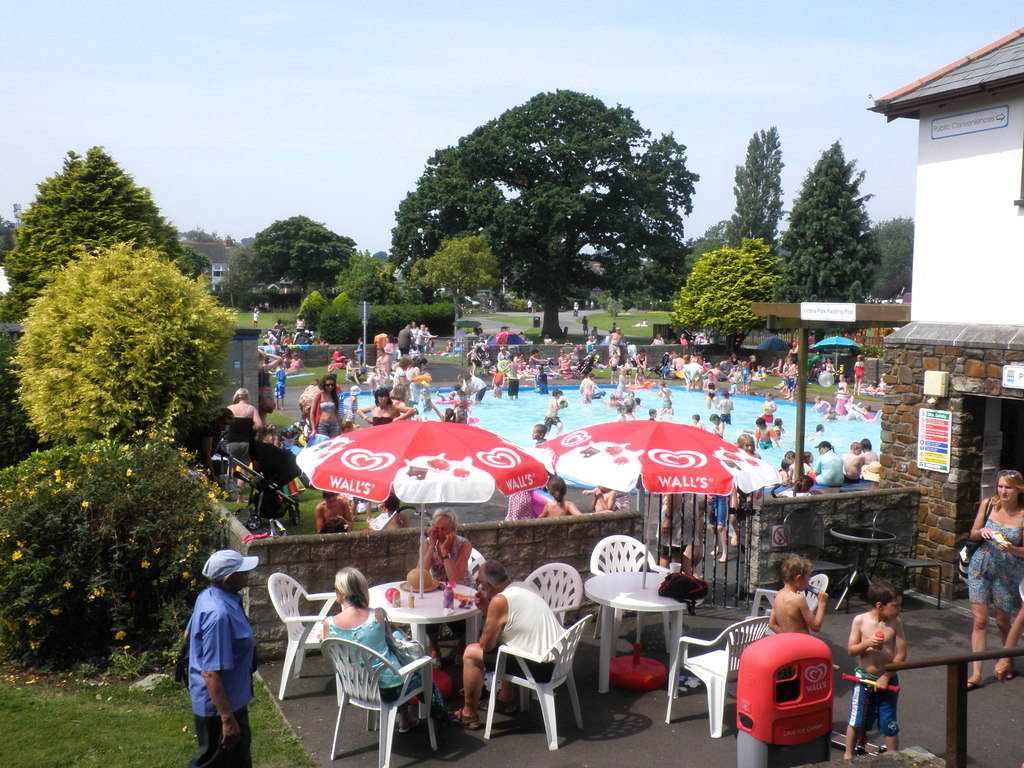
- Paddling pool
- Interactive map of Victoria Park
- Type: Urban park
- Location: Bideford
- Coordinates: 51.0215°N 4.2058°W
- Created: 1912
- Operator: Bideford Town Council
- Open: All year
- Website: www.bideford-tc.gov.uk/visitor-info-our-neighbours/around-bideford/victoria-park

Victoria Park is an urban park in Bideford, Devon, England. The park opened in 1912 to celebrate the reign of Queen Victoria, the gates erected for the opening are listed with Historic England. There is a bandstand surrounded by nine cannons and facilities including rugby and cricket.

== History ==
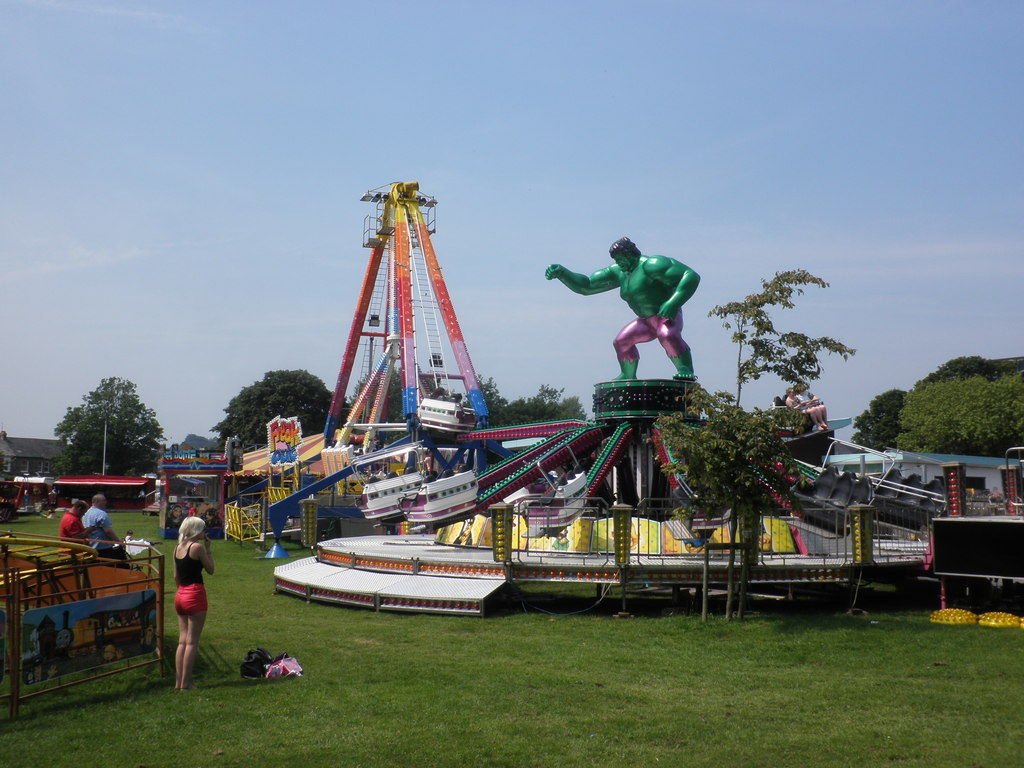
Funfair

The park opened in 1912 to celebrate Queen Victoria's reign. In 1944 an oak tree was planted to celebrate the good relations between the people of Bideford and US Army personnel who were stationed in the town between 1940 and 1944. Rose beds were dedicated to Princess Diana after her burial and in 2000 a Millennium Time Capsule was put in the ground near the entrance.

== Landmarks ==
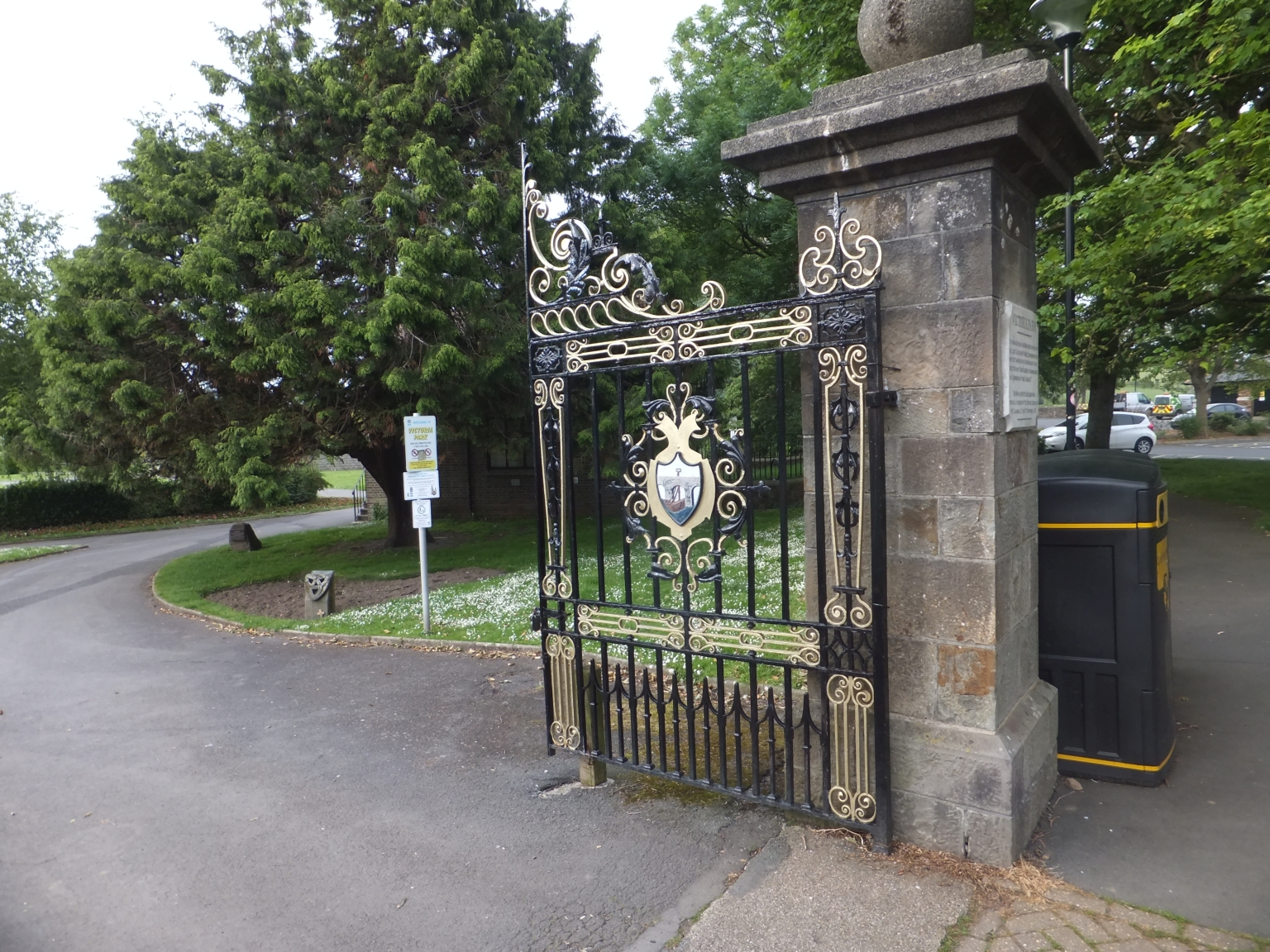
Park gates

The gates and gate piers at the entrance to the park are Grade II listed with Historic England. They were erected in 1912 for the opening of the park and have scrollwork and foliage. In the centre of each gate there is a cartouche showing the borough insignia. On the East pier there is a plaque noting the opening of the park on 9 November 1912 and saying the gates were given by Geo. Oliver Peard in memory of his wife.

The bandstand is surrounded by nine 16th century cannons. Richard Grenville after being in a ship battle in 1585 captured a Spanish ship called the Santa Maria de Vincente, which he took to Bideford and converted into an English ship called Galleon Dudley. The cannons from Santa Maria de San Vicente were discovered by the quayside of Bideford in 1895. They were later placed in the park and erroneously labelled 'Armada cannons'. The Galleon Dudley saw action against the Spanish Armada but the Santa Maria de Vincente cannons did not.

== Facilities ==
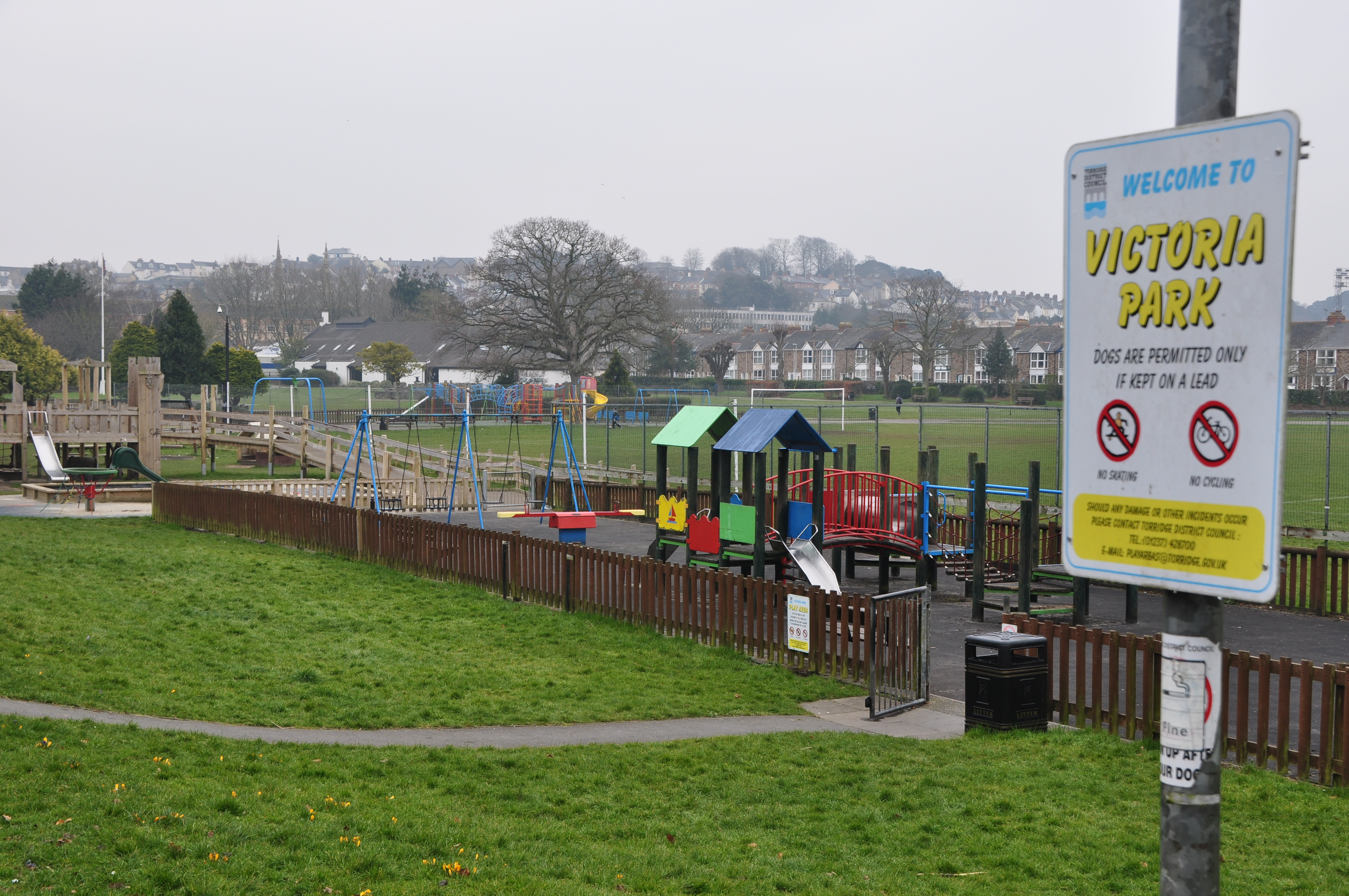
Playground

There is a bandstand, bowling greens, three children's playgrounds, an outdoor gym, a paddling pool, walking and picnicking. Bideford Rugby Club is based at the park, there is also a cricket club. Bideford Parkrun takes place in the park.

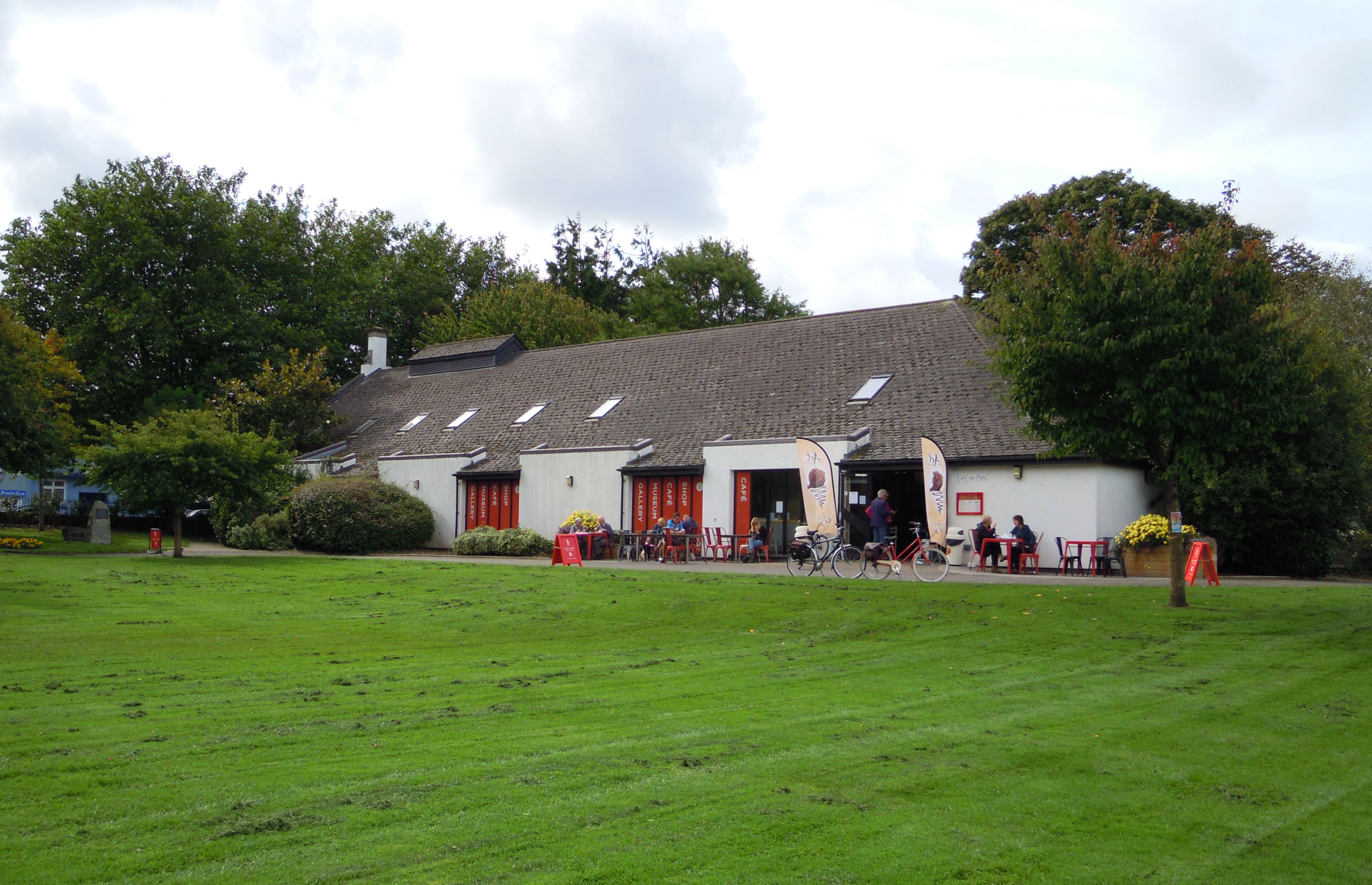
Burton at Bideford from Victoria Park

Burton at Bideford, an art gallery and museum, faces onto the park.
