= Edward Capern =

English poet 1819–1894

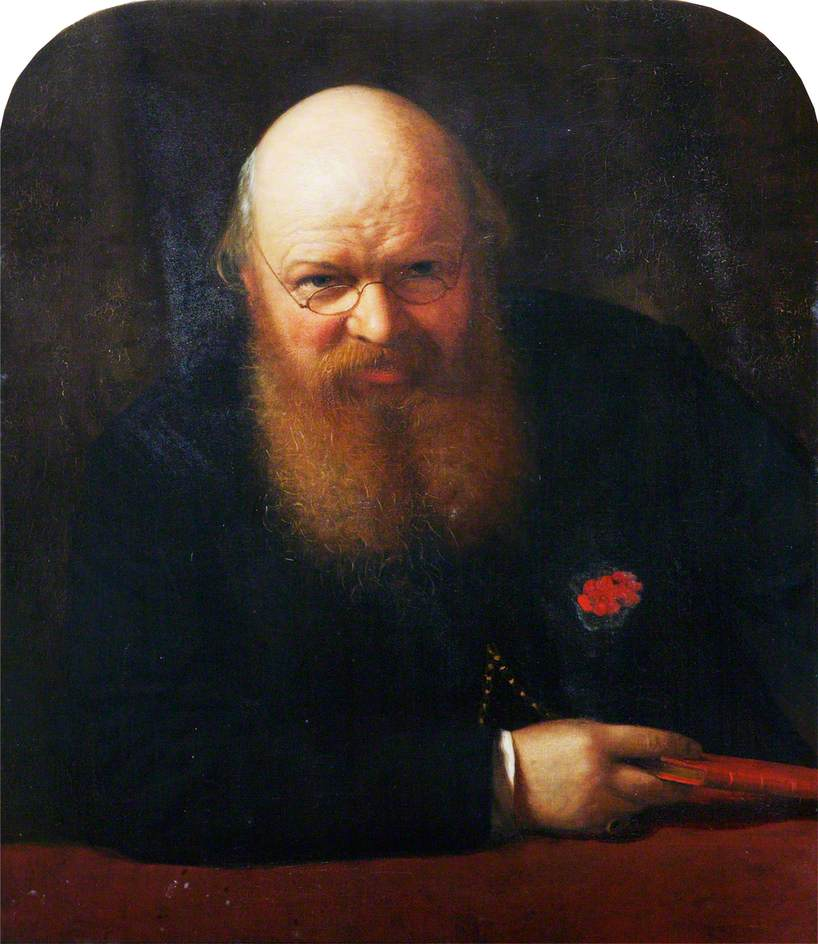
- Portrait in oils, by John Edgar Williams
- Born: 21 January 1819; Tiverton, Devonshire, England
- Died: 5 June 1894 (aged 75); Braunton
- Resting place: Heanton
- Occupations: poet, postman
- Writing career
- Language: English
- Genre: Poetry

Edward Capern (21 January 1819 – 5 June 1894), was an English poet, best known for The Devonshire Melodist and Wayside Warbles. He built up a strong reputation that persisted particularly in his native Devon.

== Early years ==
Capern was born at Tiverton on 21 January 1819. He was baptised at Tiverton Methodist Chapel on 14 February 1819. His father Edward was a baker. From an early age he worked in a lace factory.

His failing eyesight forced him to abandon this occupation in 1847 and he was in dire distress until in 1848 he secured appointment with the Post Office on a wage of 10s. 6d a week as a letter-carrier. His first route was between Bideford and Appledore, later between Bideford and Westleigh. His job required him to make a return trip between the two towns with a wait for two hours, to allow time for people to reply to letters he had just delivered (there were no post-boxes at that time). He used this time for his writings. Capern became known as "the Rural Postman of Bideford".

== Poetry ==
Capern began to write verse for the "Poet's Corner" of the North Devon Journal. His occasional poems soon struck popular fancy and were in great request at county gatherings. In 1856, William Frederick Rock of Barnstaple procured him a body of subscribers. Collected and published by subscription in 1856, it received warm praise from the reviews and from many distinguished people. Poems, by Edward Capern, was followed by Ballads and Songs (1858), The Devonshire Melodist (a collection of the author's songs, some of them to his own music) and Wayside Warbles (1865), and resulted in a civil list pension being granted to him by Lord Palmerston. His later work Sungleams and Shadows was published in 1881.

In retirement, in his sixties, Capern and his wife moved to Harborne (near Birmingham) to live closer to their son. During that period, he accompanied Elihu Burritt on walks round Birmingham and the Black Country, which Burritt wrote up as Walks in the Black Country.

Capern returned to Devonshire about 1884 and settled at Braunton, near Barnstaple, in North Devon. Greatly shocked by his wife's death in February 1894, he died on 4 June the same year and was buried in the churchyard at Heanton, near Braunton.

== Repute ==
Capern's local reputation continued after his death. Victor Canning, a thriller and travel writer, noted that Capern's "is better poetry than one would expect from a postman, and if it has a little breathlessness, then it shows how truly the postman who wrote it has worked his own personality into the lines." He added that Capern was known as the "Devonshire Burns".

The Burton at Bideford Museum in Bideford has a permanent exhibition about Capern.
