= Mermaid's Pool to Rowden Gut =

Protected area in Devon, England

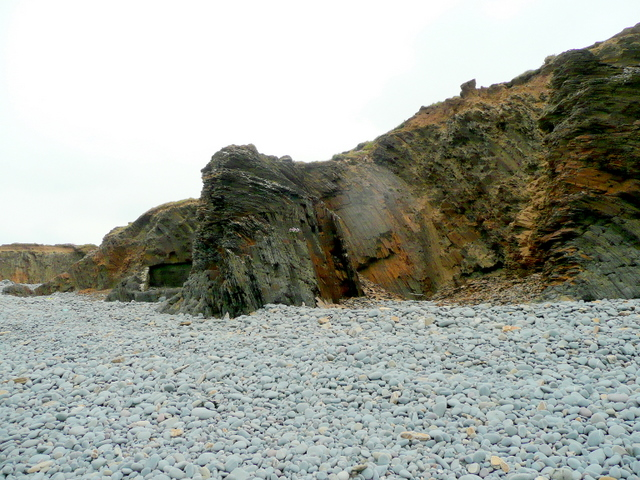
Abbotsham Cliff

Mermaid's Pool to Rowden Gut is a geological Site of Special Scientific Interest (SSSI) in north-western Devon in England. It comprises a 5.5km-long stretch of coast between Mermaid's Pool in the north-east and Rowden's Gut in the south-west. The sea cliffs expose the only available complete sequence through the Bideford Formation of the Culm Measures, which consists of alternating layers of mudstones, siltstones and sandstones that were deposited in a wide range of deltaic environments during the Carboniferous period. This site borders the Westward Ho! Cliffs SSSI to the north, while the coastline to the south-east continues to Peppercombe, and further into the Hobby to Peppercombe SSSI.

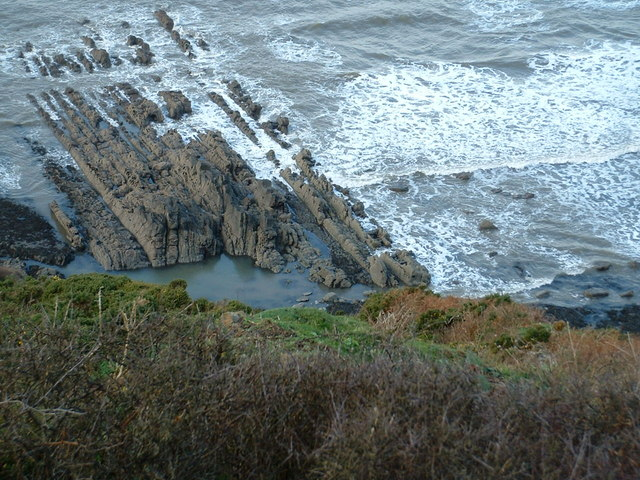
Mermaid's Pool is in the centre, with the sandstone reef behind.

Mermaid's Pool is a little pool in the shore platform a mile west of Westward Ho! It borders on a reef of hard sandstone which stands out against the surrounding gullies formed of easily eroded softer mudstone, now covered in algae. Several minor faults are visible along the length of the reef. There is bladder wrack growing in the area supporting a population of flat periwinkles, which are otherwise not found on the rocky platforms to the east in Westward Ho!

== Bibliography ==
- Keene, Janet (1985). Across the rocky shore at Westward Ho!. North Devon thematic coastal trail. Oxford: Geography Section, Oxford Polytechnic. ISBN 978-0-948444-03-6.
- Keene, Peter (2013). The north-west Devon coast: a celebration of cliffs and seashore from the Hartland Peninsula to the Taw-Torridge Estuary. Kingston Bagpuize, Oxfordshire: Thematic Trails. ISBN 978-0-948444-61-6.
- Nature England (2001). Mermaid's Pool to Rowden Gut (PDF) (Report).
- Thomas, J.M. (1982). "The Carboniferous rocks". In Durrance, E.M.; Laming, D.J.C. (eds.). The geology of Devon. Exeter University. ISBN 978-0-85989-247-6.
