= Mary Stella Edwards =

British artist

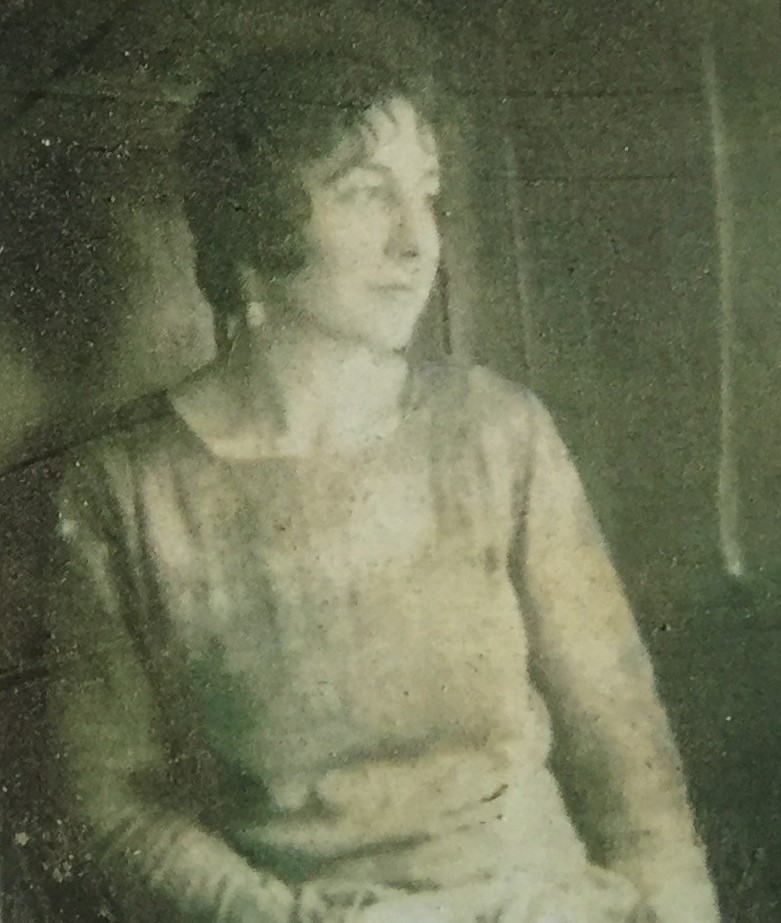
- Born: 1898; Hampstead, London
- Died: 1989 (aged 90–91); Staines, Middlesex
- Education: Royal College of Art; The Regent Street Polytechnic
- Known for: Painting, poetry

Mary Stella Edwards (1898–1989) was an English painter, creator of dioramas and poet.

== Biography ==
Mary Stella Edwards was born in Hampstead in 1898, the daughter of Robert Cromwell Edwards an architect. She grew up at 12 Fairfield Avenue, in Staines, Middlesex (now part of Surrey).

Edwards studied art at the Royal College of Art and The Regent Street Polytechnic (now part of the University of Westminster) where she met fellow student Judith Ackland. They became life partners and used a tiny cabin, a former fisherman's store, dating from the mid-19th century, at Bucks Mills as their studio from 1924 until Ackland's death in 1971.

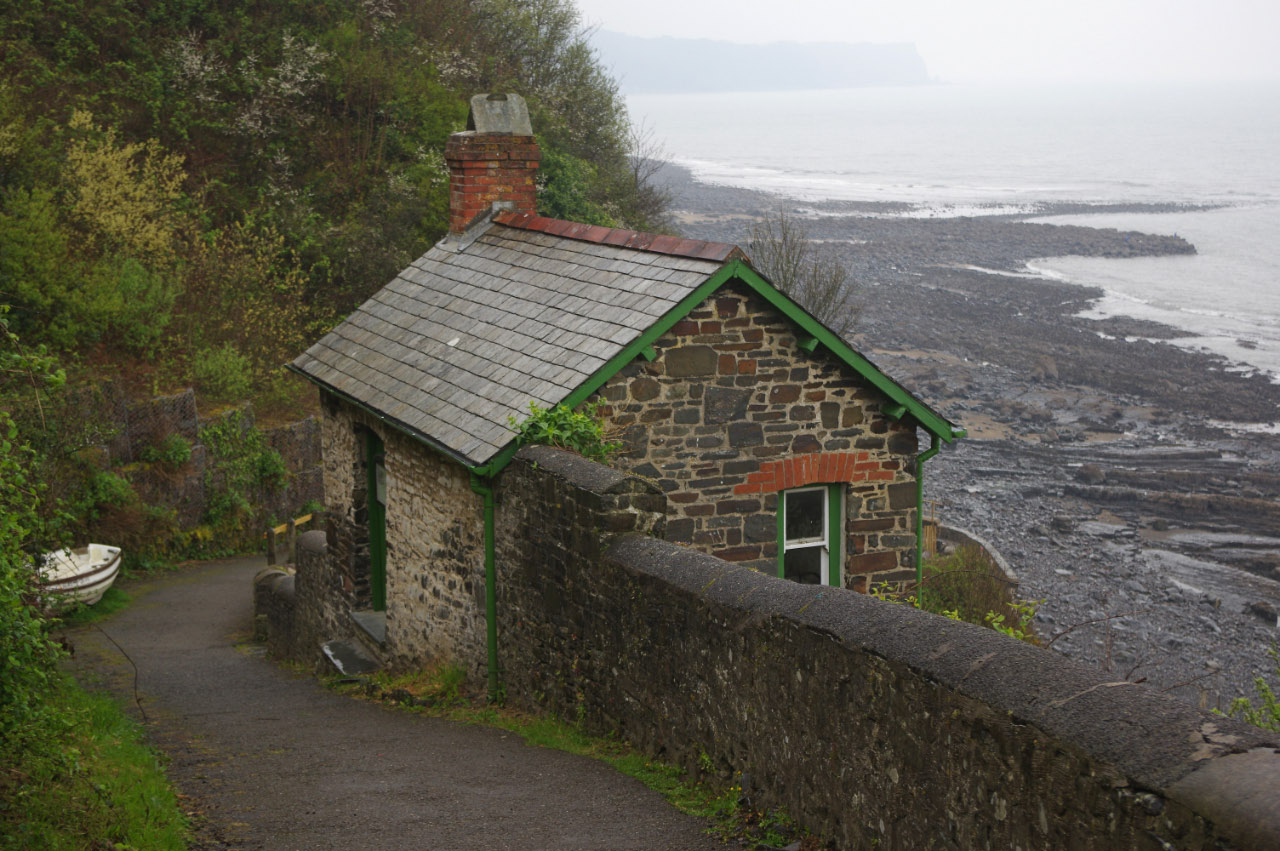
Bucks Mill Cabin

Together with Ackland, Edwards produced dioramas, Ackland made all the models (she invented a method called "Jackanda" to make the models), and Edwards painted their backdrops. The town of Windsor commissioned these dioramas to celebrate the town's history, and they are now at the Windsor & Royal Borough Museum.

Edwards was also a poet and published several volumes throughout her life. She published her first book of poetry Time and Chance in 1926 with the Hogarth Press of Leonard Woolf and Virginia Woolf; Gilbert Murray, philologist, wrote the introduction. The London antique dealer Maggs Bros Ltd has a copy Edwards dedicated to Irish publisher and book collector Alan Clodd, who in 1967 published her works with his Enitharmon Press. Individual poems subsequently appeared in Thomas Moult's The Best Poems of 1930, Art, Prose and Poetry, The Contemporary Review and The Living Age. She also published poetry between 1962 and 1964 in Literary Criticism Teaching edited by Margaret Willy for the Oxford University Press. In 1968 she published A Truce with Time and in 1978 Before and After, with poems in memory of her late partner, Judith Ackland: these poems, according to May Sarton, "express the long-standing affection and solidarity of these two remarkable women and give strength to make unbearable bearable". The volume was published by Enitharmon Press, as did Years Between (1982) and A Further Harvest (1985) with unpublished poems from the period between 1932 and 1984.

Edwards also illustrated books, mostly children's books, painted or drew the frontispiece and designed dust covers. Examples include: The Normal Saturday Fairy Book (1924), The Grand Buffalo (1926), From Track to Highway. A Book of British Roads (1935), Worzel Gummidge Or the Scarecrow of Scatterbrook (1936), Miss Milligan Comes Out (1937), The Muddle-Headed Postman and Other Stories (1937), The Giant Who Made Mistakes (1938) and The Dogs at Abbey Lodge (1937). In addition, she designed - as well as Nina Hamnett, among others - an envelope for the literary journal Coterie, in which the Sitwells, Huxley, Eliot and others published texts; critics thought the cover was too reminiscent of Beardsley.

Edwards' book covers from 1922 to 1938 include illustrations for authors such as Douglas Jerrold, Countess Barcynska, Henryk Sienkiewicz, Anatole France, Rufus King, G.B. Stern, Peggy Wood. After Ackland's death, Edwards closed The Cabin at Bucks Mill and moved to live with her family in Staines. She died in 1989.

== Exhibitions ==
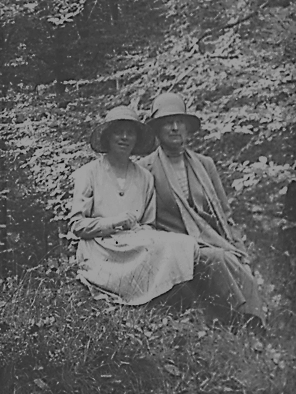
Mary Stella Edwards and Judith Ackland at Bucks Mills, 1924

- The Boston Marriage of Judith Ackland and Mary Stella Edwards: watercolourists and diorama makers, 20th Annual Lesbian Lives Conference, 15–16 February 2013, Brighton

== Legacy ==
Mary Stella Edwards donated a collection of her own and Ackland's work, dating from 1913 and 1965, to Burton Art Gallery and Museum in Bideford. Other works by Ackland and Edwards are held by the Victoria and Albert Museum, the Museum of London, Amgueddfa Cymru – Museum Wales and Abbot Hall Art Gallery in Kendal, Westmorland.

Bucks Mills Cabin, originally managed by the Ackland-Edwards Charitable Trust, passed to The National Trust in 2004. It is a Grade II listed building under the Planning Act 1990 as amended for its special architectural or historic interest. As agreed with the Ackland-Edwards Charitable Trust, it is an artist–in–residence summer home and occasionally open to public. Listed in 2017, the Cabin was one of Historic England's properties to be given listed status as part of a "queer histories" project.
