= Burton at Bideford =

Art gallery and museum in Bideford, Devon, England

Coordinates: 51.0213°N 4.2051°W

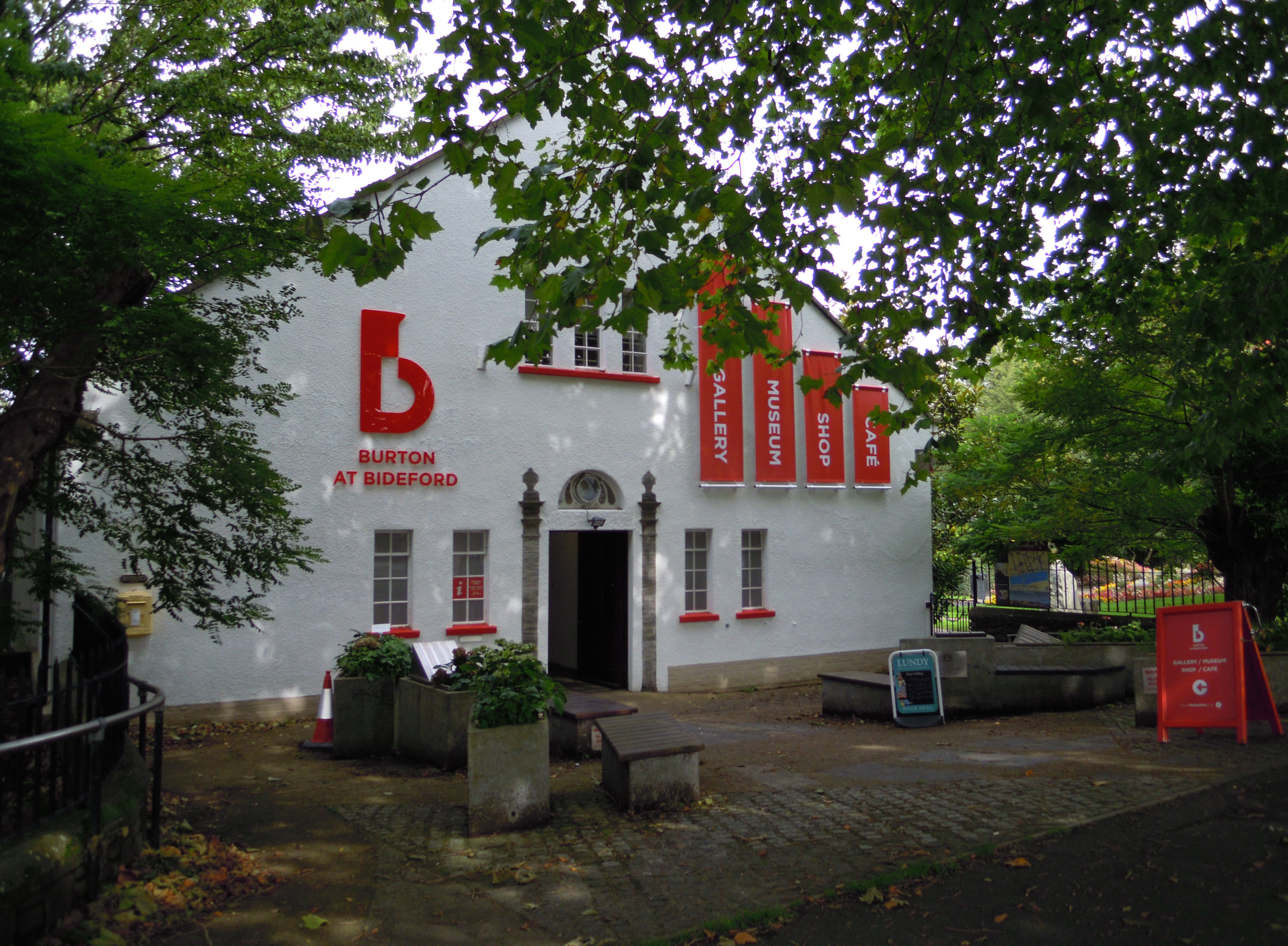
The Burton at Bideford Art Gallery & Museum

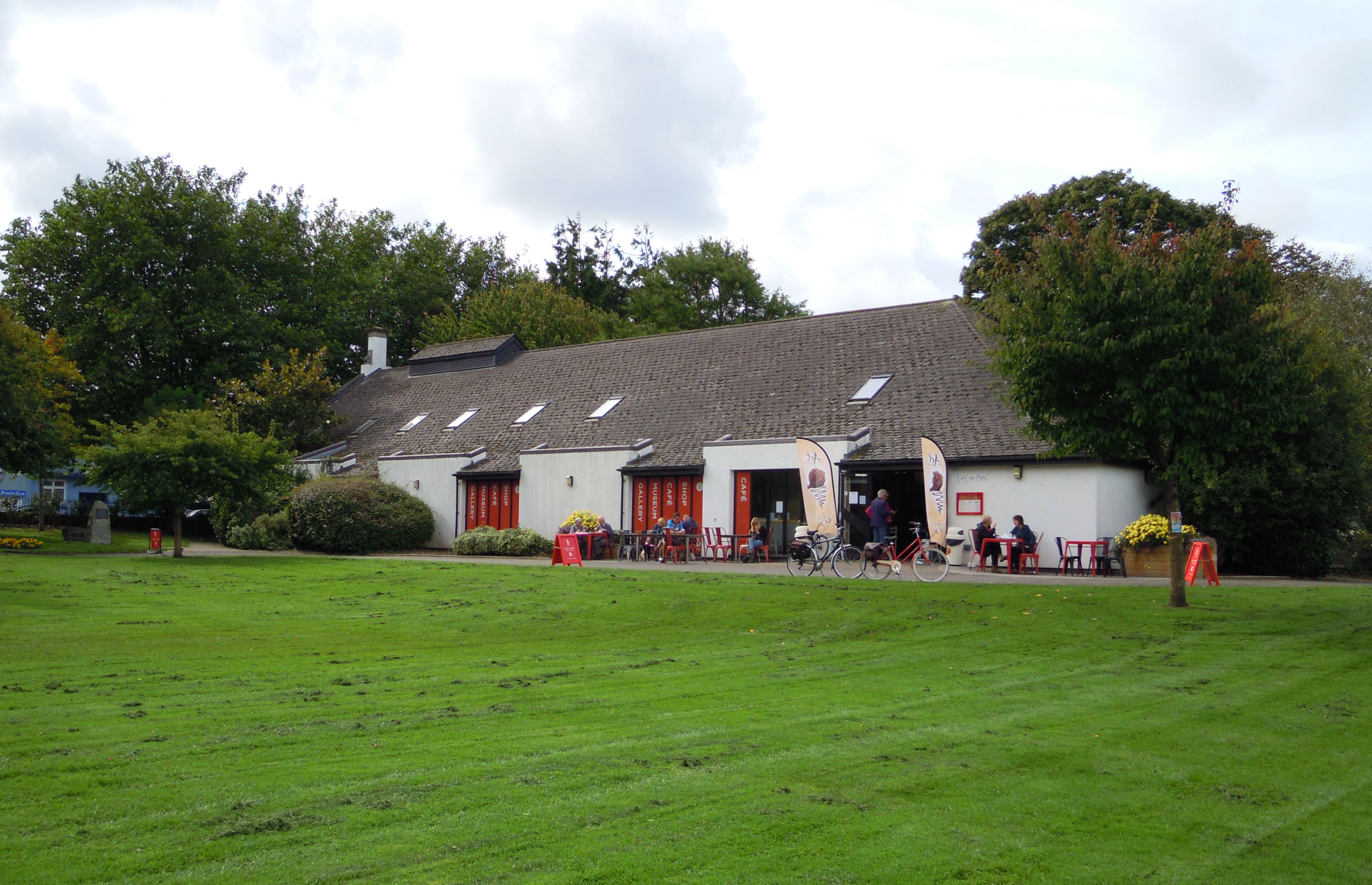
The Burton at Bideford from Victoria Park

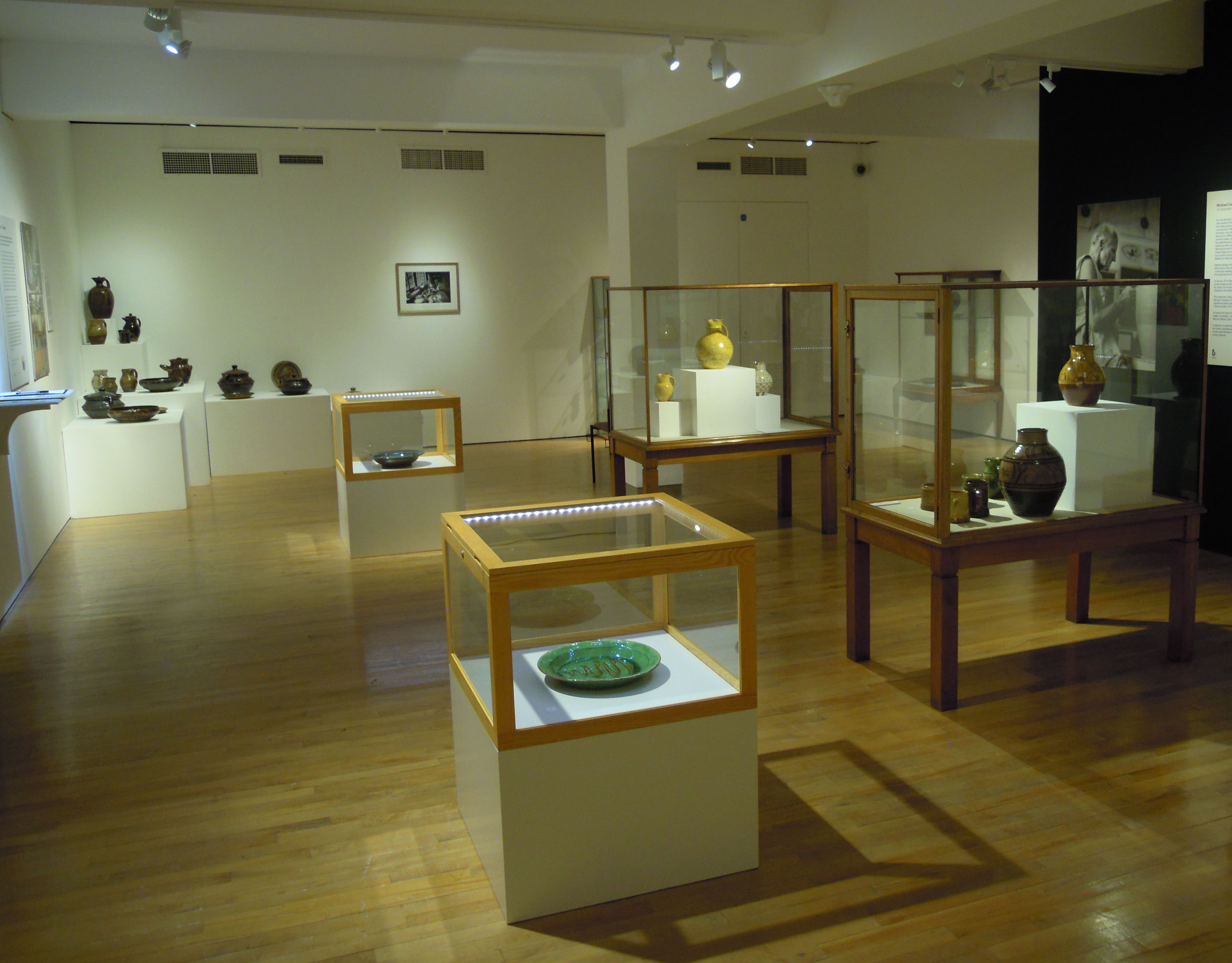
The Burton Ceramics Gallery

The Burton at Bideford is an art gallery and museum on Kingsley Road in Victoria Park, in Bideford, Devon, England. It houses collections on various topics connected with Bideford's history and cultural heritage. The art gallery displays work by local, national and international artists.

== History ==
The Burton first opened in 1951 to a design by architect Frank Whiting when Hubert Coop RBA (1872–1953) and Alderman Thomas Burton (1875–1959), a former Mayor of Bideford and a local businessman, gifted The Burton to the town to provide "a gallery for the enjoyment, education and good of all, old and young, inhabitants and visitors, everyone and as far as one can tell, of lasting credit to the living and those to come." This was done by the two in memory of Burton's daughter Mary (1904–1949), a talented artist who died of cancer.

== Collections ==
Since 1951 additions to the collections have included the works of such local artists as Bertram Prance (1889-1958), Judith Ackland (1898–1971) and Mary Stella Edwards (1893–1984), and the 535 piece ceramics collection put together by the artist R.J. Lloyd. Various of these were purchased with the assistance of the Art Fund.

There are also collections from the former Bideford Museum representing the history of Bideford; these permanent displays include the Bideford Witches, Sir Richard Grenville; Edward Capern the postman poet; and Raleigh, the first Native American to set foot in England. Artefacts include a large scale model made by Frank Whiting in 1945 of Bideford's ancient Long Bridge in all its stages from 1280 to 1925.

The Burton also houses Coop's collection of watercolours, oil paintings and Napoleonic ship models.

The Burton at Bideford presents its own local collection as well as important national and international works which ordinarily would not be accessible to the public in the South West. In 2017 a major exhibition featured Quentin Blake's original designs and illustrations for The BFG, while in Autumn 2018 the centre held an exhibition of the works of Beatrix Potter which included original illustrations, letters, games and artifacts, etc. Also included were Eleanor Taylor's illustrations to The Further Tale of Peter Rabbit by Emma Thompson.

== Facilities ==
The Burton at Bideford was reopened in May 1994 following a major programme of refurbishment which included the building of a large extension. Today the centre has three exhibition spaces which include a permanent gallery displaying North Devon Pottery which opened in 2010, a museum, craft gallery, shop, workshop and lecture area, tourist information desk and a French-style café, The Café du Parc.
