= Peppercombe =

Valley in north Devon, England

Coordinates: 50°59′35″N 4°18′32″W

Location of Peppercombe in Devon

Peppercombe is a small valley (combe) on the north-western coast of Devon, England. It is situated on the South West Coast Path between Westward Ho! to the north and Bucks Mills to the west. There is also a path descending from Horns Cross on the A39 road. The small stream of Peppercombe Water is a around 1/2 mile (0.80 km) long, but its valley is relatively deep. It ends in a waterfall consisting in a series of cascades, each between 0.5 and 1.5 metres (1.6 and 4.9 ft) high, that have formed due to the unequal hardness of the different beds of the underlying rock. The seaward section of Peppercombe is at the eastern end of the Hobby to Peppercombe biological Site of Special Scientific Interest (SSSI), while the coast section to north-east is part of the Mermaid's Pool to Rowden Gut geological SSSI.

== Geology ==
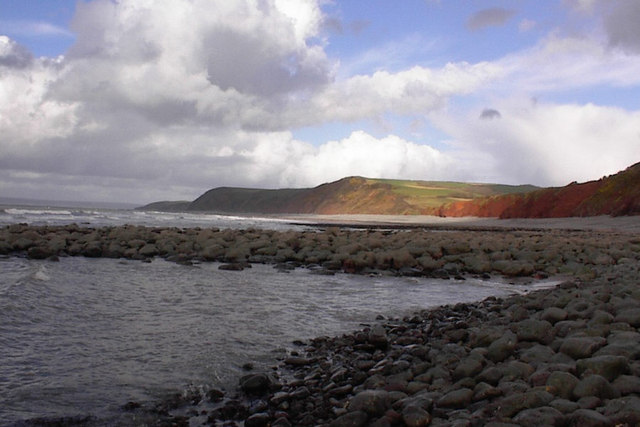
Peppercombe beach looking east to Portledge

A noticeable feature of the sea cliffs between Peppercombe and Portledge to the north is their distinctive red colour. Whereas the rocks of the surrounding areas form part of the Bude Formation of the Upper Carboniferous, those in the Peppercombe are an outlier of a later, presumably Permian age. These rocks extend for about 1 mile (2 km) inland, and consist of breccias with scattered calcareous bands and nodules, with occasional beds of sand and sandstone. This outlier is thought to be a remnant of the New Red Sandstone that formerly covered a much larger part of Devon, having been eroded away in geological times. This has a much more extensive outcrop in south-eastern Devon. It is thought that these rocks are derived from sediment deposited by rainstorm floods in an otherwise dry desert area situated on the fringes of a rugged highland.

== Peppercombe Castle ==
Peppercombe Castle is an Iron Age Hill fort situated on the cliffs immediately to the west of the valley. The remains of the fort are hard to define from maps and it may well be that much of the site has been lost to coastal erosion, but it would seem to have been at around 80 metres (260 ft) above sea level.

== Bibliography ==
- Arber, E. A. Newell (1911). The coast scenery of North Devon: being an account of the geological features of the coast-line extending from Porlock in Somerset to Boscastle in North Cornwall (1969 facsimile ed.). Bath: Kingsmead Reprints.
- Edmonds, E. A.; Williams, B. J.; Taylor, R. T. (1979). Geology of Bideford and Lundy Island: memoir for 1:50000 geological sheet 292, new series, with sheets 275, 276, 291 and part of sheet 308. London: Institute of Geological Sciences. ISBN 978-0-11-884120-7.
- Laming, D.J.C. (1982). "The New Red Sandstone". In Durrance, E.M.; Laming, D.J.C. (eds.). The geology of Devon. Exeter University. pp. 148–78. ISBN 978-0-85989-247-6.
- Pengelly, William (1866). "The Triassic Outliers of Devonshire". Transactions of the Devonshire Association for the Advancement of Science, Literature and Art. 1 (5): 49–59.
- Sellman, R.R. (1985). Aspects of Devon History. Devon Books. ISBN 0-86114-756-1.
