= Bucks Mills =

Village in Devon, England

Coordinates: 50.9863°N 4.3418°W

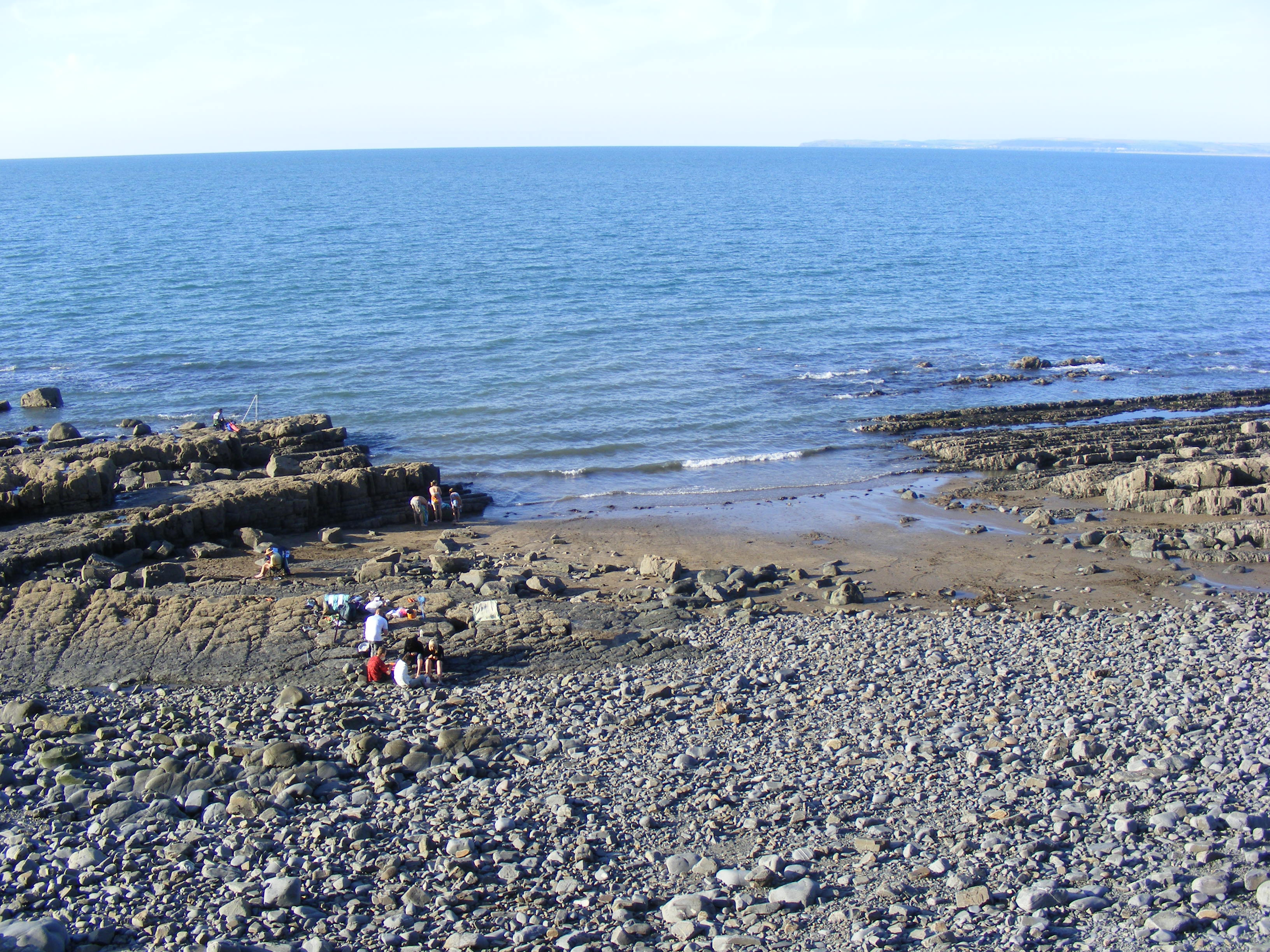
- The "Gut" blasted from the rocks on Bucks Mills beach.

- Location within Devon
- OS grid reference: SS357233
- Civil parish: Woolfardisworthy
- District: Torridge
- Shire county: Devon
- Region: South West
- Country: England
- Sovereign state: United Kingdom
- Postcode district: EX35
- Police: Devon and Cornwall
- Fire: Devon and Somerset
- Ambulance: South Western
- UK Parliament: Torridge and West Devon

Bucks Mills is a small English village within the parish of Woolfardisworthy on the north coast of Devon. It was anciently the mill of the manor of Bucks, anciently Bokish, Buckish, Bochewis etc., listed in the Domesday Book of 1086 as Bochewis. The village is within the North Devon Coast Area of Outstanding Natural Beauty and on the South West Coast Path.

Next to the village is Bucks Woods which includes the site of the Iron Age hill fort at Peppercombe Castle.

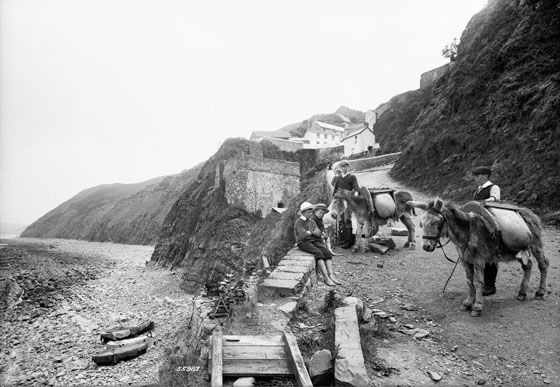
Pack donkeys at Buck Mills, 1906

The stream which runs through the village powered at least one mill. It falls over the cliff edge in a waterfall onto the beach which has large pebbles and hard sandstone formations. In the Elizabethan era a break in the rocks, known as the Gut, was created by Richard Cole (1568-1614), lord of the manor of Bucks, by blasting the rock with gunpowder to allow access to the small harbour built by him, which has since disappeared, creating a small harbour for fishing vessels. In the 18th century this was used for the import of culm, a mixture of anthracite and limestone which was burnt in kilns to produce fertiliser. The remains of two of the lime kilns can be seen on either side of the beach access.

In the 18th and 19th centuries many of the residents of Bucks Mills and the surrounding villages were related to the Braund family and King Cottage within Bucks Mills was once the home of Captain James Braund who was informally known as the "King of Bucks".

St Anne's Church was built in 1862. The church was endowed by a Mrs Elwes, the Lord of the manor of Walland Cary, the estate on which the village stood.

At Bucks Mill Cabin resided artist Mary Stella Edwards and Judith Ackland.

Hosted many child evacuees from London during World War 2, including actress Prunella Scales (as featured in the "Bristol & the West Country" episode of "Great Canal Journeys" tv series)

== Manor of Bucks ==
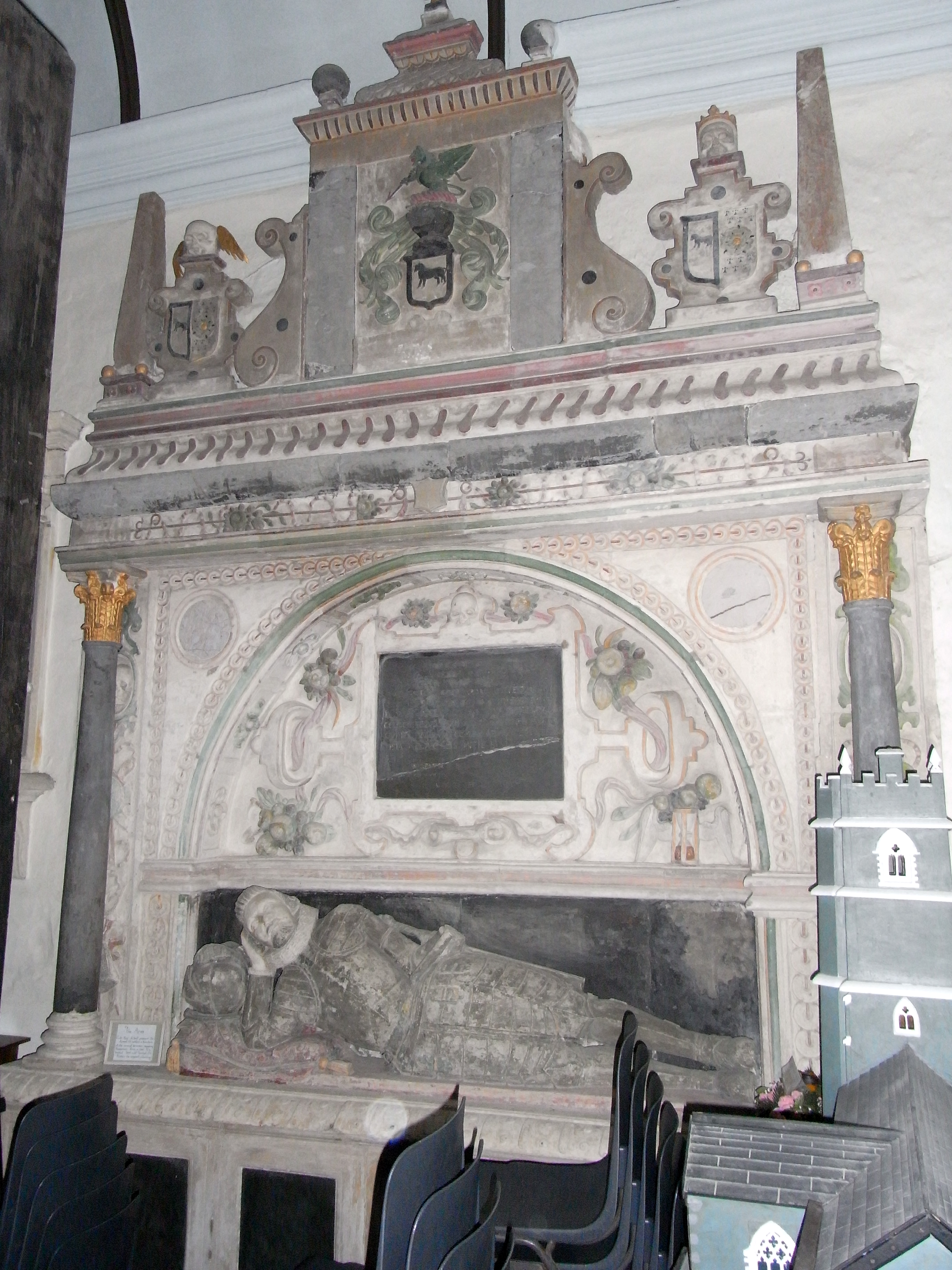
Monument to Richard Cole (1568-1614) of Bucks, All Hallows Church, Woolfardisworthy

The Domesday Book of 1086 lists Bochewis as the 2nd of the 27 Devonshire holdings of Theobald FitzBerner (fl.1086), one of the Devon Domesday Book tenants-in-chief of King William the Conqueror. He held it in-demesne. Before the Norman Conquest of 1066 it had been held jointly by three Anglo-Saxon thanes. The ancient manor is today represented by Bucks Mills and Bucks Cross. During the reign of King Edward I (1272-1307) the manor of Bucks, together with Wallen (later Wallen Cary, held by the Cary family, lords of the nearby Manor of Clovelly), was held by Henry de Wallen. During the reign of King Edward II (1307-1327) Stephen de Wallen granted to Robert Stockey and his heirs that their tenement of Potesford and Bulkworthy should have a right-of-way for ever upon his land of Bokish and Wallen, for the purposes of carrying "sea-oar" (some type of mineral ore) and sand from the sea "with all carriages whatsoever", which deed was witnessed by Matthew Crawthorne, Joel Pollard, Gilbert Wibbery and Walter Beaple. The manor was later acquired by means unknown by the Cole family of Slade in the parish of Cornworthy in Devon, a branch of Cole of Nethway in the parish of Brixham in Devon, one of whom was John Cole (born c.1376), twice a Member of Parliament for Devon, in 1417 and 1423 and Sheriff of Devon 1405–6. The last of the Coles of Bucks was Richard Cole (1568-1614), also of Slade, who died without progeny and whose large and elaborate monument with effigy dressed in armour survives in All Hallows Church, Woolsfardisworthy. His near contemporary the Devonshire historian Risdon (d.1640) (whose grandfather lived nearby at Bableigh, Parkham) stated of him: "Richard Cole, the last of that family that dwelt at Bokish, erected a harbour in his land, there to shelter ships and boats". This is now known as the Old Quay at Bucks Mills, This structure was built after he had blasted out the rock with gunpowder to leave a sandy inlet known as "The Gut" or "Gutway". Remains of the quay are visible at low-tide.
