= List of churches in North Devon =

The following is a list of churches in North Devon.

== Active churches ==
The only civil parishes without churches are Pilton West and Queen's Nympton. The district has an estimated 130 churches for 94,600 people, a ratio of one church to every 728 inhabitants.

Name	Civil parish	Web	Dedication	Founded	Denomination	Benefice	Notes
St James, Arlington	Arlington		James		Church of England	Shirwell MC	
St Peter, Ashford	Ashford		Peter		Church of England	Barnstaple	
St Mary, Atherington	Atherington		Mary		Church of England	Two Rivers MC	
SS Peter & Mary Magdalene, Barnstaple	Barnstaple		Peter & Mary Magd	Medieval	Church of England	Barnstaple	
St Mary the Virgin, Pilton	Barnstaple (Pilton)		Mary	Medieval	Church of England	Barnstaple	
St John the Baptist, Newport	Barnstaple		John the Baptist	1829	Church of England	Barnstaple	
Holy Trinity, Barnstaple	Barnstaple		Trinity	1868	Church of England	Barnstaple	
St Paul, Sticklepath	Barnstaple		Paul	1956	Church of England	Barnstaple	
St Mary, Immaculate Mother of God	Barnstaple		Mary		Roman Catholic	Immaculate Conception Parish	
Barnstaple Baptist Church	Barnstaple			1817	Baptist Union		Current building 1861
Newport Methodist Church	Barnstaple				Methodist	Ilfracombe & Barnstaple Circuit	
Christ Church Barnstaple	Barnstaple		Jesus	C17th	Methodist / URC	Ilfracombe & Barnstaple Circuit	Methodist and URC churches united 1988
Barnstaple Salvation Army	Barnstaple				Salvation Army		
Barnstaple Quaker Meeting	Barnstaple				Quakers		Meets in Pilton Bluecoat Academy
North Devon Christian Fellowship	Barnstaple				Ground Level		Meets in Orchard Vale School
Grosvenor Church Barnstaple	Barnstaple			1842	Independent		
Whiddon Valley Evangelical Church	Barnstaple			1890	Independent		Formerly Rackfield Evangelical Mission
Freedom Church	Barnstaple			1994	Independent		
St Peter, Berrynarbor	Berrynarbor		Peter		Church of England	Berrynarbor & Combe Martin?	
St Mary's church	Bideford		Saint Mary	1865	Church of England		
St Mary the Virgin, Bishop's Nympton	Bishop's Nympton		Mary		Church of England	North Molton etc.	
Bishops Nympton Methodist Church	Bishop's Nympton				Methodist	S Molton & Ringsash Circuit	
St John the Baptist, Bishop's Tawton	Bishop's Tawton		John the Baptist	Medieval	Church of England	Barnstaple	
Herner Chapel	Bishop's Tawton (Herner)				Church of England	Barnstaple	
Bishop's Tawton Methodist Church	Bishop's Tawton				Methodist	Ilfracombe & Barnstaple Circuit	
St Peter, Bittadon	Bittadon		Peter		Church of England	Ilfracombe & Bittadon	
St Peter, Bratton Fleming	Bratton Fleming		Peter		CoE / Methodist	Shirwell MC	CoE and Methodist churches joined 2004
Bratton Fleming Baptist Church	Bratton Fleming				Baptist Union		
St Brannock, Braunton	Braunton		Brannoc of Braunton	Medieval	Church of England	Braunton & Saunton	
St Anne, Saunton	Braunton (Saunton)		Anne	C17th or e.	Church of England	Braunton & Saunton	Rebuilt 1895-1896
St Brannoc's Catholic Church, Braunton	Braunton		Brannoc of Braunton		Roman Catholic	Holy Cross Parish	
Christ Church, Braunton	Braunton		Jesus		Methodist / URC	Ilfracombe & Barnstaple Circuit	
South St Evangelical Church, Braunton	Braunton				Partnership UK		
All Saints, High Bray	Brayford		All Saints		Church of England	North Molton etc.	
St John the Baptist, Charles	Brayford (Charles)		John the Baptist		Church of England	North Molton etc.	
Brayford Methodist Church	Brayford				Methodist	S Molton & Ringsash Circuit	
St Brendan, Brendon	Brendon & Countisbury		Brendan		Church of England	Lyn Valley MC	
St John the Evangelist, Countisbury	Brendon & Countisbury		John the Evangelist		Church of England	Lyn Valley MC	
St Mary and St Benedict	Buckland Brewer		Saint Mary and Saint Benedict	Medieval	Church of England	Deanery of Hartland	
Holy Trinity, Burrington	Burrington		Trinity	Medieval	Church of England	Little Dart MC	
Bethesda Methodist Chapel, Burrington	Burrington		Pool of Bethesda		Methodist	S Molton & Ringsash Circuit	
Holy Trinity, Challacombe	Challacombe		Trinity	Medieval	Church of England	Shirwell MC	
Challacombe Methodist Church	Challacombe				Methodist	Ilfracombe & Barnstaple Circuit	
St John the Baptist, Chittlehamholt	Chittlehamholt		John the Baptist	1838	Church of England	South Molton MC	
St Hieritha, Chittlehampton	Chittlehampton		Urith	Medieval	Church of England	South Molton MC	
Good Shepherd, Umberleigh	Chittlehampton (Umberleigh)		Jesus		Church of England	South Molton MC	Monthly services only
Umberleigh Christian Fellowship	Chittlehampton (Umberleigh)				Independent		
Chittlehampton Methodist Church	Chittlehampton				Methodist	S Molton & Ringsash Circuit	
St Mary Magdalene, Chulmleigh	Chulmleigh		Mary Magdalene	Medieval	Church of England	Little Dart MC	CoE and Methodist churches hold joint 'Beacon' services
St Mary, Cheldon	Chulmleigh (Cheldon)		Mary		Church of England	Little Dart MC	
Chulmleigh Methodist Church	Chulmleigh				Methodist	S Molton & Ringsash Circuit	Building closed 2009, now meets in Congregational chapel
Chulmleigh Congregational Church	Chulmleigh			1662	Cong Fed		
St Peter ad Vincula, Combe Martin	Combe Martin		Peter		Church of England	Philip, James, Combe Martin?	
Combe Martin Baptist Church	Combe Martin				Baptist Union		
Combe Martin Methodist Church	Combe Martin			1830	Methodist	Ilfracombe & Barnstaple Circuit	Current building 1883
St Peter, West Buckland	East & West Buckland		Peter		Church of England	Fourways MC	
St Michael, East Buckland	East & West Buckland		Michael		Church of England	Fourways MC	
St Michael, East Anstey	East Anstey		Michael		Church of England	North Molton etc.	
St John the Baptist, East Down	East Down		John the Baptist	Medieval	Church of England	Shirwell MC	
St Mary, East Worlington	East Worlington		Mary		Church of England	Little Dart MC	
St Mary, West Worlington	East Worlington (W Worlington)		Mary	Medieval	Church of England	Little Dart MC	
St Paul, Filleigh	Filleigh		Paul	Medieval	CoE / Methodist	South Molton MC	Rebuilt 1732. CoE & Methodist churches joined 1974
Church of St Peter, Fremington	Fremington		Peter	Medieval	Church of England	Fremington, Instow, Westleigh	
Fremington Methodist Church	Fremington				Methodist	Ilfracombe & Barnstaple Circuit	
Coastal Community Church	Fremington (Sticklepath)				Assemblies of God		
St George, George Nympton	George Nympton		George		Church of England	South Molton MC	
St George, Georgeham	Georgeham		George		Church of England	Georgeham & Croyde	
St Mary Magdalene, Croyde	Georgeham (Croyde)		Mary Magdalene		Church of England	Georgeham & Croyde	
Croyde Baptist Church	Georgeham (Croyde)				Baptist Union		
St Gregory, Goodleigh	Goodleigh		Pope Gregory I		Church of England	Barnstaple	
Goodleigh Methodist Church	Goodleigh				Methodist	Ilfracombe & Barnstaple Circuit	
St Augustine, Heanton Punchardon	Heanton Punchardon		Augustine?	Medieval	Church of England	Villages MC	
St Michael, Horwood	Horwood, Lovacott & Newton Tracey		Michael		Church of England	Two Rivers MC	
St Thomas-a-Beckett, Newton Tracey	Horwood, Lovacott & Newton Tracey		Thomas Becket		Church of England	Two Rivers MC	
Holy Trinity Church, Ilfracombe	Ilfracombe		Trinity	Medieval	Church of England	Ilfracombe & Bittadon	
SS Philip & James, Ilfracombe	Ilfracombe		Philip & James the L	1857	Church of England	Philip, James, Combe Martin?	
St Peter, Ilfracombe	Ilfracombe		Peter	1903	Church of England	Ilfracombe & Bittadon	
SS Matthew & Wardrede, Lee	Ilfracombe (Lee)		Matthew & Wardrede	Medieval	Church of England	Coastal Parishes	Rebuilt 1835
Our Lady Star of the Sea, Ilfracombe	Ilfracombe		Mary		Roman Catholic	Holy Cross Parish	
Ilfracombe Baptist Church	Ilfracombe			1852	Baptist Union		Current building 1891
Emmanuel, Ilfracombe	Ilfracombe		Jesus	C18th	Methodist / URC	Ilfracombe & Barnstaple Circuit	Methodist & URC churches united 1989
Brookdale Evangelical Church	Ilfracombe				FIEC		
Encounter Church, Ilfracombe	Ilfracombe				Independent		Previously Ilfracombe Christian Fellowship
St John the Baptist, Instow	Instow		John the Baptist	Medieval	Church of England	Fremington, Instow, Westleigh	
All Saints Chapel, Instow	Instow		All Saints	1936	Church of England	Fremington, Instow, Westleigh	Monthly services only
St Thomas, Kentisbury	Kentisbury		Thomas		Church of England	Shirwell MC	
St James the Apostle, Kingsnympton	King's Nympton		James		Church of England	South Molton MC	
Kings Nympton Methodist Church	King's Nympton				Methodist	S Molton & Ringsash Circuit	
St Peter, Knowstone	Knowstone		Peter		Church of England	North Molton etc.	
St Paul, Landkey	Landkey		Paul	Medieval	Church of England	Fourways MC	
St Michael & All Angels, Loxhore	Loxhore		Michael & Angels	Medieval	Church of England	Shirwell MC	
Lower Loxhore Methodist Church	Loxhore				Methodist	Ilfracombe & Barnstaple Circuit	
St Mary the Virgin, Lynton	Lynton & Lynmouth		Mary	Medieval	Church of England	Lyn Valley MC	
St John the Baptist, Lynmouth	Lynton & Lynmouth		John the Baptist		Church of England	Lyn Valley MC	
St Bartholomew, Barbrook	Lynton & Lynmouth (Barbrook)		Bartholomew	1875	Church of England	Lyn Valley MC	
Most Holy Saviour, Lynton	Lynton & Lynmouth		Jesus		Roman Catholic	Holy Cross Parish	
Lynton URC	Lynton & Lynmouth				URC		
St Mary, Mariansleigh	Mariansleigh		Mary		Church of England	North Molton etc.	
St Martin, Martinhoe	Martinhoe		Martin of Tours		Church of England	Lyn Valley MC	
St Michael & All Angels, Marwood	Marwood		Michael & Angels	Medieval	Church of England	Villages MC	
Marwood Methodist Church	Marwood				Methodist	Ilfracombe & Barnstaple Circuit	
Muddiford URC	Marwood (Muddiford)				URC		
St John, Meshaw	Meshaw		John the Baptist	Medieval	Church of England	Little Dart MC	
St Mary, Molland	Molland		Mary		Church of England	North Molton etc.	
St Mary Magdalene, Mortehoe	Mortehoe		Mary Magdalene	Medieval	Church of England	Coastal Parishes	
St Sabinus, Woolacombe	Mortehoe (Woolacombe)		Sabinus of Spoleto	1912	Church of England	Coastal Parishes	
St Margaret of Antioch	Northam		Saint Margaret	Medieval	Church of England		Torridge Coastal Mission Community
All Saints, North Molton	North Molton		All Saints		Church of England	North Molton etc.	
North Molton Methodist Church	North Molton				Methodist	S Molton & Ringsash Circuit	
Christ Church, Parracombe	Parracombe		Jesus	1879	Church of England	Lyn Valley Churches	Replaced St Petroc's (see below)
All Saints, Rackenford	Rackenford		All Saints	Medieval	Church of England	Exe Valley MC	
St Rumon, Romansleigh	Romansleigh		Rumon	Medieval	Church of England	Little Dart MC	Rebuilt 1868
St Peter, Rose Ash	Rose Ash		Peter		Church of England	North Molton etc.	
St John the Evangelist, Warkleigh	Satterleigh & Warkleigh		John the Evangelist	Medieval	Church of England	South Molton MC	
St Peter, Shirwell	Shirwell		Peter	Medieval	Church of England	Shirwell MC	
St Mary Magdalene, South Molton	South Molton		Mary Magdalene	Medieval	Church of England	South Molton MC	
St Joseph, South Molton	South Molton		Joseph		Roman Catholic	Immaculate Conception Parish	
South Molton Baptist Church	South Molton				Baptist Union		
South Molton Methodist Church	South Molton				Methodist	S Molton & Ringsash Circuit	
South Molton Gospel Hall	South Molton				Gospel Hall		
St Bartholomew, Stoke Rivers	Stoke Rivers		Bartholomew	Medieval	Church of England	Shirwell MC	
St James, Swimbridge	Swimbridge		James	Medieval	Church of England	Fourways MC	
Holy Name, Gunn	Swimbridge (Gunn)				Church of England	Fourways MC	
St Peter, Tawstock	Tawstock		Peter		Church of England	Two Rivers MC	
Roundswell Church	Tawstock (Roundswell)				Baptist Union		
Sticklepath Methodist Church	Tawstock (Roundswell)				Methodist	Ilfracombe & Barnstaple Circuit	
St Peter, Trentishoe	Trentishoe		Peter		Church of England		
St Peter, Twitchen	Twitchen		Peter		Church of England	North Molton etc.	
St Petrock, West Anstey	West Anstey		Petroc		Church of England	North Molton etc.	
St Calixtus, West Down	West Down		Pope Callixtus I	Medieval	Church of England	Villages MC	Unusual dedication
St Peter, Westleigh	Westleigh		Peter	Medieval	Church of England	Fremington, Instow, Westleigh	
St John the Baptist, Witheridge	Witheridge		John the Baptist	Medieval	Church of England	Little Dart MC	Also serves Creacombe
Witheridge Methodist Church	Witheridge				Methodist	Ringsash Circuit	

== Defunct churches ==
Name	Civil parish	Dedication	Ref	Founded	Redundant	Denomination	Notes
Immaculate Conception, Barnstaple	Barnstaple	Immaculate Conception		1855		Roman Catholic	
St Petrock, Parracombe	Parracombe	Petroc		Medieval	1969	Church of England	Churches Conservation Trust 1971
St Peter, Satterleigh	Satterleigh & Warkleigh	Peter		Medieval		Church of England	Churches Conservation Trust 1996
