= Grade II* listed buildings in North Devon =

There are over 20,000 Grade II* listed buildings in England. This page is a list of these buildings in the district of North Devon in Devon.

== North Devon ==
Name	Location	Type	Completed (Note: The date given is the date used by Historic England as significant for the initial building or that of an important part in the structure's description.)	Date designated	Grid ref. (Note: The grid reference is based on the British national grid reference system, sometimes known as OSGB36, used by the Ordnance Survey.) Geo-coordinates	Entry number (Note: The "List Entry Number" is a unique number assigned to each listed building and scheduled monument by Historic England.)	Image
Arlington Court	Arlington	Country House	1820	25 February 1965	SS6109440522; 51°08′49″N 3°59′14″W	1106817	Arlington Court More images
Church of St James	Arlington	Church	Late 15th century or early 16th century	25 February 1965	SS6129540480; 51°08′48″N 3°59′04″W	1106820	Church of St James More images
Glebe House	Arlington	Country House	1824	25 February 1965	SS6132640542; 51°08′50″N 3°59′02″W	1106823	Glebe House
Church of St Peter	Ashford	Parish Church	Medieval	25 February 1965	SS5335035357; 51°05′55″N 4°05′45″W	1107140	Church of St Peter More images
Lemons Farmhouse	Atherington	Farmhouse	Late 15th century	25 February 1965	SS5920923082; 50°59′24″N 4°00′27″W	1106856	Upload Photo
Church of Holy Trinity and attached Railings and Gate	Barnstaple	Gate	1843-1845	22 June 1981	SS5620632778; 51°04′35″N 4°03′14″W	1384982	Church of Holy Trinity and attached Railings and Gate More images
Church of Saints Peter and Paul & Church of St Peter including the Doddridge Library	Barnstaple	Churches	1667	19 January 1951	SS5583333223; 51°04′49″N 4°03′34″W	1385251	Church of Saints Peter and Paul & Church of St Peter including the Doddridge Library More images
Horwoods Almshouses	Barnstaple	Almshouses	1674	19 January 1951	SS5587233171; 51°04′47″N 4°03′32″W	1385102	Horwoods Almshouses More images
North Country Inn	Barnstaple	Courtyard House	17th century	31 December 1973	SS5572033508; 51°04′58″N 4°03′40″W	1385068	Upload Photo
Old School Coffee House (formerly Horwoods School)	Barnstaple	Restaurant	1999	19 January 1951	SS5586233151; 51°04′46″N 4°03′33″W	1385105	Old School Coffee House (formerly Horwoods School) More images
Paiges Almshouses	Barnstaple	Almshouses	1656	19 January 1951	SS5586133181; 51°04′47″N 4°03′33″W	1385106	Paiges Almshouses More images
Pill House	Bishop's Tawton/Rumsam, Barnstaple	Apartment	1951	19 January 1951	SS5629331617; 51°03′57″N 4°03′08″W	1385256	Pill House More images
The Guildhall	Barnstaple	Guildhall	1826	19 January 1951	SS5579133247; 51°04′49″N 4°03′36″W	1385188	The Guildhall More images
Three Tuns Inn	Barnstaple	Jettied House	Renovated 1946	19 January 1951	SS5576933243; 51°04′49″N 4°03′38″W	1385165	Upload Photo
8 Cross Street	Barnstaple	House	c. 1635	19 January 1951	SS5573333177; 51°04′47″N 4°03′39″W	1385114	Upload Photo
39 High Street	Barnstaple	House	Wing extended 19th century	31 December 1973	SS5575933343; 51°04′52″N 4°03′38″W	1385154	Upload Photo
36 Pilton Street	Pilton, Barnstaple	House	Refurbished early 18th century	19 January 1951	SS5567334060; 51°05′16″N 4°03′44″W	1385277	Upload Photo
Church of St Peter	Berrynarbor	Church	1767	25 February 1965	SS5604346709; 51°12′05″N 4°03′43″W	1306896	Church of St Peter More images
Watermouth Castle, including Front Retaining Wall and Rear Courtyard Walls	Berrynarbor	Country House	1825-26	9 March 1953	SS5557648041; 51°12′48″N 4°04′09″W	1168686	Watermouth Castle, including Front Retaining Wall and Rear Courtyard Walls More images
Cross Farmhouse	Bishop's Nympton	Farmhouse	Late medieval origins	20 February 1967	SS7460623635; 50°59′54″N 3°47′18″W	1107288	Upload Photo
Barn and Horse Engine House approximately 5 Metres East of Wellesley Farmhouse	Bishop's Tawton	Cruck House	19th century	18 March 1986	SS5998926745; 51°01′23″N 3°59′52″W	1164044	Upload Photo
Great Halmpstone	Bishop's Tawton	Farmhouse	15th century	18 March 1986	SS5943228354; 51°02′14″N 4°00′23″W	1107722	Upload Photo
Hall House	Hall, Bishop's Tawton	Country House	1846-1850	26 February 1965	SS5855727168; 51°01′35″N 4°01′06″W	1107730	Hall House More images
Orangery approximately 50 Metres South West of Hall House	Hall, Bishop's Tawton	Orangery	18th century	25 February 1965	SS5842827116; 51°01′33″N 4°01′12″W	1366225	Upload Photo
Rosehill	Bishop's Tawton	House	c. 1835	18 March 1986	SS5709631439; 51°03′52″N 4°02′27″W	1107696	Upload Photo
Ash Barton Estate	Braunton	Estate	17th century	25 February 1965	SS5112537326; 51°06′57″N 4°07′42″W	1107105	Ash Barton Estate More images
Broadgate	Braunton	House	C20	9 March 1953	SS4891636866; 51°06′40″N 4°09′35″W	1107084	Upload Photo
Buckland Manor	Braunton	Manor House	Early 17th century	25 February 1965	SS4837837743; 51°07′08″N 4°10′04″W	1107112	Buckland Manor More images
Church House	Braunton	Church House	16th century	25 February 1965	SS4894637052; 51°06′46″N 4°09′34″W	1161569	Upload Photo
Fairlinch	Braunton	Farmhouse	1629	25 February 1965	SS4751237563; 51°07′01″N 4°10′48″W	1325553	Upload Photo
Saunton Court including Garden Structures to East Incorporating Gateway, Garden Walls and Gatepiers, Gazebo, Grotto and Flight of Steps	Braunton	Manor House	15th century	25 February 1965	SS4568737908; 51°07′11″N 4°12′22″W	1107095	Upload Photo
Threshing Barn and Horse Engine House 5 Metres North-north-west of Buckland Manor House	Braunton	Horse Engine House	1712	14 November 1985	SS4835737771; 51°07′09″N 4°10′05″W	1107113	Upload Photo
Town Farm, Including Wall Adjoining South-east and Railings Adjoining East	Braunton	Farmhouse	C15-Early 16th century	14 November 1985	SS4852536657; 51°06′33″N 4°09′55″W	1309959	Upload Photo
Church of Holy Trinity	Barton Town, Challacombe	Parish Church	Early 16th century	25 February 1965	SS6799040621; 51°08′58″N 3°53′20″W	1325280	Church of Holy Trinity More images
Barnstaple House & Galleon Cottage & Plantaganet Cottage	Chittlehampton	House	Late C17/early 18th century	8 January 1988	SS6355525462; 51°00′44″N 3°56′47″W	1258379	Upload Photo
Coachman's House and Clock Tower Approximately 20 Metres East of Hudscott House	Chittlehampton	Coachmans Cottage	1711	20 February 1967	SS6500824784; 51°00′24″N 3°55′32″W	1079499	Coachman's House and Clock Tower Approximately 20 Metres East of Hudscott House More images
Hawkridge Barton	Chittlehampton	Farmhouse	Probably late 15th century	9 June 1952	SS6115625588; 51°00′46″N 3°58′50″W	1079496	Hawkridge Barton More images
Hudscott House	Chittlehampton	House	Earlier	20 February 1967	SS6495424764; 51°00′23″N 3°55′34″W	1258127	Hudscott House More images
Stone Retaining Walls Forming Moat Circa 5-10 Metres West of Brightly Barton	Chittlehampton	House	Moved 17th century	8 January 1988	SS6124922700; 50°59′13″N 3°58′42″W	1079490	Upload Photo
Brooklands Farmhouse	Chulmleigh	Farmhouse	MID-LATE 17th century	25 October 1988	SS7060215443; 50°55′26″N 3°50′33″W	1325757	Upload Photo
Church of St. Mary	Cheldon, Chulmleigh	Parish Church	15th century	25 October 1988	SS7342513404; 50°54′22″N 3°48′06″W	1325761	Church of St. Mary More images
Coachhouse to South West of Gatehouse at Colleton Manor	Chulmleigh	Hayloft	Late 19th century	25 October 1988	SS6685214635; 50°54′57″N 3°53′44″W	1165960	Upload Photo
Congregational Chapel, including Front Walls and Iron Railings	Chulmleigh	School	1836	20 February 1967	SS6890814300; 50°54′48″N 3°51′58″W	1106706	Congregational Chapel, including Front Walls and Iron Railings More images
Stables to South of Colleton Manor	Chulmleigh	Tack Room	Late 19th century	25 October 1988	SS6687514612; 50°54′56″N 3°53′43″W	1106731	Upload Photo
The Pack of Cards Including Courtyard Walls Incorporating Bee Boles on North-west Side	Combe Martin	House	Reputedly built as such	9 March 1953	SS5833646722; 51°12′08″N 4°01′45″W	1169072	The Pack of Cards Including Courtyard Walls Incorporating Bee Boles on North-west Side More images
West Challacombe Manor	Combe Martin	Farmhouse	1953	9 March 1953	SS5864747567; 51°12′35″N 4°01′30″W	1306692	Upload Photo
Church of Saint John	Countisbury	Church	Probably earlier-Pre 18th century	25 February 1965	SS7471549769; 51°14′00″N 3°47′45″W	1289192	Church of Saint John More images
Church of St Peter	West Buckland, East and West Buckland	Parish Church	15th century	20 February 1967	SS6568731307; 51°03′55″N 3°55′06″W	1161310	Church of St Peter More images
South Stoodleigh Farmhouse Including Attached Outbuildings to Rear	East and West Buckland	Farmhouse	Possible 17th century core	20 February 1967	SS6571932314; 51°04′28″N 3°55′05″W	1107567	South Stoodleigh Farmhouse Including Attached Outbuildings to Rear More images
Bunksland Farmhouse and Attached Outbuildings	East Anstey	Farmhouse	Early 15th century	11 May 1983	SS8502426271; 51°01′27″N 3°38′27″W	1106670	Upload Photo
Church of St Michael	East Anstey	Parish Church	15th century	20 February 1967	SS8673026526; 51°01′37″N 3°37′00″W	1325768	Church of St Michael More images
Dunsley Farmhouse	East Anstey	Farmhouse	Early 16th century	15 September 1987	SS8529126505; 51°01′35″N 3°38′13″W	1106674	Dunsley Farmhouse
Church of St John the Baptist	East Down Village, East Down	Church	1709	25 February 1965	SS6012641803; 51°09′30″N 4°00′06″W	1163326	Church of St John the Baptist More images
East Down Manor	East Down Village, East Down	Manor House	Late 17th century	25 February 1965	SS6004941802; 51°09′30″N 4°00′10″W	1107152	East Down Manor More images
Affeton Castle	East Worlington	House	1868	9 June 1952	SS7553113697; 50°54′33″N 3°46′18″W	1325448	Affeton Castle More images
Cobley Farmhouse with Forecourt Wall and Gateway	East Worlington	Farmhouse	Early 17th century	20 February 1967	SS7519712054; 50°53′40″N 3°46′33″W	1107331	Upload Photo
East Worlington House	East Worlington	House	1965	20 February 1967	SS7748413667; 50°54′34″N 3°44′38″W	1107333	Upload Photo
Bremridge	Filleigh	House	Part now ruined	20 August 1951	SS6934529089; 51°02′47″N 3°51′55″W	1107533	Bremridge More images
Castle Hill House	Castle Hill, Filleigh	Country House	Late Tudor	20 February 1967	SS6711028455; 51°02′24″N 3°53′49″W	1107537	Castle Hill House More images
Stable Block approximately 5 Metres North East of Castle Hill House Including 2 Pairs of Gatepiers Flanking Its Western End	Castle Hill, Filleigh	Stables	1843	13 May 1987	SS6720728444; 51°02′24″N 3°53′44″W	1107538	Stable Block approximately 5 Metres North East of Castle Hill House Including 2 Pairs of Gatepiers Flanking Its Western End More images
Church of St Paul	Filleigh	Parish Church	1732	20 February 1967	SS6625628045; 51°02′10″N 3°54′32″W	1107543	Church of St Paul More images
Church of St Peter	Fremington	Parish Church	13th century	25 February 1965	SS5118932562; 51°04′23″N 4°07′32″W	1163217	Church of St Peter More images
Fremington Manor House including Entrance Gateway attached to West Side	Fremington	House	C20	6 July 1976	SS5123832554; 51°04′23″N 4°07′29″W	1325314	Fremington Manor House including Entrance Gateway attached to West Side More images
Gazebo on North Side of Fremington Manor Gardens	Fremington	Gazebo	1747	29 May 1986	SS5115832682; 51°04′27″N 4°07′34″W	1163261	Upload Photo
Church of St George	George Nympton	Parish Church	15th century	20 February 1967	SS7003322967; 50°59′29″N 3°51′12″W	1309366	Church of St George More images
Myrtle Farmhouse	Croyde, Georgeham	Farmhouse	17th century, possibly earlier	25 February 1965	SS4439539285; 51°07′54″N 4°13′31″W	1162257	Myrtle Farmhouse More images
Church of St Gregory	Goodleigh, Goodleigh	Church	Late 15th century	25 February 1965	SS5984434152; 51°05′22″N 4°00′10″W	1164580	Church of St Gregory More images
Rigg Side	Goodleigh	Timber Framed House	1970-1971	24 July 1998	SS6024034327; 51°05′28″N 3°59′49″W	1375758	Rigg Side More images
Church of St Thomas of Canterbury	Newton Tracey, Lovacott and Newton Tracey	Parish Church	13th century	25 February 1965	SS5293926879; 51°01′21″N 4°05′54″W	1253508	Church of St Thomas of Canterbury More images
Hoopers Cottage	Horwood, Lovacott and Newton Tracey	House	c. 1600	25 February 1965	SS5020327626; 51°01′42″N 4°08′15″W	1325320	Upload Photo
Barn Approximately 40 Metres North of Damage Barton	Damage Barton, Ilfracombe	Barn	1656	15 June 1951	SS4728545673; 51°11′23″N 4°11′12″W	1202938	Upload Photo
Beara Farmhouse	Hele, Ilfracombe	Farmhouse	15th century	17 May 1973	SS5388647064; 51°12′15″N 4°05′34″W	1207958	Upload Photo
Chambercombe Manor with Attached Yard Walls	Ilfracombe	Farmhouse	15th century	15 June 1951	SS5326746803; 51°12′06″N 4°06′06″W	1208154	Chambercombe Manor with Attached Yard Walls More images
Damage Barton	Damage Barton, Ilfracombe	Farmhouse	16th century or earlier	15 June 1951	SS4728345635; 51°11′22″N 4°11′12″W	1281939	Upload Photo
Parish Church of Saint Philip and St James	Ilfracombe	Church	1856	16 March 1992	SS5218847815; 51°12′37″N 4°07′03″W	1292875	Parish Church of Saint Philip and St James More images
The Quay from Royal Britannia Hotel on West to Pier Hotel on East Including Old Quay Head	Ilfracombe	Steps	1824-9	12 March 1990	SS5241447822; 51°12′38″N 4°06′51″W	1203010	Upload Photo
Church of St Thomas	Kentisbury	Church	Dated 1762	25 February 1965	SS6227543831; 51°10′37″N 3°58′18″W	1106810	Church of St Thomas More images
Broomham Farmhouse	King's Nympton	Farmhouse	1638	20 February 1967	SS7089321262; 50°58′35″N 3°50′25″W	1152877	Upload Photo
Capelcombe Farmhouse	King's Nympton	Farmhouse	Early 16th century	20 February 1967	SS6889822470; 50°59′12″N 3°52′09″W	1106690	Upload Photo
Laundry immediately North North West of Kings Nympton Park	Kings Nympton Park, King's Nympton	Wash House	Mid 18th century	9 June 1952	SS6726719571; 50°57′37″N 3°53′29″W	1325777	Upload Photo
Church of St Peter	Knowstone	Parish Church	15th century	20 February 1967	SS8279523076; 50°59′42″N 3°40′17″W	1106680	Church of St Peter More images
Shapcott Barton	Knowstone	Farmhouse	c. 1600	20 February 1967	SS8464223490; 50°59′57″N 3°38′43″W	1107317	Shapcott Barton
Harford Barton (includes adjoining Outbuildings to North)	Harford, Landkey	Farmhouse	Early 17th century	18 March 1986	SS6026831849; 51°04′08″N 3°59′45″W	1107685	Upload Photo
The Old Manor	Landkey Newland, Landkey	House	Late 15th century	25 February 1965	SS5905031186; 51°03′46″N 4°00′46″W	1325269	Upload Photo
Church of St Michael	Loxhore	Parish Church	C15/C16	25 February 1965	SS6168938757; 51°07′53″N 3°58′41″W	1107692	Church of St Michael More images
Hill House and adjoining Shippon and detached Kitchen 5 Metres to South	Loxhore	Kitchen	17th century	25 February 1965	SS6216937842; 51°07′24″N 3°58′15″W	1165051	Upload Photo
Church of St Mary the Virgin	Lynton, Lynton and Lynmouth	Anglican Church	1741	19 July 1950	SS7206249436; 51°13′47″N 3°50′01″W	1282837	Church of St Mary the Virgin More images
Methodist Church	Lynton, Lynton and Lynmouth	Craft centre	1910	9 June 1995	SS7184249507; 51°13′49″N 3°50′13″W	1201144	Methodist Church More images
Town Hall	Lynton, Lynton and Lynmouth	Town Hall	1898	3 September 1973	SS7188049514; 51°13′49″N 3°50′11″W	1206608	Town Hall More images
Church of St Mary	Mariansleigh	Bell Tower	13th century or earlier	20 February 1967	SS7440122050; 50°59′03″N 3°47′27″W	1107243	Church of St Mary More images
Yeo Farmhouse	Mariansleigh	Farmhouse	Late medieval	20 February 1967	SS7603123039; 50°59′36″N 3°46′04″W	1163171	Upload Photo
Church of St Martin	Martinhoe	Parish Church	Late C13/early 14th century	25 February 1965	SS6680248659; 51°13′18″N 3°54′31″W	1106778	Church of St Martin More images
Barn and Cow House 50 Metres East of Westcott Barton	Westcott, Marwood	Barn	Early 17th century	25 February 1965	SS5320438514; 51°07′37″N 4°05′57″W	1107162	Upload Photo
Meshaw Barton and Walled Forecourt	Meshaw	Farmhouse	Early 16th century	20 February 1967	SS7644119265; 50°57′34″N 3°45′39″W	1305732	Upload Photo
Great Champson Farmhouse	Champson, Molland	Farmhouse	Early to Mid 16th century	20 February 1967	SS8023228402; 51°02′33″N 3°42′35″W	1213706	Upload Photo
West Molland Barton	West Molland Barton, Molland	Farmhouse	Probably earlier-Pre 18th century	9 June 1952	SS7932428478; 51°02′35″N 3°43′22″W	1288903	Upload Photo
Church of St Sabinus (Woolacombe Church)	Woolacombe, Mortehoe	Parish Church	1910	14 November 1985	SS4613443808; 51°10′22″N 4°12′09″W	1162825	Church of St Sabinus (Woolacombe Church) More images
Court House and Garden Wall adjoining to North East	North Molton	House	Late 17th century	9 June 1952	SS7362929925; 51°03′17″N 3°48′16″W	1214330	Court House and Garden Wall adjoining to North East More images
Higher Thornham Farmhouse and attached Farmbuildings	Romansleigh	Farmhouse	Circa early 16th century	20 February 1967	SS7360818213; 50°56′58″N 3°48′02″W	1171246	Upload Photo
Lower Kingstree	Romansleigh	Farmhouse	Circa late 15th century or early 16th century	20 February 1967	SS7148619456; 50°57′37″N 3°49′53″W	1171258	Upload Photo
Church of St Peter	Rose Ash	Stocks	Possibly 14th century	20 February 1967	SS7875821697; 50°58′55″N 3°43′43″W	1107227	Church of St Peter More images
North Yarde	Rose Ash	Kitchen	Late medieval	18 October 1988	SS7717721244; 50°58′39″N 3°45′03″W	1163493	Upload Photo
Church of St John	Warkleigh, Satterleigh and Warkleigh	Sundial	Probably 13th century fabric	20 February 1967	SS6423222799; 50°59′19″N 3°56′09″W	1258818	Church of St John More images
Pair of Lodges 700 Metres East of Youlston Park	Shirwell	Gate Lodge	Late 18th century	25 February 1965	SS5909237386; 51°07′06″N 4°00′53″W	1107132	Pair of Lodges 700 Metres East of Youlston Park
Chapel at Honiton Barton	South Molton	Chapel	c. 1730	20 August 1951	SS6888724278; 51°00′10″N 3°52′12″W	1106861	Upload Photo
Honiton Barton	South Molton	House	1676	20 August 1951	SS6890724264; 51°00′10″N 3°52′11″W	1106860	Upload Photo
Kingsland Barton	South Molton	Farmhouse	c. 1640	31 October 1986	SS6989525903; 51°01′04″N 3°51′22″W	1317806	Upload Photo
Public Market and Assembly Room	South Molton	Assembly Rooms	1863	20 August 1951	SS7142625793; 51°01′02″N 3°50′04″W	1317914	Public Market and Assembly Room More images
Apiary, 15 Metres South-east of Glebe House	Stoke Rivers	Apiary	Early-mid 19th century	18 March 1986	SS6330935335; 51°06′04″N 3°57′13″W	1107661	Upload Photo
Bydown House	Swimbridge	Country House	Early 19th century	25 February 1965	SS6229229394; 51°02′50″N 3°57′57″W	1107662	Bydown House More images
Cob Cottage and the Cottage Including Outbuilding to Rear	Swimbridge	Farmhouse	Late C15/early 16th century	18 March 1986	SS6130726487; 51°01′16″N 3°58′44″W	1325296	Upload Photo
Dean Head, including Apple Store and Coal Shed to Rear	Swimbridge	Farmhouse	Early 16th century	18 March 1986	SS6245833668; 51°05′09″N 3°57′55″W	1107663	Upload Photo
Hannaford House	Hannaford, Swimbridge	House	c. 1760	25 February 1965	SS6069829821; 51°03′03″N 3°59′20″W	1107635	Hannaford House
Kerscott Farmhouse	Swimbridge	Farmhouse	Early 16th century	18 March 1986	SS6317029405; 51°02′52″N 3°57′12″W	1317304	Upload Photo
Marsh Farmhouse, including Rear Wall to Rear Court Yard	Swimbridge	Farmhouse	15th century	18 March 1986	SS6125630194; 51°03′15″N 3°58′52″W	1165476	Upload Photo
Stowford Farmhouse	East Stowford, Swimbridge	Farmhouse	Late 16th century or early 17th century	18 March 1986	SS6324826703; 51°01′24″N 3°57′05″W	1165612	Upload Photo
Fishleigh Barton Farmhouse	Tawstock	Farmhouse	14th century	25 February 1965	SS5844424934; 51°00′23″N 4°01′08″W	1253607	Upload Photo
Gatehouse to Tawstock Court	Tawstock	Gatehouse	1574	25 February 1965	SS5577629843; 51°02′59″N 4°03′32″W	1253770	Gatehouse to Tawstock Court More images
Wick Farmhouse	Tawstock	Farmhouse	19th century	11 June 1975	SS5703327169; 51°01′34″N 4°02′24″W	1253698	Upload Photo
Church of St Peter	Trentishoe	Parish Church	15th century	25 February 1965	SS6465248609; 51°13′14″N 3°56′22″W	1325745	Church of St Peter More images
Church of St Michael and All Angels	Great Torrington	Parish Church	13th century	19 March 1951	SS4950519196; 50°57′09″N 4°08′38″W	1104787	Church of St Michael and All Angels More images
Badlake Farmhouse	West Anstey	Farmhouse	early to mid 15th century	20 February 1967	SS8571927482; 51°02′07″N 3°37′53″W	1107322	Upload Photo
Church of St Petrock	West Anstey	Parish Church	14th century	20 February 1967	SS8521427490; 51°02′07″N 3°38′18″W	1305803	Church of St Petrock More images
Manor House	West Down	Manor House	Late 16th century	25 February 1965	SS5167242020; 51°09′29″N 4°07′21″W	1162928	Upload Photo
Eastleigh Barton including Rear Garden Wall Containing Two Bee Boles	Eastleigh, Westleigh	Farmhouse	Early 16th century	29 May 1986	SS4887127907; 51°01′50″N 4°09′24″W	1318076	Upload Photo
Eastleigh Manor House, including Ha Ha to Front on South and East Sides	Eastleigh, Westleigh	Manor House	Late 15th century or Early 16th century	25 February 1965	SS4881628003; 51°01′53″N 4°09′27″W	1107611	Eastleigh Manor House, including Ha Ha to Front on South and East Sides More images
Southcott Barton	Southcott, Westleigh	Farmhouse	c. 1600	25 February 1965	SS4690427574; 51°01′38″N 4°11′04″W	1107574	Southcott Barton More images
Tapeley Park House	Tapeley Park, Westleigh	Country House	18th century	25 February 1965	SS4777829084; 51°02′27″N 4°10′22″W	1325332	Tapeley Park House More images
East Pilliven Farmhouse and Outbuilding	Witheridge	Farmhouse	13th century or 14th century	20 February 1967	SS8236415168; 50°55′26″N 3°40′30″W	1325504	Upload Photo
