= Deanery of South Molton =

The Deanery of South Molton is part of the Archdeaconry of Barnstaple, one of the four archdeaconries in the Diocese of Exeter.

== Parishes of the South Molton Deanery ==
The parishes of the South Molton Deanery are:

- Bishop's Nympton
- Burrington, Devon
- Charles, Devon
- Chawleigh
- Cheldon
- Chittlehamholt
- Chittlehampton with Umberleigh
- Chulmleigh
- East Anstey
- East Worlington
- Filleigh
- High Bray
- King's Nympton
- Knowstone
- Mariansleigh
- Meshaw
- Molland
- North Molton with Twitchen, Devon
- Rose Ash
- South Molton with Nymet St George (George Nympton)
- Thelbridge
- Warkleigh with Satterleigh (Satterleigh and Warkleigh)
- Wembworthy with Eggesford
- West Worlington
- Witheridge with Creacombe and Romansleigh
