= North Devon =

Coordinates: 51.081°N 4.058°W

North Devon District
- Non-metropolitan district
- North Devon shown within Devon
- Sovereign state: United Kingdom
- Constituent country: England
- Region: South West England
- Non-metropolitan county: Devon
- Status: Non-metropolitan district
- Admin HQ: Barnstaple
- Incorporated: 1 April 1974

Government
  - Type: Non-metropolitan district council
  - Body: North Devon Council
  - Member of Parliament: Ian Roome (LD)

Area
  - Total: 419.3 sq mi (1,085.9 km^{2})
  - Rank: 23rd (of 296)

Population (2025)
  - Total: 101,281
  - Rank: 247th (of 296)
  - Density: 241.57/sq mi (93.269/km^{2})
  - Ethnicity: 97% White (94.4% White British)
- Time zone: UTC0 (GMT)
  - Summer (DST): UTC+1 (BST)
- ONS code: 18UE (ONS); E07000043 (GSS)
- OS grid reference: SS5586233371

North Devon is a local government district in Devon, England. Its council is based just outside Barnstaple, the district's largest town. The district also includes the towns of Ilfracombe, Lynton and Lynmouth and South Molton along with numerous villages, seaside resorts and surrounding rural areas.

The east of the district includes part of the Exmoor National Park, and the district's coast is also recognised for its natural beauty, forming part of the North Devon Coast, an Area of Outstanding Natural Beauty.

The district borders Torridge to the south-west, Mid Devon to the south-east, and the neighbouring county of Somerset to the east.

The term "North Devon" can also be used to describe a wider geographic area than the local government district, often including neighbouring Torridge District, based in Bideford.

== History ==
The district was formed on 1 April 1974 under the Local Government Act 1972. The new district covered the area of five former districts, which were all abolished at the same time:

- Barnstaple Municipal Borough
- Barnstaple Rural District
- Ilfracombe Urban District
- Lynton Urban District
- South Molton Rural District

The new district was named North Devon, reflecting its position within the wider county. Since 2009 the council has styled itself "North Devon Council" rather than its full formal name of "North Devon District Council".

The current districts of North Devon and Torridge (apart from Holsworthy) were originally planned to be a single district. It was then decided to make them two districts and extract Holsworthy from West Devon and add it to Torridge.

Under current local government restructuring plans it is planned that the district will be abolished in 2028 with its area becoming part of a new Devon unitary authority.

== Governance ==
North Devon Council

Type
- Type: Non-metropolitan district council

History
- Founded: 1 April 1974

Leadership
- Chair: David Worden, Liberal Democrats since 22 April 2026
- Leader: David Clayton, Liberal Democrats since 17 July 2024
- Chief Executive: Ken Miles since 2019

Structure
- Seats: 42 councillors
- Political groups: Administration (24) Liberal Democrat (24) Other parties (20) Conservative (7) Green Party (3) Independents (8)

Elections
- Voting system: First past the post
- Last election: 4 May 2023

Meeting place
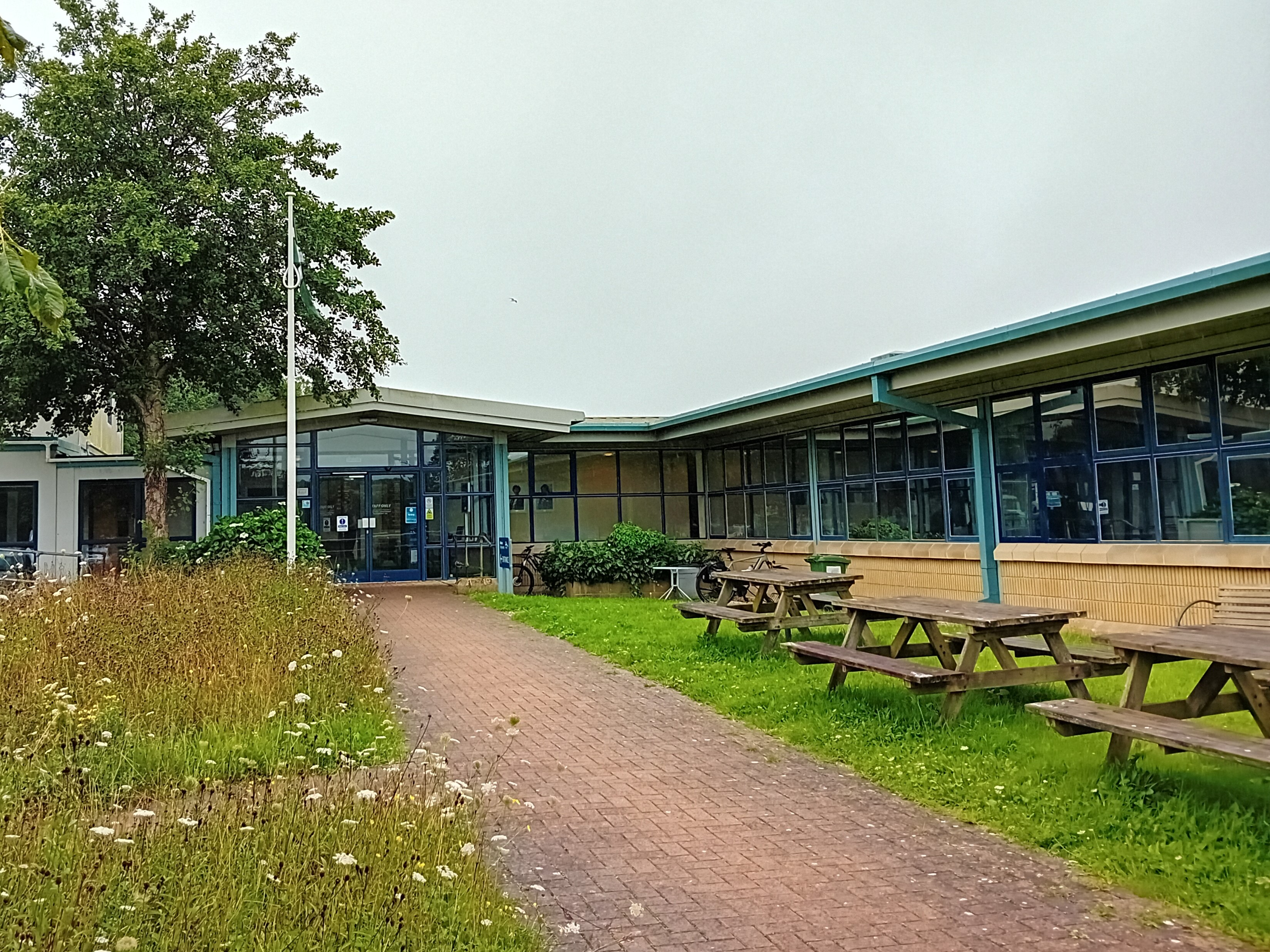
- Brynsworthy Environment Centre, Roundswell, Barnstaple, EX31 3NP

Website
- www.northdevon.gov.uk

Constitution
- Constitution for North Devon Council

North Devon Council provides district-level services, including the administration of council tax and local benefits, the provision of car parking services, the collection of refuse and the recycling of waste, planning and building control, housing services, the provision of sport and leisure facilities, environmental services, business-related services and contingency planning. The council also runs and maintains the North Devon Crematorium. County-level services are provided by Devon County Council. The whole district is also covered by civil parishes, which form a third tier of local government.

In the parts of the district within the Exmoor National Park, town planning is the responsibility of the Exmoor National Park Authority. The district council appoints two of its councillors to serve on the 22-person National Park Authority.

=== Political control ===
The council has been under Liberal Democrat majority control since 2019.

The first election to the council was held in 1973, initially operating as a shadow authority before coming into its powers on 1 April 1974. Political control of the council since 1974 has been as follows:

Party in control	Years
Independent	1974–1987
No overall control	1987–1991
Liberal Democrats	1991–2007
Conservative	2007–2011
No overall control	2011–2019
Liberal Democrats	2019–present

=== Leadership ===
The leaders of the council since 1991 have been:

Councillor	Party	From	To
Malcolm Prowse	Liberal Democrats	1991	2007
Michael Harrison	Conservative	2007	2009
Des Brailey	Conservative	2009	2011
Brian Greenslade	Liberal Democrats	2011	2015
Des Brailey	Conservative	2015	May 2019
David Worden	Liberal Democrats	16 May 2019	May 2023
Ian Roome	Liberal Democrats	18 May 2023	Jul 2024
David Clayton	Liberal Democrats	17 Jul 2024	

=== Composition ===
Following the 2023 election, and subsequent by-elections and changes of allegiance up to April 2026, the composition of the council was:

Party	Councillors
Liberal Democrats	24
Conservative	7
Green	3
Independent	8
Total	42

The independent councillors and Greens sit together as the "North Devon Independent Group".

=== Premises ===
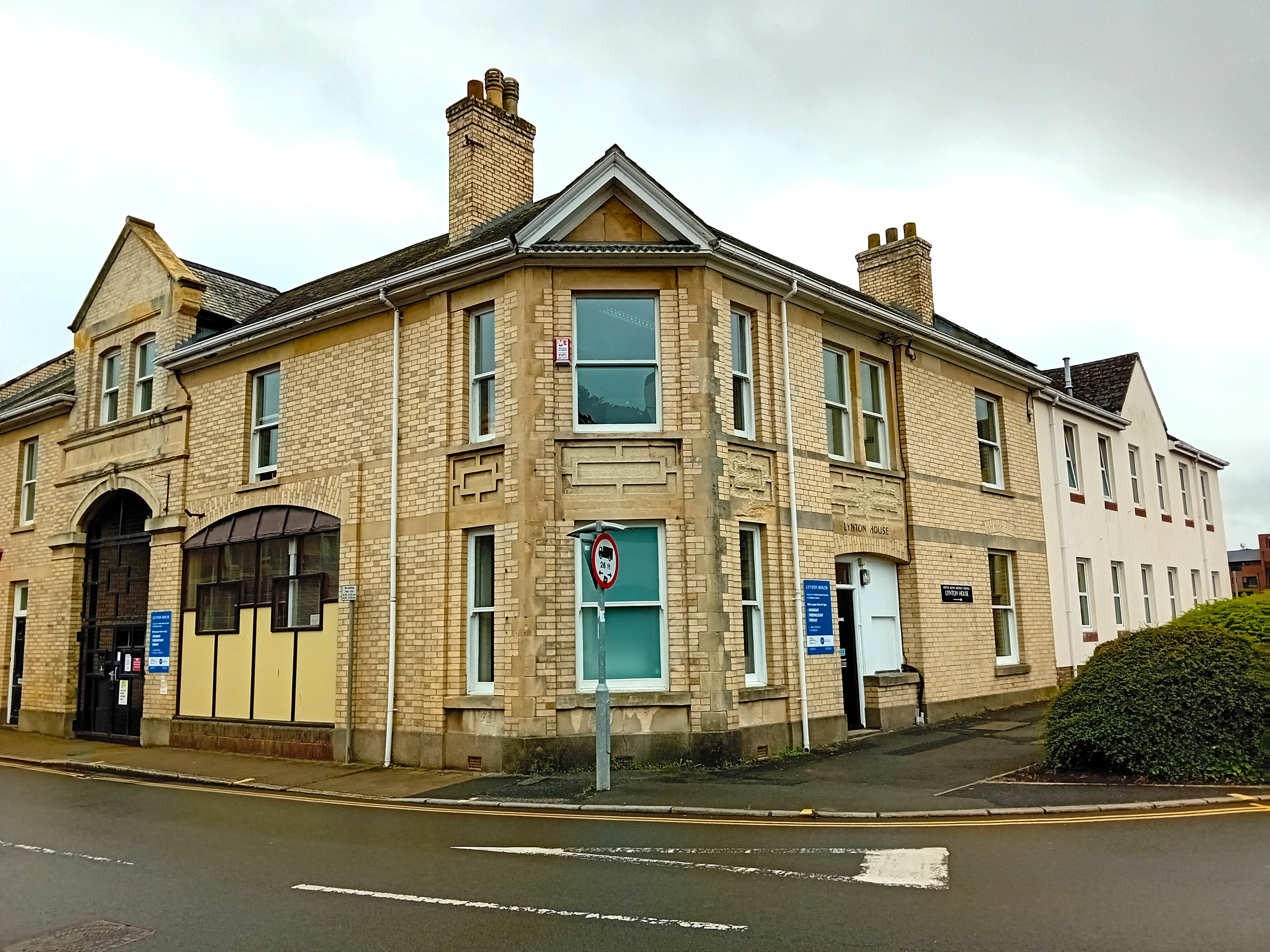
Lynton House: Council's former customer service centre in Barnstaple

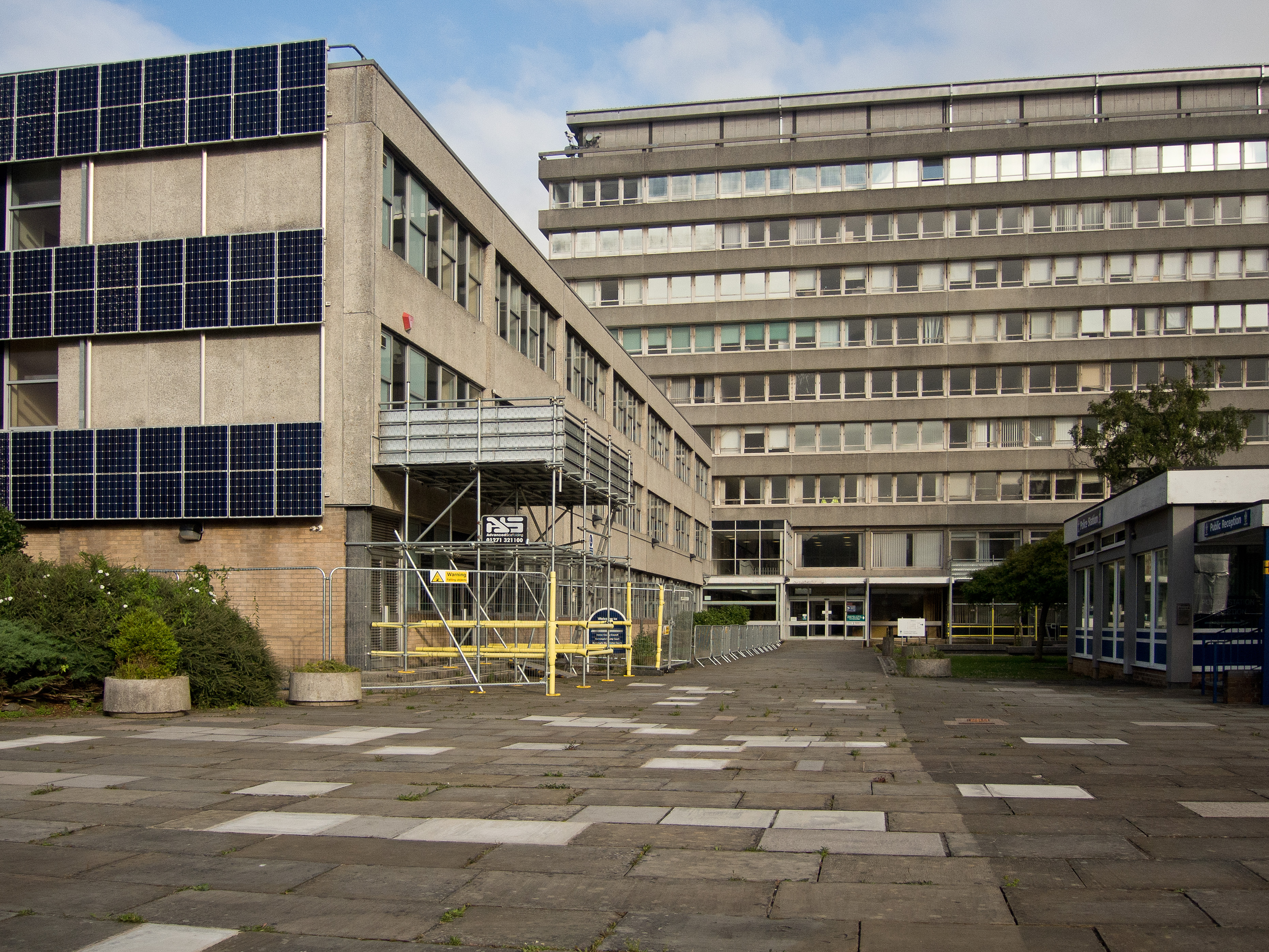
Barnstaple Civic Centre: Council's headquarters until 2015.

The council's main offices are at the Brynsworthy Environment Centre near Barnstaple (the building is in the parish of Fremington). The council moved there in 2015, having previously been based at the Civic Centre on North Walk in Barnstaple, which had been built in 1969 as joint offices for two of North Devon's predecessor councils, Barnstaple Town Council and Barnstaple Rural District Council. The council's main customer service centre is located at Green Lanes Shopping Centre.

The former customer service centre, Lynton House, remains operational as non-public office. It also maintains area offices in Ilfracombe and South Molton.

== Elections ==
Since the last boundary changes in 2019, the council has comprised 42 councillors representing 25 wards, with each ward returning between one and three councillors. Some wards are coterminous with civil parishes, though most consist of multiple parishes or parts of parishes. Elections are held every four years. The following table lists the electoral wards of North Devon and the associated civil parishes.

Ward	Civil Parishes	No. of councillors
Barnstaple Central	Barnstaple (part)	1
Barnstaple With Pilton	Barnstaple (part); Pilton West	3
Barnstaple With Westacott	Barnstaple (part); Landkey (part)	3
Bickington	Fremington (part)	3
Bishop's Nympton	Bishop's Nympton; East Anstey; George Nympton; Knowstone; Mariansleigh; Queen's Nympton; Rose Ash; West Anstey	1
Bratton Fleming	Arlington; Bratton Fleming; Challacombe; Goodleigh; Kentisbury; Loxhore; Stoke Rivers	1
Braunton East	Braunton (part)	2
Braunton West & Georgeham	Braunton (part); Georgeham	2
Chittlehampton	Atherington; Chittlehamholt; Chittlehampton; Filleigh; King's Nympton; Satterleigh and Warkleigh; Swimbridge (part)	1
Chulmleigh	Burrington; Chulmleigh; Romansleigh	1
Combe Martin	Combe Martin	1
Fremington	Fremington (part)	2
Heanton Punchardon	Ashford; Heanton Punchardon	1
Ilfracombe East	Ilfracombe (part)	3
Ilfracombe West	Ilfracombe (part)	2
Instow	Horwood, Lovacott and Newton Tracey; Instow; Tawstock (part); Westleigh	1
Landkey	Bishop's Tawton; Landkey (part); Swimbridge (part)	2
Lynton & Lynmouth	Brendon and Countisbury; Lynton and Lynmouth; Martinhoe; Parracombe; Trentishoe	1
Marwood	Berrynarbor; Bittadon; East Down; Marwood; Shirwell	1
Mortehoe	Mortehoe; West Down	1
Newport	Barnstaple (part)	2
North Molton	Brayford; East and West Buckland; Molland; North Molton; Twitchen	1
Roundswell	Barnstaple (part); Tawstock (part)	2
South Molton	South Molton	3
Witheridge	East Worlington; Meshaw; Rackenford; Witheridge	1

== Towns and parishes ==
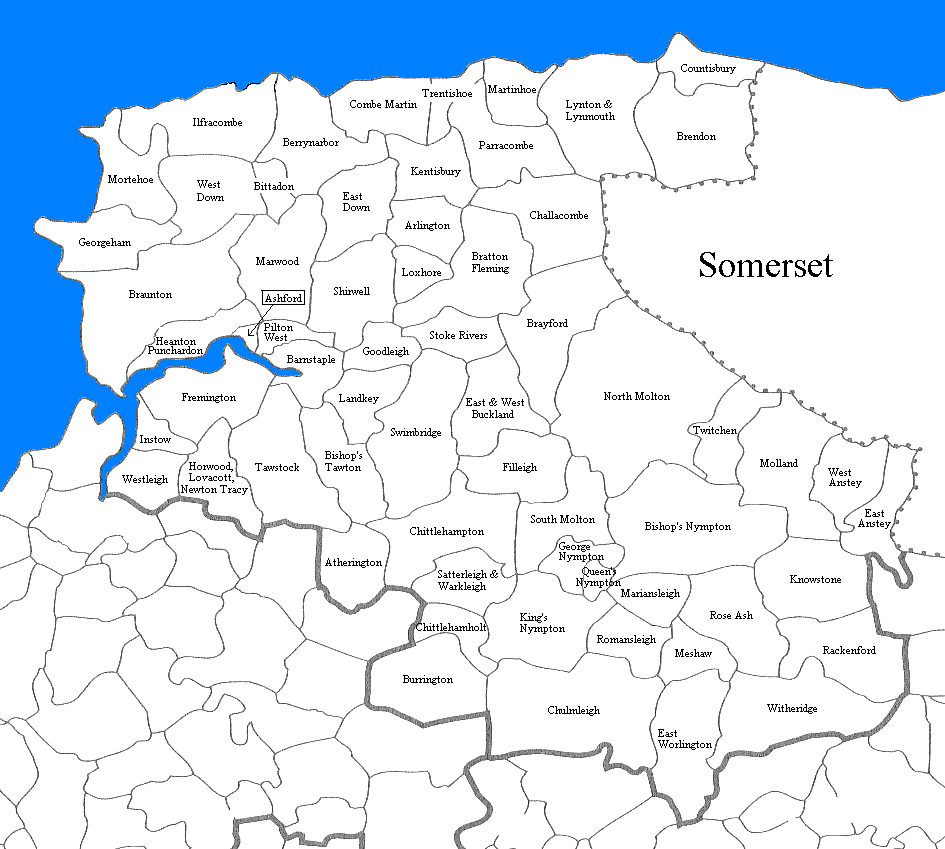
Parishes of North Devon

The whole district is covered by civil parishes. The parish councils for Barnstaple, Ilfracombe, Lynton and Lynmouth, and South Molton are styled "town councils". Some of the smaller parishes have a parish meeting rather than a parish council.

== Demography ==
North Devon is popular with retired people. The 2011 census showed that 18% of residents were aged 15 years and under, 60% were aged 16–64 and 23% were aged 65 and over. This compares to the 20% of the population who were aged 65 and over when the 2001 census was taken. For comparison, the same age distributions across England were 19%, 64% and 17% respectively. Life expectancy for men, at 77.7, is close to the English average. Female life expectancy is good at 83.1, around 1 year above the English average.

There is a gap of six years in the life expectancy of men in the least deprived fifth of wards and the most deprived fifth. The region has one of the most ethnically homogenous populations in England, with 97.9% reporting their ethnicity as 'white' in the 2011 census of the population. However, this is a decrease on the 99.0% of the population who declared themselves to be white on the 2001 census.

== Transport ==
Along with its neighbours to the east, West Somerset, and west, Torridge, North Devon has fairly sparse transport links. The Beeching cuts in the mid-sixties left the branch line to Exeter as the area's only railway service. Despite being served by only one railway line, the district is served by 5 railway stations, which is a large number, comparable with more urbanised boroughs such as Plymouth and Mid Devon. However sizeable settlements of Braunton and Ilfracombe as well as Bideford are cut off from the Network Rail system.

The district is served by three A roads. The primary link is the A361 (known locally as the Link Road) which was constructed between 1986 and 1989. It heads north-west from the M5 motorway, past South Molton, to Barnstaple. From here the A361 classification continues northwards along older roads to Ilfracombe, and the modern Link Road continues westwards from Barnstaple as the A39 where it is designated the Atlantic Highway, and runs via Bideford into Cornwall. The eastern section of the A39 links Barnstaple to Lynton, then crosses the northern coastal hills of Exmoor into Somerset.

The other two A roads in North Devon are the A399, a minor local route between Ilfracombe and South Molton (used as a de facto Barnstaple-bypass to Ilfracombe and Woolacombe), and the A377, which is the main road between Barnstaple and the county town of Devon, Exeter.

Due to significant peak time traffic delays in Barnstaple, and severe congestion at both peak and non-peak times in the summer when tourist traffic is at its busiest, the Barnstaple Western Bypass was opened in 2007.

== Economy ==
North Devon is some distance from the UK's traditional areas of industrial activity and population yet boasts some major manufacturing sites that export around the world, among them TDK Lambda and Pall Europe in Ilfracombe, Eaton Aerospace and Norbord in South Molton, Perrigo in Braunton and multiple businesses in Barnstaple. Due to the historically agricultural nature of the economy alongside a strong tourism industry employment can be seasonal. As a result, some areas of North Devon are considered deprived. The overall average income for the district is 80% of the average for the United Kingdom as a whole.

The 1989 opening of the new Link Road connection to the motorway network helped to promote trade, but it had a temporary detrimental effect on a number of distribution businesses. The latter had previously viewed the town as a base for local distribution networks, a need that was removed with an approximate halving of travelling time to the M5 motorway. The region adapted: in 2005 unemployment in North Devon was 1.8–2.4% but in 2018 unemployment in North Devon had come down significantly since its 2010 high to 1.1%. Median weekly full-time pay is £440 per week, the average house price is £230,000 and the number of businesses registered has increased to 4895, up 370 from 2010. 2018 has seen significant Government investment in the area through Coastal Community grants and Housing Infrastructure funds, as well as £83 million to further upgrade the North Devon Link Road.

Barnstaple is the main shopping area for North Devon. There are many chain stores in the town centre and in the Roundswell Business Park, on the western fringe of the town. The multimillion-pound redevelopment of the former Leaderflush Shapland works at Anchorwood Bank, and the surrounding area, is creating a conservation area near the River Taw, hundreds of new homes, a commercial retail area with new shops, restaurants and leisure facilities.

The largest employer in the region is local and central Government. The two main government employers in the area are the Royal Marines Base Chivenor, 3 miles (4.8 km) west of the town, and North Devon District Hospital, 1 mile (1.6 km) to the north.

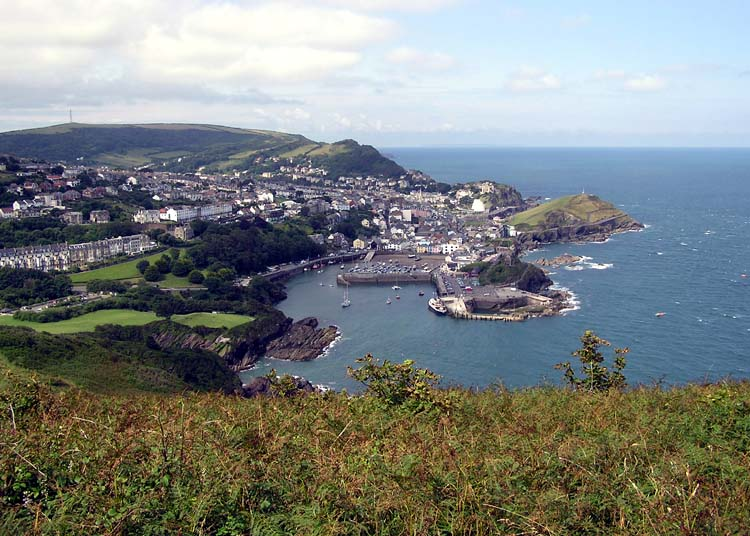
Ilfracombe, seen from 447 feet (136 metres) above. The viewpoint (Hillsborough) is part of the South West Coastal Path

== Barnstaple ==
Barnstaple is on the River Taw estuary, and functions as the main service centre for North Devon. The parish of Barnstaple had a population of 97,214 at the 2011 census. The wider Barnstaple Built-Up Area was estimated to have a population of 32,411 in 2018, whilst the Barnstaple Town Area, which contains satellite settlements such as Bishop's Tawton, Fremington and Landkey, has a population of 46,619 (as of 2020).

== Landmarks ==
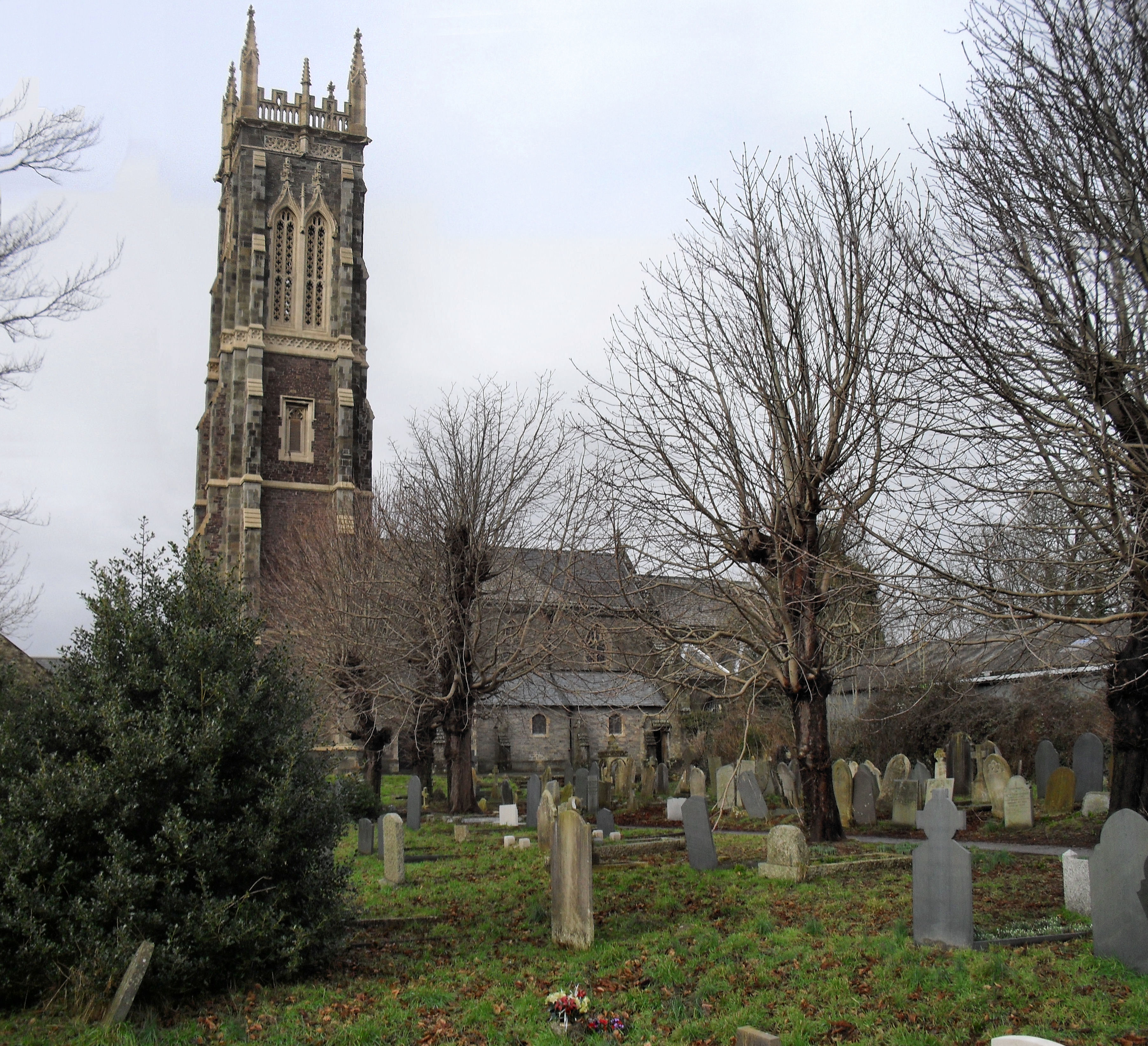
Holy Trinity Church

Holy Trinity Church is an Anglican parish church for Barnstaple in north Devon. Dating from 1867 with an earlier tower from 1843 to 1845, the church comes under the Diocese of Exeter and has been a Grade II* listed building since 1981.

Watermouth Castle is a building in Watermouth, near Ilfracombe in North Devon, designed by George Wightwick as a residence for the Bassett family in the mid-19th century and is not a true castle but a country house built to resemble one. It has been designated as a Grade II* listed building.

Whitechapel is an ancient former manor within the parish of Bishops Nympton, in north Devon. It was the earliest known residence of the locally influential Bassett family until 1603. The core of the present manor house is late 16th or early 17th century, with later additions and alterations, and was classed as Grade I listed on 9 June 1952.

=== Places of interest ===
- The Guildhall
- Ash Barton Estate
- Hawkridge
- Affeton Castle
- Castle Hill House
- Lynton Town Hall

== See also ==
- Grade I listed buildings in North Devon
- Grade II* listed buildings in North Devon
- South West Coast Path
- Tarka Trail
- Valley of Rocks
- Lee Bay
