= West Anstey =

Village in Devon, England

Coordinates: 51.035009°N 3.6385427°W

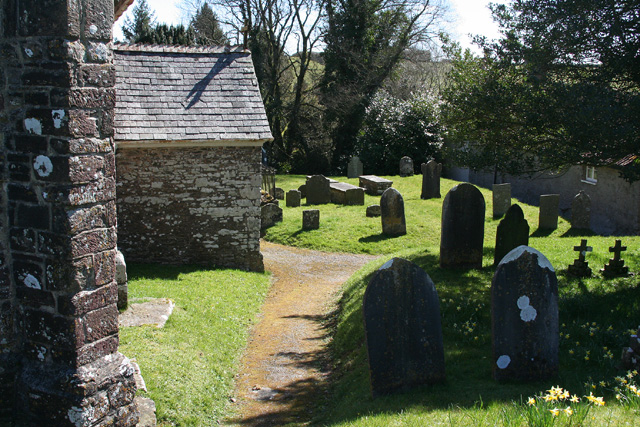
- churchyard

- Location within Devon
- Area: 12.1938 km^{2} (4.7081 sq mi)
- Population: 163 (2011 census)
  - Density: 13/km^{2} (34/sq mi)
- Civil parish: West Anstey
- District: North Devon
- Shire county: Devon
- Region: South West
- Country: England
- Sovereign state: United Kingdom
- Post town: South Molton
- Postcode district: EX36
- Police: Devon and Cornwall
- Fire: Devon and Somerset
- Ambulance: South Western
- UK Parliament: North Devon

West Anstey is a village and civil parish on the River Yeo, about 5 miles west of Dulverton, in the North Devon district, in the county of Devon, England. In 2011 the parish had a population of 163. The parish touches Molland, East Anstey and Withypool and Hawkridge.

== Features ==
There are 26 listed buildings in West Anstey, In 1881 it had its own postman and school.

== History ==
Anstey was recorded in the Domesday Book as Anestinge. The name "Anstey" probably means 'steep narrow footpath'. Alternative names for West Anstey are "Anstey West" and "Anstey". The parish was historically in the South Molton hundred.
