= Rose Ash =

Village in Devon, England

Coordinates: 50.9821°N 3.7275°W

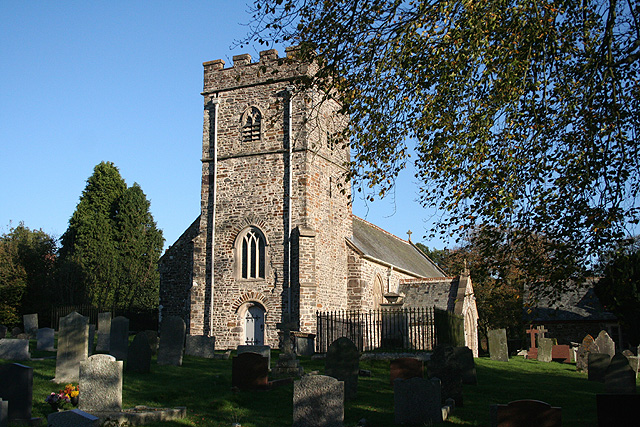
- The Grade II* listed parish church, Victorian with medieval tower

- Location within Devon
- Population: 298 (2011 census)
- Civil parish: Rose Ash
- District: North Devon
- Shire county: Devon
- Region: South West
- Country: England
- Sovereign state: United Kingdom

Rose Ash, formerly Ralph-Esse, is a village and civil parish in North Devon district, Devon, England. In the 2011 census the parish was recorded as having a population of 298.

The neighbouring parishes are Bishop's Nympton to the north, Knowstone and Rackenford to the east, East Worlington to the south, and Meshaw and Mariansleigh to the west.

There are 40 listed buildings in the parish. South Yarde farmhouse is believed to be late 15th or early 16th century and is Grade I listed, and the adjacent North Yarde house, Grade II* listed, was "probably originally the kitchen range to South Yarde". The parish church of St Peter is Grade II* listed: it was rebuilt in 1889–1892 but retains its medieval tower and north aisle. The other listed buildings, including the village hall and the former school and school-house, are Grade II.

There was previously a school in the village, which opened in 1878 as Rose Ash Board School, changed its name to Rose Ash Council School, and closed in 1948. Its archives are held at North Devon Record Office.

Rose Ash Post Office and shop closed in the 1970s.
