= Queen's Nympton =

Village in Devon, England

Coordinates: 50.989°N 3.827°W

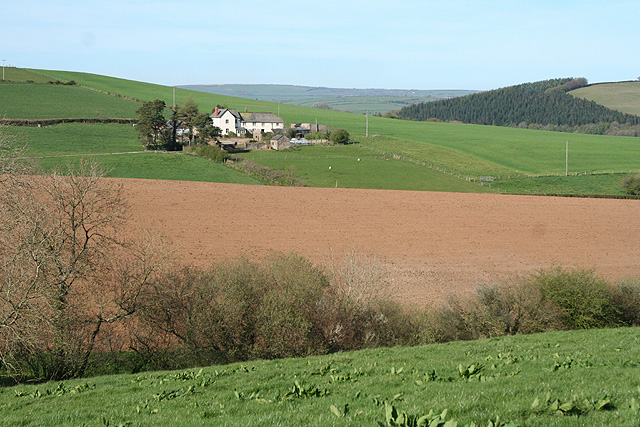
- Queen's Nympton: towards Little Frenchstone

- Location within Devon
- Population: 32 (2001 census)
- Civil parish: Queen's Nympton
- District: North Devon
- Shire county: Devon
- Region: South West
- Country: England
- Sovereign state: United Kingdom

Queen's Nympton or Queensnympton is a small civil parish in the North Devon district of Devon, England. According to the 2001 census it had a population of 32. There is no actual settlement by the name - the parish was originally an exclave of South Molton, but was split to form a separate civil parish in 1894.

From northwards clockwise, the parish borders George Nympton, Bishop's Nympton, Mariansleigh, and King's Nympton.
