= Bittadon =

Civil parish in Devon, England

Coordinates: 51°09′N 4°05′W

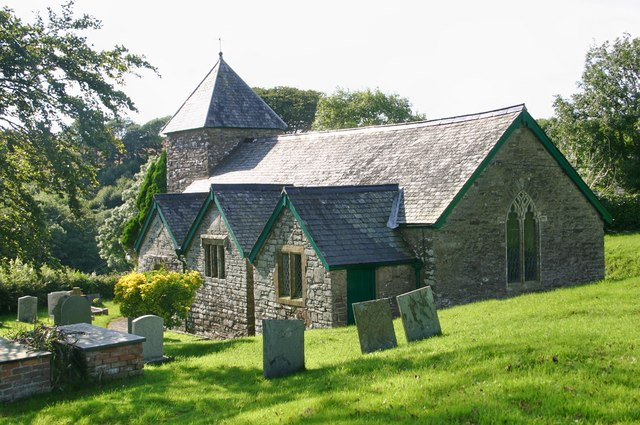
St Peter's Church, Bittadon

Bittadon is a civil parish and former manor in the North Devon district of Devon, England. According to the 2001 census the parish had a population of 45. It is about seven miles north of Barnstaple and is surrounded clockwise from the north by the parishes of Berrynarbor, Marwood and West Down.

During the reign of King John (1199–1216), the manor was held by the de Bittadon family. They remained seated there for six generations. The Lovering family next acquired Bittadon, followed by the Luttrell family. This was a junior branch of the Luttrells of Dunster Castle in Somerset. In about 1635, Bittadon was held by the Chichester family, the senior branch of which was seated at Raleigh, Pilton, near Barnstaple.
