= Chittlehamholt =

Village in Devon, England

Coordinates: 50.9724°N 3.9251°W

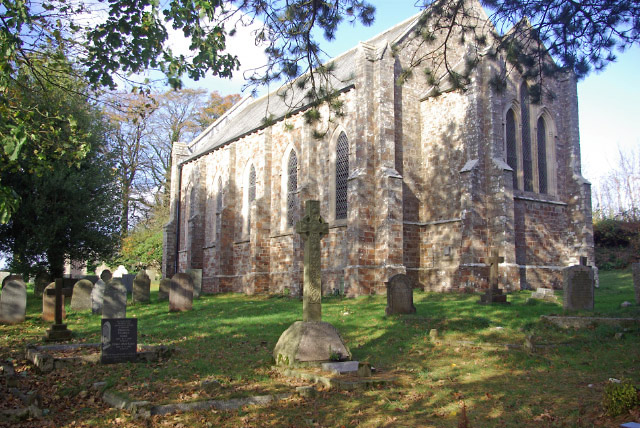
- Church of St John Baptist, Chittlehamholt

- Location within Devon
- Population: 169 (2011 census)
- Civil parish: Chittlehamholt
- District: North Devon
- Shire county: Devon
- Region: South West
- Country: England
- Sovereign state: United Kingdom

Chittlehamholt is a village and civil parish in North Devon district, Devon, England. In the 2011 census it was recorded as having a population of 169.

The neighbouring parishes are Satterleigh and Warkleigh to the north, King's Nympton to the east, Chulmleigh to the south east, Burrington to the south, and High Bickington in Torridge district to the west. The River Taw forms the southern and western boundary of the parish, and the A377 road from Barnstaple to Exeter skirts the parish on the far side of the river.

A combined parish council serves Chittlehamholt and the neighbouring parish as the Chittlehamholt, Satterleigh and Warkleigh Parish Council.

There are 26 listed buildings in the parish, all at Grade II. They include two bridges, the church of St John Baptist, a Gospel Hall, Chittlehamholt Manor, the Exeter Inn (a 16th-century coaching inn) and houses and farm buildings.

The hamlet of Chittlehamholt was originally a clearing in woods where residents of Chittlehampton collected logs. Until 1875 it was part of Chittlehampton.

The parish church of St John the Baptist is part of the South Molton Mission Community within the Diocese of Exeter.
