= Lynton and Lynmouth =

Area of Devon

Coordinates: 51.229°N 3.833°W

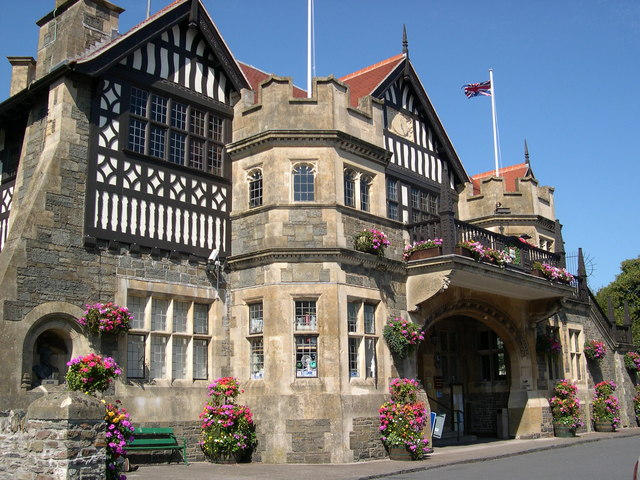
- Lynton Town Hall

- Location within Devon
- Area: 30.5 km^{2} (11.8 sq mi)
- Population: 1,405 (2021 census)
  - Density: 46/km^{2} (120/sq mi)
- Civil parish: Lynton and Lynmouth
- District: North Devon
- Shire county: Devon
- Region: South West
- Country: England
- Sovereign state: United Kingdom

W. I. Lincoln Adams photographed the landscape around the two villages in the summer of 1909. He compared the drive through the Valley of Rocks and along the cliff road with the Axenstrasse over Lake Lucerne, considering the Devon drive "the more wonderful, both as an engineering feat in road-building, and in the grandeur and sublimity of the scenery".

Lynton and Lynmouth is a civil parish in the North Devon district of Devon, England. The parish is named after its two main settlements of Lynton, which stands on a plateau above the Glen Lyn Gorge, and Lynmouth which lies at the foot of the gorge where the West Lyn River and East Lyn River converge and then meet the sea. The two are connected by the Lynton and Lynmouth Cliff Railway, a water-powered funicular railway.

The area is also sometimes poetically termed Little Switzerland, on account of the scenic landscape which was considered by early tourists to resemble the landscapes of Switzerland. The parish lies within Exmoor National Park.

In 1952 it was the scene of the devastating Lynmouth flood when in one night 35 people were killed and a further 420 were made homeless. Over 100 buildings and 28 bridges were destroyed.

The parish council has designated the parish to be a town, and so calls itself Lynton and Lynmouth Town Council. The parish was just called Lynton prior to 1976. In 2021 the parish had a population of 1,405.

== Little Switzerland and tourism ==
The Little Switzerland term refers to the coast and countryside around Lynton and Lynmouth, including the Valley of Rocks, Watersmeet and Heddon Valley. The resemblance was popularised by the Romantic Movement poets Wordsworth, Coleridge, Shelley and Southey:

From the Summerhouse Hill between the two is a prospect most magnificent - on either hand, combes and river; before, the beautiful little village, which, I am assured by one who is familiar with Switzerland, resembles a Swiss village".

Southey had travelled to Lynton in 1799, journeying along the Exmoor coast via Porlock, and staying at one of Lynton's Inns. The poet's praise of Lynton and Lynmouth was used in publicity as the "English Switzerland" for the developing tourism industry, while his likening of the area to Switzerland sparked off a fashion for building in a Swiss style.

Lynton and Lynmouth became popular with tourists in the early 1800s when the Napoleonic Wars closed mainland Europe to British travellers; unable to make their Grand Tour due to the conflict, visitors to Lynton and Lynmouth found the area evocative of their earlier sojourns in the Alps en route to Italy.

The South West Coast Path and Tarka Trail pass through, while the Two Moors Way, Samaritans Way South West and the Coleridge Way all finish there. The twin villages are also the centre for the 21 Mile Drive figure of eight scenic route around Little Switzerland.

== Governance ==
There are three tiers of local government covering Lynton and Lynmouth, at parish, district and county level: Lynton and Lynmouth Town Council, North Devon District Council and Devon County Council.

Prior to 1976 the parish was just called Lynton. The parish of Lynton was designated a local government district in 1866, governed by an elected local board. Local boards were reconstituted as urban district councils in 1894. The Urban District Council built itself Lynton Town Hall on Lee Road in Lynton in 1900 to serve as its headquarters. Lynton Urban District Council was abolished in 1974 to become part of the new district of North Devon.

A successor parish called Lynton was established to cover the former urban district. The parish was renamed "Lynton and Lynmouth" on 12 January 1976. The parish council has resolved that the parish shall have the status of a town, allowing the council to take the name "Lynton and Lynmouth Town Council" and the chair of the council to take the title of mayor. The town council continues to be based at Lynton Town Hall.
