= Lynton Town Hall =

Municipal building in Lynton, Devon, England

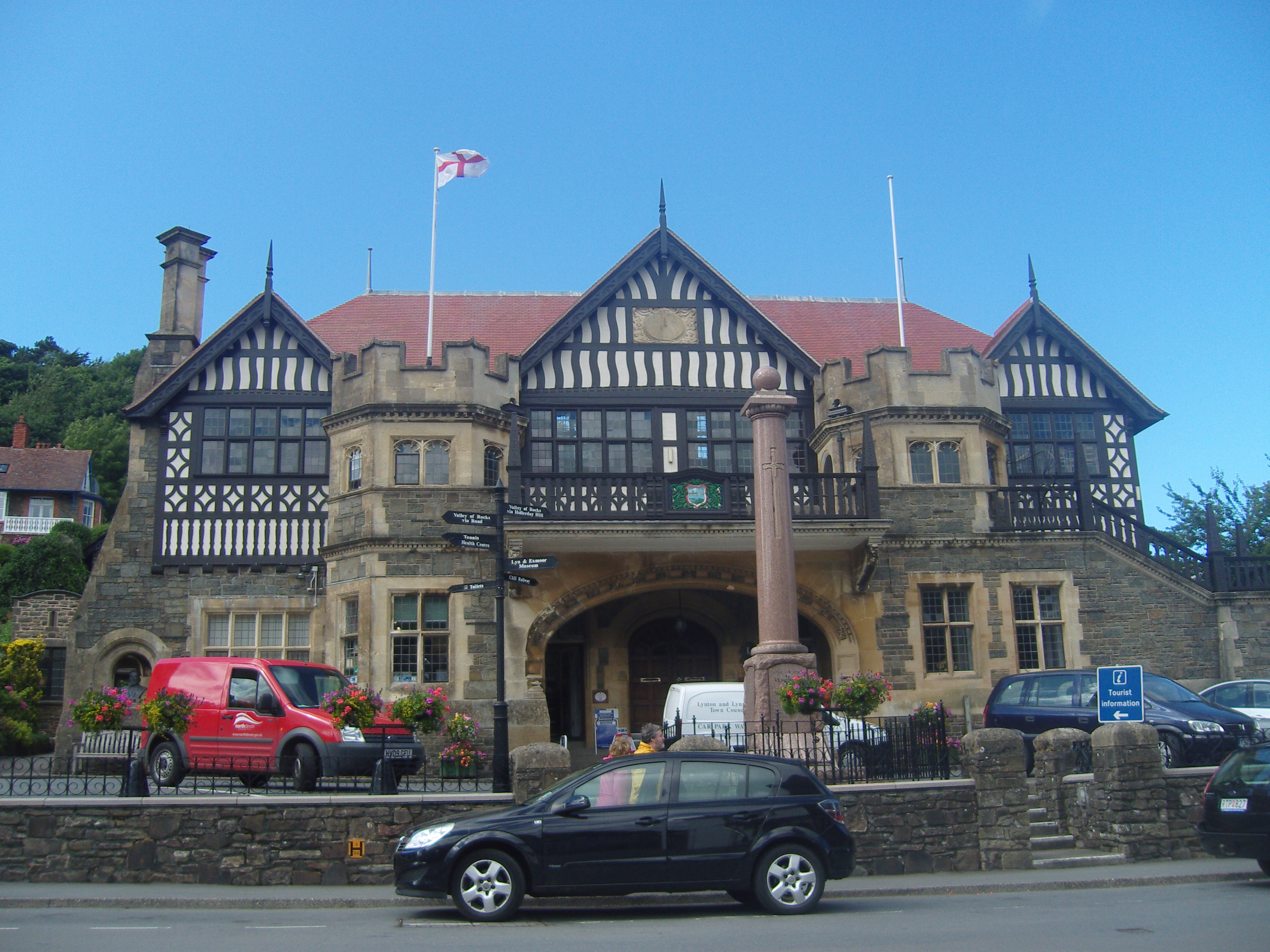
- Lynton Town Hall

- Shown in Devon
- 51.2304°N 3.8363°W
- Location: Lee Road, Lynton

History
- Built: 1900

Site notes
- Architect(s): Read and Macdonald
- Architectural style: Tudor Revival style

Listed Building – Grade II*
- Official name: Town Hall
- Designated: 3 September 1973
- Reference no.: 1206608

Lynton Town Hall is a municipal building in Lee Road, Lynton, Devon, England. The town hall, which was the meeting place of Lynton Urban District Council, is a grade II* listed building.

There is a community bookshop in one of the ground floor rooms.

== History ==
Lynton became popular as a tourist destination in the late 19th century and the area became an urban district in 1894; further development followed with the opening of the Lynton and Barnstaple Railway in 1898. In this context civic leaders decided to procure a town hall: the site selected was open ground to the west of the parish rectory. The cost of the proposed building was financed by a donation from the publisher and politician, Sir George Newnes, who owned a mansion known as Hollerday House which was located just behind the site. The leading-article writer for The Standard, T. H. S. Escott, described the donation, together with the gift Newnes had also made towards the cost of Putney Library, as "two specimens of conduct which made Newnes the most widely popular as well as prosperous newspaper runner of the new era."

The foundation stone for the new building was laid by Mrs Ada Medland Jeune on 11 May 1898. (Note: Mrs Ada Medland Jeune was the wife of Colonel Evan Browell Jeune, late of the Devon Royal Garrison Artillery.) It was designed by Read and Macdonald in the Tudor Revival style and officially opened by Newnes on 15 August 1900. The design involved a broadly symmetrical main frontage with five bays facing onto Lee Road; the central bay, which was flanked by octagonal stone turrets, featured a wide elliptical moulded archway on the ground floor with stone brackets supporting a wide wooden balcony above; there were two wide casement windows on the first floor. The central bay and the end bays were faced with decorative black timbers on the first floor and exhibited gables at roof level. Although the design is essentially Tudor Revival style, English Heritage also acknowledged elements of the Domestic Revival style and described the building in the listing details as "one of the finest Domestic Revival examples of its type in the country". Internally, the principal rooms were the council chamber on the left on the ground floor and the main hall which occupied the full width of the building on the first floor.

A bust of Newnes, designed and sculpted by Gilbert Bayes, was unveiled by the author, Arthur Conan Doyle, in the town hall in 1902. A war memorial in the form of a polished granite column intended to commemorate the lives of local service personnel who died in the First World War was unveiled outside the building in 1920. The building continued to serve as a meeting place for Lynton Urban District Council for much of the 20th century, but ceased to perform that role when the enlarged North Devon Council was formed in 1974. Instead it became the meeting place of the newly-formed Lynton Town Council.

Another bust of Newnes, designed and sculpted by Carla Haseltine, was installed in a niche on the south west corner of the building in 2000. The Princess Royal visited the town as part of the 125th anniversary celebrations for the Lynton and Lynmouth Cliff Railway; after arriving at Lynton in a cliff railway carriage, she attended a civic reception in the town hall and joined civic leaders for lunch there on 17 April 2015.

== See also ==
- Grade II* listed buildings in North Devon
