= Chambercombe Manor =

- Interactive map of the Chambercombe Manor area
- Former names: Chambercombe Manor Farm

General information
- Type: Farm house
- Architectural style: Tudor
- Location: Ilfracombe, Devon, United Kingdom
- Construction started: 15th/15th Century
- Owner: Privately owned

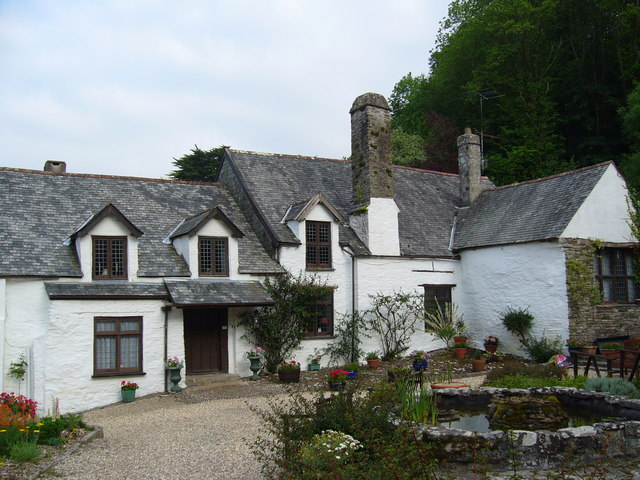

Chambercombe Manor is a Tudor farm house located near Ilfracombe, Devon, which dates back to the late 15th/early 16th century. Laid out in a classic three room and cross passage, with later additions of a cross range, probably 17th century, two further ranges, and various outbuildings for agricultural use.

Significant architectural features include a stunning example of a very large, well preserved lime ash floor in the main hall, evidence of a significantly raised (c1m) bay also within the main hall (extremely unusual, if not unique), and a small double courtyard plan (placing it among a small number of medieval and modern farm and small manor houses with this characteristic).

== History ==
Despite former claims of the manor being named in Domesday Book and dating to 11th century, this is not backed up by evidence, and a recent historic building report has concluded that the date of construction is most likely 15th/early 16th century, with various additions made over the centuries.

The earliest record found is from May 1439, when Bishop Edmund Lacy (Bishop of Exeter 1420–55) issued a licence for domestic worship at the Manor.

Whilst there is clearly a connection with the Champernon family, given the place name evidence, it is unlikely that they ever lived there, given the wide interests of the family, and their seats at Clyst St George, Modbury and Dartington. Despite no documentary evidence, they may well have owned the property at the time of its construction. Through marriage, it is thought that the Manor passed to the Herles, and then through sale to the Bonnevilles, then through marriage, to the Greys.

The earliest documented owners are the Georges, who sold the property to the Harper family in 1676. The Harper family arms are displayed in the plaster overmantel of one of the first floor bedrooms (formerly, and incorrectly, assigned in previous historical accounts, to Lady Jane Grey).

The property then passed to the Vye family in 1701, and the Gilbert family in 1883. There is then a gap in the records, until c1910 when it passed to the Stapleton/Loze/Goodman/Pincombe family, and then to the Haywards in 1972.

The farm diversified to provide accommodation and refreshments for tourists and travellers from the early 20th century, and became a more established tourist attraction, with a museum, in the mid 20th century.

With the creation of a tourist attraction, there grew over the years various stories of smugglers, wreckers, secret underground tunnels, skeletons in sealed off rooms and buried beneath floors, ships' timbers, priest's holes, royal residency, and paranormal activity. None of these stories are founded in fact; Chambercombe Manor has a perfectly good history of its own, without such embellishments, both in terms of its architecture and ownerships/tenancies. It is the most beautiful estate, set in stunning grounds.

Hayward transferred ownership to the Chambercombe Trust in 1979, remaining an active trustee until the 1990s. The Trust (registered charity number 278794). managed Chambercombe Manor and its grounds as a tourist destination until its sale in late 2023 to private owners.

In its annual return to the Charity Commission for England and Wales on 29 January 2023, the Trust announced its decision to sell the property.

In its submission to the Charity Commission for England and Wales in January 2024, the Trust reported: “Over the last few years it has become difficult to finance Chambercombe due to the construction of the building, costs of maintenance and compliance with regulations. We therefore had no option but to sell the property, which was a complex process that was completed in December 2023”.

With the completion of the sale, the manor and grounds returned to private ownership and was closed to the general public.

== Plans for 2024 and beyond ==
In January 2024, the new owners confirmed that they had started a two-year restoration programme to convert the Grade II* listed building into a private residence; a project that involves working closely with the local authority and Historic England, and with the support of a team of local architects, archaeologists, ecologists and specialist trades. As part of this, much of the property will be returned to its original configuration, with previous unsympathetic alterations removed where possible.

Throughout 2024, work will be undertaken on the extensive grounds to help return the gardens, ponds and woodland to their former glory. The new owners will undertake a study of the existing flora and fauna, and are working with a recognised woodland organisation on a strategy for long-term woodland restoration and management.

It is hoped that, following successful completion of the works, some of the existing holiday lets will become available; with the occasional use of the gardens for events open to the general public.
