= Rackenford =

Village in Devon, England

Village of Rackenford
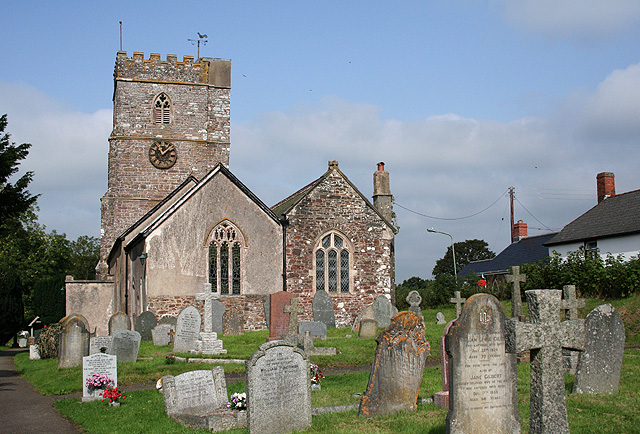
- All Saints church
- Interactive map of Village of Rackenford
- Coordinates: 50°57′06″N 3°38′12″W
- Sovereign state: United Kingdom
- Constituent country: England
- Region: South West England
- Ceremonial county: Devon
- Time zone: UTC0 (GMT)
  - Summer (DST): UTC+1 (BST)
- Postcode district: EX16

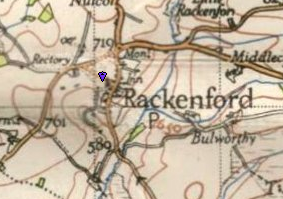
Rackenford shown on an old map.

Rackenford is a village and civil parish in North Devon, England. It is roughly located 7.31 miles North West of Tiverton and 20 miles South East of Barnstaple.

== Points Of Interest ==
=== All Saints Church ===
The village church, situated in the middle of the village, previously named Holy Trinity.

=== Rackenford Club ===
A private members club located just outside Rackenford on the "Old Rackenford Road"

=== The Stag Inn ===
A pub located in the centre of the village opposite the church. It is rumoured to be one of the oldest pubs in Devon and to contain beams from the Mary Rose. The Stag Inn has been renovated and reopened in 2018. Since Covid, it is open for a traditional family Sunday Lunch and special events only.

=== Nature reserve ===
Rackenford and Knowstone Moors, a nature reserve of Devon Wildlife Trust, is near the village.

== Population Figures ==
Population Figures
Year	1801	1851	1901	1931	1961	1971	1981	1991	2001	2005	2011	2021
Population	340	473	302	317	291	282	311	329	335	407	330	417
