= Romansleigh =

Village in Devon, England

Coordinates: 50.970360°N 3.8131893°W

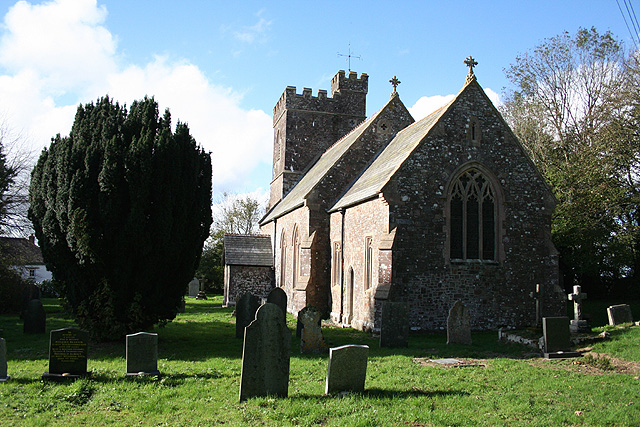
- St Rumon's church

- Location within Devon
- Population: 98 (2001 census)
- Civil parish: Romansleigh
- District: North Devon
- Shire county: Devon
- Region: South West
- Country: England
- Sovereign state: United Kingdom

Romansleigh is a village and civil parish in the North Devon district of Devon, England. It is surrounded clockwise from the north by the parishes of Mariansleigh, Meshaw, Chulmleigh, and King's Nympton. In 2001 its population was 98, compared with 155 in 1901. The parish church, dedicated to Saint Rumon, was completely rebuilt in 1868.
