= Marwood, Devon =

Village in Devon, England

Marwood
- Village
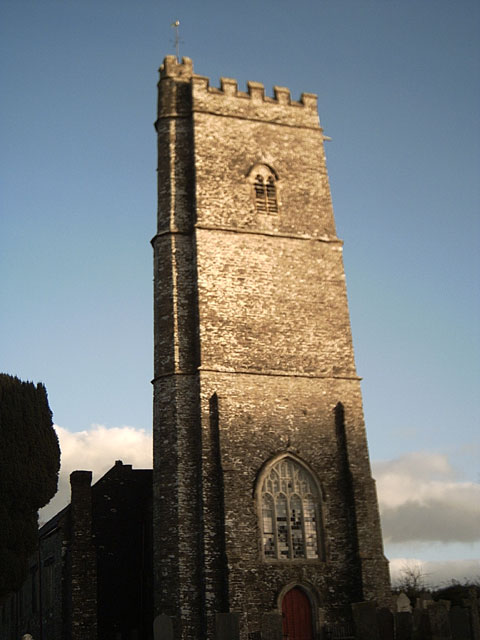
- St Michael and All Angels Church, Marwood

- Location within Devon Location within the United Kingdom
- Coordinates: 51°07′N 4°05′W
- Country: England
- County: Devon
- District: North Devon
- Time zone: UTC+0:00 (GST)

Marwood is a village and civil parish in North Devon, England, about 3.5 miles (5.6 km) north of Barnstaple. Hamlets in the parish include Patsford, Middle Marwood, Whiddon, Milltown, Muddiford, Guineaford, Kingsheanton, Prixford, and the southern part of Bittadon.

An electoral ward with the same name exists whose population at the 2011 census was 1,879.

The church of St Michael and All Angels at Marwood was begun in the 13th century and is a Grade I listed building.

The village contains 20 acres (81,000 m^{2}) of ornamental gardens open to the public, known as Marwood Hill Gardens. The gardens were developed by Jimmy Smart, who died in 2002. On an island in the middle lake at Marwood Hill Gardens is a sculpture of a mother and children by John Robinson, who also sculpted the font-cover in the 13th-century church at Marwood. A bronze sculpture of two swans arising from the lower lake was created by Jonathan Cox.
