= Kentisbury =

Village in Devon, England

- Parish
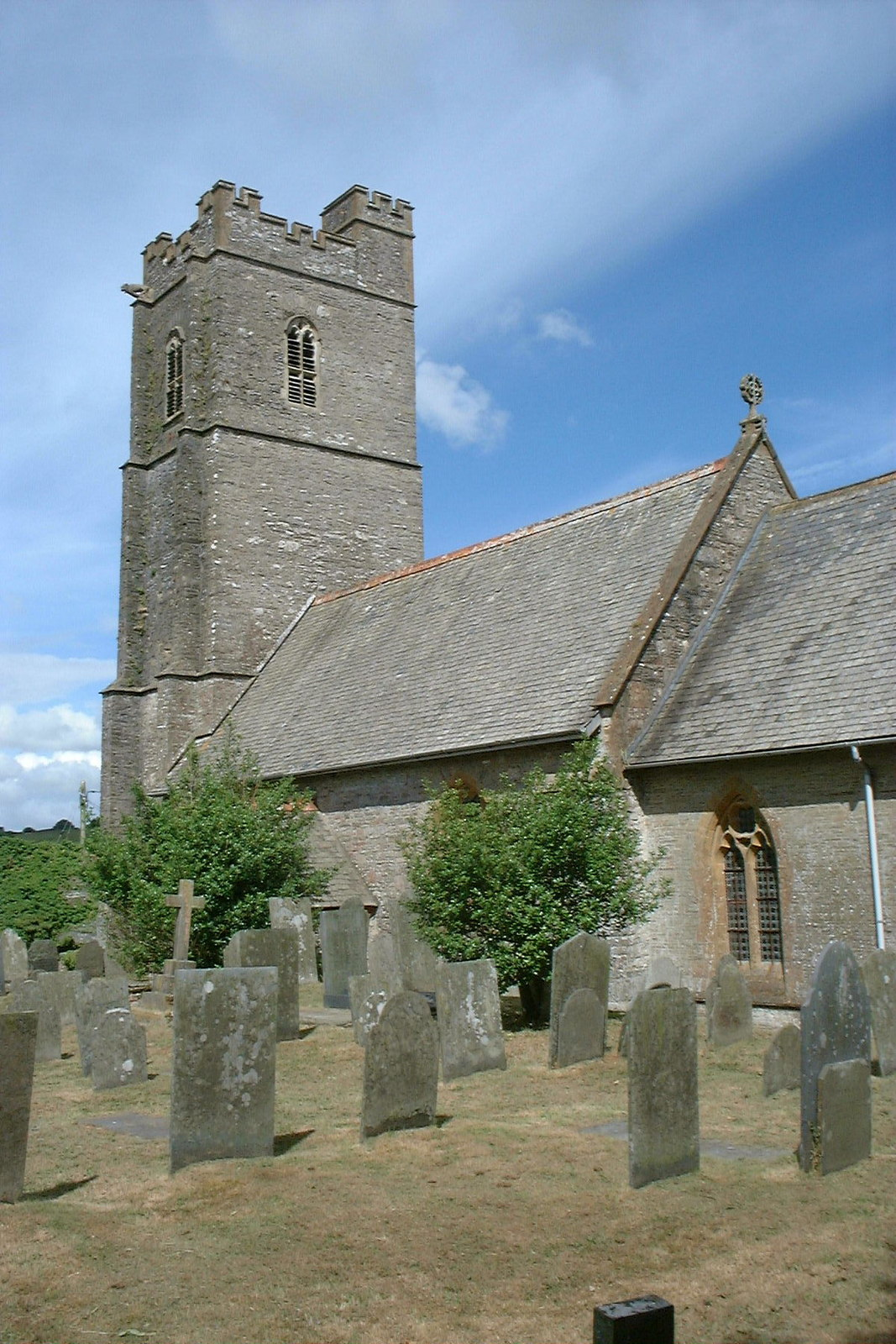
- St Thomas church

- Location within Devon Location within the United Kingdom
- Coordinates: 51°11′N 3°59′W
- Country: England
- County: Devon
- District: North Devon

Population (2011)
  - Total: 299
- Time zone: UTC+0:00 (GST)

Kentisbury is a rural civil parish in North Devon, England, bordering the Exmoor National Park, consisting of three small hamlets, Patchole, Kentisbury Ford and Kentisbury, approximately 10 miles (16 km) north east of Barnstaple. The population at the 2001 census was 266 people, increasing to 299 at the 2011 census.

== Parish Church ==
The Church of England parish Church of Saint Thomas is part of the benefice of Shirwell.

== Early history ==
There is evidence of an Iron Age enclosure on Kentisbury Down. Kentisbury is mentioned in the Domesday Book, shown as Chentesberia.

== Local amenities ==
The nearest public house is the Old Station House Inn, which, as its name suggests, was opened in the Station House of the former Lynton & Barnstaple Railway following its closure in 1935. A project is in existence to re-open the railway as a tourist attraction.

A school has existed in the village since 1876, with the existing primary school building dating from 1929.
