= Trentishoe =

Village in Devon, England

Coordinates: 51°13′N 3°57′W

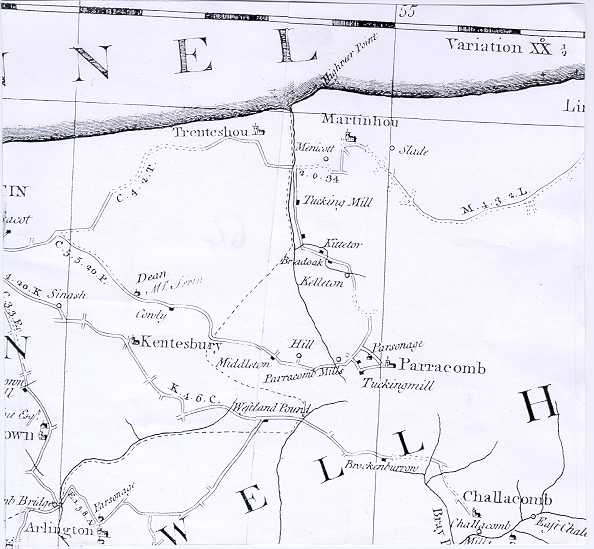
The Trentishoe area on Donn's one inch to the mile survey of 1765.

Trentishoe is a village and civil parish in North Devon, England. The parish lies on the coast of the Bristol Channel. The village is 5 miles (8 km) east of Combe Martin, at an elevation of 180 metres, separated from the coast by high cliffs.

The village was mentioned in the Domesday Book as Trendesholt. The name is of Old English origin, and appears to mean "hill-spur of a circular hill named Trendel".

== Parish church ==
The small parish church is dedicated to St Peter. The church dates from the 15th century, and is a Grade II* listed building.

It is in the Shirwell deanery of the Church of England. James Hannington, a future saint and a martyr, took charge of the parish church in 1873.

== Trentishoe free festivals ==
In 1973 a small ecologically-themed free rock festival was held on a clifftop site near Trentishoe, titled the Trentishoe Whole Earth Fayre (possibly following a minuscule 1972 festival of which records are sparse). The 'International Times', in 1973, noted "The Trentishoe bash, kicking off on July 9th and running for a couple of weeks, looks like kindling a similar flame to that ignited by the Glastonbury Fayre". The organisers of the 1973 event were Greg Haynes, Mike Tanner, Dave Mackay and Norman with music arranged by Greasy Truckers and Bath Arts Workshop. Bands included Hawkwind, Pink Fairies and Magic Muscle. A follow-up event took place in 1975, and another under the same name but at a different location in 1976.
