= Stoke Rivers =

Village in Devon, England

Coordinates: 51.10202°N 3.95311°W

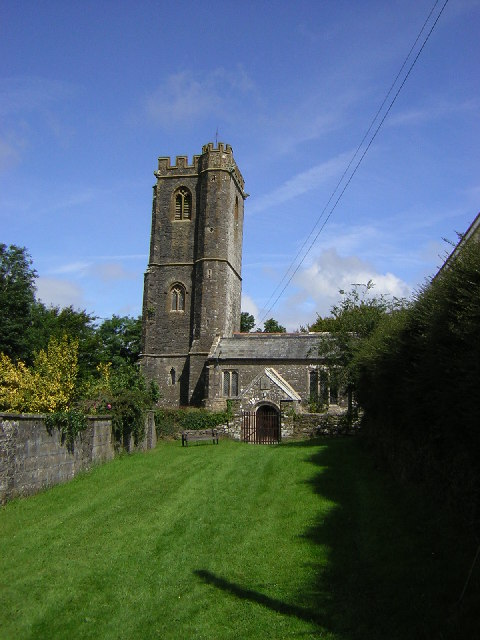
St Bartholomew's Church, Stoke Rivers

Stoke Rivers is a small village five miles north-east of Barnstaple, in Devon, England. The village historically formed part of Shirwell Hundred and for ecclesiastical purposes falls within the Shirwell Deanery. The parish of Stoke Rivers comprises the village itself as well as several scattered farmsteads. There is also the medieval parish church of St. Batholomew and a small Baptist church.

The name derives from the Rivers family, who owned the village.

The village is located at grid reference SS6335035450
