= George Nympton =

Village in Devon, England

Coordinates: 50.9919°N 3.8528°W

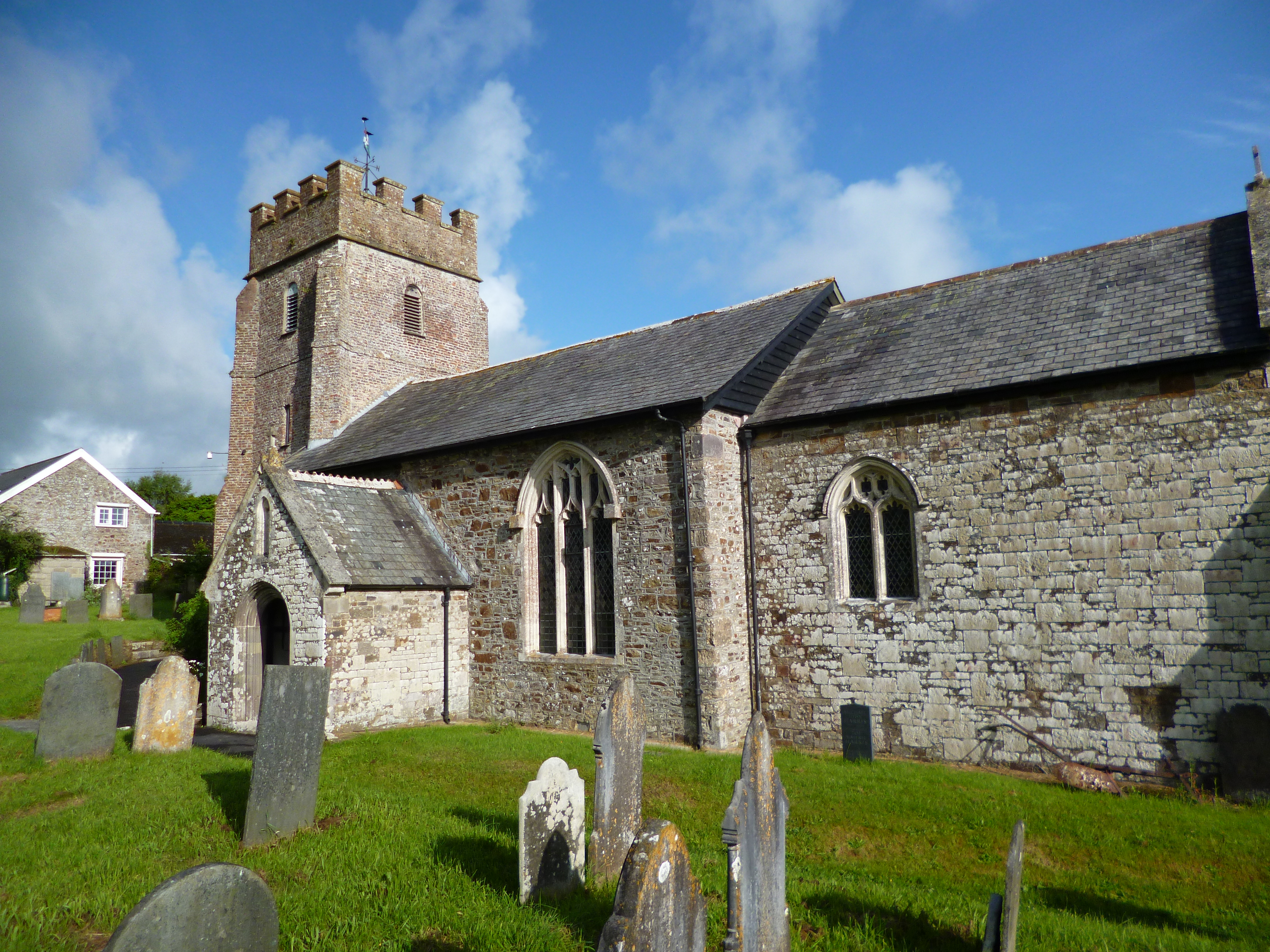
- St George's church, George Nympton

- Location within Devon
- Population: 175 (2011 census)
- Civil parish: George Nympton
- District: North Devon
- Shire county: Devon
- Region: South West
- Country: England
- Sovereign state: United Kingdom

George Nympton or Nymet St George is a small village and civil parish in North Devon district, Devon, England. In the 2011 census it was recorded as having a population of 175.

From northwards clockwise the neighbouring parishes are South Molton, Bishop's Nympton, Queen's Nympton, and King's Nympton.

George Nympton has a parish council.

There are 16 listed buildings in the parish, all at Grade II except the church which is Grade II*. They include the village hall, some tombs in the churchyard, and various houses.

The parish church of St George is part of the South Molton Mission Community within the Diocese of Exeter.
