= Burrington, Devon =

Village in Devon, England

Coordinates: 50.933889°N 3.939444°W

Burrington
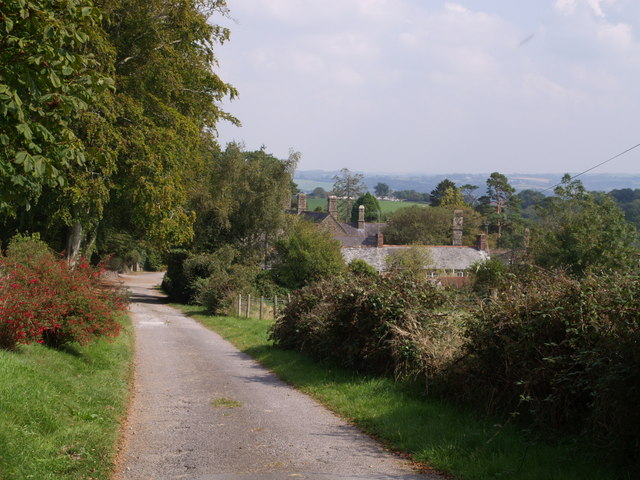
- Northcote Manor Hotel

- Location within Devon
- Population: 538 (2001)
- OS grid reference: SS6316
- Civil parish: Burrington
- District: North Devon
- Shire county: Devon
- Region: South West
- Country: England
- Sovereign state: United Kingdom
- Post town: UMBERLEIGH
- Postcode district: EX37
- Dialling code: 01769
- Police: Devon and Cornwall
- Fire: Devon and Somerset
- Ambulance: South Western
- UK Parliament: North Devon

Burrington is a village and civil parish in North Devon in England. In 2001 the population was 538.

The village has a church, a Methodist chapel, a pub and shop-cum-Post Office. Unusually for a Devon village it has excellent bus services between Barnstaple and Exeter. The church, Holy Trinity, is Grade I listed and the pub, the Barnstaple Inn, is Grade II listed. The pub is one of only two buildings within the village that are still thatched.

The parish church of Holy Trinity dates from the 16th century, but it is of old foundation and its incumbents are recorded from 1277. It has a notable granite arcade, wagon roof with carved bosses, an early 16th-century rood screen and a Norman font. The tower is in the position of a north transept. The south door is original and has blank Perpendicular tracery; the communion rails are c. 1700. Northcote Manor, dating from at least the 1700s is located within the parish.

The parish records include the baptisms of the three children of William and Ann Blackmore (of Town) during the 1820s. William is described as the schoolteacher. One of the vicars of Burrington was Samuel Davis, the second of whose wives was Jane Elizabeth Blackmore, half-sister of Richard Doddridge Blackmore, the author of Lorna Doone.
