= Twitchen, Devon =

Village and civil parish in North Devon, England

Coordinates: 51°04′N 3°44′W

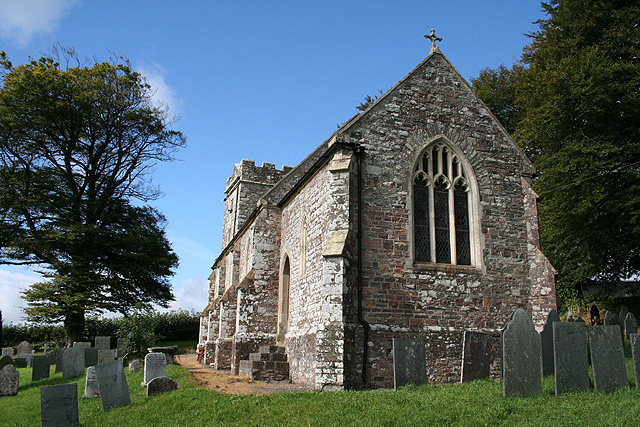
St Peter's church

Twitchen is a village and civil parish in Devon, England, located within the North Devon local authority area. Historically it formed part of South Molton Hundred. The population was 145 in 1801; 163 in 1901 and 70 in 2001. Twitchen is recorded in the Domesday Book as being part of the manor of Alvred D'Epaignes having been held by freely by Beorhtweald in the time of King Edward, before the Norman Conquest in 1066.
