= East Worlington =

Hamlet in Devon, England

Coordinates: 50°55′N 3°45′W

- Civil parish in England
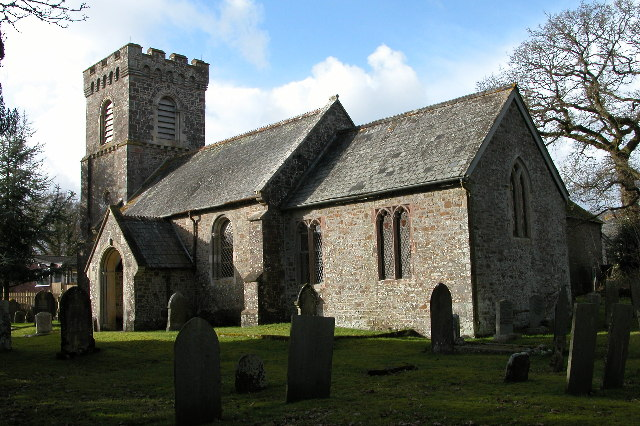
- East Worlington Church

- Location within Devon
- Area: 218,713 km^{2} (84,446 sq mi)
- Population: 220
  - Density: 0/km^{2} (0/sq mi)
- OS grid reference: SS7713
- District: North Devon
- Shire county: Devon
- Region: South West
- Country: England
- Sovereign state: United Kingdom
- Police: Devon and Cornwall
- Fire: Devon and Somerset
- Ambulance: South Western

East Worlington is a civil parish and hamlet in the North Devon administrative area, in the English county of Devon, England.

In 2001, the village had 241 inhabitants, 173 in 1901 and 194 in 1801. The civil parish also includes the smaller West Worlington. Both settlements have a "St.Mary's Church".

The Domesday Book of 1086 states that East and West Worlington together had 26 households.
