= Holy Trinity Church, Barnstaple =

Church in Devon, England

Coordinates: 51°04′34″N 4°03′14″W

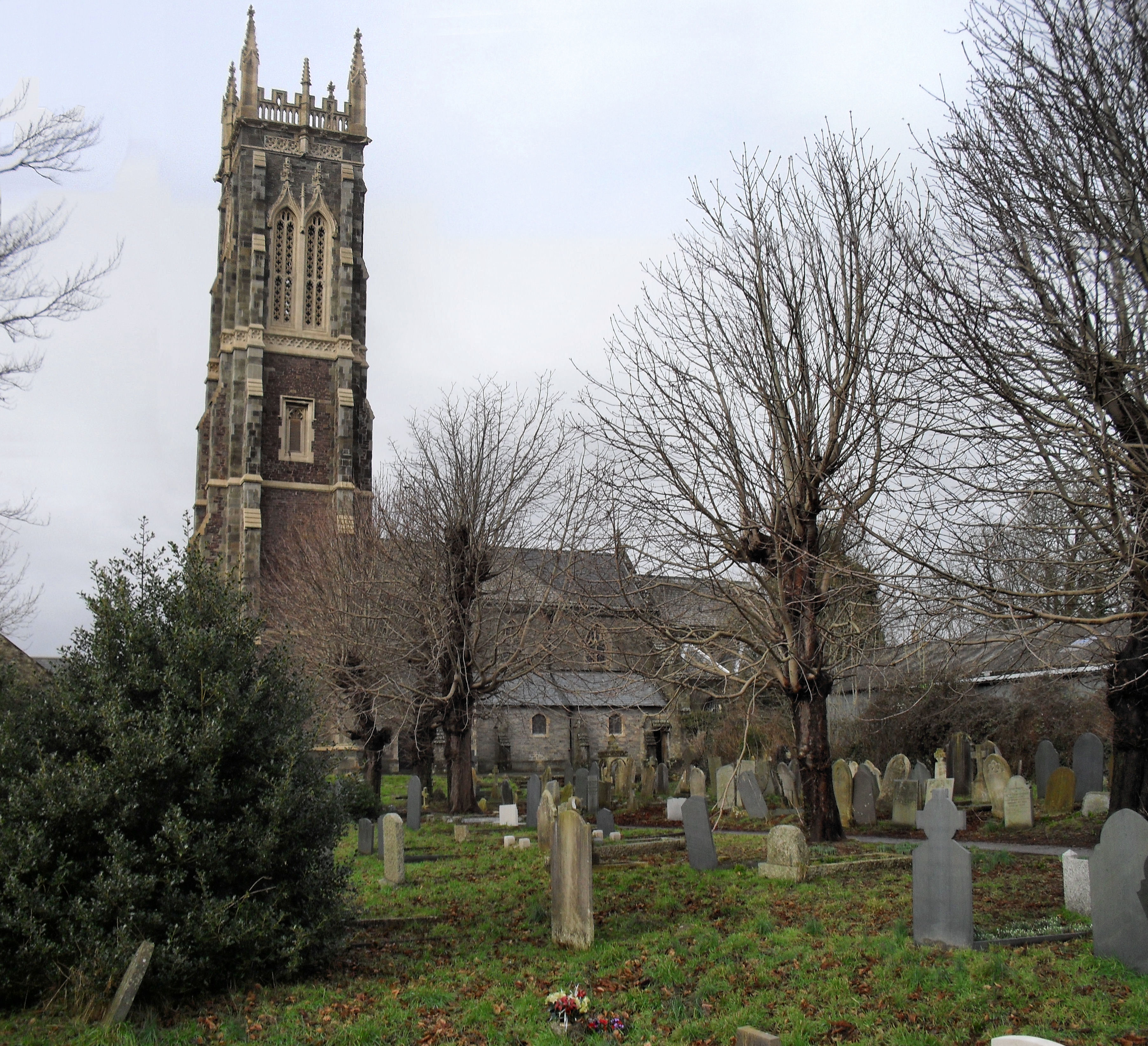
Holy Trinity Church in Barnstaple in Devon

Holy Trinity is an Anglican parish church for Barnstaple in Devon. Dating from 1867 with an earlier tower from 1843 to 1845, the church comes under the Diocese of Exeter and has been a Grade II* listed building since 1981.

== History and design ==
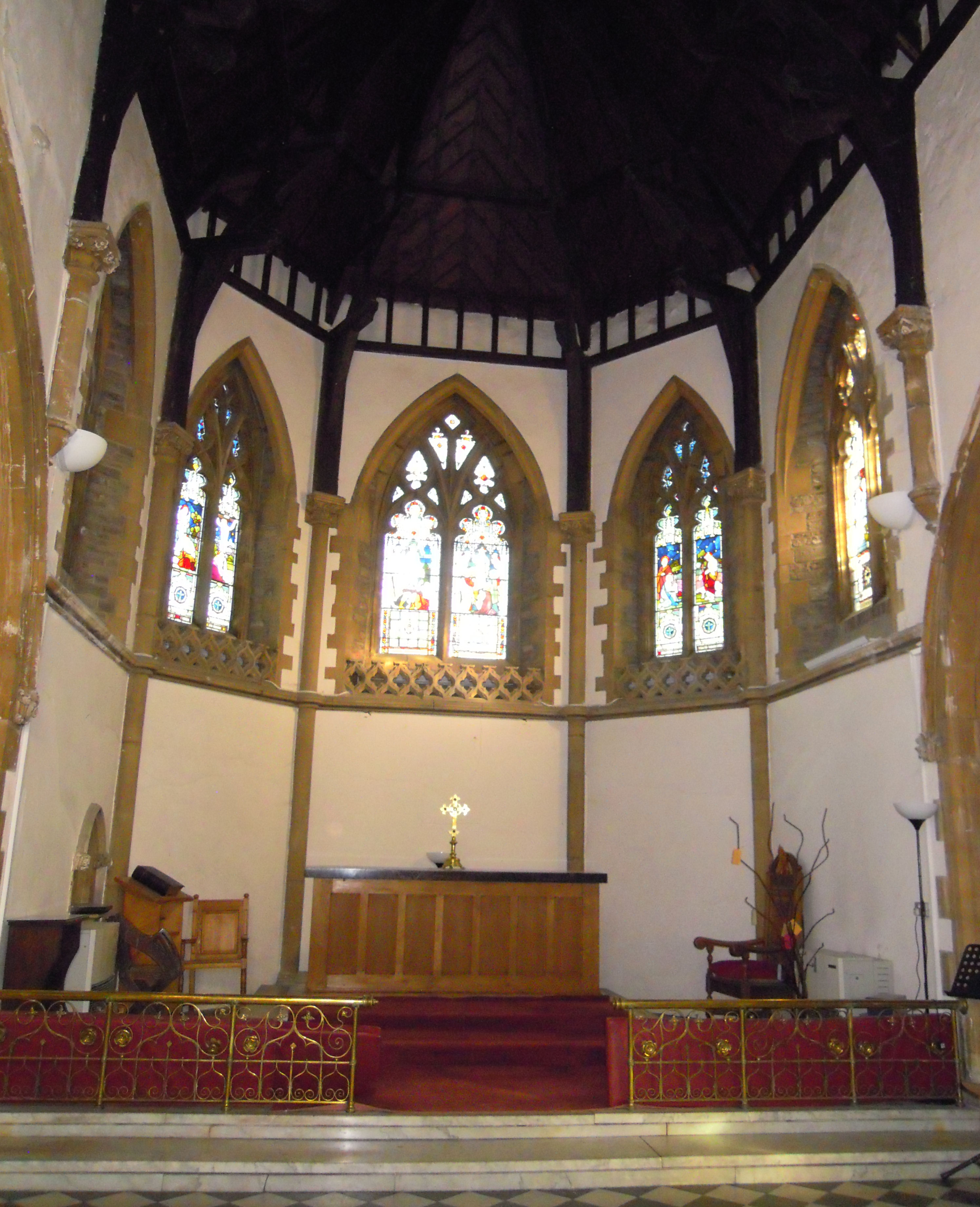
The Sanctuary

Holy Trinity is a typical Victorian era church built in 1867 by William White on the site of an earlier church designed in the 1840s by David Mackintosh of Exeter but which necessarily had to be rebuilt as its foundations were unsound. The four-stage tower with set-back buttresses is built in the Somerset style and pre-dates the main body of the present church having been constructed between 1843 and 1845 as part of the earlier church; at 38 metres high the tower is the main reason for the Grade II* listing and is a landmark around Barnstaple and surrounding areas. The tower has an embattled and pierced parapet with corner pinnacles with crockets and lower, central pinnacles to each face and is constructed of rubble with tooled ashlar dressings. The rest of the church is built with snecked stone with ashlar and Bath stone dressings with good carved friezes on the exterior of the nave and tower while the roof is slate. The iron railings and gates at the west end of the tower with an unpierced cast-iron frieze of foliage design also form part of the listing status.

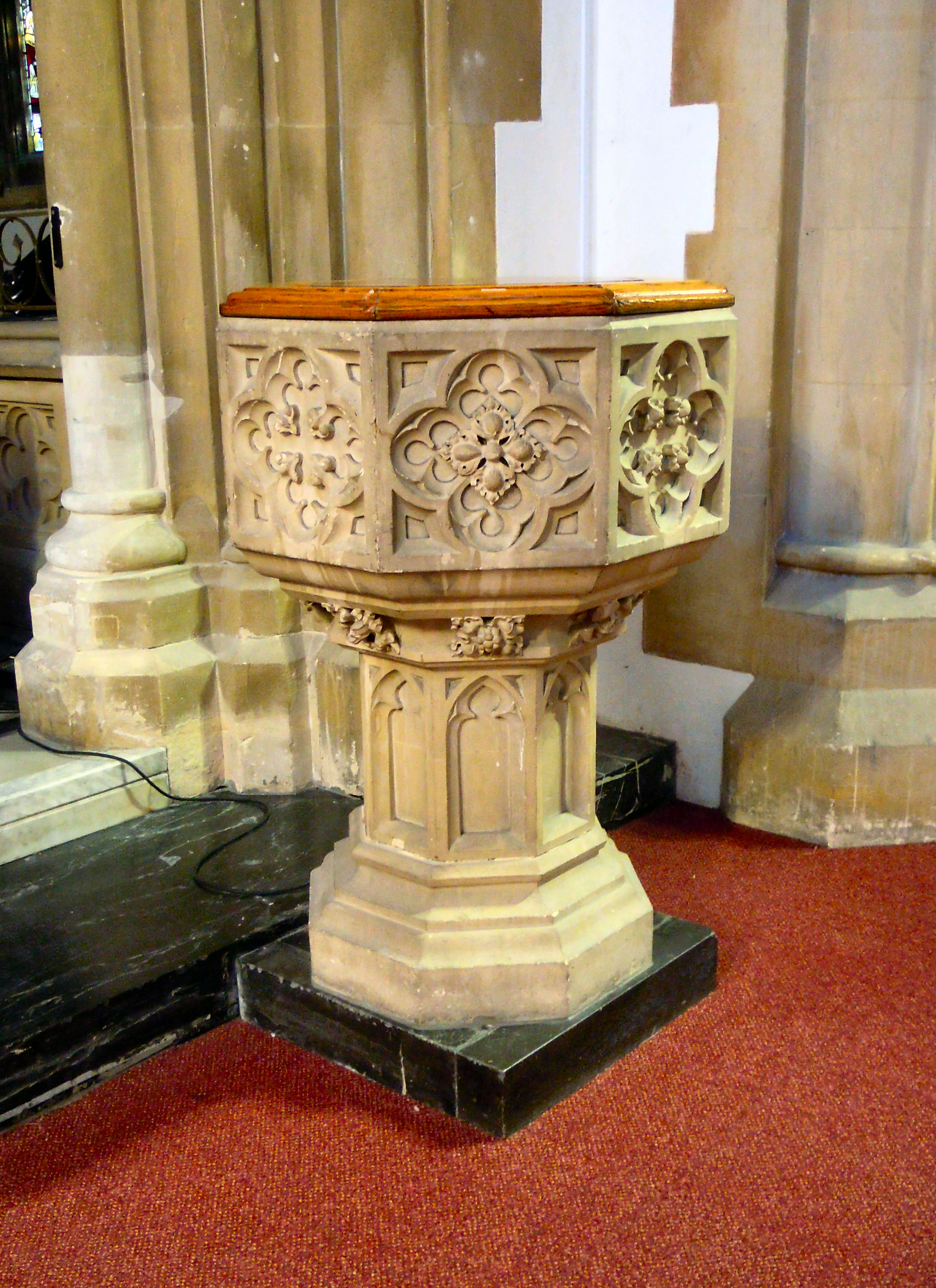
The baptismal font

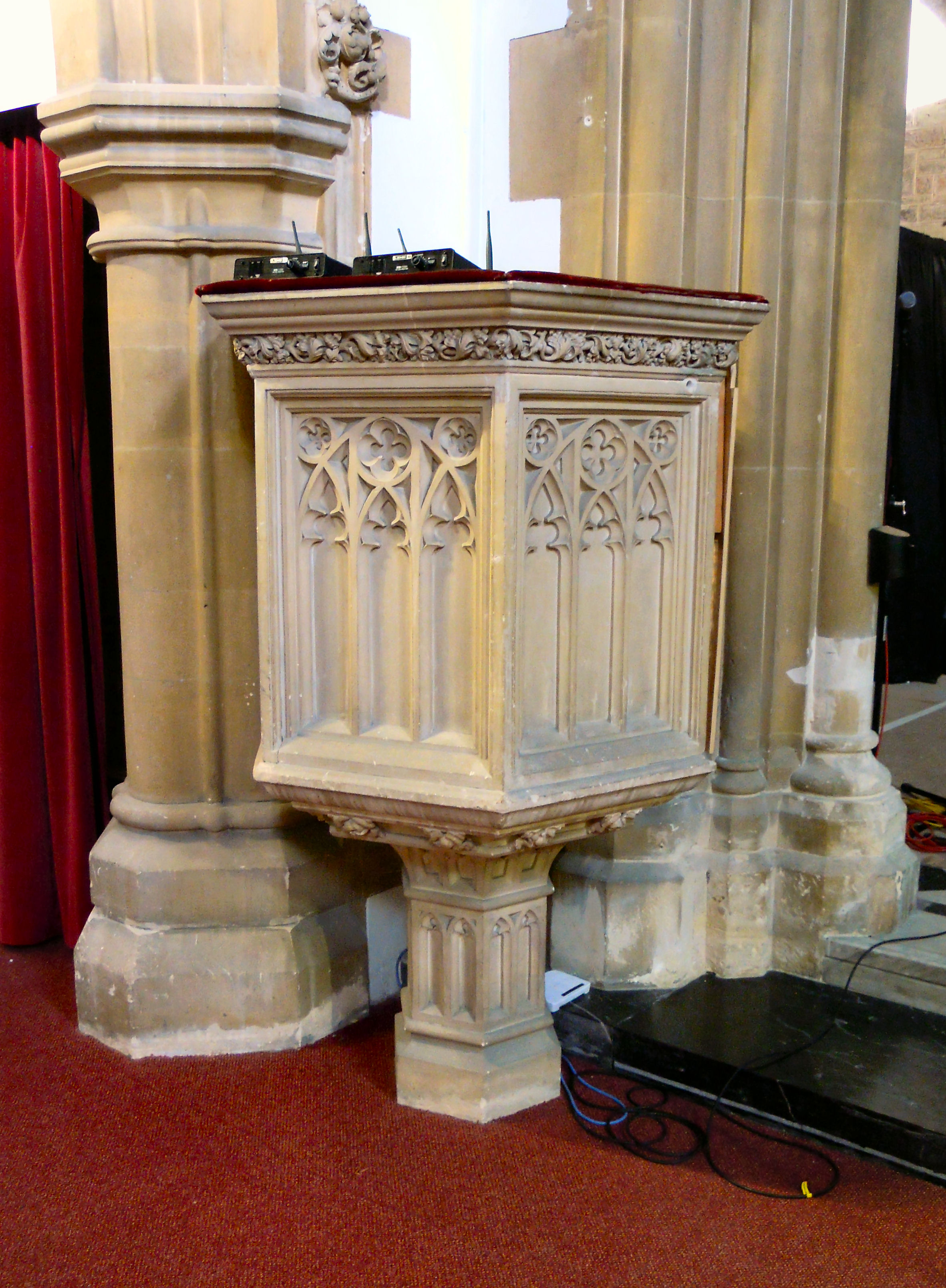
The Victorian pulpit

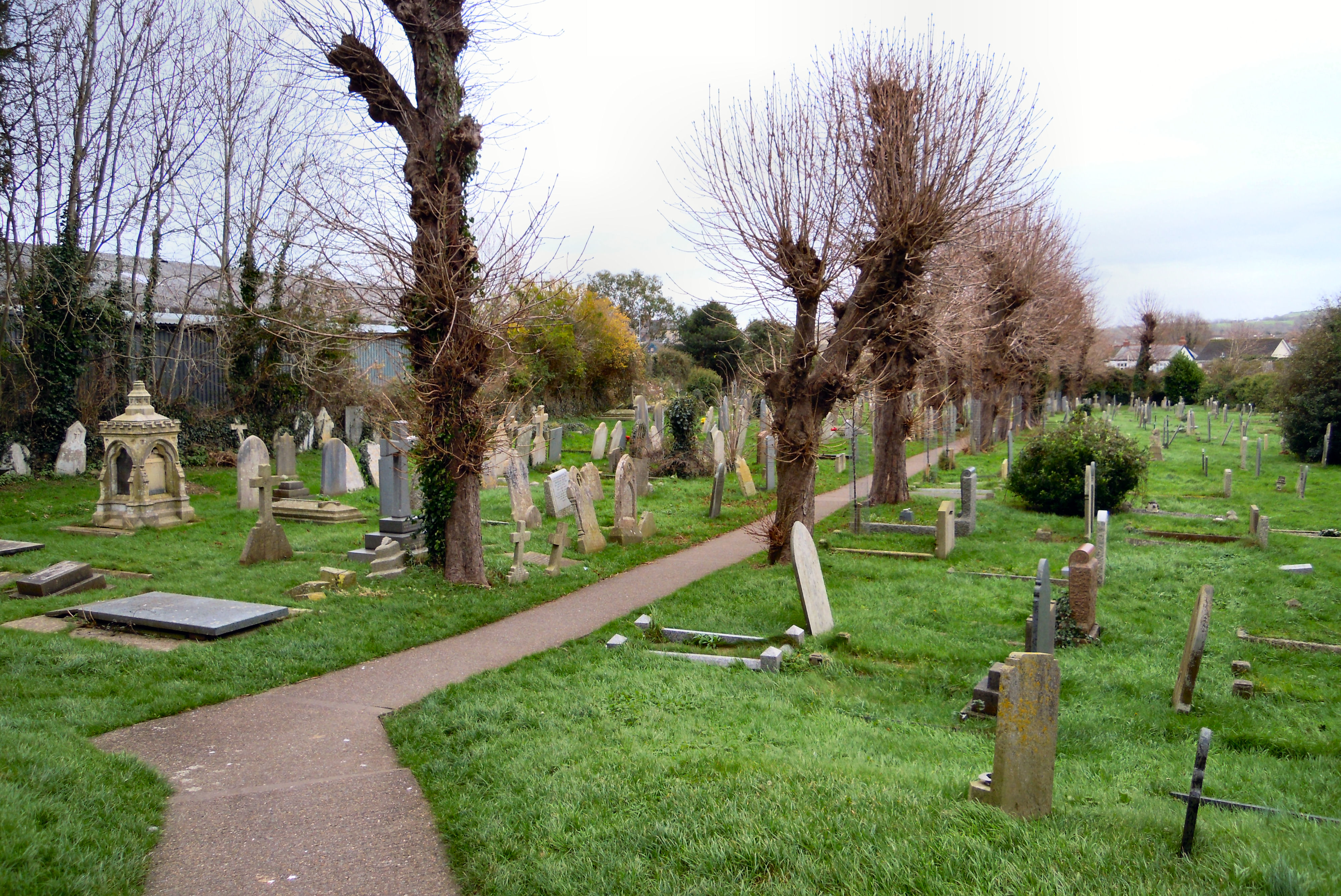
The churchyard

The church is built in a free Gothic style influenced by medieval Perpendicular with French Gothic influences to the East end while the interior is a four-bay nave and aisles with a chancel with pairs of projecting bays on its North and South sides. On the south wall to the right of the west door is a memorial to the dead of the parish killed during World War I.

The churchyard holds 5 burials from World War I and 4 from World War II which are maintained by the Commonwealth War Graves Commission (CWGC).

== Reordering ==
The church was reordered in 2009 together with repairs to the tower at a cost of £400,000 and an indoor climbing wall installed in the base of the tower in 2010 at a cost of £12,000. The church reordering was in the nave and included a new carpeted floor with underfloor heating, an altered vestibule with disabled toilet, the removal of the pews and the installation of a small kitchen. In 2018 the congregation averaged 150 people with some young families.
