= Satterleigh and Warkleigh =

Civil parish in Devon, England

Coordinates: 50.9853°N 3.9124°W

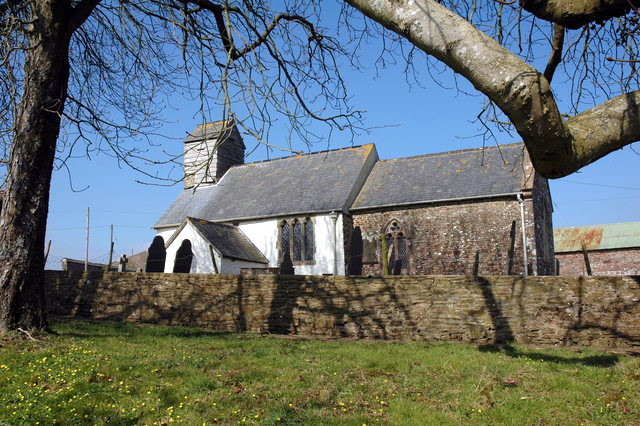
- St Peter's Church, Satterleigh

- Location within Devon
- Population: 170
- Unitary authority: North Devon
- Ceremonial county: Devon
- Region: South West
- Country: England
- Sovereign state: United Kingdom
- Police: Devon and Cornwall
- Fire: Devon and Somerset
- Ambulance: South Western
- Website: cswparish.org.uk

Satterleigh and Warkleigh is a civil parish in North Devon district, Devon, England. In the 2011 census it was recorded as having a population of 170.

== History ==
The parish was created in 1894, combining the two previous parishes of the same names.

Several locational surnames were derived from Satterleigh. Some of those include Saturley, Saturleigh, Saterleigh, Saterleye, Satterlie, Satterlee, Satterleigh, Satterley, and Satterly.

== Governance ==
A combined parish council serves Satterleigh and Warkleigh and the neighbouring parish as the Chittlehamholt, Satterleigh and Warkleigh Parish Council.

== Geography ==
The neighbouring parishes are Chittlehampton to the north, King's Nympton to the east, Chittlehamholt to the south, and High Bickington in Torridge district to the west.

== Landmarks ==
St Peter's Church, Satterleigh is a Grade I listed redundant church in the care of the Churches Conservation Trust. St John the Evangelist Church, Warkleigh is Grade II* listed. Both churches are part of the South Molton Mission, in the Diocese of Exeter.

There are 35 listed buildings in the parish, all at Grade II except the two churches.
