= East Anstey =

Village in Devon, England

Coordinates: 51°01′N 3°37′W

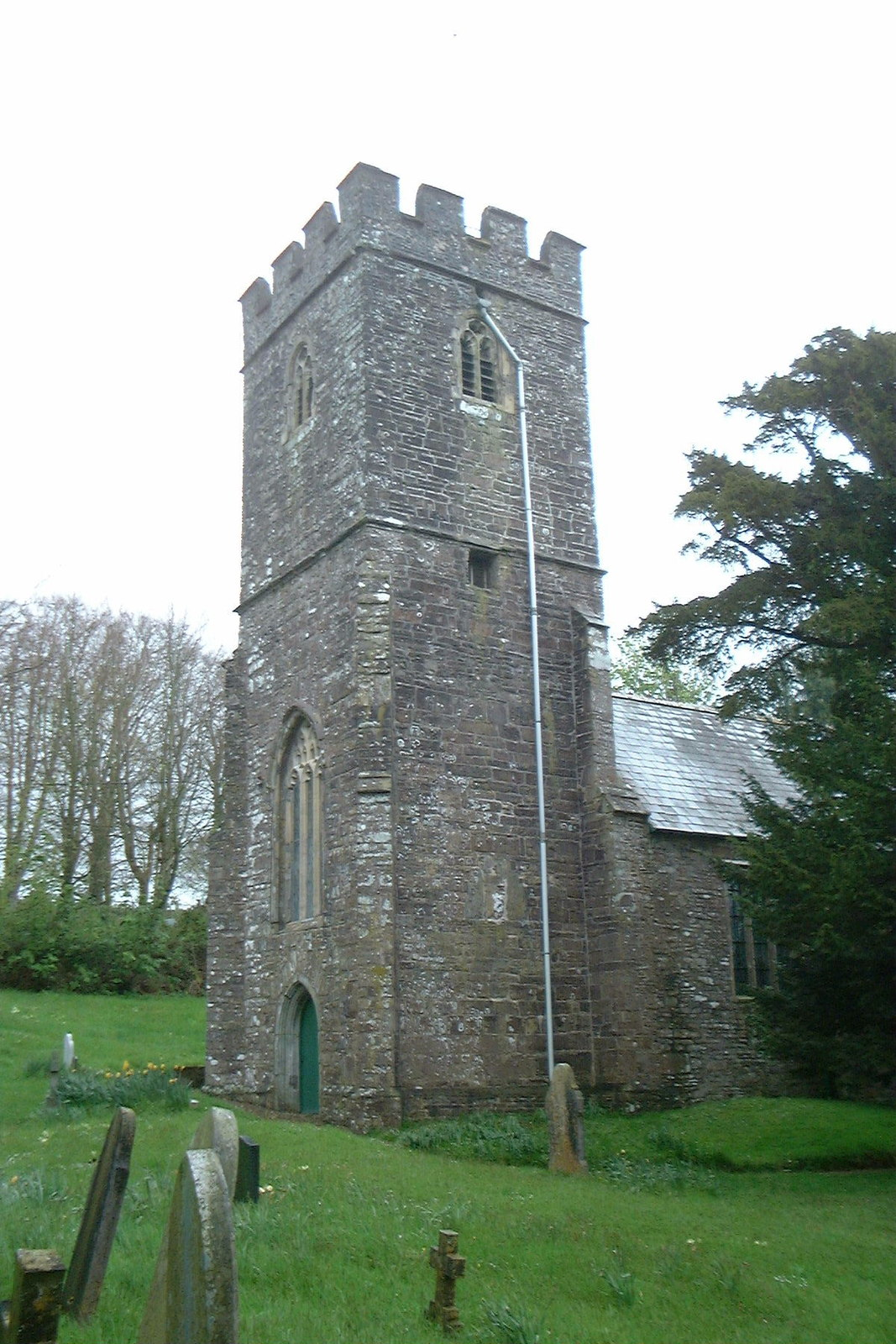
St Michael's Church, East Anstey

East Anstey is a village and civil parish in the North Devon district of Devon, England. The parish is located in an area which has been designated as an area of 'Great Landscape Value'. The village falls within the South Molton Deanery for ecclesiastical purposes. The village has a Grade II listed church, the Church of St Michael, which has a 15th-century tower and south porch but which was largely rebuilt in 1871.

The name 'Anstey' is derived from the Old English word ‘an-stiga’ meaning ‘a hill pathway for one’. East Anstey had a station on the old GWR Taunton - Barnstaple Victoria Road which closed in 1966. The station is now a private residence.

== Notable residents ==
- Rev John Froude II (1777-1852), Vicar of Molland-cum-Knowstone, an extreme example of the "hunting parson".
