= Mariansleigh =

Village in Devon, England

Coordinates: 50°59′N 3°47′W

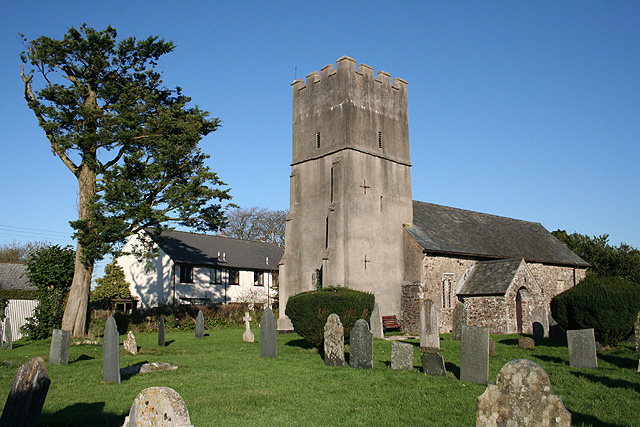
- St Mary's church

- Location within Devon
- Population: 170 (2021 census)
- Civil parish: Mariansleigh
- District: North Devon
- Shire county: Devon
- Region: South West
- Country: England
- Sovereign state: United Kingdom

Mariansleigh is a hamlet and civil parish in Devon, England, with a population of 170 in 2021.
