= Samuel Rolle =

Samuel Rolle may refer to:

- Samuel Rolle (died 1647), English MP for Grampound, Callington and Devon
- Samuel Rolle (1646–1719), English MP for Callington and Devon (UK Parliament constituency)
- Samuel Rolle (1669–1735), English MP for Barnstaple
