= Chittlehampton =

Village in Devon, England

Coordinates: 51.013°N 3.946°W

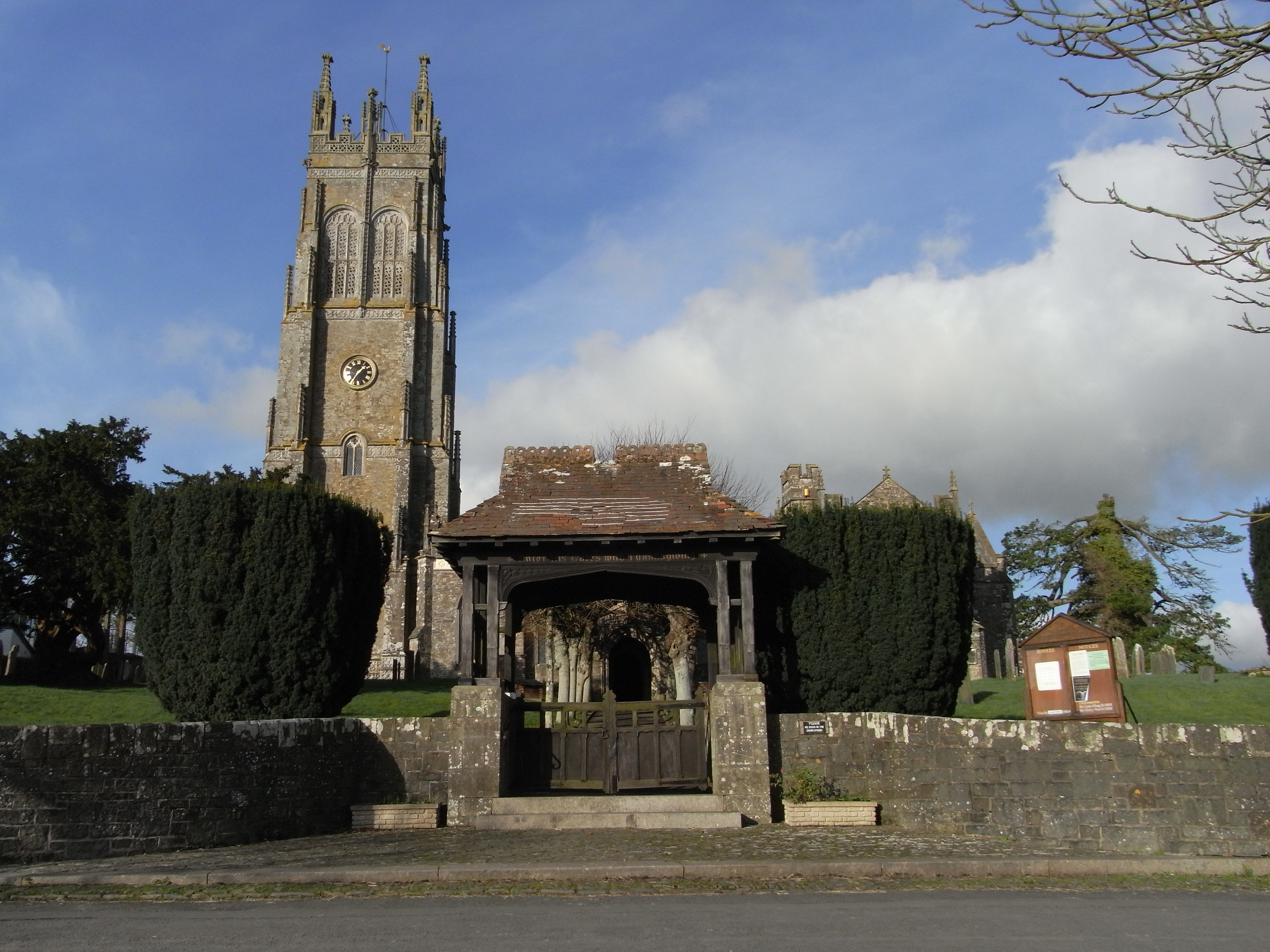
- St Hieritha's Church and lychgate

- Location within Devon
- Population: 820 (2001)
- OS grid reference: SS636255
- Civil parish: Chittlehampton
- District: North Devon
- Shire county: Devon
- Region: South West
- Country: England
- Sovereign state: United Kingdom
- Post town: UMBERLEIGH
- Postcode district: EX37
- Dialling code: 01769
- Police: Devon and Cornwall
- Fire: Devon and Somerset
- Ambulance: South Western
- UK Parliament: North Devon
- Website: Parish Council

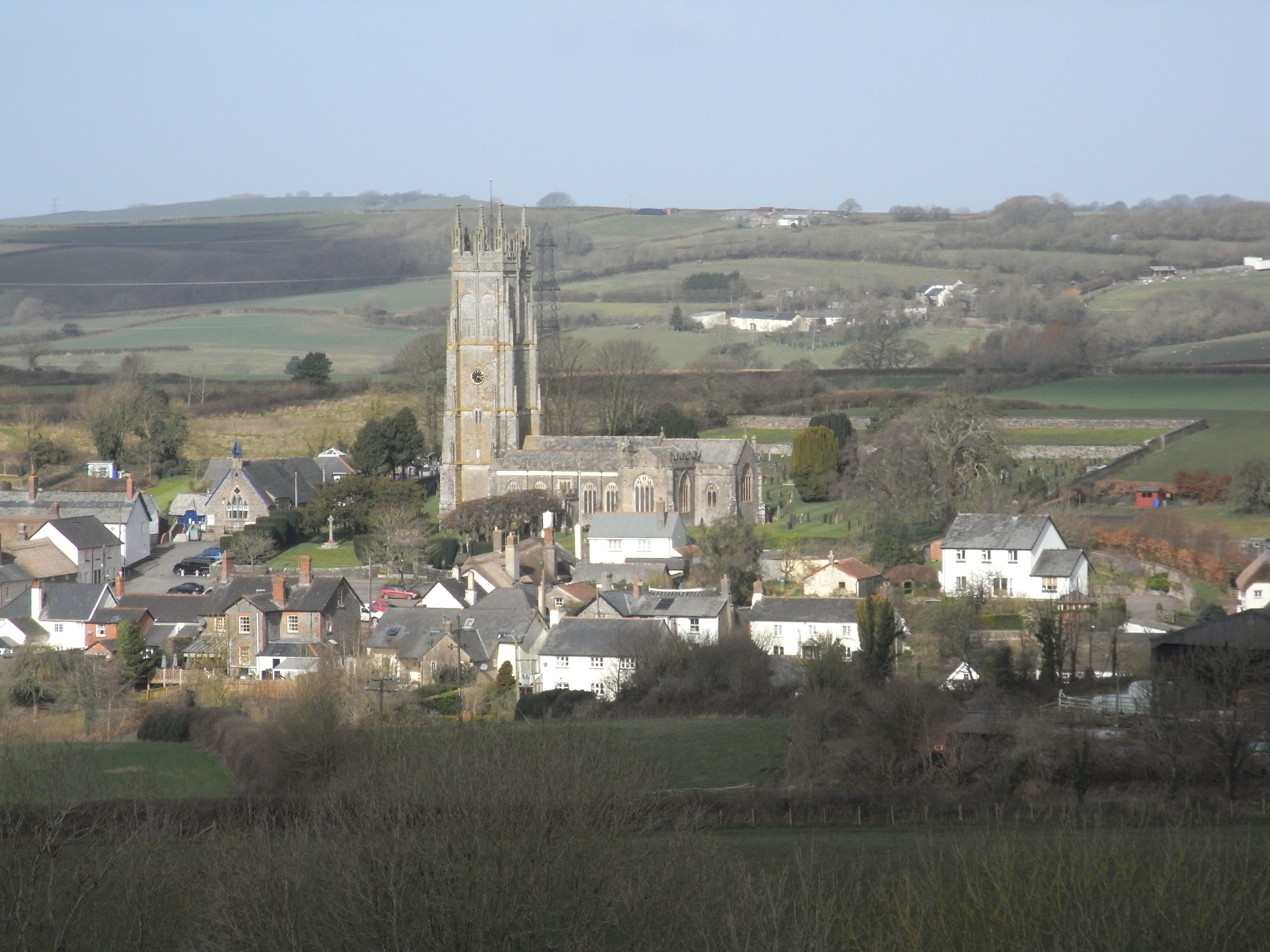
Chittlehampton viewed from the south

Chittlehampton is a village and civil parish in the North Devon district of Devon, England, about 7 miles (11 km) south-west of Barnstaple. At the 2001 census, the parish had a population of 820.

The parish originally had two exclaves; Chittlehamholt to the south (now a parish in itself), and part of the modern parish of East and West Buckland. It now includes Chittlehampton, Umberleigh, Furze, Stowford and some other outlying hamlets. The parish is surrounded clockwise from the north by the parishes of Swimbridge, Filleigh, South Molton, Satterleigh and Warkleigh, High Bickington, Atherington, and Bishop's Tawton.

The village was the site of limestone quarries which supplied many of the county's lime kilns.

== Parish church ==
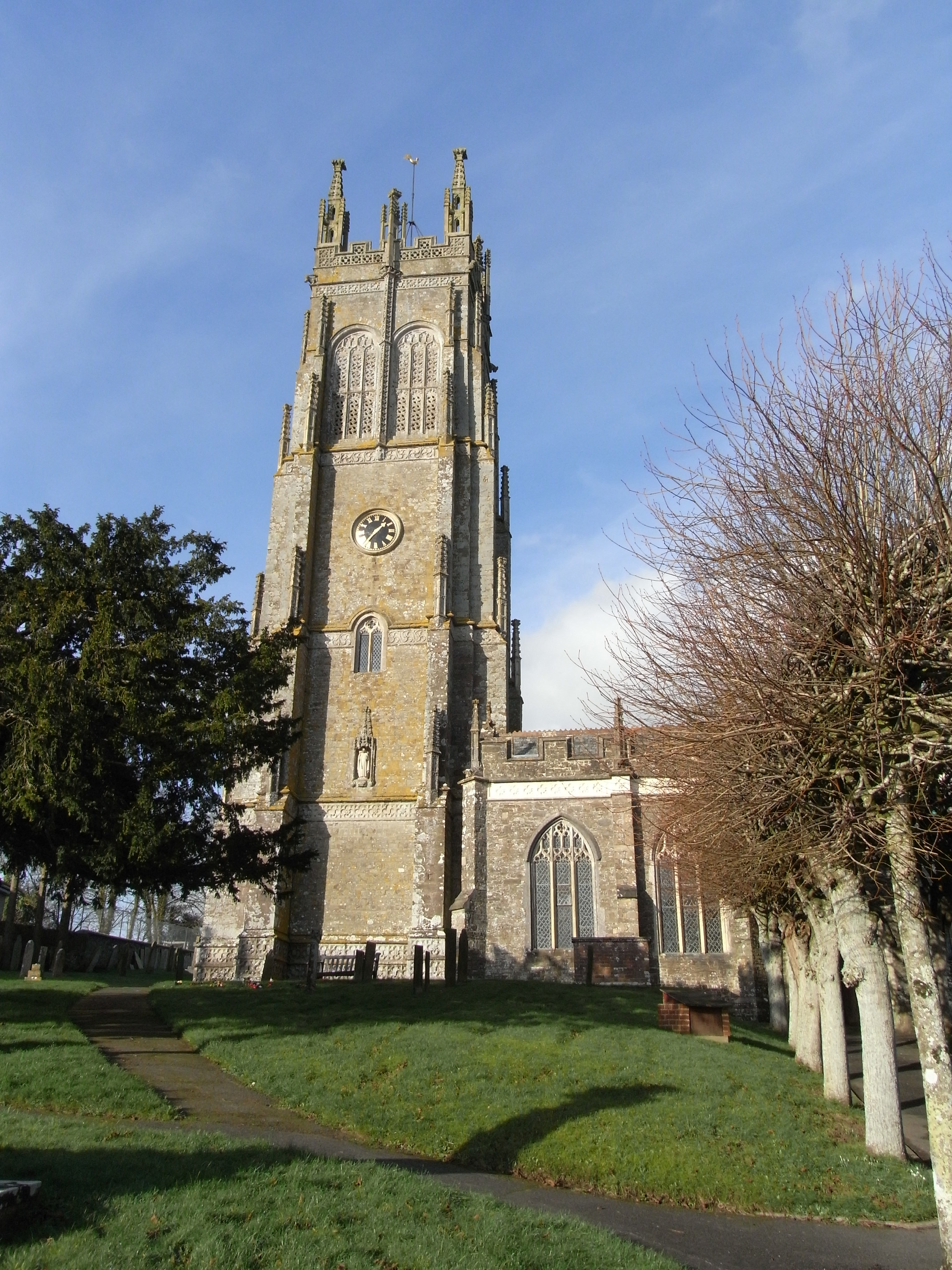
The tower of St Hieritha's Church is, in the opinion of many, unsurpassed in design and proportion among English village churches.

Chittlehampton is the home of St. Hieritha's church and holy well. Until the 16th century many people made pilgrimages to Chittlehampton to visit the well. Today, campanologists travel from far and wide to ring the church's bells. The church is large and of the late Perpendicular period, following a rebuilding in the late 15th century or early 16th. The chancel was rebuilt and enlarged in the 1840s, and further work in 1872 saw the north aisle rebuilt and the roofs and windows restored. The church is a Grade I listed building.

St Hieritha, a 7th-century saint, is said to have been buried under part of the church.

Saint Urith's holy well still stands at the east end of Chittlehampton, now called by the corrupt name of Taddy Well or Saint Teara's Well. The exact burial place of Saint Urith was probably in the small chapel on the north side of the sanctuary of the parish church, which originally contained an image of the saint. This chapel now doubles as a passage leading to a vestry. There is reason to believe that a medieval slab there may still cover Saint Urith's body. There was a regular pilgrimage to her shrine on her feast day, 8 July, until 1539. Offerings left there were sufficient to rebuild the church tower, reputedly the finest in Devon. Even in the last year of pilgrimages, the vicar received £50 from his share of the offerings. This was three times his income from tithes and glebe.

By 1540 the saint's statue had been removed from the church, leading to the further loss of £50 in offerings. The pulpit of the church, carved around 1500, survives and this depicts Urith holding a martyr's palm and the foundation stone of the church. A modern statue now stands in a niche high up on the exterior of the tower and she is also shown in a stained-glass window of the 16th century found at Nettlecombe in Somerset. The pilgrimage has now been revived and villagers still celebrate the legend on her feast day, with a procession to the well. The Trinity College hymn is sung by the congregation, the well is opened and water drawn from it and blessed.

=== The Trinity College hymn ===
Sing, Chittlehampton, sing!
Let all Devon's meadows ring with Holy Gladness for our Saint's renown,
And thou,
Blest maiden pray,
that we on this our day,
May bear our cross and win our heavenly crown.

== Descent of the manor ==
The manor of Chittlehampton was in the royal demesne in 1066. It was subsequently granted to the Earls of Gloucester, who in the time of King Henry III (1216–1272) sub-enfeoffed it to Herbert FitzMatthew for the service of one knight's fee. The chief manor house, long ago demolished, was situated next to the church. From the Earls of Gloucester it descended to the Despencer family and then to the Earls of Warwick. In 1537 Henry Courtenay, 1st Marquess of Exeter, 2nd Earl of Devon, was lord, as revealed by one of the two surviving rolls for the manorial court. He was attainted and executed in 1539 and his land became forfeit to the Crown.

Henry Daubeney, 1st Earl of Bridgewater (1493–1548) was a subsequent lord. It then came into the possession of Sir Lewis Pollard, 1st Baronet (c. 1578 – 1645), lord of the manor of King's Nympton. It was later purchased by Samuel Rolle (died 1747), of Hudscott House within the parish. He was the son of Samuel Rolle (1669–1735), MP, who had inherited Hudscott from his wife Dorothy Lovering. Samuel died childless in 1747, and he bequeathed his property at Chittlehampton to his wealthier cousins the Rolles of Stevenstone. The heir of Hon. Mark Rolle (died 1907) was his nephew Charles Hepburn-Stuart-Forbes-Trefusis, 21st Baron Clinton following whose death in 1957 his great-grandson and heir Gerald Neville Mark Fane-Trefusis, 22nd Baron Clinton sold most of the land he inherited in the parish to meet large death duties payable by the Clinton Estates which comprised over 55,000 acres throughout Devon.

== Twinning ==
Chittlehampton has twinning associations with:

- Baron-sur-Odon (France) since 1986.

== Historic estates ==
- Brightley, Chittlehampton
- Hudscott
- Hawkridge, Chittlehampton

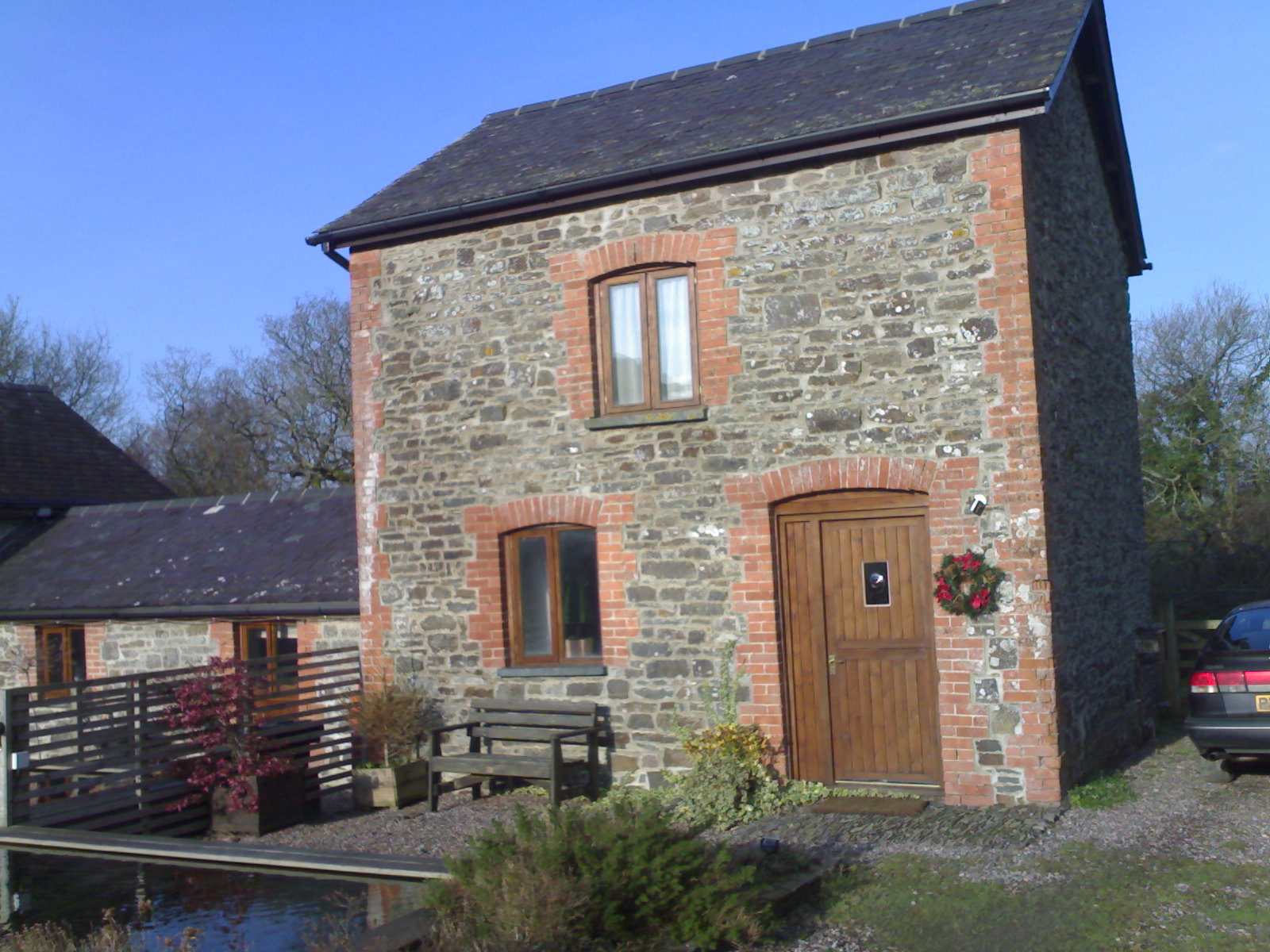
Cider barn at Lerwill Farm
