= Urith =

Brythonic medieval Christian saint

Saint Urith
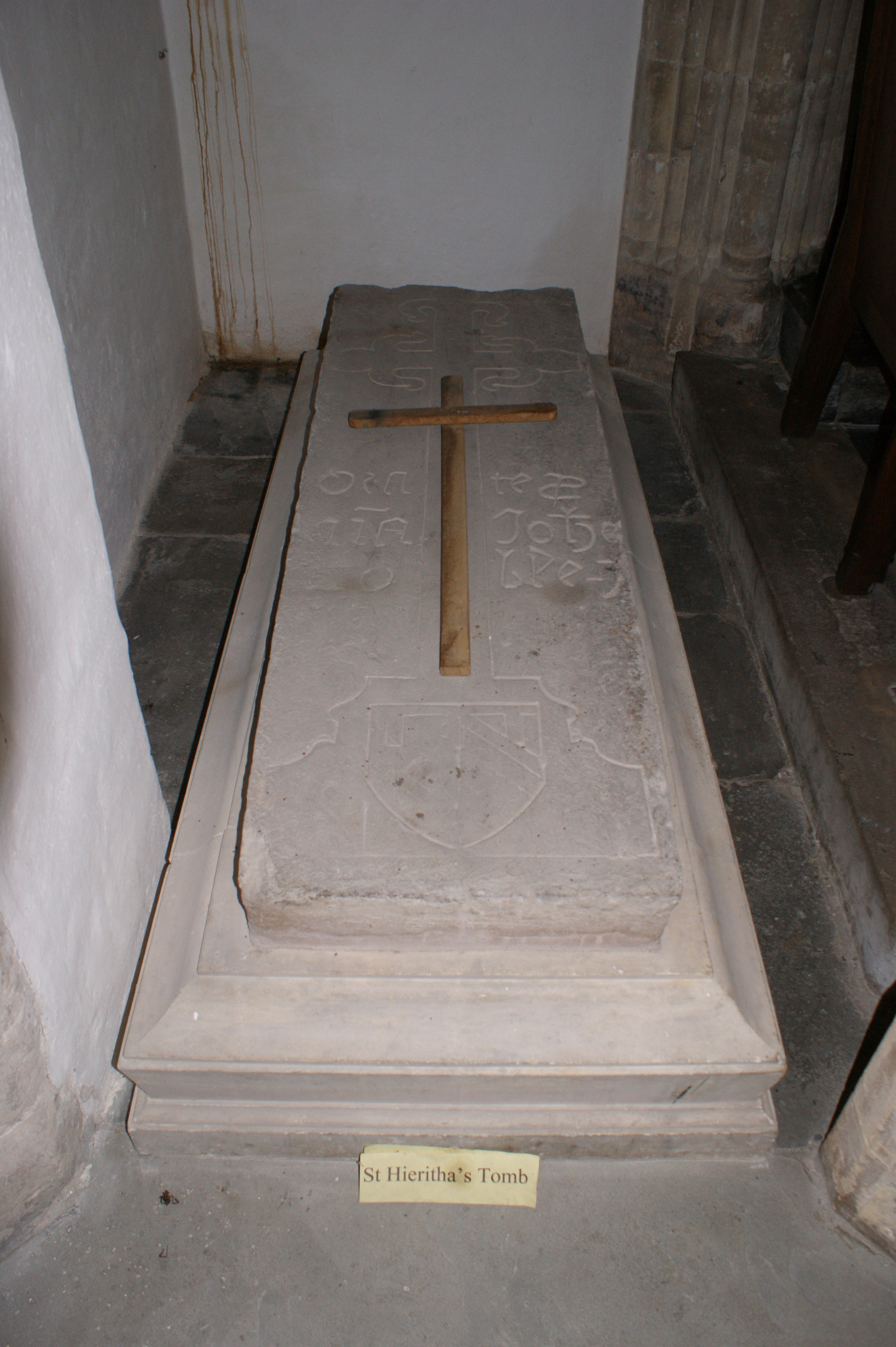
- Ancient slab in St Hieritha's Church, Chittlehampton, believed to cover St. Heiratha's tomb
- Born: East Stowford, Swimbridge, Devon
- Died: Chittlehampton, Devon
- Venerated in: Catholic Church, Anglicanism
- Major shrine: Chittlehampton, Devon
- Feast: 8 July

Urith (also known in Welsh as Iwerydd) was a Christian woman from the Westcountry of Great Britain who was alleged to have been martyred in the 8th century, and subsequently revered as a saint. The name was not uncommon in the English county of Devon. Her feast day is 8 July and her shrine is located in the North Devon village of Chittlehampton. Her name is also known in Latin as Hieritha and occasionally corrupted to Erth.

== History ==
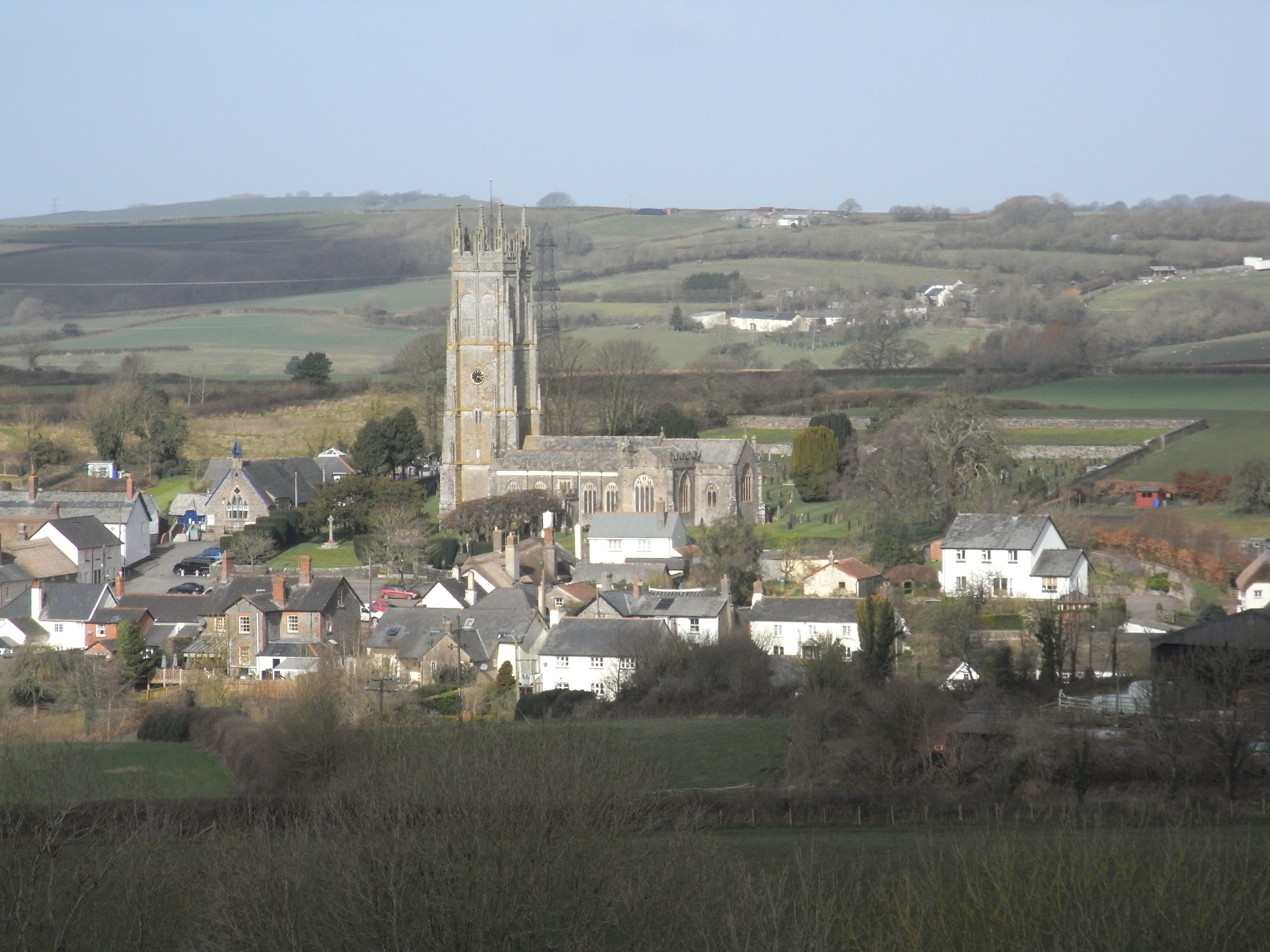
St. Hieritha's, Chittlehampton

Urith is a fairly obscure figure. John Leland makes no mention of her, nor does Capgrave's Nova Legenda Angliae, and Nicholas Roscarock knew little of her apart from the fact of her existence. A book of her life, containing a record of her miracles, was at one time present in her shrine, and appears to be the basis of a rhyming poem in Latin now held by Trinity College, Cambridge. According to both this and William Camden, her legend was as follows:

=== Legend ===
Legend says Saint Urith was born at East Stowford in Swimbridge parish, in the English county of Devon, to an Anglo-Saxon father and unknown mother. She was converted to Christianity by St Kea, lived as a hermit in nearby Chittlehampton, where she founded a church. At the urging of an allegedly jealous, and perhaps pagan, stepmother, some female haymakers beheaded the girl with a scythe, during a period of severe drought. When she fell to the ground, a spring of water burst from the spot and flowers, thought to be scarlet pimpernels, sprang forth wherever a drop of her blood was sprinkled. These last elements of her legend are the same as those found in the Lives of Sidwell and Juthwara. Urith was buried near the site of her martyrdom and a church was later built above her grave.

== Veneration ==
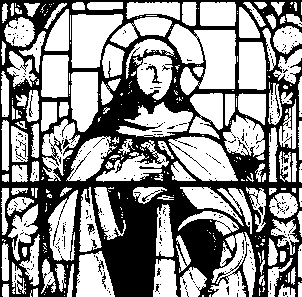
drawing of window in St Mary's Church, South Walsham, Norfolk England depicting Saint Urith.

Saint Urith's holy well still stands at the east end of Chittlehampton, now called by the corrupt name of Taddy Well or Saint Teara's Well. Many of the pilgrims had eye diseases who came to anoint themselves with the holy water. There are still two stone crosses in the parish which may have been guideposts to the shrine. The exact burial place of Saint Urith was probably in the small chapel on the north side of the sanctuary of the parish church, which originally contained an image of the saint. This chapel now doubles as a passage leading to a vestry. There is reason to believe that a medieval slab there may still cover Saint Urith's body. There was a regular pilgrimage to her shrine on her feast day, 8 July, until 1539. Offerings left there were sufficient to rebuild the church tower, reputedly the finest in Devon. Even in the last year of pilgrimages, the vicar received £50 from his share of the offerings. This was three times his income from tithes and glebe. By 1540 the saint's statue had been removed from the church. The pulpit of the church, carved around 1500, survives and this depicts Urith holding a martyr's palm and the foundation stone of the church. A modern statue now stands in a niche high up on the exterior of the tower and she is also shown in a stained-glass window of the 16th century found at Nettlecombe in Somerset.

Continuing the tradition, the pilgrimage has now been revived and villagers still celebrate the legend on her feast day, with a procession to the well. The Trinity College hymn is sung by the congregation, the well is opened and water drawn from it and blessed.

=== Trinity College hymn ===
"Sing, Chittlehampton, sing!
Let all Devon's meadows ring with Holy Gladness for our Saint's renown,
And thou,
Blest maiden pray,
that we on this our day,
May bear our cross and win our heavenly crown".

== Devonshire girls baptised Urith ==
- Hyeritha Trefusis, a daughter of Robert Edward Trefusis (1843–1930), vicar of Chittlehampton 1867–89 and later suffragan Bishop of Crediton. She became known to local parishioners as "Miss Urith".
- Urith Pole, a daughter of Sir John Pole, 3rd Baronet (1649–1708), of Shute, Devon, and wife of Sir John Trevelyan, 2nd Baronet (1670–1755), of Nettlecombe Court in Somerset. A stained-glass figure of St Urith survives in an early 16th-century window in Nettlecombe Church, with the Latin inscription Sancta Uritha.
- Urith Shapcott (born 1617), wife of Sir Courtenay Pole, 2nd Baronet (1618–1695). She was the daughter of the lawyer Thomas Shapcott (1587–1670) of Shapcott in the parish of Knowstone, Devon, by his wife Urith Sotherin (d. 1661) of Cheshire.
- Urith Chichester, a daughter of Sir John Chichester (1519/20 – 1569) of Raleigh in Devon, who in 1591 married John Trevelyan of Nettlecombe Court in Somerset. It may have been in memory of this marriage that the existing stained-glass figure of a female saint (possibly St Sidwell) in a window of Nettlecombe Church was given the inscription Sancta Uritha.

== Sources ==
- Farmer, David Hugh. (1978). The Oxford Dictionary of Saints. Oxford: Oxford University Press
- Withycombe, E. G. (1950) The Oxford Dictionary of English Christian Names; 2nd ed. Oxford: Clarendon Press; p. 272
