= Hudscott =

Historic estate in Devon, England

Coordinates: 51.0064°N 3.9262°W

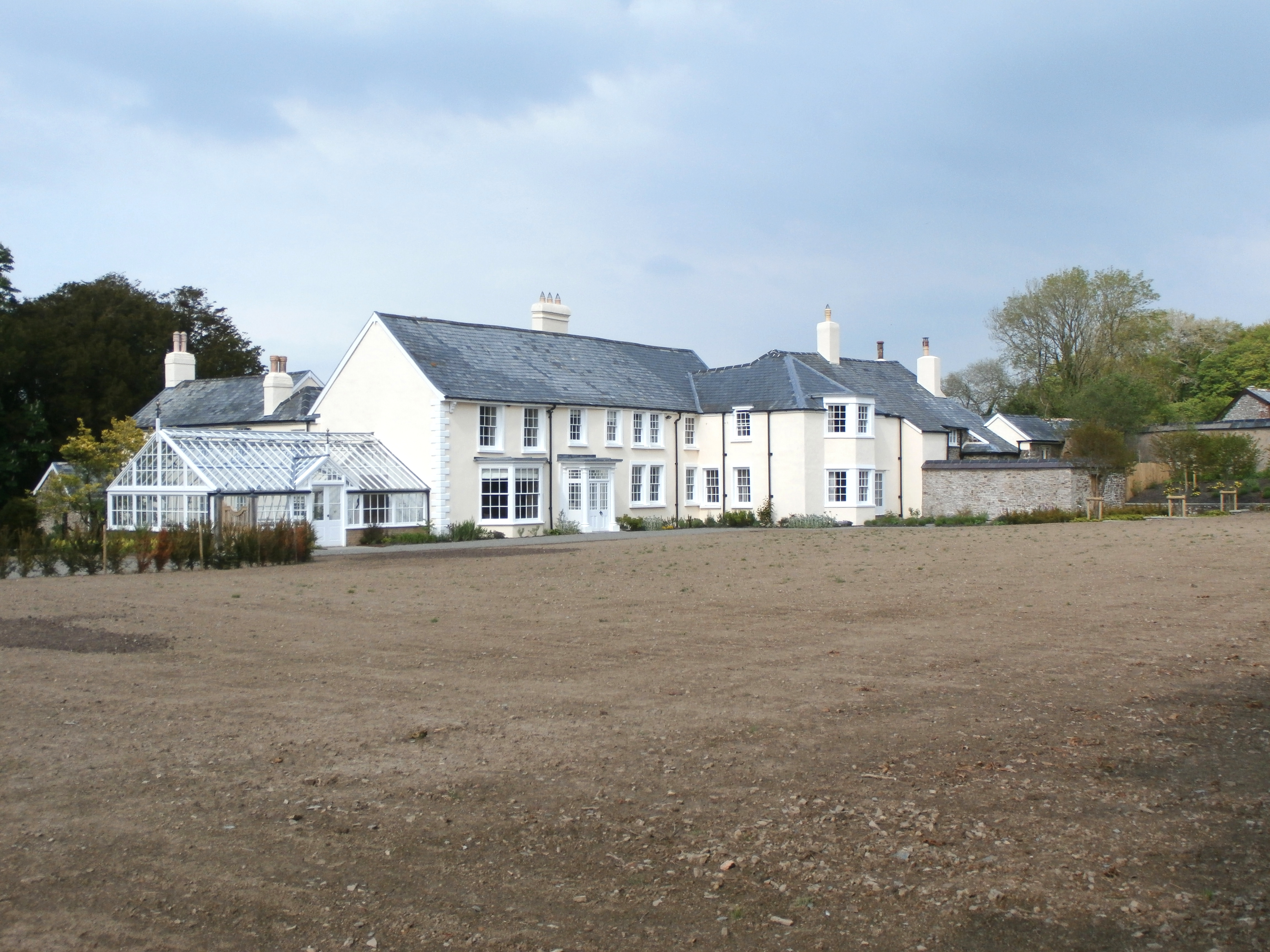
Hudscott House, south front

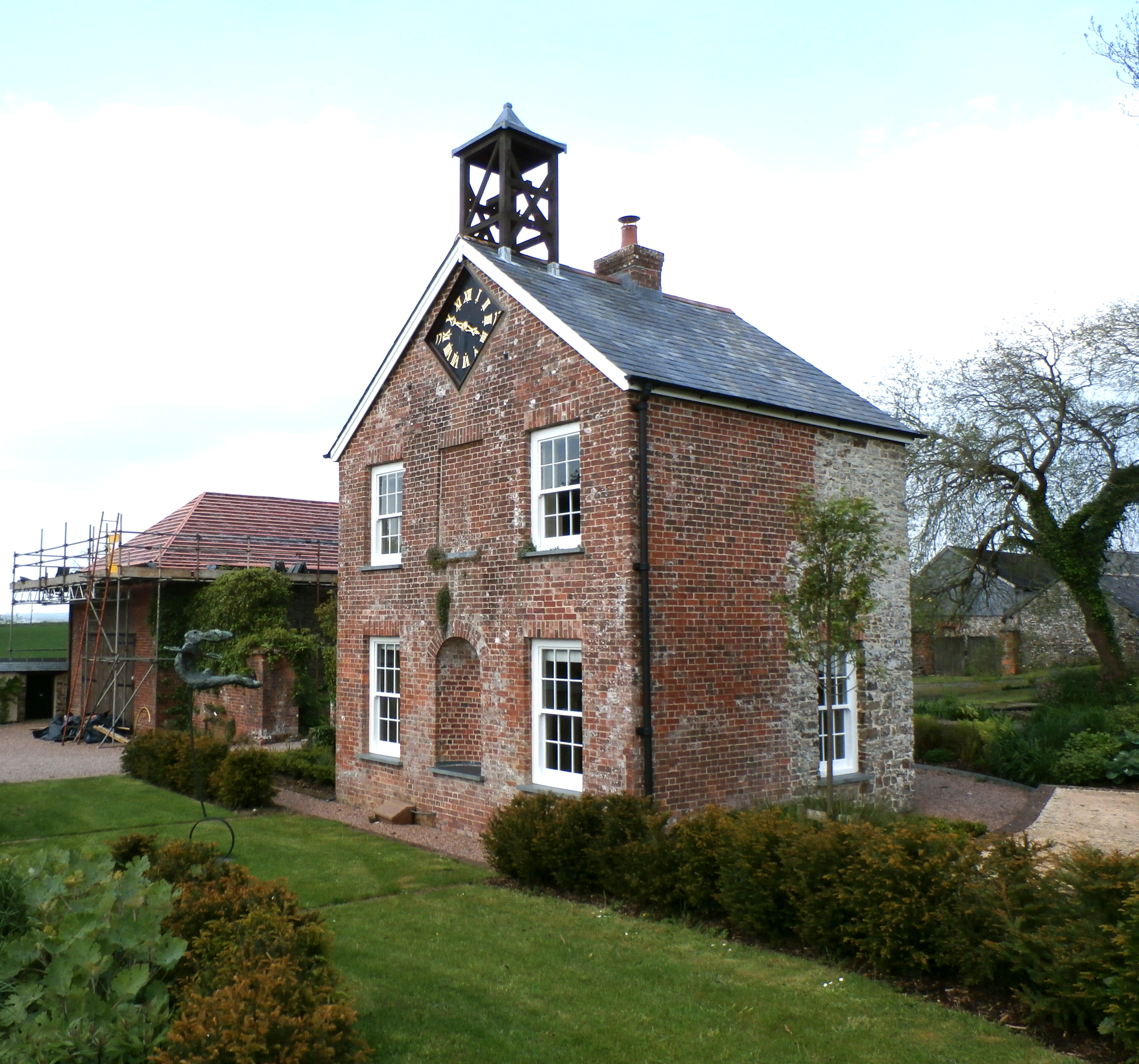
Georgian Coachman's House and Clock Tower 20 metres east of Hudscott House, with date 1711 inscribed on clockface, built by Samuel Rolle and his wife Dorothy Lovering, heiress of Hudscott. Grade II* listed. The original clock mechanism made in 1711 by Lewis Pridham survives

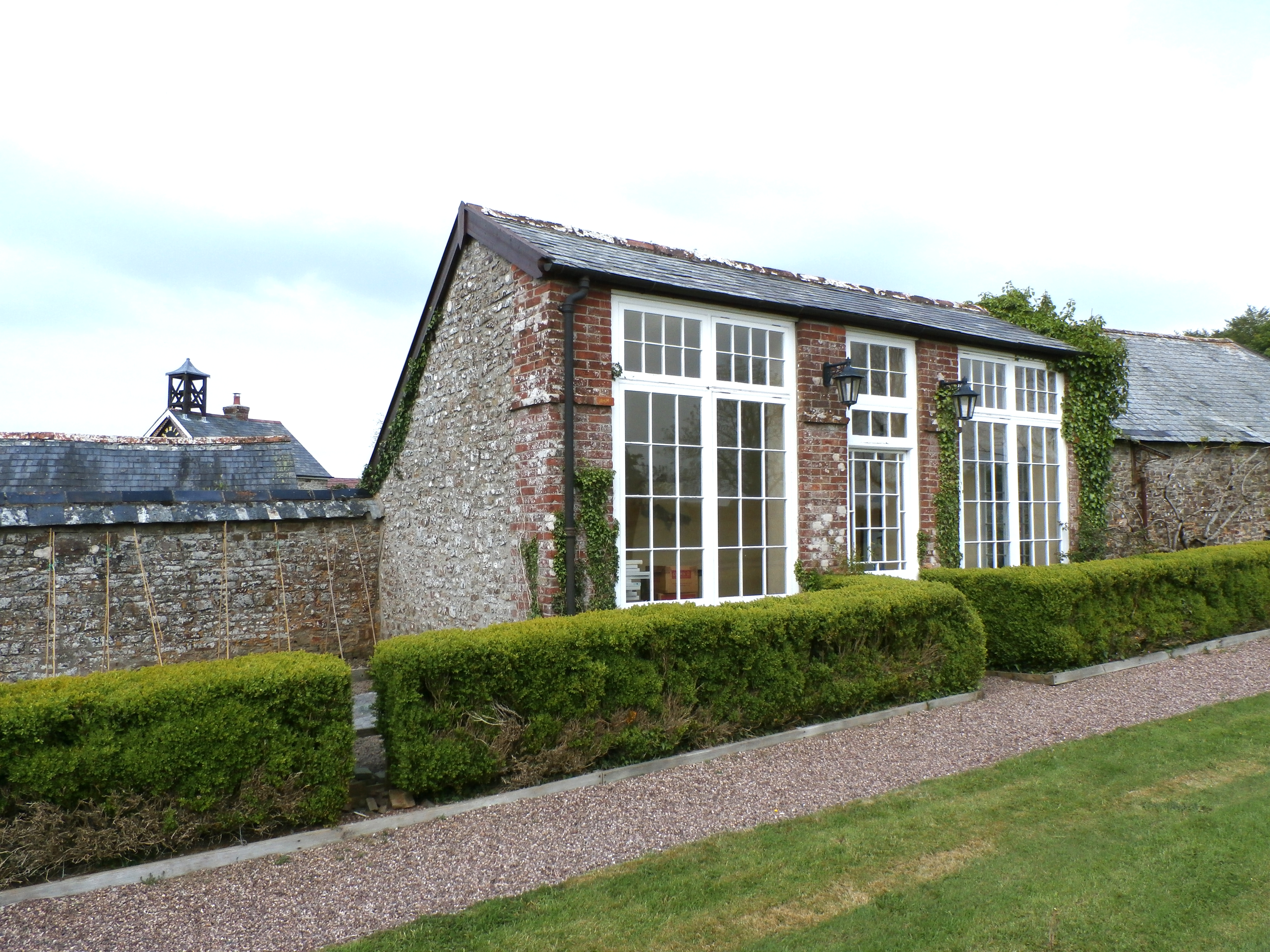
Early 18th-century orangery at Hudscott. Grade II listed

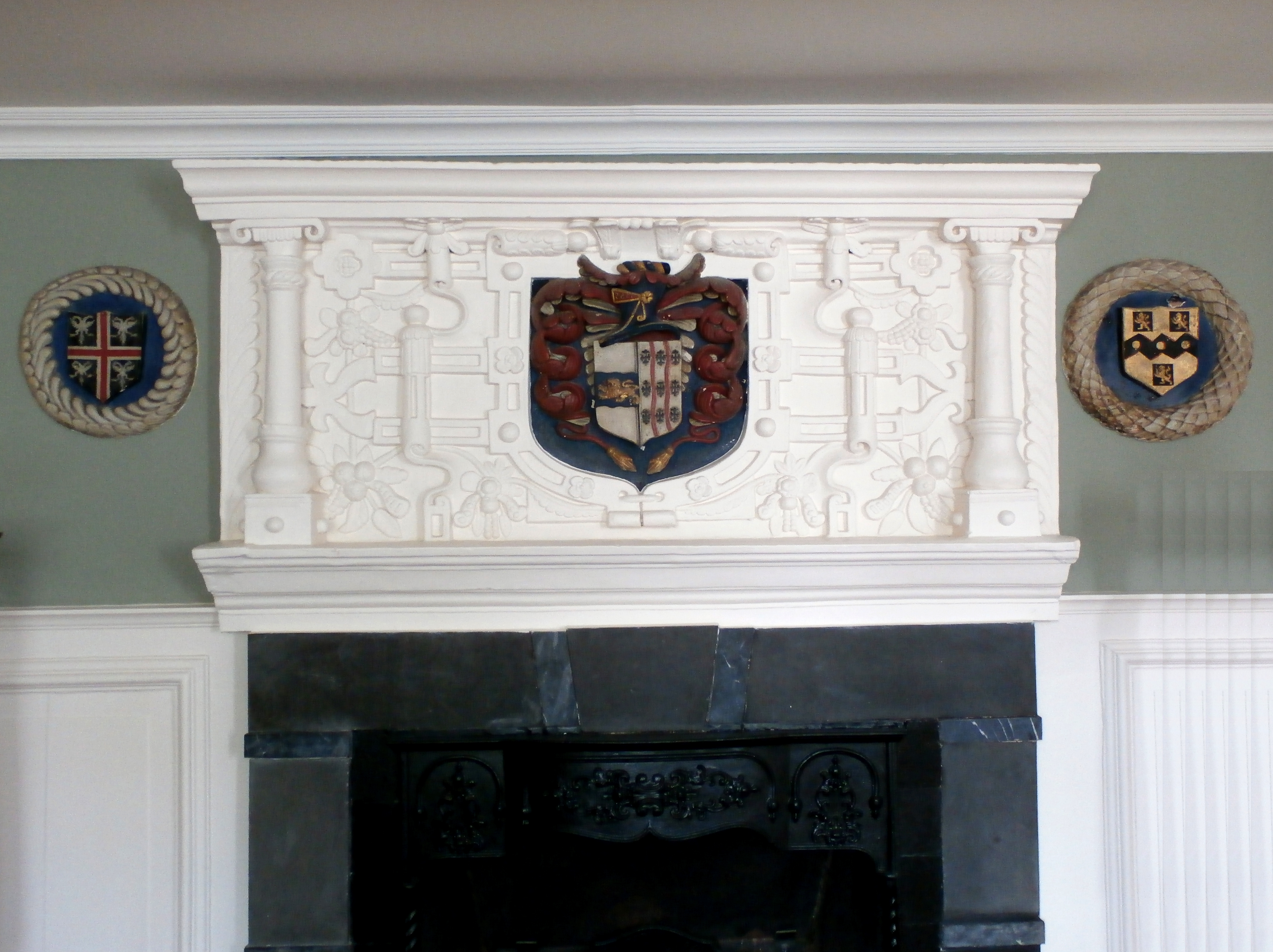
17th-century plasterwork overmantel in hall of Hudscott House. Within a rectangle of decorative strapwork is shown a heraldic escutcheon with arms of Lovering impaling Dodderidge. To either side are two later roundels within wreaths with escutcheons showing arms of Rolle (right) and of Venner(?) (left)

Hudscott is a historic estate within the parish and former manor of Chittlehampton, Devon. From 1700 it became a seat of a junior branch of the influential Rolle family of Heanton Satchville, Petrockstowe and in 1779 became a secondary seat of the senior Rolle family of Stevenstone, then the largest landowner in Devon. Hudscott House, classified in 1967 a Grade II* listed building, is situated one mile south-east of the village of Chittlehampton. It was largely rebuilt in the 17th century by the Lovering family and in the late 17th century became a refuge for ejected Presbyterial ministers. In 1737 its then occupant Samuel II Rolle (1703-1747) purchased the manor of Chittlehampton and thus Hudscott House became in effect the manor house of Chittlehampton.

== Descent ==
=== Pre Norman Conquest ===
The estate derives its name from having been before the Norman Conquest of 1066 the cott of the Saxon cottar named Hudda.

=== 13th century ===
Hudescote is listed in the Assize Roll of 1281, and paid a chief rent of 6 1/2 d per annum as one of the 10 freeholdings within the manor of Chittlehampton. Others included Brightley and Hawkridge.

=== Venner ===
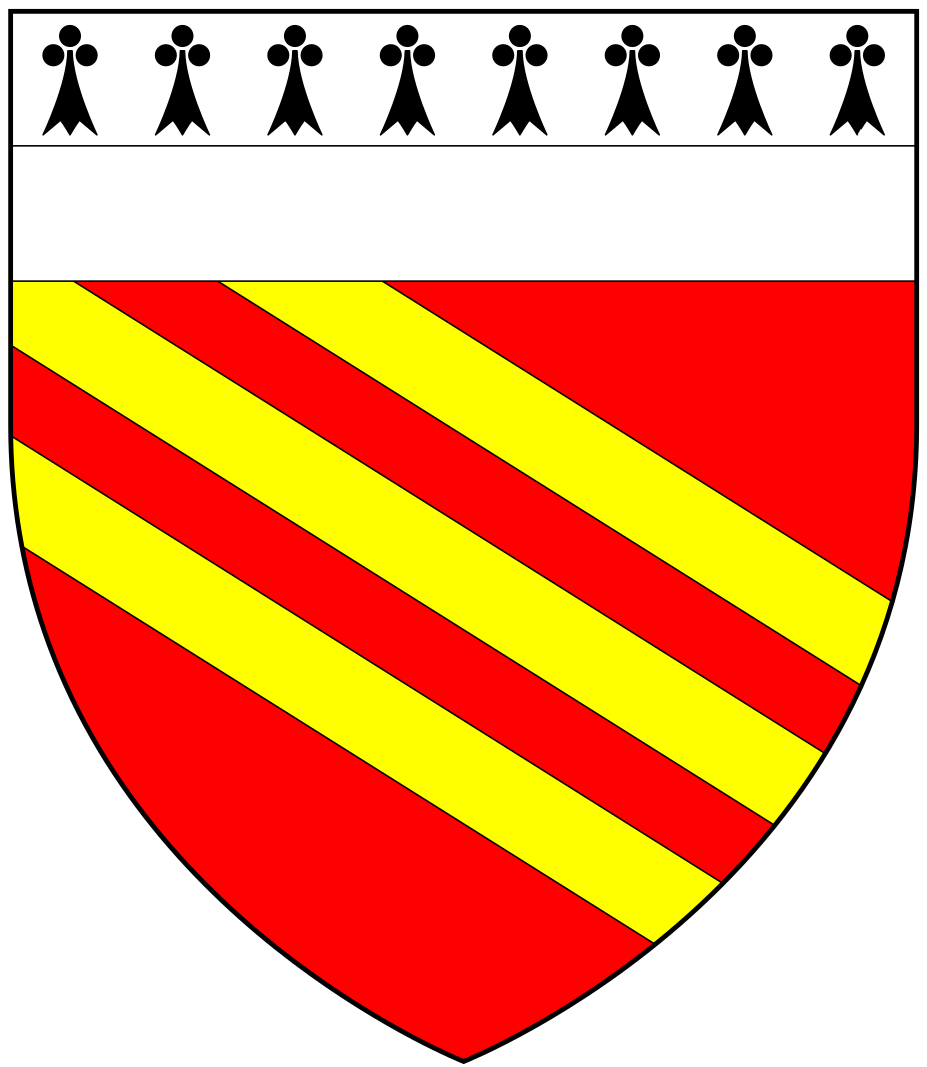
Arms of Venner of Hudscott, Chittlehampton: Gules, three bends or a chief per fess ermine and argent

The first known family to have resided at Hudscott was that of Venner. The descent was as follows:

==== Robert Venner ====
Robert Venner of Hudescot who married Joane Brighte, daughter of William Brighte. The Brett (alias "Brighte", "Brite", etc.) family were from Pilland in the parish of Pilton near Barnstaple and Robert Brett (died 1540) was lord of the manor of Pilland and the last steward of Pilton Priory before the Dissolution of the Monasteries The Brett family was from Whitestaunton in Somerset and had married the heiress of Pilland late in the 15th century. The Brett family is today represented by Viscount Esher.

==== William I Venner ====
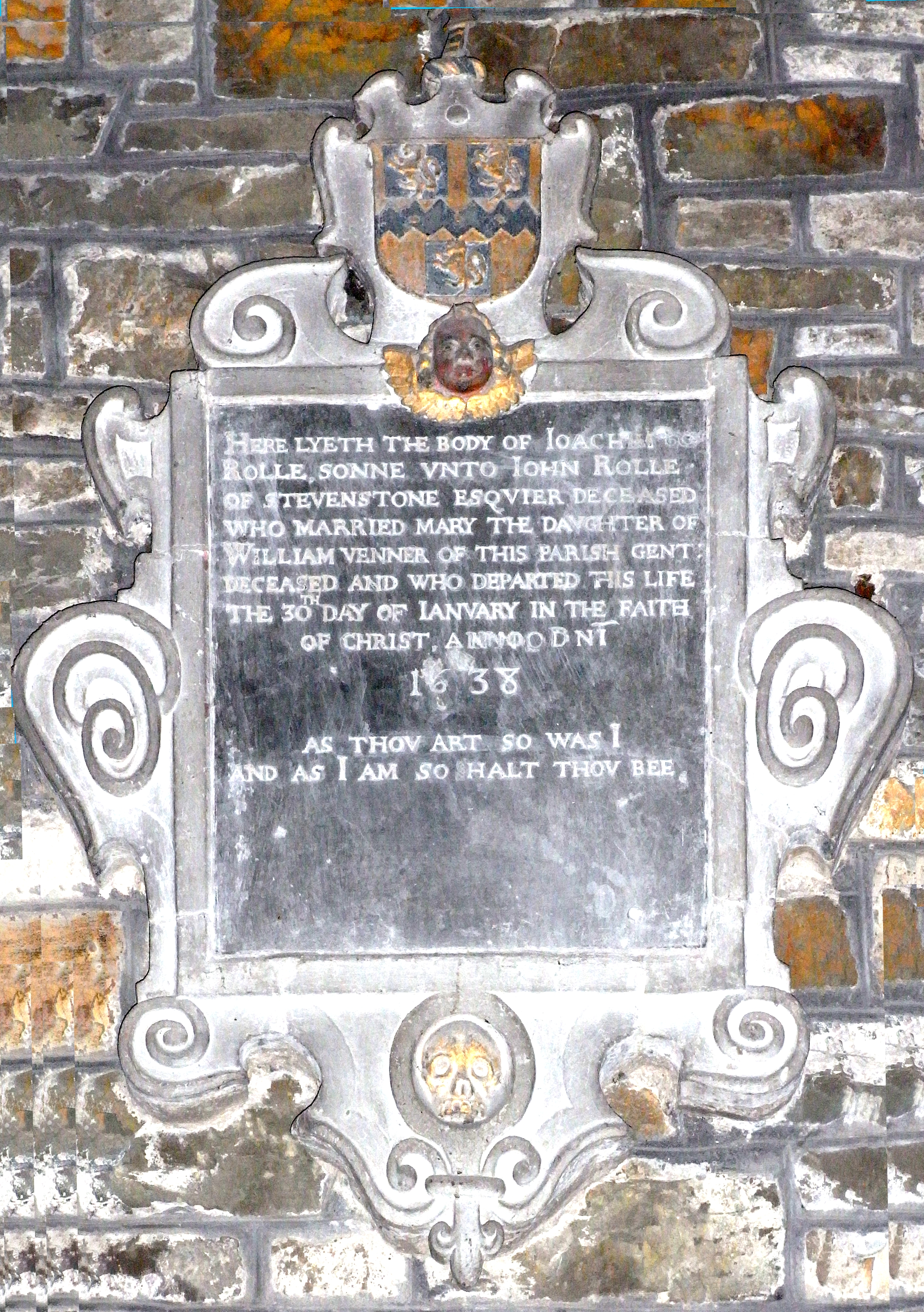
Mural monument to Joachim Rolle (died 1638), son-in-law to William I Venner, Chittlehampton Church, Devon

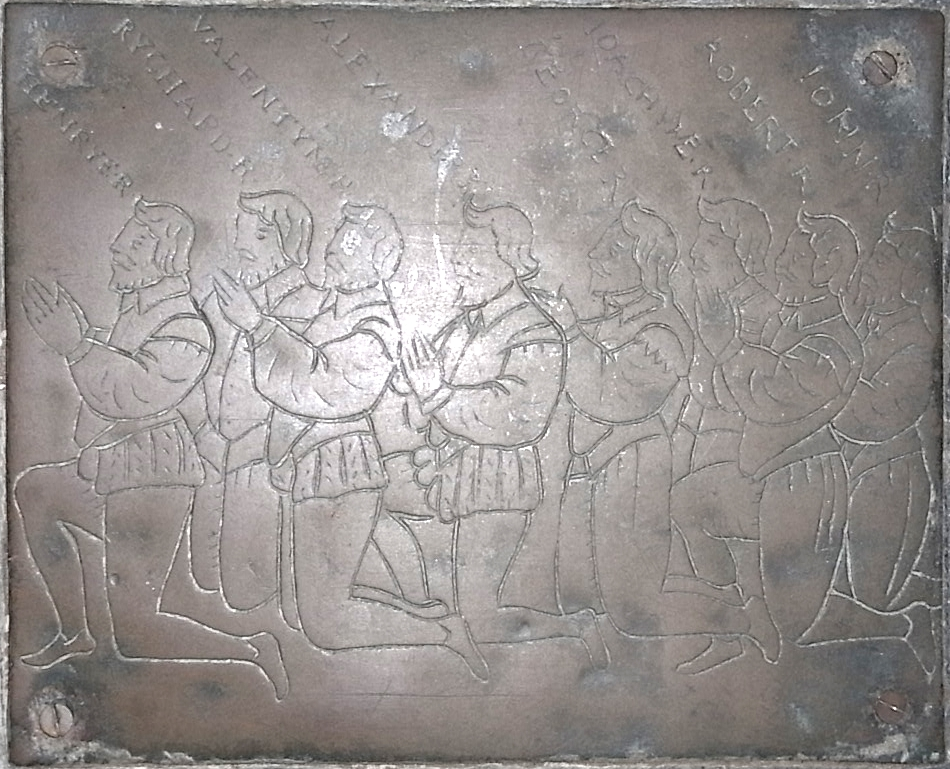
The eight sons of John Rolle by his wife Margaret Ford. Their names are inscribed left to right: Henrye R, Rychard R, Valentyne R, Alexander R, George R, Joachyme R, Robert R, John R. Monumental brass panel to right of brass of their mother Margaret Ford, floor of south aisle, St Giles in the Wood Church

William I Venner "of Chittlehampton" (son), who in 1578 at Chittlehampton married Elizabeth Copleston, daughter of Humphry Copleston of Instow, a great-grandson of Philip Copleston of Copleston in the parish of Colebrooke, Devon, Sheriff of Devon in 1472. The Copleston family is according to a traditional rhyme one of the most ancient Devonshire gentry families:

"Crocker, Cruwys and Copplestone,
When The Conqueror came were all at home".

William's daughter Mary Venner (died 1651) married Joachim Rolle (died 1639), the 5th or 6th son of John Rolle (1522–1570) of Stevenstone, Devon, by his wife Margaret Ford, daughter of John Ford of Ashburton. Joachim and his wife appear to have lived at Hudscott as their mural monument survives on the north wall of the aisle of St Hieritha's parish church and both were buried at Chittlehampton. Joachim Rolle's mural monument, on top of which are displayed the Rolle arms and crest, is inscribed thus:

"Here lyeth the body of Joachim Rolle sonne unto John Rolle of Stevenstone Esquier deceased who married Mary the daughter of William Venner of this parish Gent deceased and who departed this life the 30th day of January in the faith of Christ Anno Dni 1638. As thou art so was I, and as I am so shalt thou bee"

A depiction of Joachim kneeling with his seven brothers survives on a monumental brass panel to the right of the brass of his mother Margaret Ford, on the floor of the south aisle, St Giles' Church, St Giles in the Wood, Devon, the parish church of Stevenstone. Joachim's first cousin Abell Rolle (son of Robert Rolle, 5th son of the patriarch George Rolle) also had a connection with Chittlehampton as he married Gertrude Acland, daughter of Anthony II Acland (1568-1614) of Hawkridge, Chittlehampton.

==== Humphry Venner (died 1647) ====
Humphry Venner (died 1647) (son), who is listed in the Chittlehampton manorial court roll of 1641. He married twice, firstly to Elizabeth Farwel (daughter of Richard Farwel of Somerset) by whom he had two daughters; secondly in 1610 to Dorothie Whiddon, daughter of Francis Whiddon of Chagford. By his 2nd wife he had 4 sons and 3 daughters. His eldest son John Venner (1612-pre-1646) died unmarried and predeceased his father, which left his younger brother William Venner (died 1690) as heir to Hudscott.

==== William II Venner (died 1690) ====
William II Venner (died 1690) (second son), who married Elizabeth of unrecorded family, by whom he had 1 son and 2 daughters. His son William Venner (born 1657) predeceased his father, as did his sister Susanna Venner (1652-1671), which left the surviving daughter Elizabeth Venner (born 1657) as sole heiress. Elizabeth married John II Lovering (died 1686) of Huxhill in the parish of Weare Giffard. It appears however that Hudscott had been the residence of his father John I Lovering and his wife Dorothy Dodderidge, as the arms of Lovering impaling Dodderidge exist on an escutcheon within a scroll-work plaster overmantel in the hall. Andrews (1958) suggested that John I Lovering was a nephew of William Venner, and that at some time before his death in 1690 Venner had handed over the estate to Lovering.

=== Lovering ===
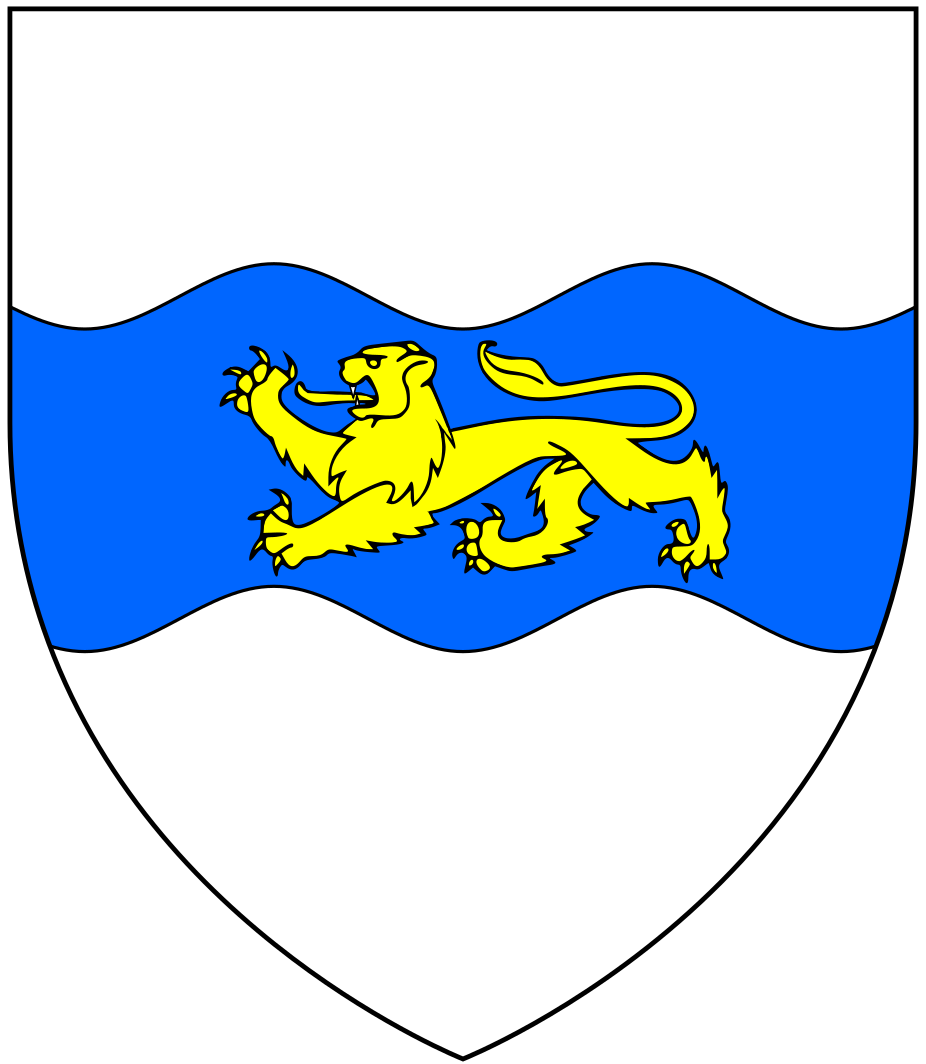
Arms of Lovering of Hudscott, Chittlehampton, as seen on Rolle mural monument, as escutcheon of pretence, Chittlehampton Church: Argent, on a fesse wavy azure a lion passant or

==== John I Lovering (died 1675) ====
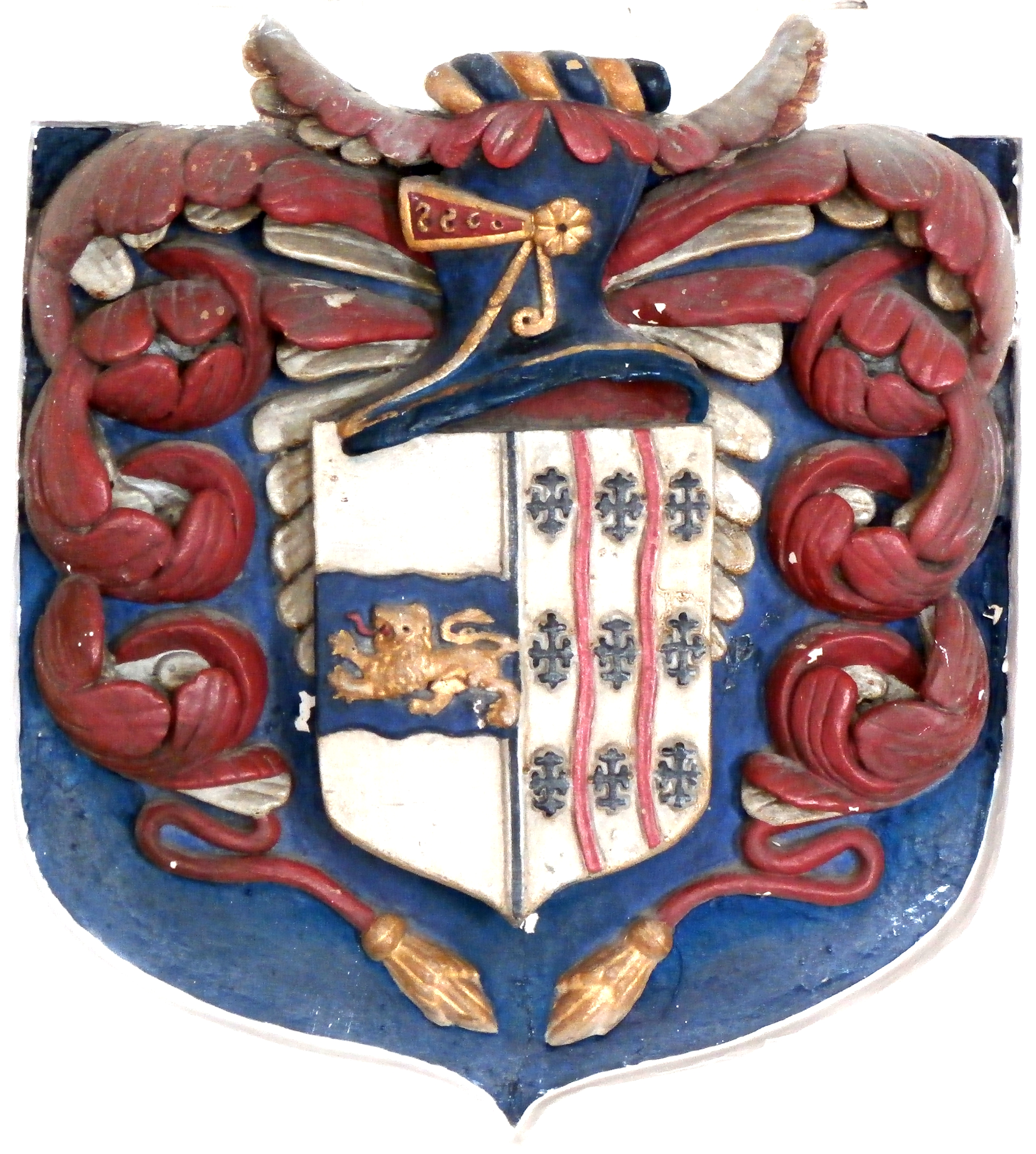
Detail from 17th-century plasterwork overmantel in hall of Hudscott House, showing arms of Lovering of Hudscott (Argent, on a fesse wavy azure a lion passant or) impaling Dodderidge (Argent, two pales wavy azure between nine crosses croslet gules) here shown apparently with tinctures transposed. They represent the marriage of John I Lovering (died 1675) to Dorcas Doddridge, sister and co-heiress of John Doddridge (1610-1666), MP, of Bremridge, Filleigh, and daughter of Pentecost Dodderidge of Barnstaple. The crest of Lovering (of unknown form) is missing from on top of the helm

John I Lovering (died 1675) was a merchant of Weare Giffard. The Lovering family held at some time the north Devon manor of Bittadon. It is not clear how he came to reside at Hudscott; Andrews (1958) suggested that John I Lovering was a nephew of William Venner, and that at some time before his death in 1690 Venner had handed over the estate to Lovering. He married Dorcas Doddridge, sister and co-heiress of John Doddridge (1610-1666), MP, of Bremridge, Filleigh. She was the daughter of Pentecost Dodderidge (died c. 1650) of Barnstaple, MP, by his wife Elizabeth Wescombe. Pentecost Dodderidge was the brother and heir of Sir John Dodderidge (1555-1628), a Judge of the King's Bench, who had purchased for his seat the estate of Bremridge, near South Molton. Bremridge survives today, but without the demolished wings of the grand Dodderidge mansion, but the arms of Dodderidge survive above the front door. The judge's magnificent effigy survives in the Lady Chapel of Exeter Cathedral. The Dodderidge family were important merchants and ship-owners in Barnstaple and their Elizabethan mansion survived until the early 20th century in Cross Street, Barnstaple, until it was demolished to make way for a new post office. The oak panelling and chimneypiece of one room however was saved and now lines the walls of one of the rooms in the Barnstaple guildhall. The arms of Lovering impaling Dodderidge exist at Hudscott on an escutcheon within a scroll-work plaster overmantel in the hall. It was apparently Dorcas Dodderidge who was referred to in an 1871 text on the Great Ejection of 1662:

On the road to Umberleigh, five miles from South Molton, there stands a fine old English mansion called Hudscott, where at this time (1662) there lived a noble puritan lady, who like Phoebe, had been a 'succour of many'. It was her delight to entertain such men as John Flavel of Torrington and other dejected ministers, whose writings, the labours of a forced retirement, have become the inheritance of the whole church.

This referred to about two thousand puritan clergy who after the Restoration of the Monarchy in 1660 had refused to use the Book of Common Prayer which had been banned during the Commonwealth but then had been restored for compulsory usage by the Act of Uniformity 1662. Such clergy were then ejected from their livings and in 1664 were forbidden by Parliament, having passed the Five Mile Act, to preach within 5 miles of an incorporated town. The house incorporates a small former chapel, which may have been used during this time. Another of the rare Devonshire protectoresses of ejected clergy at this time was Rachael Fane (1612/13-1680), wife of Henry Bourchier, 5th Earl of Bath of Tawstock Court, near Barnstaple, whose monument in Tawstock Church states: She was a humble and devout daughter of the Church of England and in times of persecution a mother to the ejected Fathers and in these parts almost their only protectress.

==== John II Lovering (died 1686) ====
John II Lovering (died 1686), of Huxhill in the parish of Weare Giffard, was a merchant trading at Barnstaple. He was the son of John I Lovering (died 1675) a merchant of Weare Giffard by his wife Dorcas Doddridge, sister and co-heiress of John Doddridge (died 1666), MP, of Bremridge, South Molton. John II Lovering in 1679/80 purchased from John Wichehalse of Ley (now Lee Abbey) in the parish of Lynmouth, and of Chard, the manors of Lynton and Countisbury. John Wichehalse was the nephew of William Venner, John II Lovering's father-in-law. John II Lovering is described in the conveyance indenture dated 24 May 1680 as of Weare Giffard. His residence there appears to have been at Huxhill Barton. He also purchased in 1645 from Adam Lugg of Barnstaple the manor of East Ilkerton and a moiety of Sparhanger, Radispray and North Fursehill.

John II Lovering appears to have been an exporter of herring fish to Spain, as the following recorded lawsuit of 1658 suggests: "John Martin v. John Lovering: Consignment of fish to St. Lucar or Seville in Spain. Touching a former suit also.: Devon; Spain".

He is mentioned in the historical romance Lorna Doone (1869) by Richard Doddridge Blackmore as follows:

"And it is a very grievous thing, which touches small landowners, to see an ancient family day by day decaying: and when we heard that Ley Barton itself, and all the Manor of Lynton were under a heavy mortgage debt to John Lovering of Weare-Gifford, there was not much, in our little way, that we would not gladly do or suffer for the benefit of De Whichehalse".

Chanter (1906) states the account in Lorna Doone to be confused.

John II Lovering married Elizabeth Venner, heiress of Hudscott. He had by Elizabeth two sons, John Lovering and Venner Lovering who both predeceased their father without progeny, and two daughters:

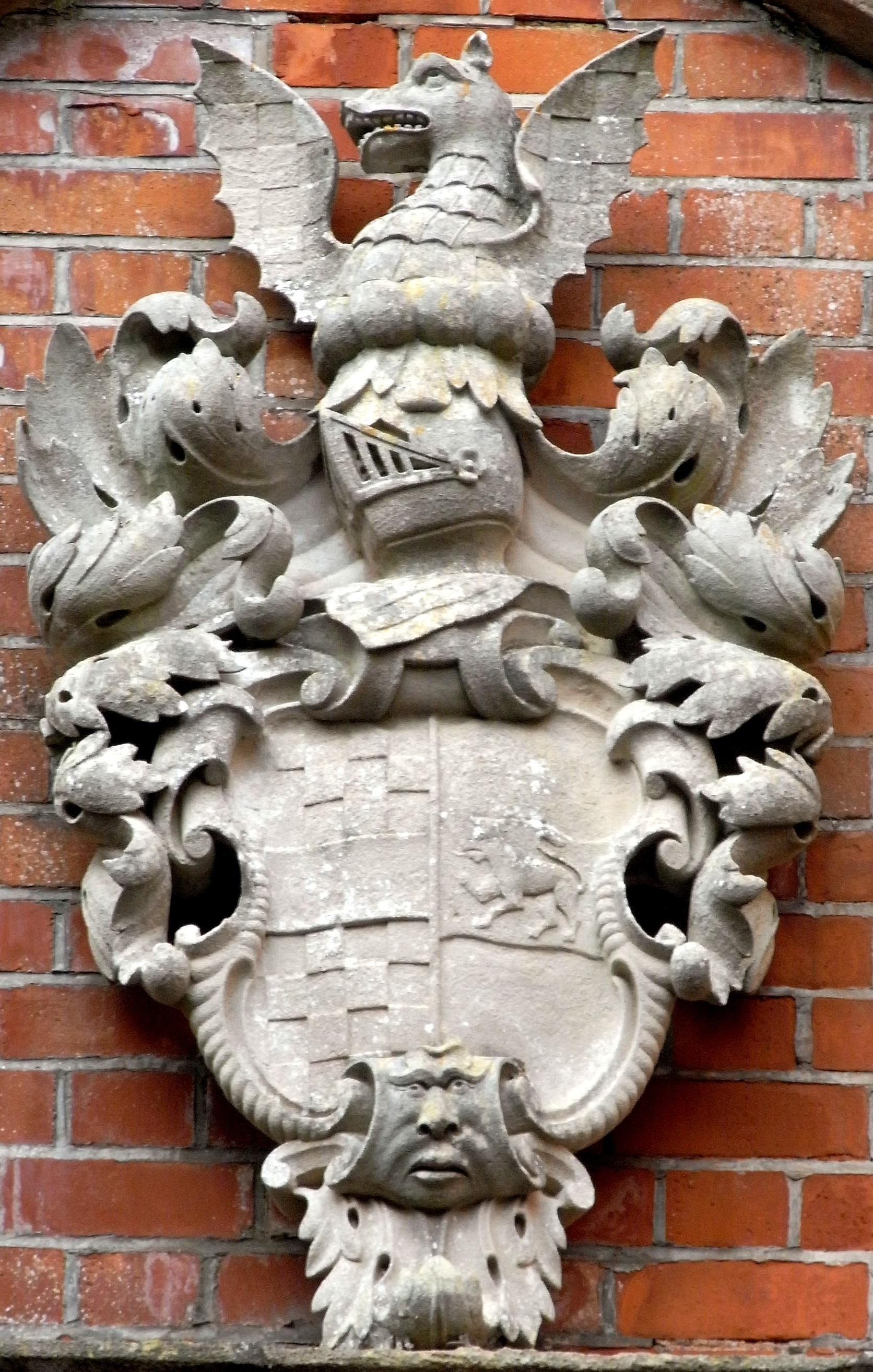
Arms of Richard II Acland (1679-1729) of Fremington (Chequy argent and sable, a fesse gules) impaling the arms of his wife Susanna Lovering (d.1747) (Argent, on a fesse wavy azure a lion passant or). Sculpted heraldic achievement (circa 1700-1729) on pediment of brick archway to stable block, Fremington House

  - Susanna Lovering (died 1747), who in 1700 married Richard II Acland (1679-1729), lord of the manor of Fremington, near Barnstaple, MP for Barnstaple 1708-13. Shortly after his marriage he built the large and grand mansion house known as Fremington House, which survives with 19th century alterations, and displays above the entrance door of the south front and on the pediment of the archway to the stable block the arms of Acland impaling Lovering. Acland succeeded his wife's brother-in-law Samuel Rolle as MP for Barnstaple. All Susannah's sons died without progeny, and only her youngest daughter Susanna Acland left progeny, by her husband William Barbor, who inherited the manor of Fremington.
  - Dorothy Lovering (1675-1735), heiress of Hudscott, who in 1700 married Samuel I Rolle (1669-1735), apparently her first cousin (see below).

=== Rolle ===
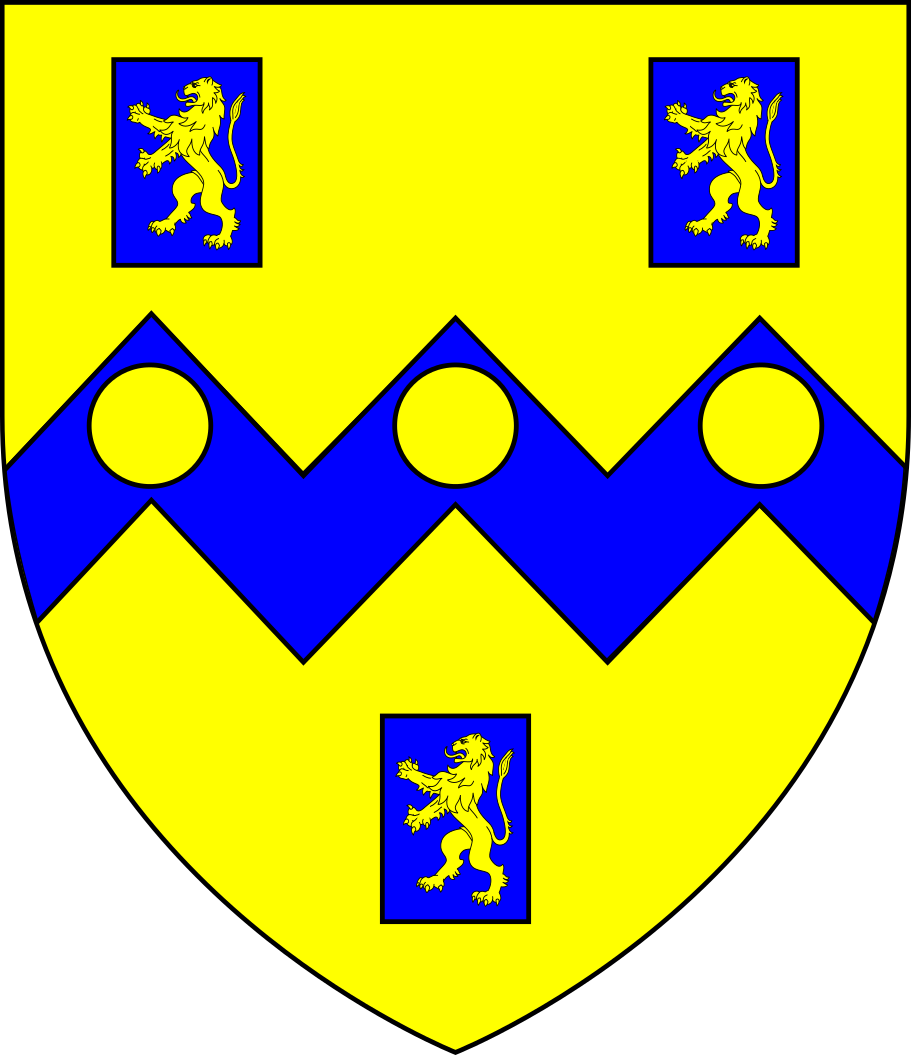
Arms of Rolle: Or, on a fesse dancetté between three billets azure each charged with a lion rampant of the first three bezants

==== Samuel I Rolle (1669-1735) ====
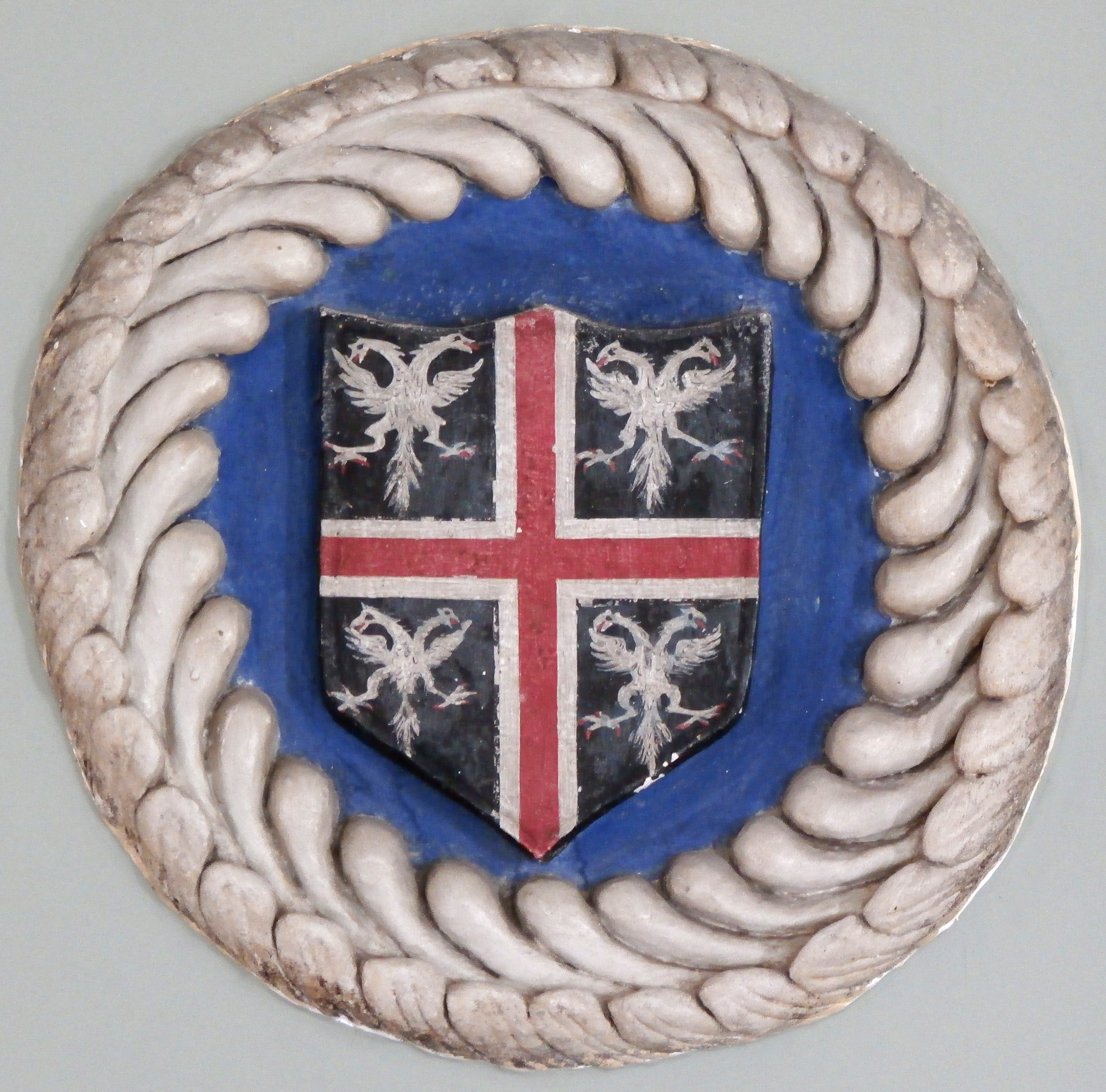
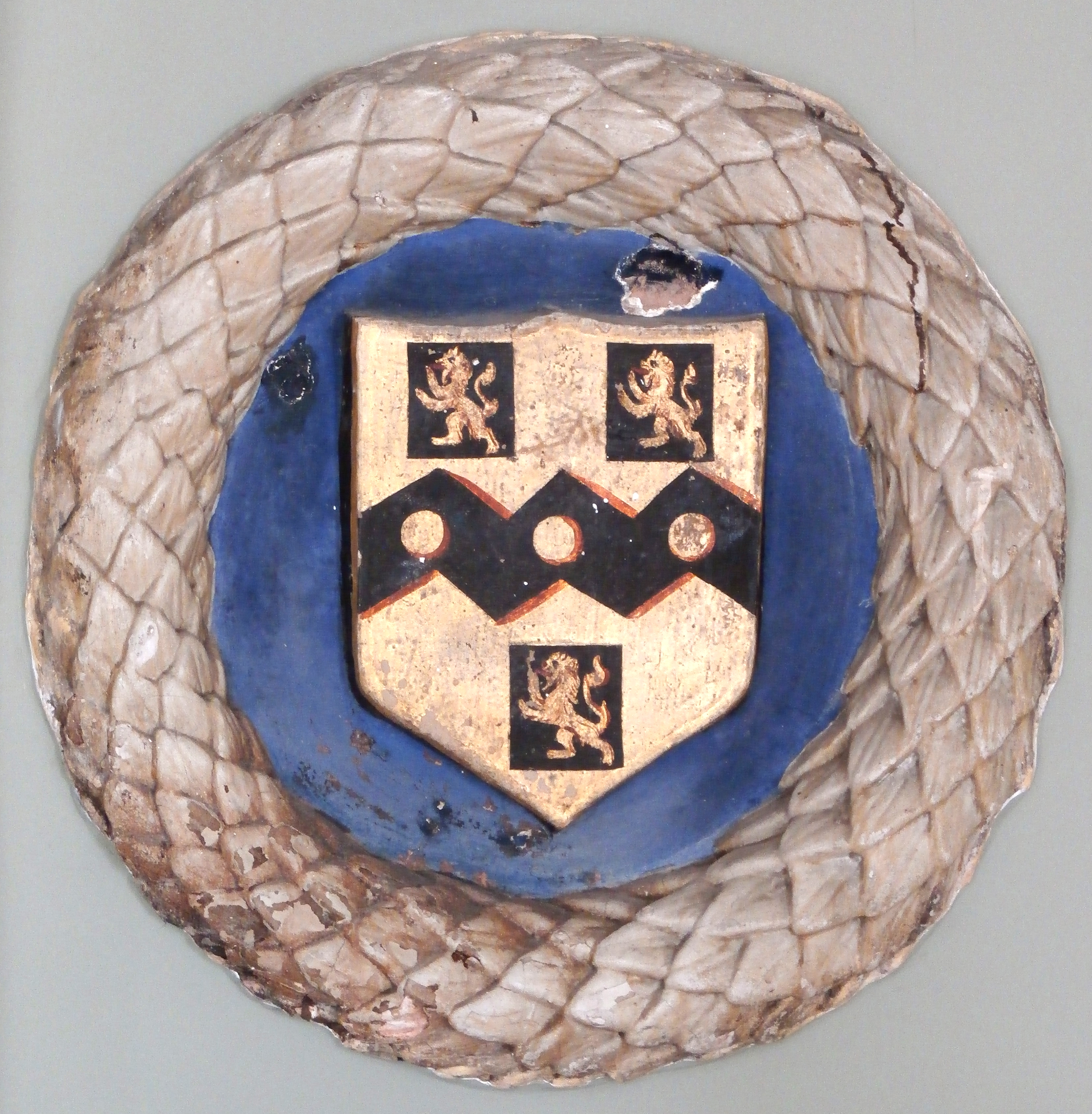
Pair of heraldic escutcheons within chaplets, either side of 17th-century overmantel, Hudscott House, showing left: Sable, a cross argent voided gules between four eagles with two heads displayed of the second (apparently the arms of Fenner (sic) of Rose Ash); right: Or, on a fesse dancetté between three billets azure each charged with a lion rampant of the first three bezants (Rolle)

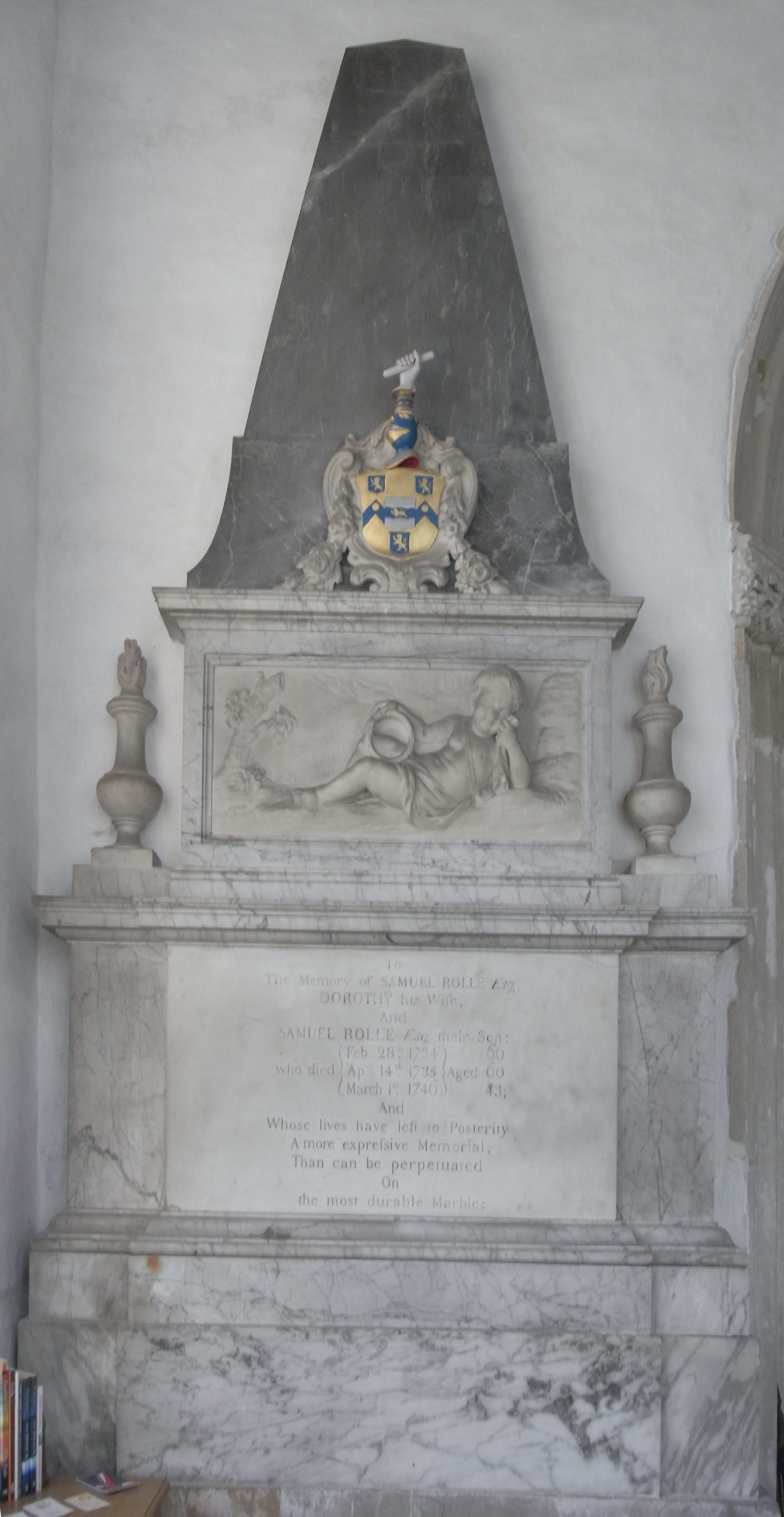
Rolle mural monument, Chittlehampton Church

Samuel I Rolle of Hudscott, MP for Barnstaple between 1705 and 1708 was a member of a cadet branch of the influential Rolle family of Stevenstone, near Great Torrington, Devon. He was the eldest son of Dennis Rolle of Great Torrington, a lawyer of the Inner Temple, a younger son of Sir Samuel Rolle (died 1647), of Heanton Satchville in the parish of Petrockstowe, Devon, MP, one of three distinguished grandsons (his brothers were Henry Rolle (died 1656) Chief Justice of the King's Bench & John Rolle (died 1648), MP) of Henry Rolle of Heanton Satchville, 4th son of the founder of the Devonshire Rolles, the Tudor lawyer and property speculator George Rolle (died 1552), MP, who purchased Stevenstone. The mother of Samuel I Rolle of Hudscott is stated by Vivian (1895) and by his biographer Cruickshanks to have been Jane Lovering "of Hudscott" which appears to place her as a daughter of John I Lovering (died 1675) by his wife Dorcas Doddridge and seems therefore to suggest that Samuel I Rolle's wife Dorothy Lovering (1675-1735) was his first cousin. Indeed by the time of Samuel's marriage to Dorothy in 1700 it was known that she was a co-heiress to Hudscott, her father having died in 1686 and her brothers before then. Dennis Rolle's elder brother was Robert Rolle (died 1660) of Heanton Satchville, MP, whose wife was Lady Arabella Clinton, co-heiress to the ancient Barony of Clinton. One of their daughters was Bridget Rolle, who brought the Barony of Clinton to her descendants by her husband Francis Trefusis of Trefusis in Cornwall. The last of the Rolles to own Hudscott was John Rolle, 1st Baron Rolle (died 1842), who married Louisa Trefusis (1794-1885), daughter of Robert George William Trefusis, 17th Baron Clinton (1764–1797). Lord Rolle having died childless, he selected as his heir his wife's nephew Hon. Mark Trefusis, who under the terms of the bequest adopted the name and arms of Rolle. (See further below).

The marriage settlement between Samuel I Rolle and Dorothy Lovering is recorded as follows:

Indenture dated 27 April 1700, between Samuel Rolle, of the Middle Temple, London, Esq., of one part; Dorothy Lovering, eldest daughter and one of the coheirs of John Lovering, late of Hudscott, Co. Devon, Esq., 2nd part; The Rt Hon. Hugh Boscawen, of Tregothnan; Samuel Rolle, of Heanton, Esq. (his first cousin Col. Samuel Rolle (1646-1719), MP, son of Robert Rolle of Heanton Satchville, Petrockstowe by his wife Lady Arabella Clinton); Nicholas Hooper, of Inner Temple, Esq.; Joseph Bailer, (Venner?) Barnstaple, gent.; Richard Parmynter, Barnstaple, merchant; and Thomas Nott, of Mariansleigh, gent, 3rd part. Whereas a marriage is intended to be solemnized between said Samuel Rolle and Dorothy Lovering, etc. Trustees named are enfeoffed of various lands of Samuel Rolle, and also of lands of Dorothy Lovering, viz. Manor of St. Peter Hays, in parish of St. Thomas, lands granted to Elizabeth Bailer (sic, should be "Venner"), mother of said Dorothy, for jointure, Higher Hudscott, Lower Hudscott, East Dennington, West Dennington, Lerwill, Row Park, Chappels Tenement, Whetstone, all in Chittlehampton; Chuggaton, Brealey's Tenement and Smallridge's in Swymbridge; messuages and closes in S. Molton, messuages in occupation of Richard Salisbury at Barnstaple; moiety of Huxhill Barton, Wear Giffard; moiety of Manor of Countisbury, in parishes of Countisbury and Linton, with all its royalties, rights, members, and appurtenances; moiety of N. Furshill, Lynton; moiety Radspry, Linton; one quarter of Spiranger, Linton; moiety of tenement in East Ilkerton, in possession of Alexander Reed, Lynton; moiety of Manor of Curry Revel; moiety of manor of Fivehead, and all other manors, lands, of Dorothy Lovering in Devon and Somerset in trust, etc., etc., etc. Children of marriage, etc.

==== Samuel II Rolle (1704-1747) ====
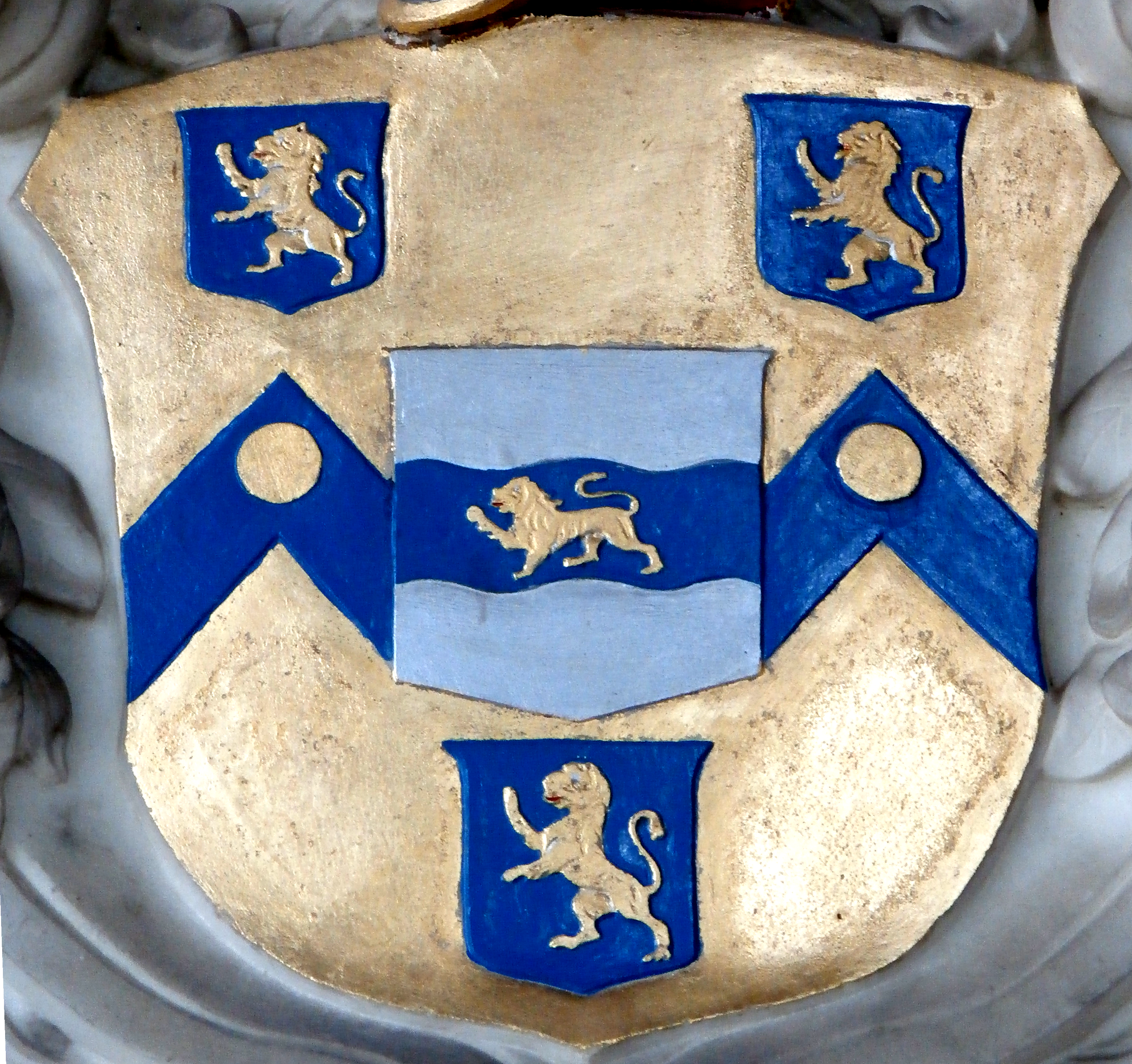
Arms of Samuel I Rolle with inescutcheon of Lovering. Detail from the Rolle monument in Chittlehampton Church

Samuel II Rolle (1704-1747), (only surviving son), MP for Barnstaple, who died without progeny and bequeathed his estates, including Hudscott, and the Lovering moiety in Countisbury, to his much wealthier distant cousin, Denys Rolle (1725–1797), MP, of Stevenstone. A monument to Samuel I and his wife and to Samuel II survives on the west wall of the south transept of Chittlehampton Church inscribed as follows:

"To the memory of Samuel Rolle, Esq., Dorothy his wife and Samuel Rolle Esq., their son, who died: Feb. 28th 1734 aged 66; Ap. 14th 1735 aged 60; March 1st 1746 aged 43. And whose lives have left to posterity a more expressive memorial than can be perpetuated on the most durable marble".

On the monument is shown an escutcheon with the arms of Rolle in the centre of which is an escutcheon of pretence with the arms of Lovering: Argent, on a fesse wavy azure a lion passant or, which signifies that Dorothy Lovering was an heiress. In 1737 Samuel II Rolle purchased the estate of Brightley, like Hudscott within the manor of Chittlehampton, from the executors of Caesar Giffard. The Giffards had acquired the lordship of the manor of Chittlehampton, and this too was acquired by Samuel II Rolle, and thus from 1737 Hudscott became the manor house of Chittlehampton.

==== Denys Rolle (1725–1797) ====
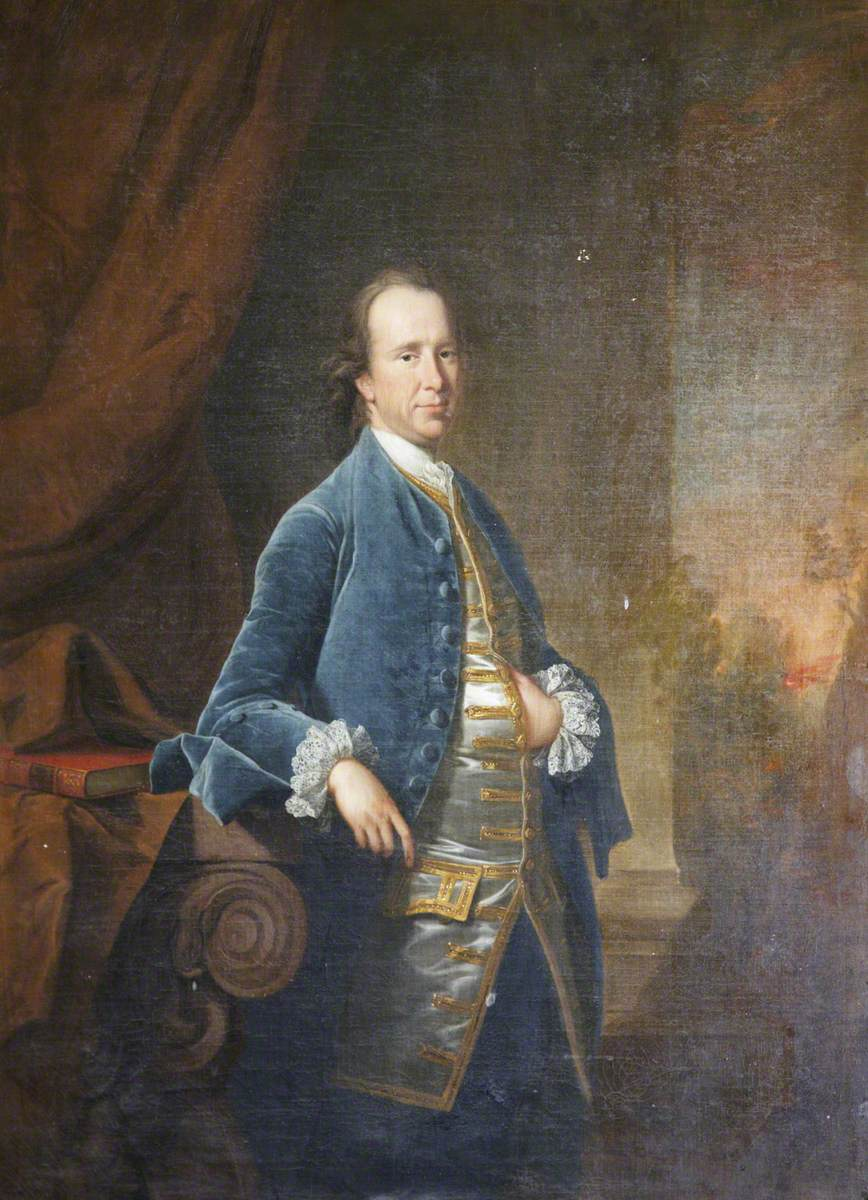
Portrait of Denys Rolle (1725–1797) by Thomas Hudson (1701–79). Collection of Great Torrington Almshouse, Town Lands and Poors Charities, formerly the property of Hon. Mark Rolle (died 1907) of Stevenstone and donated by his heir Lord Clinton. On display in Great Torrington Guildhall

Denys Rolle (1725–1797), MP, of Stevenstone, inherited Hudscott from his distant childless cousin Samuel Rolle (1704–1747). He was the 4th son of John Rolle (1679–1730), of Bicton and Stevenstone, and having three elder brothers it may have seemed unlikely in 1747 on the death of Samuel II Rolle that he would inherit the vast paternal Rolle estates. He resided at his manor of East Tytherley in Hampshire, and also at Hudscott, and all of his children were baptised at Chittlehampton. His son's 1772 marriage settlement stated: "Whereas a marriage hath been lately agreed upon between John Rolle the only son of Denys Rolle of Hudscott in the county of Devon, esquire, and Judith Maria Walrond..." But in 1779 following the death of the last surviving of his three elder brothers John Rolle Walter, he inherited the Rolle patrimony and became the largest landowner in Devon. He then had 5 seats at his disposal: Stevenstone and Beam, both near Great Torrington, Hudscott and Bicton near Exeter, all in Devon and East Tytherley in Hampshire. He died on 26 June 1797, aged 72, of angina during one of his habitual 8 mile walks between Hudscott and Stevenstone,

==== John Rolle, 1st Baron Rolle (1750-1842) ====
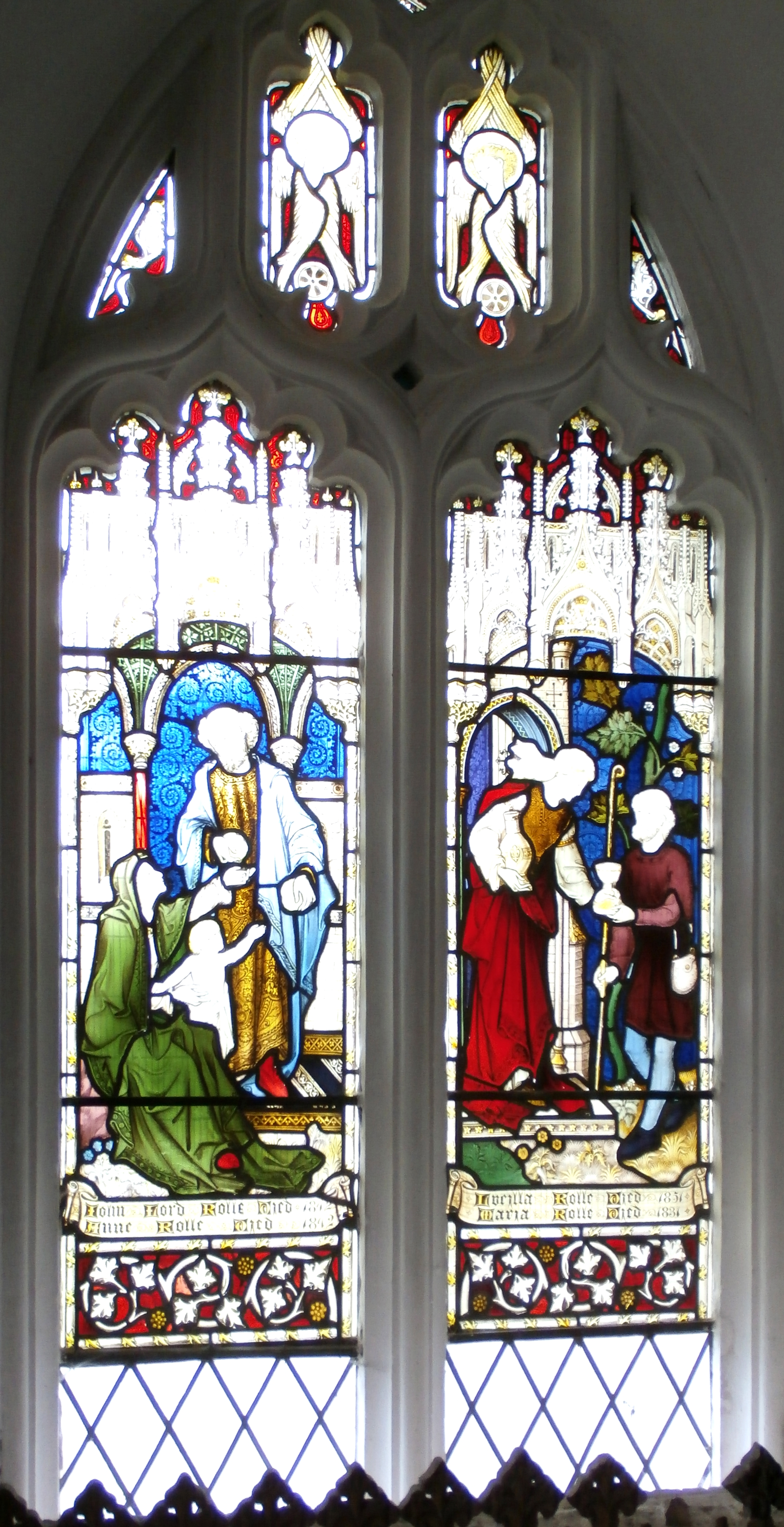
Rolle of Hudscott window, depicting biblical acts of charity, south chancel, St Hieritha's Church, Chittlehampton, made by Hardman & Co. Inscribed to Lord Rolle and his sisters:"John Lord Rolle died 1842; Anne Rolle died 1842; Lucilla Rolle died 1851; Maria Rolle died 1831"

John Rolle, 1st Baron Rolle(son). At the time of his death in 1842 he had provided Hudscott as a home for his two elderly spinster sisters Anne Rolle (died 1842) and Lucilla Rolle (died 1851), declared a lunatic in 1846. Lord Rolle's will stated:

"My said trustees shall and thereout keep up the establishment at Hudscott with the fields and lawn there now in the occupation of my said sisters and the establishment at the house and premises now occupied by my sisters in London with the same or the like number of servants and exactly the same manner and defray and discharge all the expenses of housekeeping and otherwise for my said sister Lucilla. And I particularly desire that Miss Ann Cutcliffe and Miss Harriet Cutcliffe will in case of my said sister Lucilla being the survivor of my said two sisters reside with my said sister Lucilla And I desire that the steward for the time being at Stevenstone shall pay into the hands of the said Zachary Hammett Drake .....out of the rents of my manor and lands at Hudscott such sum or sums of money as has or have been usually paid by him in order that the said ZHD may apply the same in the case afsd for the support and comfort of my said sister Lucilla and for the purpose of paying a compliment of one hundred pounds a year to each of them the said Ann and Harriet Cutcliffe so long as they shall respectively reside with my said sister Lucilla".

Ann Cutcliffe (1781-1859) and her sister Harriet Cutcliffe (1786-1867) were described in the census of 1851 concerning Hudscott as "resident gentlewomen", and were from the ancient gentry family of Cutcliffe of Damage, near Ilfracombe, Devon. They both died unmarried at their family's home Marwood Hill, Marwood, Devon, in which parish church survives their monument. Their sister Frances Cutcliffe (1780-1867) was the mother of Zachary Hammett Drake (died 1856), Rector of Clovelly and Lord Rolle's trustee relating to his sister Lucilla. On 10 and 11 September 1851, following the death of Lucilla Rolle, an auction was held at Hudscott of "farming stock, corn, hay, potatoes, implements in husbandry and other effects, the property of the late Miss Rolle"

=== Trefusis (Clinton) ===
- Hon. Mark Rolle (1835–1907) (heir, nephew of 2nd wife, born Hon. Mark Trefusis, adopted name and arms of Rolle by royal licence, as required by will of Lord Rolle)
- Charles John Robert Hepburn-Stuart-Forbes-Trefusis, 21st Baron Clinton (1863–1957), (heir male and nephew of Mark Rolle) of Huish. Lord Clinton left no son to inherit the title, but two daughters, who in 1958 disposed of a large part of the former Rolle estate, including the manor of Chittlehampton and Hudscott. Between these two daughters the title was abeyant until 1965:
  - Hon. Harriet Trefusis (14 November 1887 – 15 March 1958), married Maj. Henry Nevile Fane (1895 – 2 August 1947). They had seven children.
  - Hon. Fenella Trefusis (19 August 1889 – 19 July 1966), married Hon. John Bowes-Lyon. They had five children.
- Gerard Fane-Trefusis, 22nd Baron Clinton (born 1934), grandson of 21st Baron Clinton, son of Henry Nevile Fane by his wife Hon Harriet Trefusis.

== Tenants ==
Following the death of Lucilla Rolle in 1851, Hudscott was let by Mark Rolle, life tenant of the Rolle Estate, to tenants including:

=== William Thomas Hodgetts (Chambers) Hodgetts (d.1867) ===
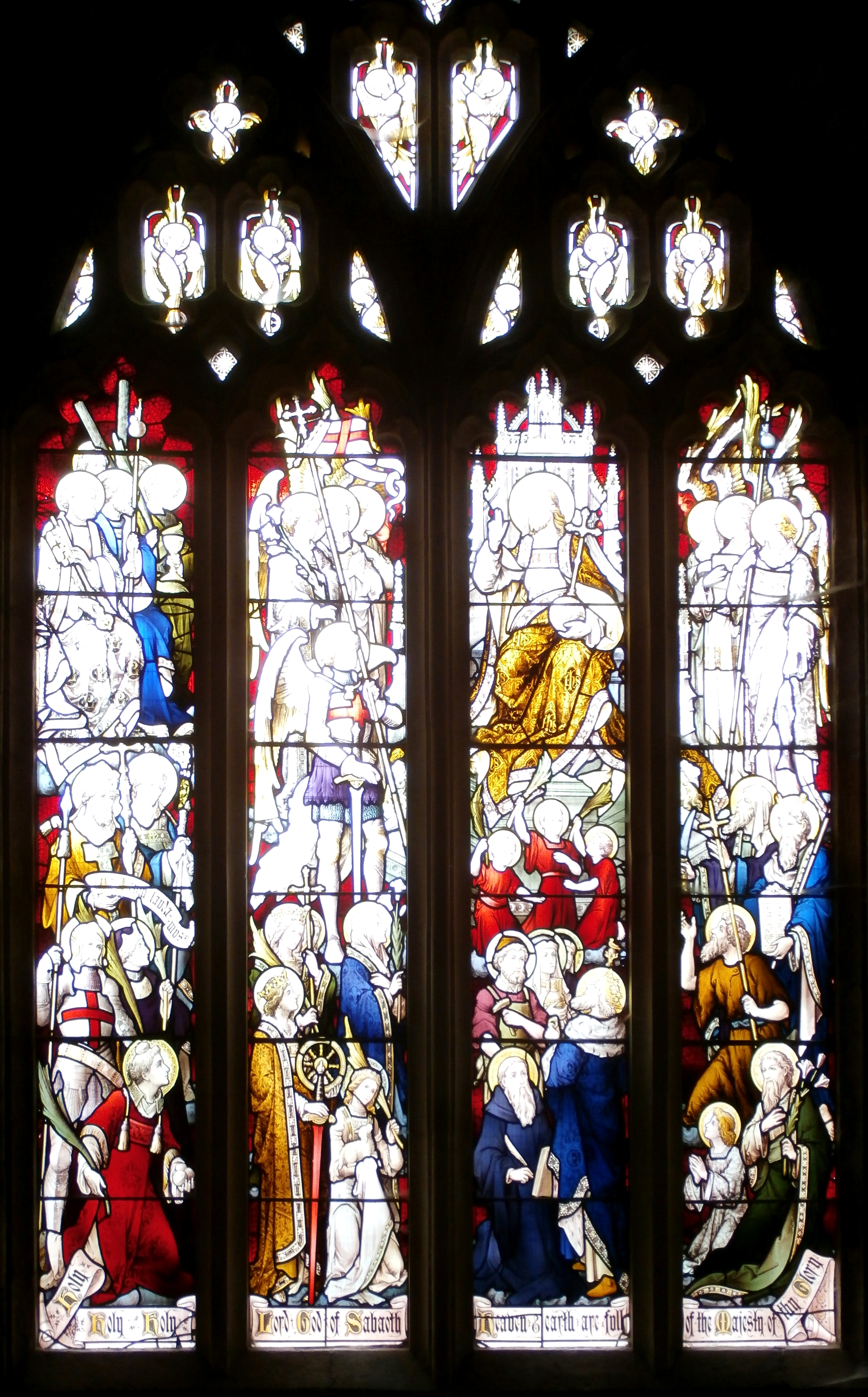
West window of Chittlehampton Church, made by Hardman, donated in 1893 by Mary Mabel Chambers Hodgetts in memory of her father William Thomas Hodgetts Hodgetts (d.1867) of Hudscott

William Thomas Hodgetts (Chambers) Hodgetts (d.1867) was in 1867 a member of the British Ornithologists' Union and died at Hudscott in 1867. His daughter Mary Mabel Chambers Hodgetts (who in 1871 had been an orphan and Ward of Chancery) in 1893 donated in his memory the west window of Chittlehampton Church which depicts Our Lord in Glory. A brass plaque in the church is inscribed as follows: "To the glory of God and in devoted memory of William Thomas Hodgetts Hodgetts only son of William Wylly Chambers, Captain RN, who died at Hudscott in this parish December 14th 1867. This window is dedicated by his only child Mary Mabel Chambers Hodgetts July 2nd 1893". He was baptised William Thomas Hodgetts Chambers, the son of Royal Navy Captain William Wylley Chambers by his wife Eliza Anne Hodgetts, daughter and sole heiress of Thomas Webb Hodgetts (d.1855) of Dudley and Elm Lodge, Hagley, Worcestershire. In compliance with the will of his maternal grandfather Thomas Webb Hodgetts, by royal licence dated 4 March 1867 he assumed the surname of Hodgetts in lieu of Chambers, and quartered the arms of Hodgetts with Chambers. In 1867 William Hodgetts also resided at Instow, Devon.

=== John Baring Short (1836-1880) ===
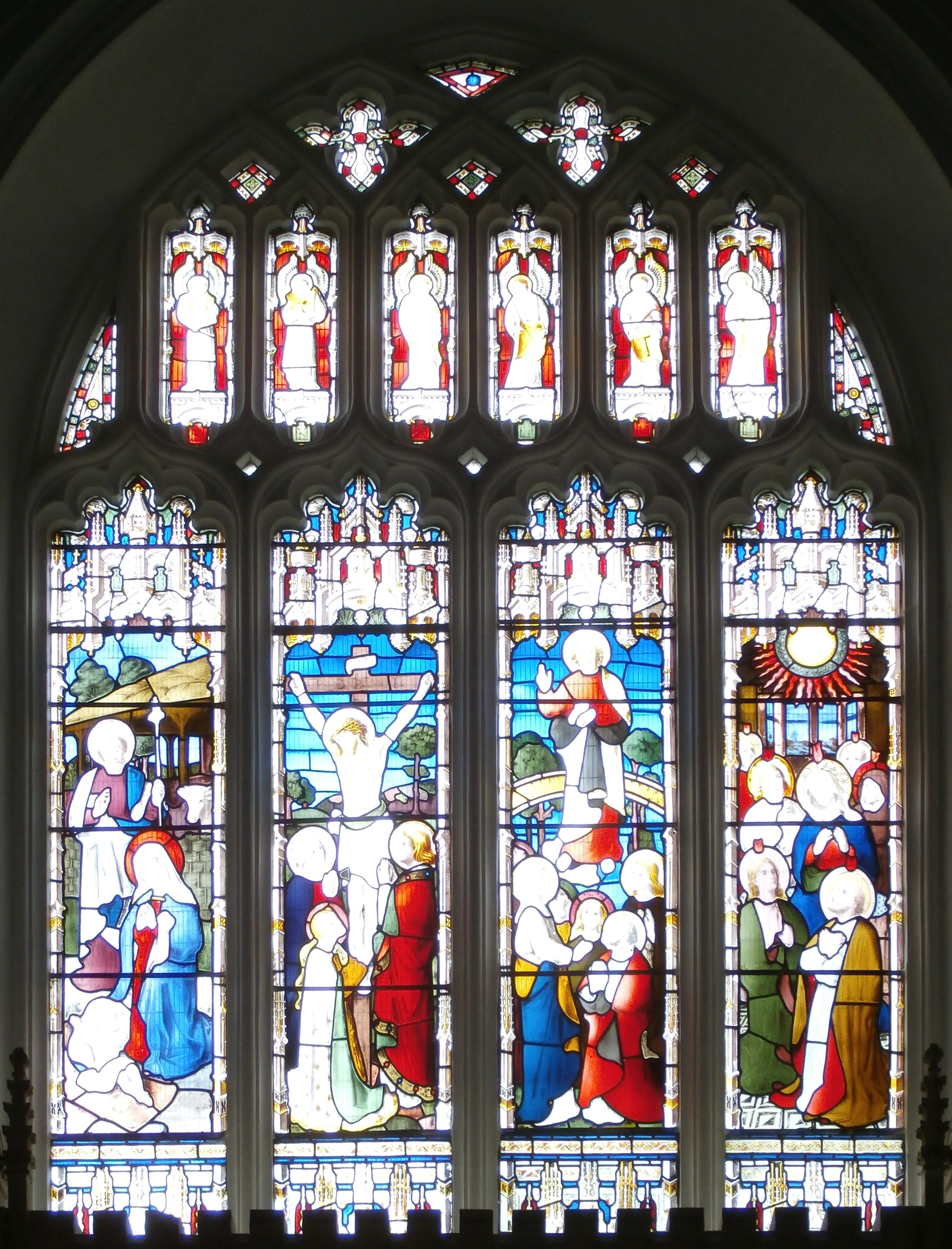
East window of Chittlehampton Church donated by John Baring Short of Hudscott and his wife Elizabeth Barry

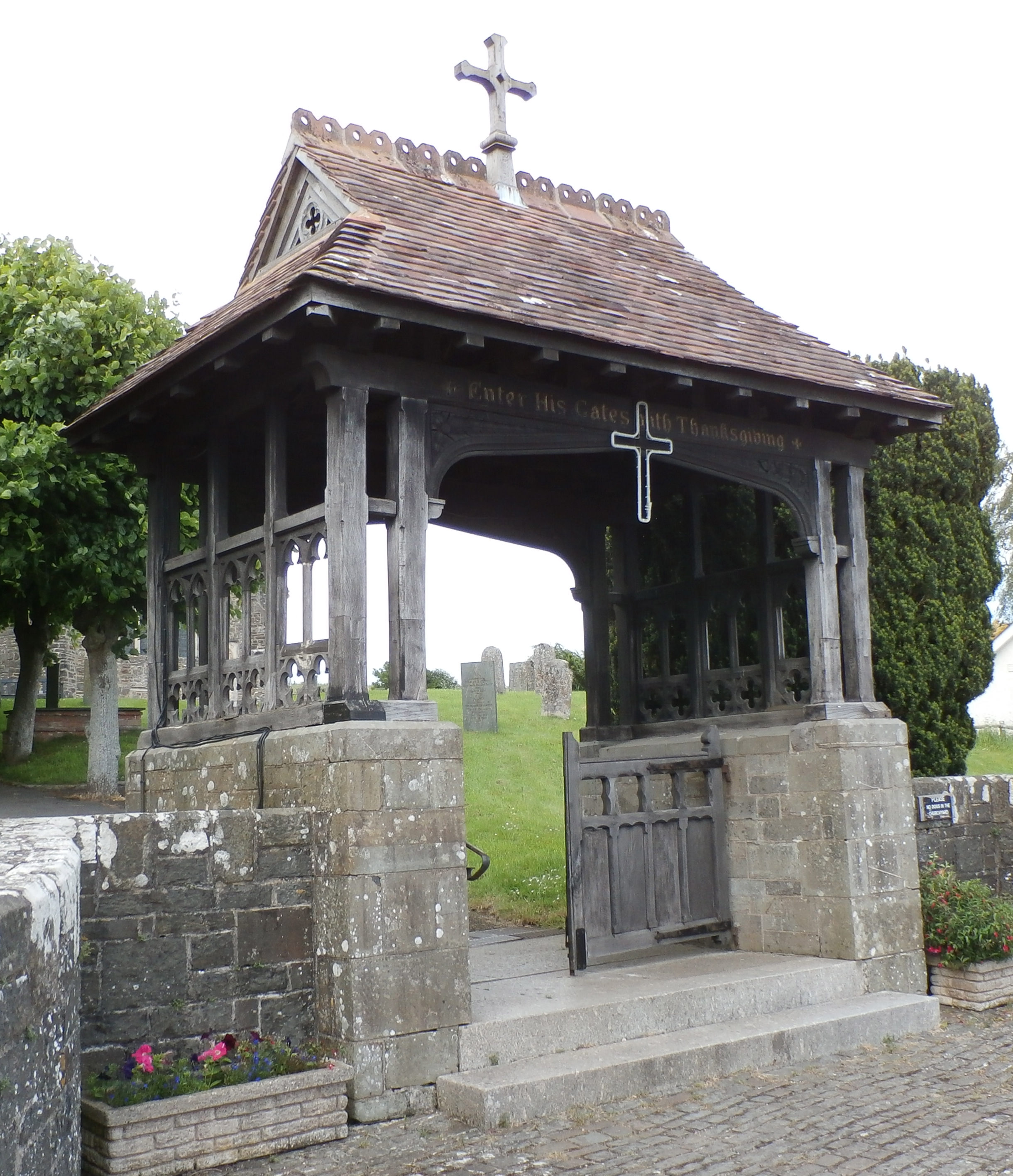
Lychgate, St Hieritha's Church, Chittlehampton, incorporating a small white marble plaque inscribed: "To the glory of God and in memory of John Baring Short, died at Hudscott Decr 10th 1880 aged 44 years"

The tenant of Hudscott in 1873 was John Baring Short, the son of Francis Baring Short of Bickham House, Kenn, near Exeter (by his wife Emily Lane), the younger son and heir of John Jeffrey Short (born 1753) and his wife Charlotte Baring (1763-1833), the youngest daughter of the banker John Baring (1730-1816) of Mount Radford, Exeter, who in partnership with his younger brother Sir Francis Baring, 1st Baronet (1740–1810), established the London merchant house of John and Francis Baring Company, which eventually became Barings Bank. The Short family was seated at Bickham House, Kenn near Exeter, built in the early 18th century by the Exeter lawyer John I Short, the father of John II Short "Senior", the latter who in 1744 was a partner in the Baring brothers' bank in Exeter and was the father of John Jeffrey Short (b.1753). The Short family held the shooting rights over the manors of Chittlehampton and adjacent Warkleigh and annually entertained the farmers within those manors to a luncheon and day of Rook shooting at the rookery at Hudscott. John Baring Short's widow, Elizabeth Barry (d.1930) was the only daughter of Major William Norton Barry of Castlecor, Kilbrin, County Cork, Ireland, and remarried to George Thorold (d.1932), of Warkleigh, and with him resumed occupation of Hudscott following the death in 1895 of its next tenant Arthur Fortescue. Elizabeth and her first husband donated the east window, dedicated to Elizabeth's father, to Chittlehampton Church, as evidenced by a brass plaque inscribed as follows: "To the glory of God and in memory of William Norton Barry of Castle Cor Co. Cork, Ireland, who died January 23 AD 1871 aged 57. This east window is dedicated by his only daughter Elizabeth and her husband John Baring Short of Hudscott"

=== Arthur Fortescue (1858-1895) ===
Arthur Granville Fortescue was born in Madeira, the 4th son of Hugh Fortescue, 3rd Earl of Devon of Castle Hill, Filleigh, Devon. In 1886, he married (Lilla) Gertrude Fane (born 1859), 3rd daughter of Frederick Fane of Moyles Court, Rockford, Hampshire. He was a captain in the Coldstream Guards and died at Hudscott aged 37 on 3 October 1895. He was buried at Filleigh. He was the president and founder of the Chittlehampton Working Men's Club. The census of 1891 for Hudscott lists his household to contain his wife, eldest son Grenville Fortescue (born 1887) and eight servants. A brass plaque survives in the bell-tower of Chittlehampton Church inscribed: "In memory of Arthur Grenville Fortescue 4th son of Hugh 3rd Earl Fortescue. A Captain in the Coldstream Guards. Born 24th Decr 1858. Died at Hudscott 3rd Octr 1895. This brass is placed here by his wife in the year of our Lord God 1896. Grace, Mercy and Peace"

=== George Thorold (1847-1932) ===
George Aubrey William Thorold was the tenant of Hudscott in 1901 until his death in 1932. His wife Elizabeth Barry (d.1930) (daughter of Major William Norton Barry of Castlecor, Kilbrin, County Cork, Ireland) was the widow of John Baring Short (d.1880), the tenant of Hudscott before Arthur Fortescue. He was the son of Rev. William Thorold, Rector and Patron of Warkleigh, which parish is adjacent to the south of Hudscott, himself the grandson of Sir John Thorold, 9th Baronet, MP for Lincolnshire of Syston Park, near South Kesteven, Lincolnshire. In 1843 Rev. William Thorold built as a rectory and family house Warkleigh House, to the design of Abbott of Barnstaple. George Thorold was the owner of the Warkleigh House estate and of several freehold properties within the parishes of Warkleigh and adjoining Satterleigh. He died 9 February 1932, without progeny. He married (Frances) Elizabeth Gould, born 1842 in Ireland. By coincidence his butler, to whom he bequeathed £400 in his will, was called George Dodderidge, born in 1869 at Crowcombe, Somerset. George Thorold was a solicitor and a keen sportsman. He was a JP for Devon and was governor of West Buckland School and was president of the Umberleigh Fat Stock Show. He left an estate valued at his death at £101,389 gross. Following his death an auction was held by Messrs Cockram, Dobbs and Stagg to dispose of his furniture from Hudscott, in 1,300 lots.

== Sources ==
- Andrews, Rev. J.H.B., (Vicar of Chittlehampton & Prebendary of Exeter Cathedral), Chittlehampton Parish Magazine, various volumes.
- Andrews, Rev. J.H.B., "Chittlehampton", published 1962 in vol.94, pp. 233–338, of Transactions of the Devon...Society
- Vivian, Lt.Col. J.L., (Ed.) The Visitations of the County of Devon: Comprising the Heralds' Visitations of 1531, 1564 & 1620, Exeter, 1895
- Chanter, Rev. J.F., The Parishes of Lynton & Countisbury, published in Report & Transactions of the Devonshire Association for the Advancement of Science, Literature & Art, Vol.38, Lynton, 1906, pp.246-7
- Cruickshanks, Eveline, biography of Samuel Rolle (1669-1735), published in History of Parliament: House of Commons 1690-1715
