= Samuel Rolle (1669–1735) =

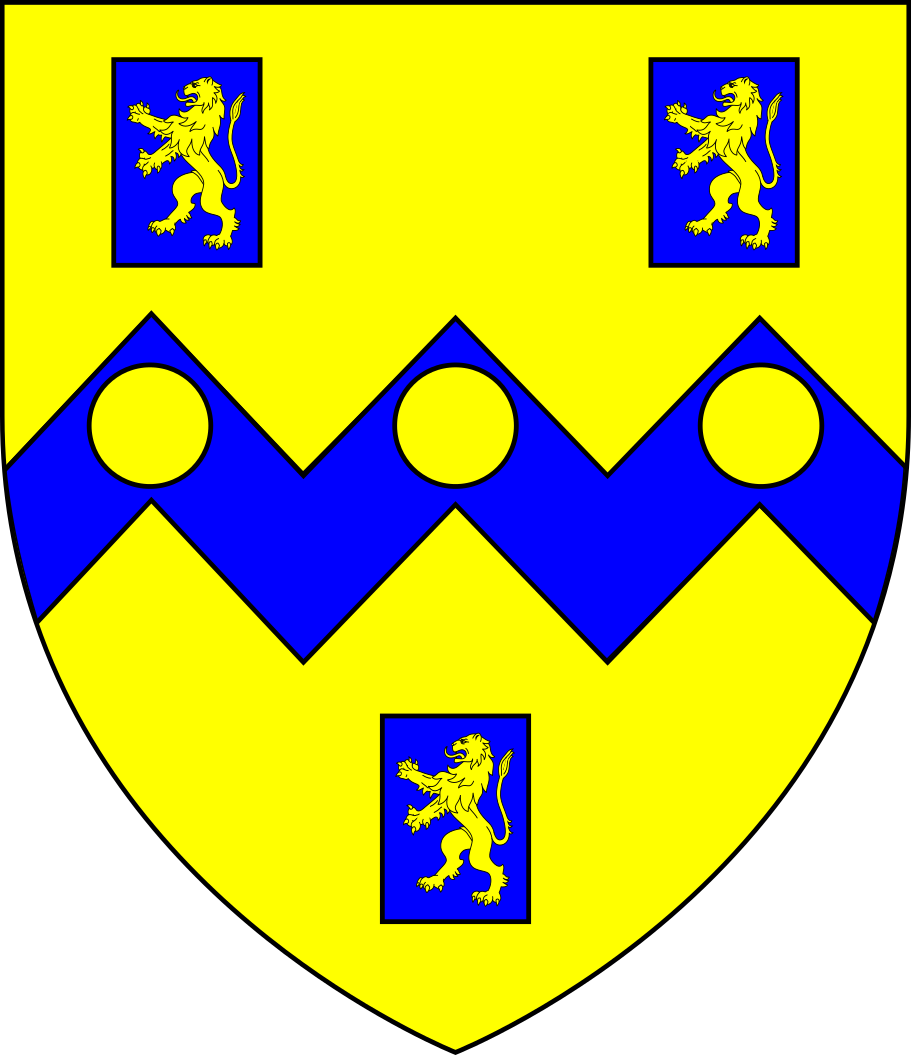
Arms of Rolle: Or, on a fesse dancetté between three billets azure each charged with a lion rampant of the first three bezants

Samuel Rolle (1669-1735) of Hudscott, Chittlehampton, Devon, was MP for Barnstaple between 1705 and 1708. He was a member of a cadet branch of the influential Rolle family of Stevenstone.

== Origins ==
He was the son of Dennis Rolle (d.1671) of Great Torrington, a lawyer of the Inner Temple, son of Sir Samuel Rolle (d.1647), MP, one of three distinguished grandsons (his brothers were Henry Rolle (d.1656) Chief Justice of the King's Bench & John Rolle (d.1648), MP) of Henry Rolle of Heanton Satchville, Petrockstowe, 4th son of the founder of the Devonshire Rolles, George Rolle (d.1552), MP, of Stevenstone. His elder brother was Robert Rolle (d.1660), MP, whose wife was Lady Arabella Clinton, co-heiress to the ancient Barony of Clinton.

== Education ==
He entered Exeter College, Oxford on 16 July 1687 and obtained the degree of BA in 1691. He trained as a lawyer in the Middle Temple which he entered in 1689 and was called to the bar in 1697.

== Marriage ==
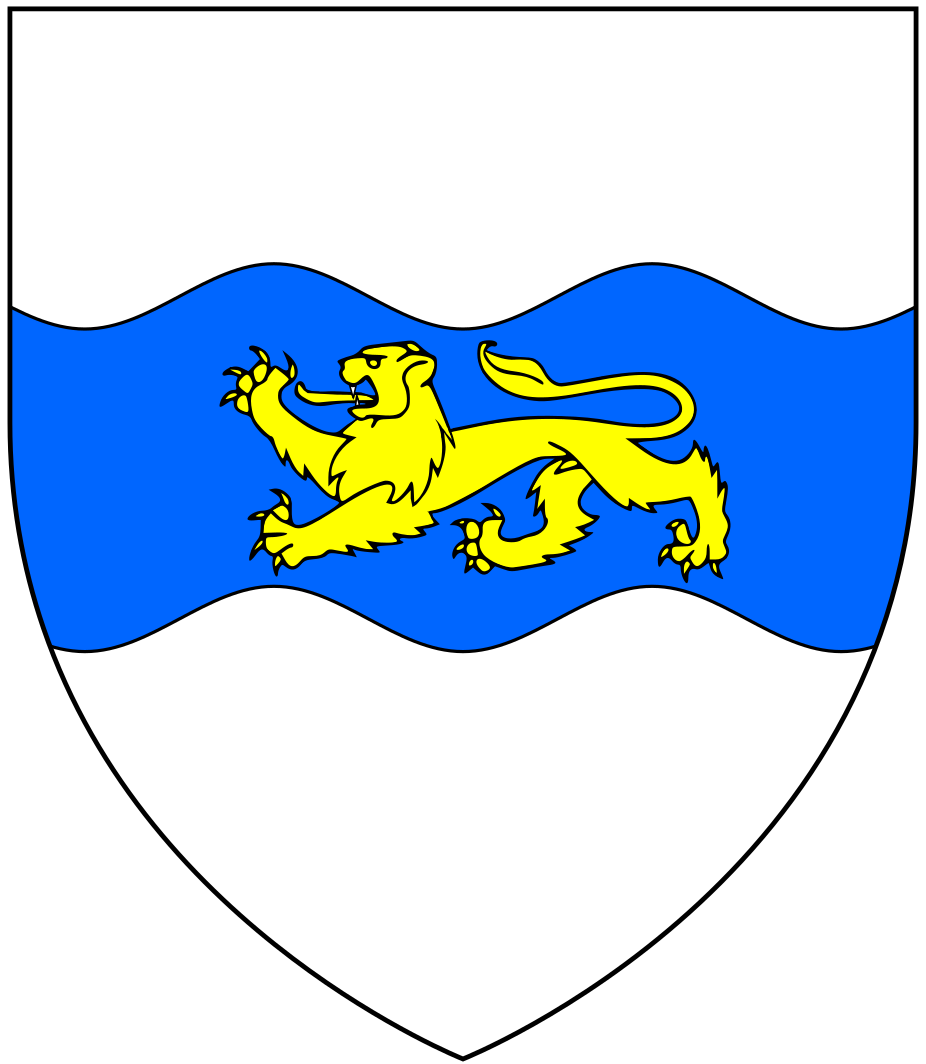
Arms of Lovering of Hudscott, Chittlehampton, as seen on Rolle mural monument, as escutcheon of pretence, Chittlehampton Church: Argent, on a fesse wavy azure a lion passant or

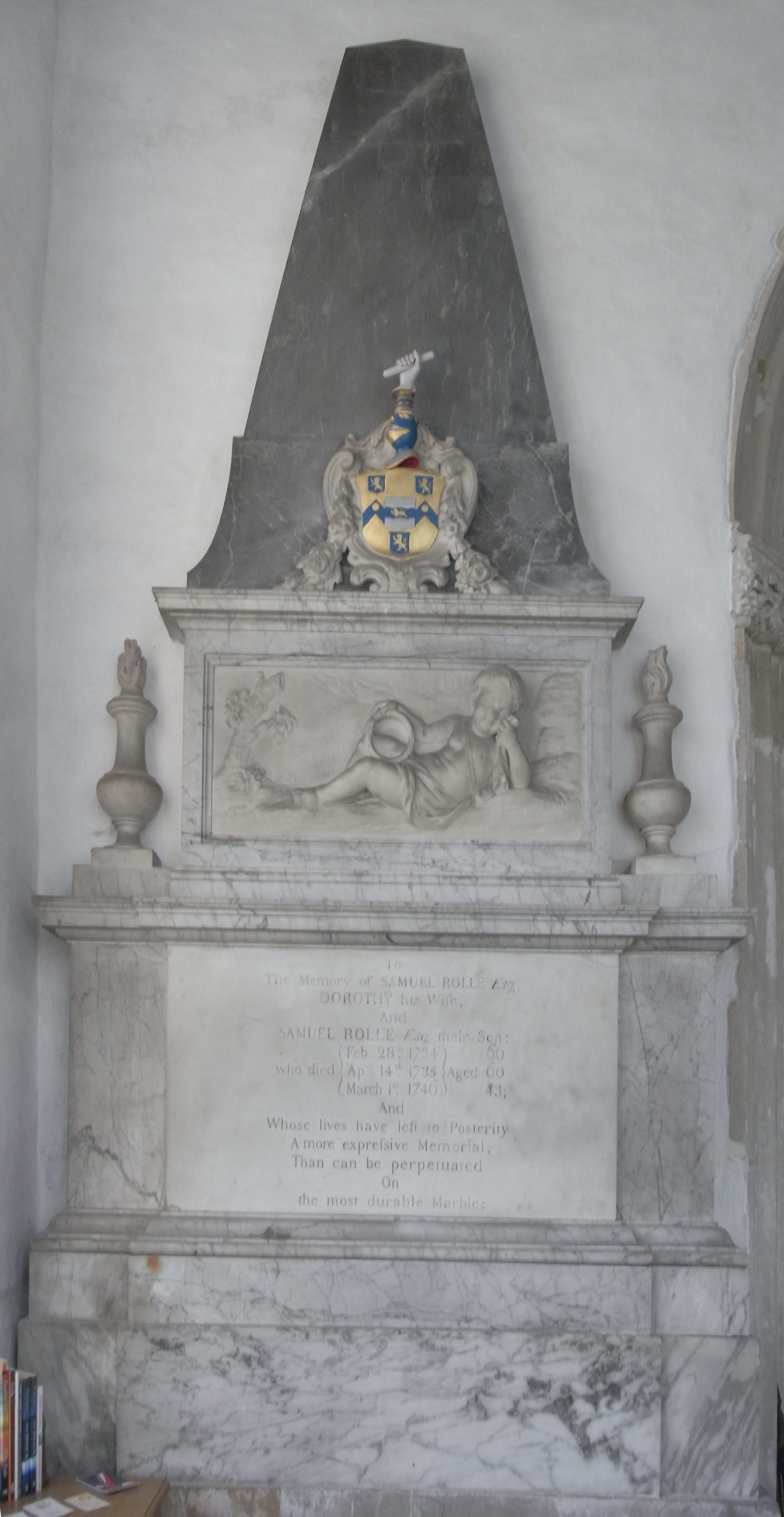
Rolle mural monument, Chittlehampton Church

He married Dorothy Lovering (d.1735), daughter and co-heiress of John Lovering of Hudscott, Chittlehampton, a merchant of Barnstaple, Devon. The marriage settlement is recorded as follows:

"Indenture dated 27 April 1700, between Samuel Rolle, of the Middle Temple, London, Esq., of one part; Dorothy Lovering, eldest daughter and one of the coheirs of John Lovering, late of Hudscott, Co. Devon, Esq., 2nd part; Rt. Hon. Hugh Boscawen, of Tregothnan; Samuel Rolle, of Heanton, Esq. (his first cousin Col. Samuel Rolle (1646-1719), MP, son of Robert Rolle of Heanton Satchville, Petrockstowe by his wife Lady Arabella Clinton); Nicholas Hooper, of Inner Temple, Esq.; Joseph Bailer, (Venner?) Barnstaple, gent.; Richard Parmynter, Barnstaple, merchant; and Thomas Nott, of Mariansleigh, gent, 3rd part. Whereas a marriage is intended to be solemnized between said Samuel Rolle and Dorothy Lovering, etc. Trustees named are enfeoffed of various lands of Samuel Rolle, and also of lands of Dorothy Lovering, viz. Manor of St. Peter Hays, in parish of St. Thomas, lands granted to Elizabeth Bailer (sic, should be "Venner"), mother of said Dorothy, for jointure, Higher Hudscott, Lower Hudscott, East Dennington, West Dennington, Lerwill, Row Park, Chappels Tenement, Whetstone, all in Chittlehampton; Chuggaton, Brealey's Tenement and Smallridge's in Swymbridge; messuages and closes in S. Molton, messuages in occupation of Richard Salisbury at Barnstaple; moiety of Huxhill Barton, Wear Giffard; moiety of Manor of Countisbury, in parishes of Countisbury and Linton, with all its royalties, rights, members, and appurtenances; moiety of N. Furshill, Lynton; moiety Radspry, Linton; one quarter of Spiranger, Linton; moiety of tenement in East Ilkerton, in possession of Alexander Reed, Lynton; moiety of Manor of Curry Revel; moiety of manor of Fivehead, and all other manors, lands, of Dorothy Lovering in Devon and Somerset in trust, etc., etc., etc. Children of marriage, etc."

John Lovering (d.1686) was the son of John Lovering (d.1675) a merchant of Weare Giffard by his wife Dorcas Doddridge, sister and co-heiress of John Doddridge (d.1666), MP, of Bremridge, South Molton. John Lovering the son was also a merchant of Barnstaple, who in 1679/80 purchased from John Wichehalse of Ley (now Lee Abbey) in the parish of Lynmouth, and of Chard, the manors of Lynton and Countisbury. He is described in the conveyance indenture dated 24 May 1680 as of Weare Giffard. His residence there appears to have been at Huxhill Barton. He married Elizabeth Venner the only surviving daughter of William Venner of Hudscott who was the uncle of John Wichehalse. He also purchased in 1645 from Adam Lugg of Barnstaple the manor of East Ilkerton and a moiety of Sparhanger, Radispray and North Fursehill. His two sons John Lovering and Venner Lovering predeceased him without children and he left two daughters as his co-heiresses, Dorothy Lovering, the wife of Samuel Rolle and Susanna Lovering, who married Richard Acland (1679-1729), MP, of Fremington House, Fremington, who succeeded Samuel Rolle as MP for Barnstaple. The large and grand red brick mansion of Fremington House displays two escutcheons showing the arms of Acland impaling Lovering. John Lovering appears to have been an exporter of herring fish to Spain, as the following recorded lawsuit of 1658 suggests: "John Martin v. John Lovering: Consignment of fish to St. Lucar or Seville in Spain. Touching a former suit also.: Devon; Spain".

He is mentioned in the historical romance Lorna Doone (1869) by Richard Doddridge Blackmore as follows:

"And it is a very grievous thing, which touches small landowners, to see an ancient family day by day decaying: and when we heard that Ley Barton itself, and all the Manor of Lynton were under a heavy mortgage debt to John Lovering of Weare-Gifford, there was not much, in our little way, that we would not gladly do or suffer for the benefit of De Whichehalse".

Chanter (1906) states the account in Lorna Doone to be confused.

Hugh Boscawen (1625-1701), of Tregothnan, then MP for Cornwall, was the first cousin of Rolle's father, being the second son of Hugh Boscawen of Tregothnan by his wife Margaret Rolle, daughter of Robert Rolle (d.1633) of Heanton Satchville. The Boscawen family was one of the richest and most influential in Cornwall, with extensive mining interests. He was the husband of Lady Margaret Clinton, the eldest of the two co-heiresses to the Barony of Clinton, the younger of which, Lady Arabella Clinton, had married Samuel Rolle's uncle Robert Rolle (d.1660), MP.

== Children ==
He had two daughters and two sons, one who predeceased him. Samuel Rolle (1704-1747), his only surviving son who died childless, bequeathed his estates including Hudscott and the Lovering moiety in Countisbury to his much wealthier cousin, Denys Rolle (1725-1797), MP, of Stevenstone, who sold all his Countisbury lands in parts and parcels chiefly to the occupying tenants, East Lynmouth being sold in 1759 to Peter Hooper, and the rest at various dates up to 1782.

== Death and burial ==
He died on 28 February 1735 and was buried at Chittlehampton, in which church exists a mural monument, on the west wall of the south transept, inscribed as follows:

"To the memory of Samuel Rolle, Esq., Dorothy his wife and Samuel Rolle Esq., their son, who died: Feb. 28th 1734 aged 66; Ap. 14th 1735 aged 60; March 1st 1746 aged 43. And whose lives have left to posterity a more expressive memorial than can be perpetuated on the most durable marble".

On the monument is shown an escutcheon with the arms of Rolle in the centre of which is an escutcheon of pretence with the arms of Lovering: Argent, on a fesse wavy azure a lion passant or, which signifies that Dorothy Lovering was an heiress.

The tomb was sculpted by Peter Scheemakers.

== Sources ==
- Chanter, Rev. J.F., The Parishes of Lynton & Countisbury, published in Report & Transactions of the Devonshire Association for the Advancement of Science, Literature & Art, Vol.38, Lynton, 1906, pp.246-7
- Cruickshanks, Eveline, biography of Samuel Rolle (1669-1735), published in History of Parliament: House of Commons 1690-1715
