= Baggy Sandstones =

Geological formation in England

- Stratigraphic range: Devonian
- Type: Formation

Lithology
- Primary: Sandstone

Location
- Region: Devon, England
- Country: United Kingdom

The Baggy Sandstones is a geological formation in England. It preserves fossils dating back to the Devonian period. It is part of the Exmoor Group.

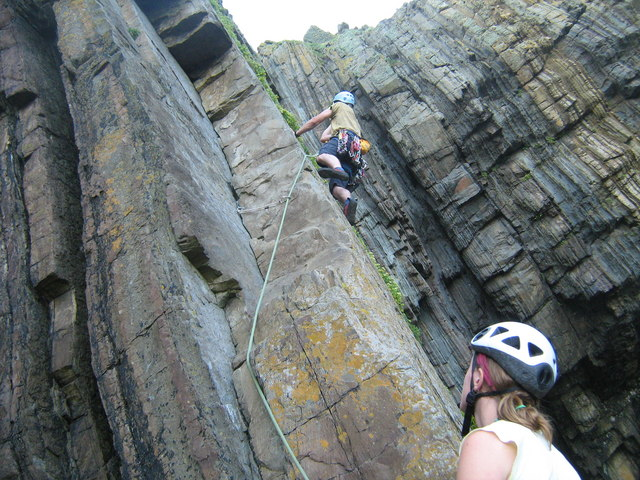
Climbers on the Baggy Sandstone at Baggy Point

The Baggy Sandstones form the headland of Baggy Point and the faulted outcrop stretches away to the east north of Croyde, through Knowle to Stoke Rivers and Brayford. Its outcrop wraps around a syncline/anticline fold pair in a reverse-S shape via East Buckland and parallels the outcrop of the Upcott Slates east to Dulverton. It is mapped as a distinguishable unit of the Exmoor Group as far as the Batherm valley, east of Skilgate. The formation consists of sandstones, siltstones and shales including some feldspar and mica rich units, variously of marine through brackish to freshwater origin. The outcrop forms a small yet prominent ridge along its outcrop.

== See also ==
- List of fossiliferous stratigraphic units in England
