= Porlock Stone Circle =

Neolithic stone circle in Somerset, England

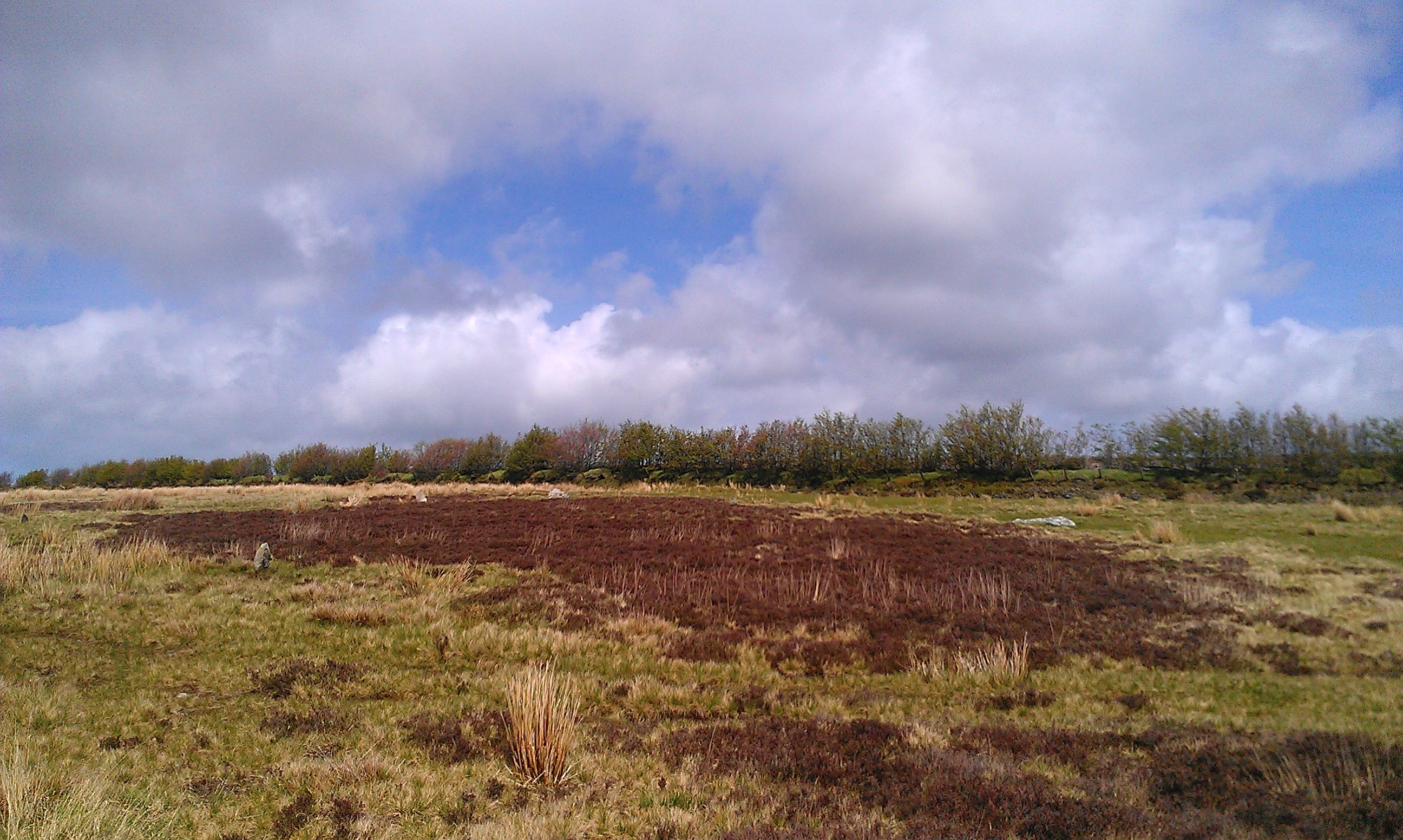
- The location of the circle in 2014; the stones are so small that discerning the site is difficult

- Location within Somerset
- 51°11′22″N 3°39′14″W
- Type: Stone circle
- Periods: Neolithic/Bronze Age
- Location: Porlock

Scheduled monument
- Official name: Stone circle, Porlock Common
- Reference no.: 1006189

Porlock Stone Circle is a stone circle located on Exmoor, near the village of Porlock in the south-western English county of Somerset. The Porlock ring is part of a tradition of stone circle construction that spread throughout much of Britain, Ireland, and Brittany during the Late Neolithic and Early Bronze Age, over a period between 3300 and 900 BCE. The purpose of such monuments is unknown, although archaeologists speculate that the stones represented supernatural entities for the circles' builders.

Although Exmoor witnessed the construction of many monuments during the Bronze Age, only two stone circles survive in this area, the other being Withypool Stone Circle. The Porlock circle is about 24 metres (79 feet) in diameter and contains thirteen green micaceous sandstone rocks; there may originally have been more. Directly to the north-east of the circle is a cairn connected to a linear stone row. No evidence has been found that allows for absolute dating of the monument's construction, although archaeologists have suggested that the cairn dates from the Early Bronze Age, the circle being a Middle Bronze Age addition.

A small lead wheel found inside Porlock Stone Circle suggests that the site was visited during the Romano-British period. The site was rediscovered in the 1920s and since then a variety of stones have been added to it; its current appearance is a composite of prehistoric and modern elements. In 1928 the site was surveyed and excavated by the archaeologist Harold St George Gray. A second excavation took place under the leadership of Mark Gillings in 2013.

== Location ==
The circle is located 4.5 kilometres (2 3/4 mi) south-west of the village of Porlock, in the south-western English county of Somerset. It is 1.5 kilometres (1 mi) south of the A39 road and is immediately to the west of the lane headed south to Exford. The ring is at an altitude of almost 415 metres (1,362 feet) above sea level, and is positioned 10 kilometres (6 mi) north of the Withypool Stone Circle.

The land on which the circle is located slopes from the north-east to the south-west. From the circle, a range of different Bronze Age round barrows, or tumuli, are visible at different points in the surrounding landscape. Among the nearest are Alderman's Barrow, Black Barrow, the two Bendels Barrows, the Rowbarrows, and the Kit Barrows. On the east-northeast side of the circle is the Berry Castle earthwork camp, which dates from the Late Iron Age or Romano-British period.

== Context ==
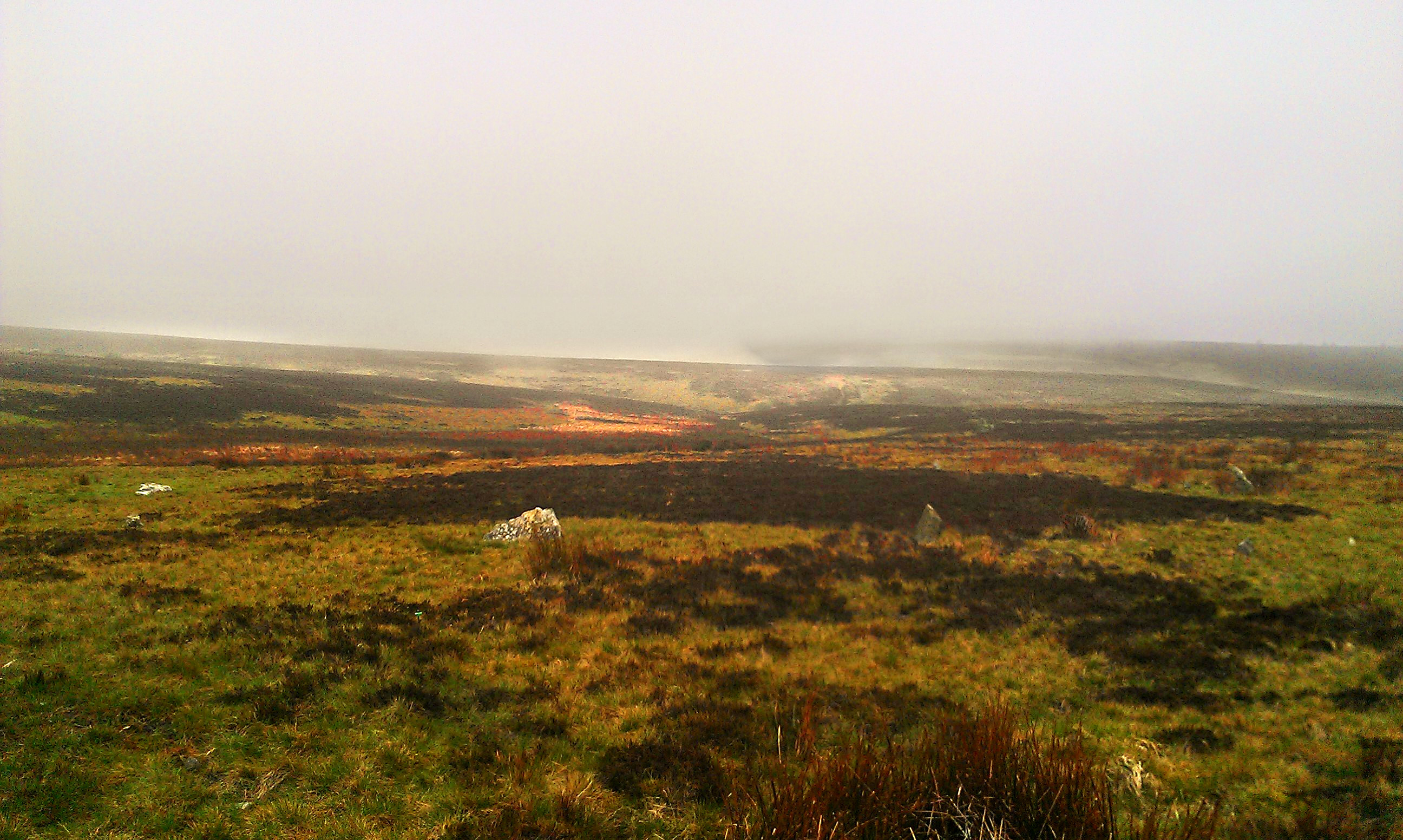
The circle, photographed in 2014

While the transition from the Early Neolithic to the Late Neolithic in the fourth and third millennia BCE saw much economic and technological continuity, there was a considerable change in the style of monuments erected, particularly in what is now southern and eastern England. By 3000 BCE, the long barrows, causewayed enclosures, and cursuses that had predominated in the Early Neolithic were no longer built and had been replaced by circular monuments of various kinds. These include earthen henges, timber circles, and stone circles. Stone circles are found in most areas of Britain where stone is available, except for the island's south-eastern corner. They are most densely concentrated in south-western England and on the north-eastern horn of Scotland, near Aberdeen. The tradition of their construction may have lasted for 2,400 years, from 3300 to 900 BCE, with the major building phase taking place between 3000 and 1,300 BCE.

These stone circles typically show very little evidence of human visitation during the period immediately following their creation. This suggests that they were not sites used for rituals that left archaeologically visible evidence, but may have been deliberately left as "silent and empty monuments". The archaeologist Mike Parker Pearson suggested that in Neolithic Britain, stone was associated with the dead, and wood with the living. Other archaeologists have suggested that the stone might not represent ancestors, but rather other supernatural entities, such as deities.

=== Stone circles in Exmoor ===
There are only two known prehistoric stone circles on Exmoor: Porlock and Withypool Stone Circle. The archaeologist Leslie Grinsell suggested that the circular stone monument on Almsworthy Common was "probably" the remains of a stone circle, although more recent assessments regard it as one of the stone settings, a different type of monument more common across Exmoor.

Archaeologists have dated these circles to the Late Neolithic or Early Bronze Age, and have noted that they are comparable to the stone circles found further south, on Dartmoor. In contrast to the two known Exmoor circles, over seventy such monuments have been identified on Dartmoor. This may be because Exmoor, unlike Dartmoor, has no natural granite. Instead, it has Devonian slates and Hangman Grits, both of which easily break up into small slabs, resulting in a general shortage of big stones on Exmoor.

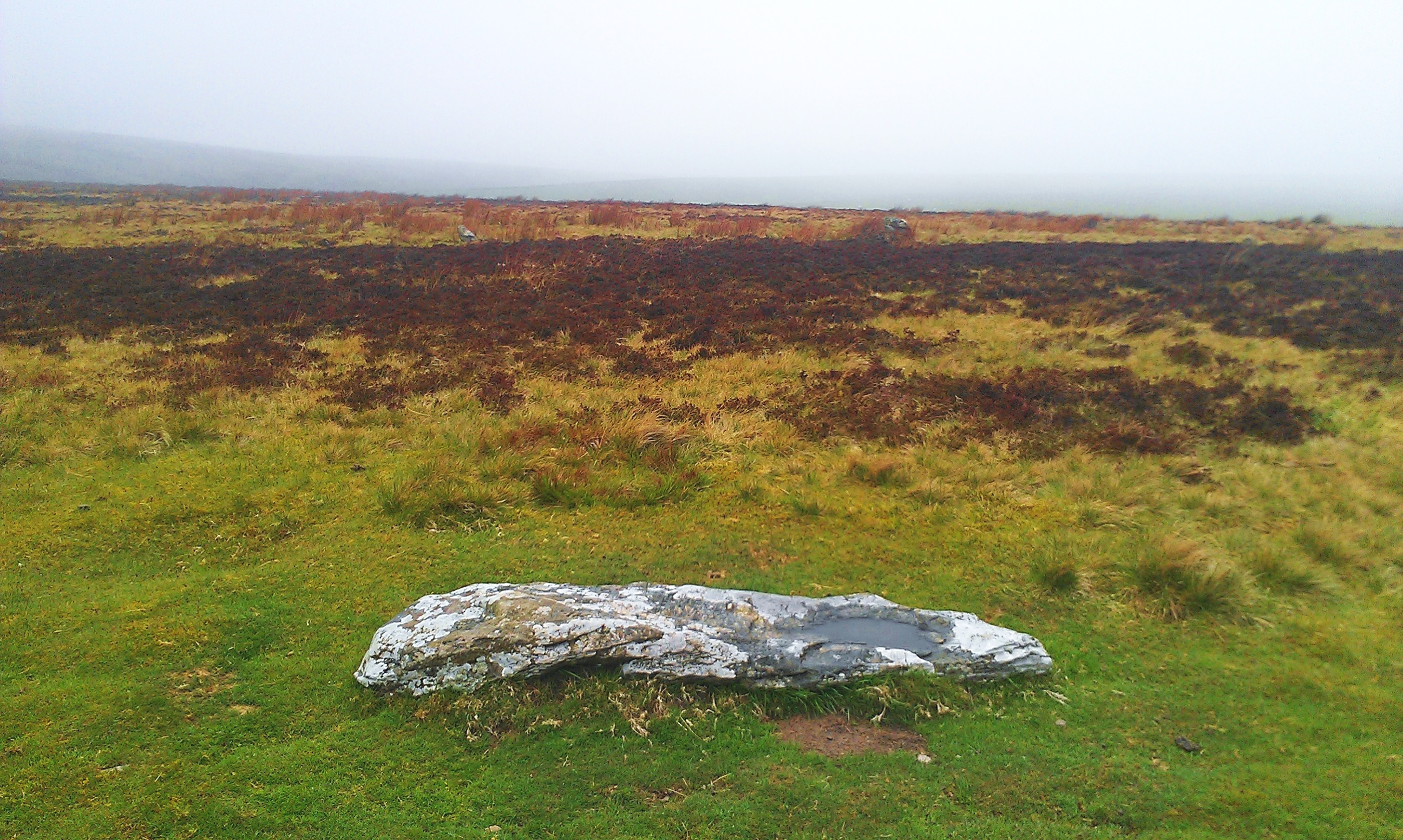
Detail of the circle

This scarcity of large stones may explain why Neolithic and Bronze Age communities used small stones, termed miniliths, in the two Exmoor circles and other monuments within the region. There are nevertheless other constructions in the area, such as the clapper bridge at Tarr Steps and the three-metre Long Stone at Challacombe, which do use locally sourced large megaliths. This suggests that larger stones would have been available had the sites' builders desired and that the use of miniliths was therefore deliberate.

Exmoor also has a henge, near Parracombe, although it has been damaged by ploughing. Alongside this, the moor bears a profusion of other Bronze Age monuments, including between 300 and 400 round barrows, standing stones, linear stone rows, and stone settings. The creation of these different monument types might also explain why so few stone circles were created here. Most of the surviving prehistoric stone monuments on Exmoor are located on those areas of moorland outside the limits of medieval and post-medieval agriculture. For this reason it is likely that the surviving sites are not a reliable indicator of their original extent.

== Description ==
Porlock Stone Circle has a diameter of 24 metres (79 feet) and a circumference of approximately 77 metres (253 feet). The stones in the circle are green micaceous sandstone originating from the Devonian period and were probably collected in the local area. Following his excavation of several stone settings, the archaeologist Mark Gillings argued that three forms of stone were deliberately incorporated into the circle: small uprights, low uprights, and larger stones that are positioned in a sloping position. Most of the latter were thin wedges that had been deliberately selected for their shape or flaked to give them a tapering form. Commenting on those cases where the majority of the stone is below ground rather than protruding from it, Gillings suggested that such positioning may reflect a "deliberate inversion of the upright stone ideal". This concept of inversion is also evident at contemporary sites like the Holme timber circle in Norfolk and, according to Gillings, might reflect "a strong chthonic element" to Porlock Stone Circle.

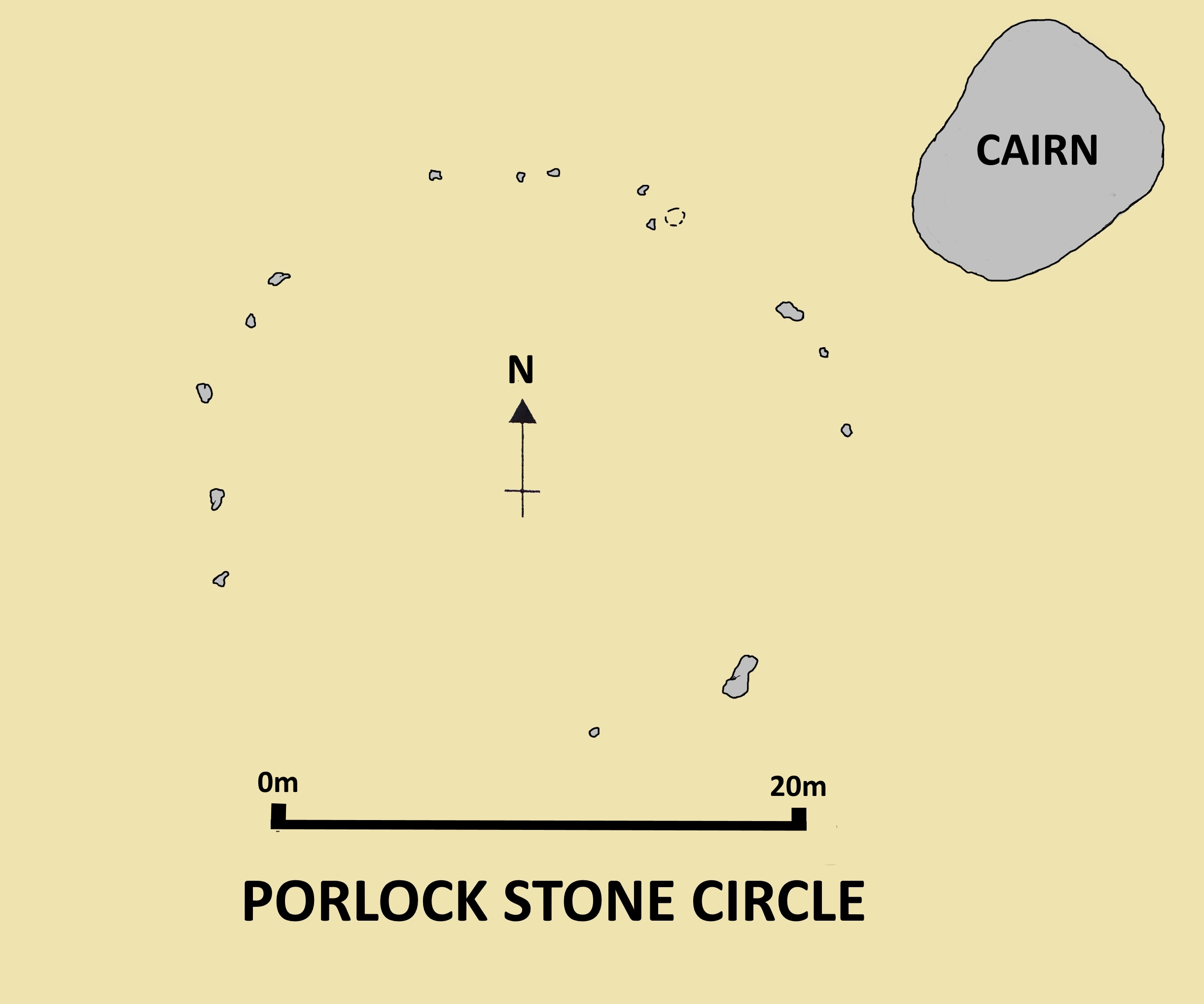
Map of Porlock Stone Circle

Investigation in the 1920s found ten upright stones and eleven prostrate ones, and concluded that there would have probably been about forty-three stones in the circle, each spaced about two metres (6.6 feet) apart. The largest gaps in the circle were on its north-west and east-southeast sides, where the stones may have been removed for use as road metal. In 1950, it was noted that some of the stones had since been disrupted by military training during the Second World War. When the site was surveyed in 1989, thirteen stones remained in the circle, several of which were found to be in different locations from the 1920s. A 2009 survey by the Exmoor National Park Authority found only ten. A fuller archaeological investigation in 2013 revealed eleven upright stones and eight fallen. Gillings noted that as it exists in the twenty-first century, the circle is "clearly an amalgamation of prehistoric and wholly modern standing stones".

Directly adjacent to the north-east of the circle is a cairn that has been denuded, many of its stones being removed. There is a linear set of small stones 57 metres (187 feet) to the southeast of the circle's edge. First recorded in 1975, at the time the row contained eight stones, six of them upright, covering a length of 12 metres (39 feet). The stones were mostly very small and barely visible in the turf and were spaced at around 0.88 metres (2.9 feet) intervals. In 2012, a burn of the heather revealed that there were five more stones on the southeastern end of the row, indicating a total distance of 35.23 metres (115.6 feet). The relationship between this stone row and the stone circle is unclear because road construction and quarrying have taken place in the area between the two. The trajectory of the stone row would pass through the cairn adjacent to the circle.

Gillings argued that the stone row and cairn were part of a wider monumental landscape incorporating Porlock Stone Circle. He suggested that the cairn was built in the Early Bronze Age, with additions of rough paving around its perimeter made in the Middle Bronze Age. He also put forward the possibility that the stone circle was built during the Middle Bronze Age as part of a wider "re-organisation of the landscape" around the cairn.

=== Romano-British use ===
During the 2013 excavation, a four-spoked lead wheel measuring 7 centimetres (2.8 inches) in diameter was found buried in the circle. Although it could not be unequivocally identified, it resembled Late Iron Age and early Roman votive items that are sometimes found in Britain and (more commonly) Gaul. If this identification is correct, it would suggest that Porlock Stone Circle was known about and visited during the Romano-British period.

=== Investigation ===
Subsequent to its discovery in 1928 the site has suffered sustained (and significant) alterations to its fabric... Unusually, these alterations have not only involved the toppling, movement and removal of standing stones, but their introduction and addition, particularly over the last 24 years. Irrespective of its stability prior to its discovery, Porlock Circle has since become a very dynamic monument.

— Mark Gillings, 2015

The circle was rediscovered in the early 20th century by E. T. MacDermot, a man who lived in the Lillycombe estate near Porlock. He knew of several stones on Porlock Common but only noticed the wider circle after the heather was burnt away. MacDermot was aware that the archaeologist Harold St George Gray had investigated Exmoor's Withypool Stone Circle in 1905, and informed him of the discovery. In September and October 1928, Gray surveyed the Porlock circle with the permission of the landowner. He also briefly excavated a small area in the centre of the circle, where a dozen slabs of stone were revealed but no charcoal.

In August 2009 a resistivity survey of the site was carried out by Gillings and fellow archaeologist Jeremy Taylor, both of the University of Leicester. They did so at the behest of the Exmoor National Park Authority, which commissioned the research as part of their Monument Management Scheme. This survey indicated that there had been sub-rectangular structures situated around the circle at some point in the past, although Gillings and Taylor acknowledged that excavation would be required to determine at what period these existed. Gillings oversaw this excavation in 2013. His team opened a trench measuring 6 by 4 metres (20 by 13 feet) around the circle's northern arc. No artefacts from the period of original construction were revealed, nor were any sealed, undisturbed deposits suitable for environmental sampling and dating. A second trench was opened to examine stones located to the east of the circle, which Gillings's team believed had been part of the stone row.

=== Heritage management ===
The site has been designated as a scheduled monument under the Ancient Monuments and Archaeological Areas Act 1979. Surveys have shown a marked deterioration in its condition – in 1950 Gray could identify 21 stones as part of the circle, but by 2009 the survey on behalf of Exmoor National Park Authority found only 10. Stones have also been added to the circle in recent years, and heritage managers face the question as to whether they should be removed or accepted as part of the circle's on-going biography.
