= Withypool Stone Circle =

Late neolithic stone circle in Somerset, England

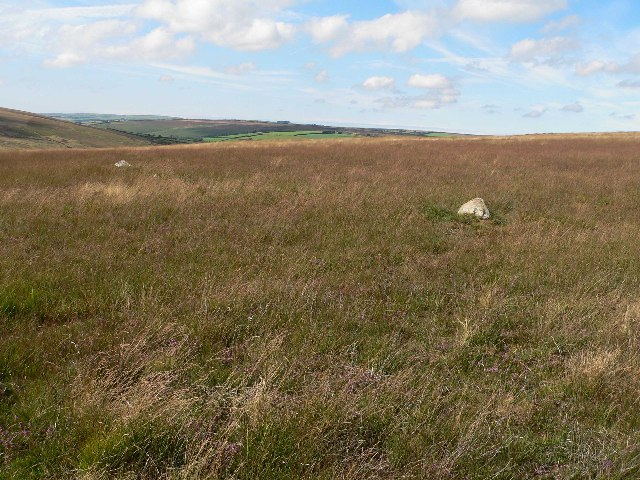
- The location of the circle in 2005; the stones are so small that discerning the site is difficult

- Location within Somerset
- 51.0963°N 3.6604°W
- Type: Stone circle
- Periods: Neolithic / Bronze Age
- Location: Withypool

Scheduled monument
- Official name: Stone circle on Withypool Hill 670m ESE of Portford Bridge
- Designated: 30 November 1925
- Reference no.: 1021261

Withypool Stone Circle, also known as Withypool Hill Stone Circle, is a stone circle located on the Exmoor moorland, near the village of Withypool in the southwestern English county of Somerset. The ring is part of a tradition of stone circle construction that spread throughout much of Britain, Ireland, and Brittany during the Late Neolithic and Early Bronze Age, over a period between 3300 and 900 BCE. The purpose of such monuments is unknown, although archaeologists speculate that the stones represented supernatural entities for the circle's builders.

Many monuments were built in Exmoor during the Bronze Age, but only two stone circles survive in this area: the other is Porlock Stone Circle. The Withypool ring is located on the south-western slope of Withypool Hill, on an area of heathland. It is about 36.4 metres (119 feet 5 inches) in diameter. Around thirty small gritstones remain, although there may originally have been around 100; there are conspicuous gaps on the northern and western sides of the monument. The site was rediscovered in 1898 and surveyed by the archaeologist Harold St George Gray in 1905.

== Location ==
Withypool Stone Circle is located on the south-western slope of Withypool Hill; some sources refer to it as Withypool Hill Stone Circle. The site is 381 metres (1,250 feet) above sea level. It is 670 metres (730 yards) east of Portford Bridge, and 4.4 kilometres (2.7 miles) south/south-west of Exford.

The site slopes down from east to west. The topsoil is peaty with heather. A range of different round barrows, a type of tumulus from the Bronze Age, are visible at different points in the surrounding landscape. There is a lone tumulus 262 metres (287 yards) to the north-east of the circle, on the summit of Withypool Hill, although this is so eroded that it can no longer be seen from Withypool Stone Circle itself. The three Brightworthy Barrows can be seen from the circle in a north-west direction. Other Bronze Age barrows visible from the circle are the Green Barrow, the Old Barrow, the Twitchen Barrows, the three Wam Barrows of Winsford Hill, and the barrow on top of Sherdon.

Also visible from the circle is a scatter of over thirty stones on the Westwater Allotment; these are up to 0.5 m (1.6 ft) long and in 1988 two were reported as being standing. Elsewhere on Withypool Common is a collection of six stones arranged in a rough circle, which may have represented another stone circle or perhaps the kerbstones from a since-destroyed round cairn.

== Context ==
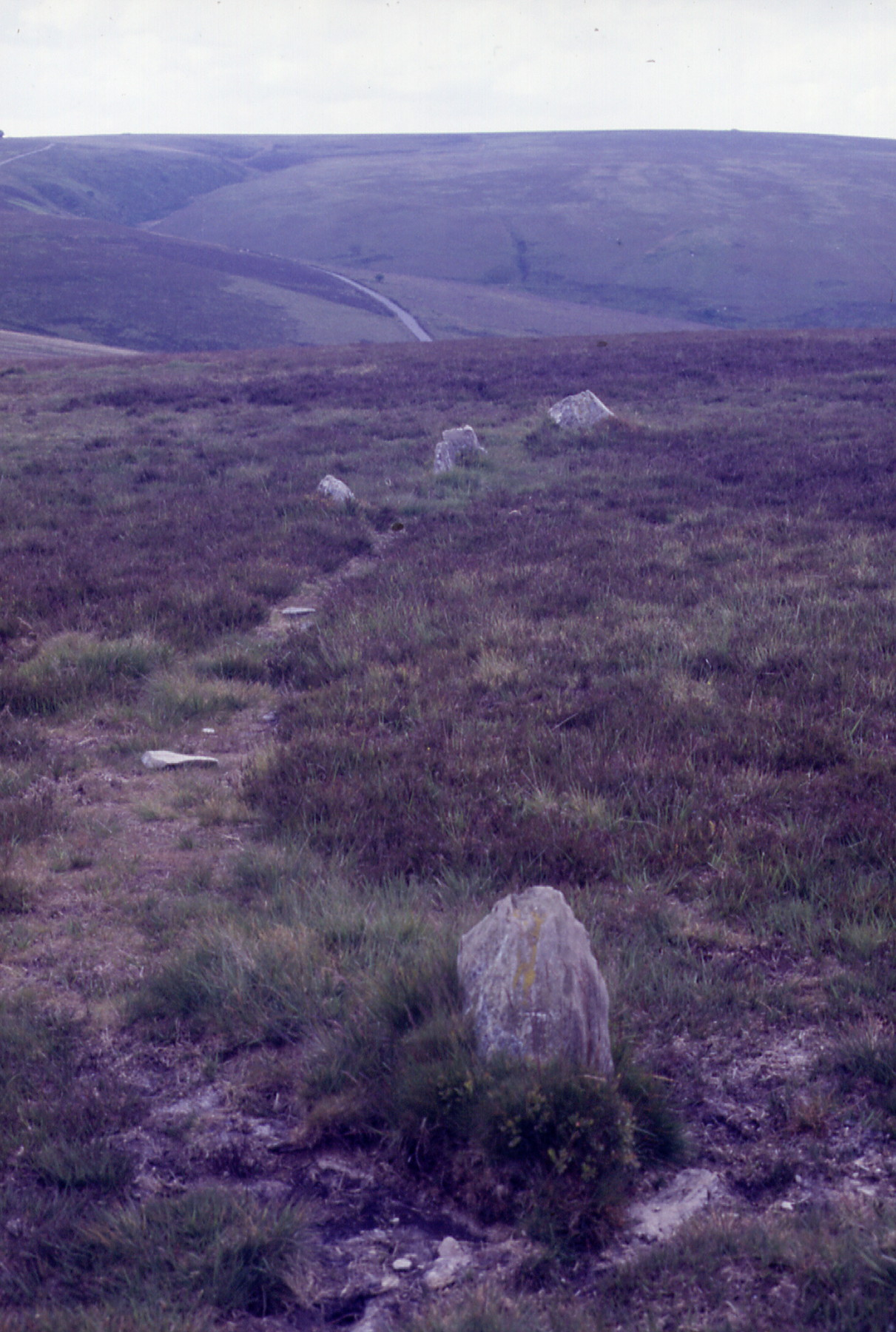
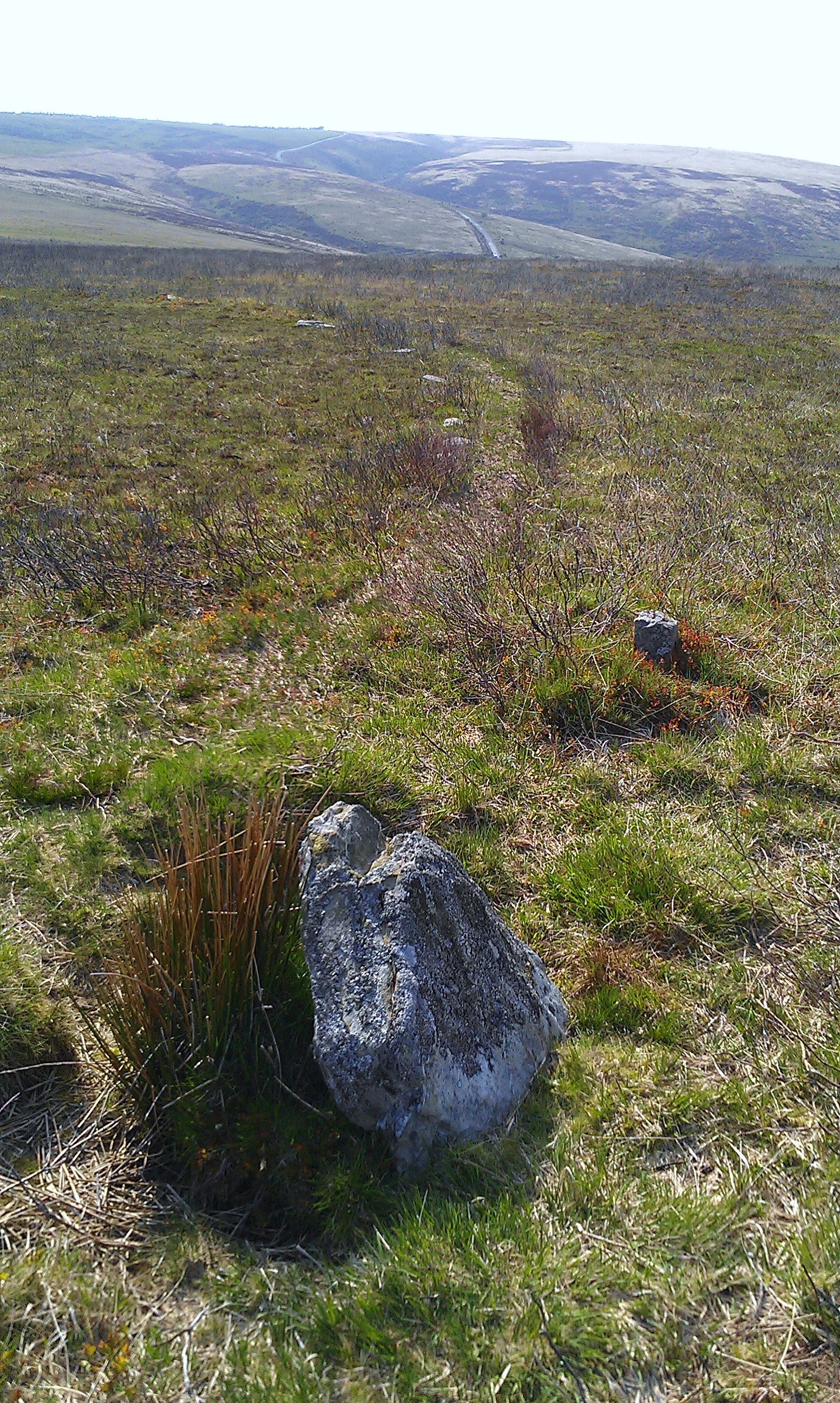
Stones present on the two ends of the circle

While the transition from the Early Neolithic to the Late Neolithic in the fourth and third millennia BCE saw much economic and technological continuity, there was a considerable change in the style of monuments erected, particularly in what is now southern and eastern England. By 3000 BCE, the long barrows, causewayed enclosures, and cursuses which had predominated in the Early Neolithic were no longer built, and had been replaced by circular monuments of various kinds. These include earthen henges, timber circles, and stone circles. Stone circles are found in most areas of Britain where stone is available, with the exception of the island's south-eastern corner. They are most densely concentrated in south-western Britain and on the north-eastern horn of Scotland, near Aberdeen. The tradition of their construction may have lasted for 2,400 years, from 3300 to 900 BCE, with the major phase of building taking place between 3000 and 1,300 BCE.

These stone circles typically show very little evidence of human visitation during the period immediately following their creation. This suggests that they were not sites used for rituals that left archaeologically visible evidence, but may have been deliberately left as "silent and empty monuments". The archaeologist Mike Parker Pearson suggests that in Neolithic Britain, stone was associated with the dead, and wood with the living. Other archaeologists have suggested that the stones might not represent ancestors, but rather other supernatural entities, such as deities.

=== Stone circles in Exmoor ===
There are only two known prehistoric stone circles on Exmoor: Withypool and Porlock Stone Circle. The archaeologist Leslie Grinsell suggested that the circular stone monument on Almsworthy Common was "probably" the remains of a stone circle, although more recent assessments regard it one of the stone settings, a different form of monument which is more common across Exmoor.

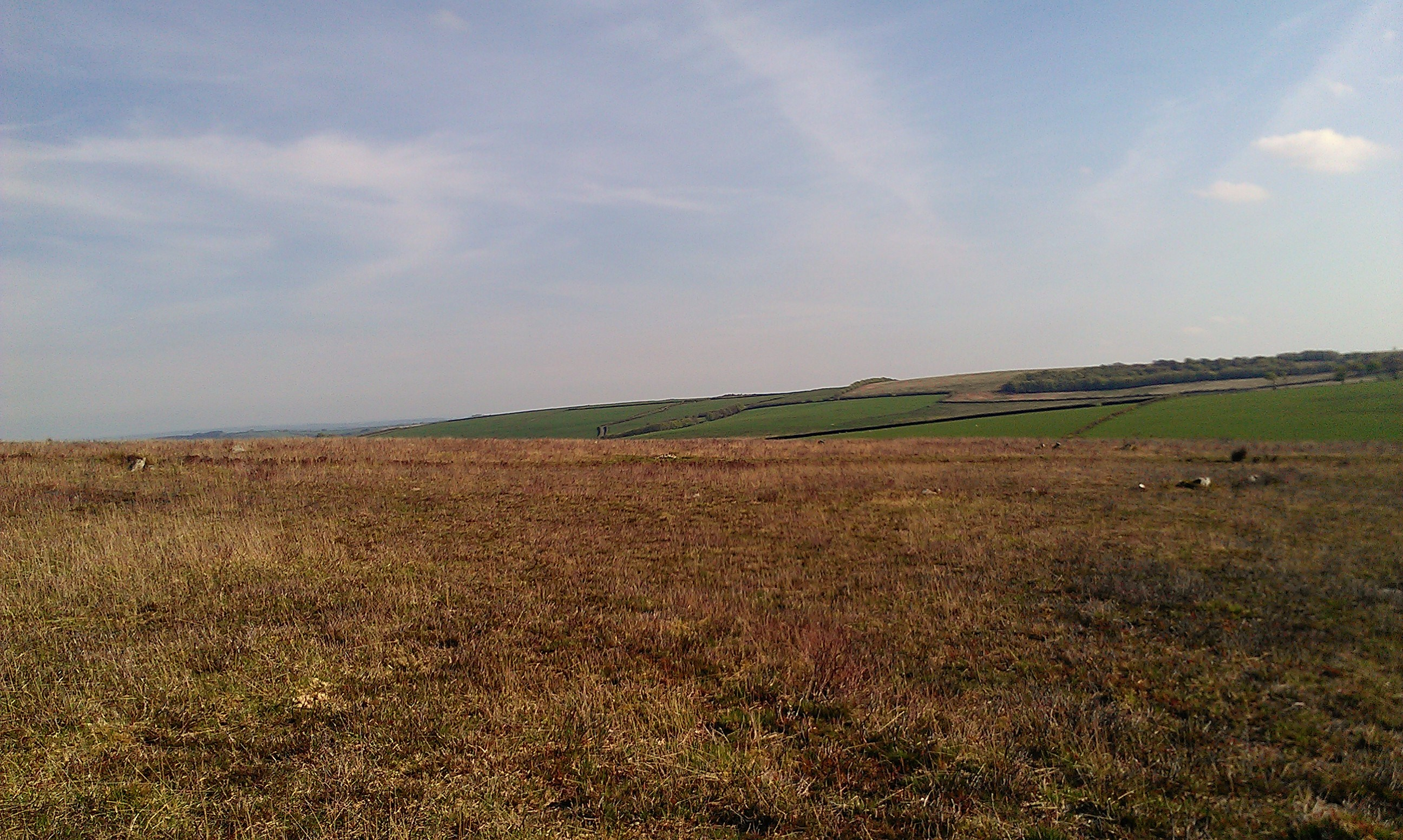
Withypool Stone Circle in its landscape context, 2014

Archaeologists have dated these circles to the Late Neolithic or Early Bronze Age, and have noted that they are comparable to the stone circles found further south, on Dartmoor. In contrast to the two known Exmoor circles, over seventy such monuments have been identified on Dartmoor. This may be because Exmoor, unlike Dartmoor, has no natural granite. Instead it has Devonian slates and Hangman Grits, both of which easily break up into small slabs, resulting in a general shortage of big stones on Exmoor.

This scarcity of large stones may explain why Neolithic and Bronze Age communities used small stones, termed miniliths, in the two Exmoor circles and in other monuments within the region. There are nevertheless other constructions in the area, such as the clapper bridge at Tarr Steps and the three-metre Long Stone at Challacombe, which do use locally sourced large megaliths. This suggests that larger stones would have been available had the sites' builders desired, and that the use of miniliths was therefore deliberate.

Exmoor also has a henge, near Parracombe, although it has been damaged by ploughing. Alongside this, the moor bears a profusion of other Bronze Age monuments, including between 300 and 400 round barrows, standing stones, linear stone rows, and stone settings. The creation of these different monument types might also explain why so few stone circles were apparently created here. Most of the surviving prehistoric stone monuments on Exmoor are located on those areas of moorland outside the limits of medieval and post-medieval agriculture. For this reason it is likely that the surviving sites are not a reliable indicator of the original extent of these sites.

== Description ==
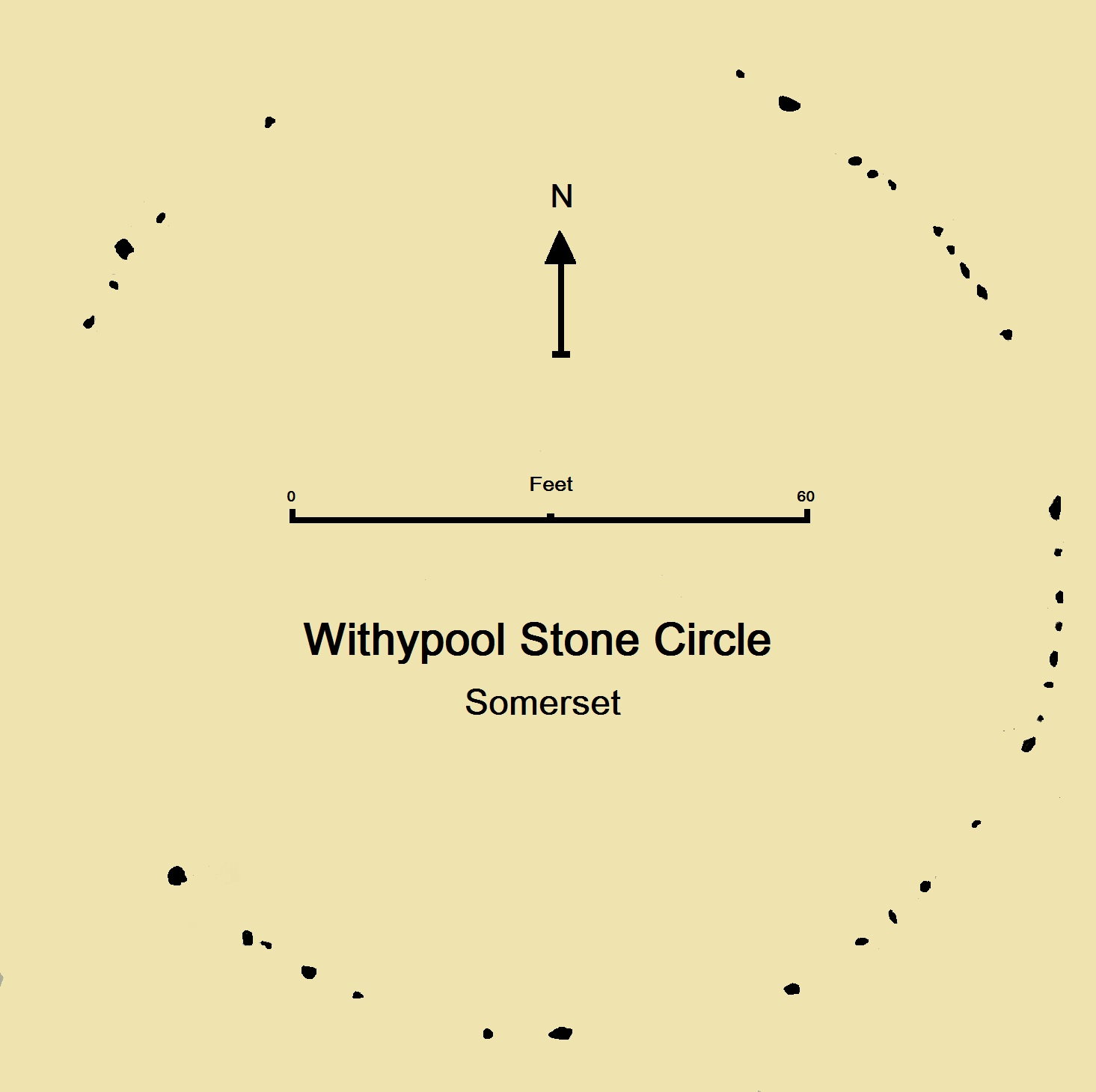
Plan of the site as it existed in 1905

The stone circle measures 36.4 metres (119 feet 5 inches) in diameter. In 1905, there were 37 stones remaining in the circle. At the time there were conspicuous gaps on the northern and western sides of the ring; the stones perhaps in these areas may have been removed for use as road metal. There are ground depressions where some of these stones have been removed. In 1915 it was reported that one had been removed but that three additional stones had been found in the circle. By 1988, Martin J. F. Fowler reported that there were only 29 stones in the circle. Conversely, the following year the archaeologist Aubrey Burl reported 30 stones, of which three had fallen and 27 remained standing. Originally it may have included around 100 stones, spaced about one metre (3 feet 3 inches) apart.

The stones themselves are small: on average they measure 10 cm (3.9 in) in height, 30 cm (one foot) in width, and 10 cm (3.9 in) in depth. The largest protrudes about 0.5 metres (1 foot 8 inches) from the ground. Most are incomplete, and likely have been broken since the original erection of the circle. It is not known if all the stones in the circle come from the same natural rock, but a sample from one stone was examined and found to be a hard, pale grey gritstone, likely taken from the nearby Pickwell Down grits. There are conspicuous quartz veins in many of the circle's stones.

=== Investigation ===
The site was accidentally rediscovered in 1898 when Archibald Hamilton was riding across Withypool Heath. His horse stumbled on one of the stones, and on further investigation he located other stones within the bracken. After the bracken on the heath was burned by farmers, Hamilton returned to pay closer attention to the circle. He contacted Colonel Bramble, the Vice President of the Somerset Archaeological and Natural History Society, who put him in touch with the archaeologist Harold St George Gray. Gray accompanied Hamilton on a visit to the site in August 1905, when he made a complete survey of the ring.

Gray published his findings in a 1906 volume of the Proceedings of the Somerset Archaeological and Natural History Society, in which he drew comparisons between the site and two Cornish stone circles that he had recently surveyed, Fernacre and Stannon Stone Circle. He suggested that the circle had been the site of cremations, the cremated human remains then being buried within the nearby tumuli. In August 1915, Gray returned to the site. He noted that the circle was in largely the same condition as before, but that the ling and whortleberry bushes around the site were more stunted than they had previously been. Between 1982 and 1985, Fowler visited Withypool Stone Circle alongside other prehistoric stone monuments in Exmoor for a catalogue published in a 1988 edition of the Proceedings.

The site has been designatedas a scheduled monument since 1925, and is thus accorded legal protection under the Ancient Monuments and Archaeological Areas Act 1979.
