= Geology of Exmoor National Park =

The geology of Exmoor National Park in south-west England contributes significantly to the character of Exmoor, a landscape which was designated as a national park in 1954. The bedrock of the area consists almost wholly of a suite of sedimentary rocks deposited during the Devonian, a period named for the English county of Devon in which the western half of the park sits. The eastern part lies within Somerset and it is within this part of the park that limited outcrops of Triassic and Jurassic age rocks are to be found.

== Devonian ==
Each of the individual sandstones and mudstones of Devonian age within the park are ascribed to the Exmoor Group.

=== Lynton Formation ===
The oldest strata (of Emsian to Eifelian age) are the slates and finely laminated sandstones of the Lynton Formation (traditionally known as the Lynton Slates or Lynton Beds) which are exposed along the coast in the Lynmouth area between Woody Bay and Countisbury Hill. They also extend west in the lowermost part of the cliffs as far as Ramsey Beach, near Heddon's Mouth. The Valley of Rocks is an abandoned valley carved into this formation west of Lynmouth.

=== Hangman Sandstone Formation ===
The Lynton Formation sandstones are overlain by those of the Hangman Sandstone Formation (traditionally the Hangman Grits) of Eifelian to Givetian age and which may be up to 2500m thick. This unit also includes some shales, mudstones, siltstones and conglomerates. These rocks are exposed along the entire coast east from Hangman Point to Woody Bay and again from Countisbury Hill to Porlock Weir. They also form the cliffed coast of North Hill, west of Minehead. The highest point on Exmoor, Dunkery Beacon, is formed from the Hangman Sandstone whilst Dunster Castle is built upon a spur of the same rock. In March 2024 scientists reported the discovery of a fossilised forest of calamophyton trees at a coastal site near Minehead, its age being four million years greater than a fossil forest in New York State which had previously held the record as the world's oldest.

=== Ilfracombe Slates Formation ===
Next comes the Ilfracombe Slates Formation (earlier known as the Ilfracombe Beds) which is a succession of sandstones, slates and a fossiliferous limestone of Givetian to Frasnian age. The formation is subdivided into several ‘members’ of which the lowest (oldest) is the Wild Pear Slates (named for its occurrence at Wild Pear Beach), overlain by the Lester Slates and Sandstone (named for Lester Point and Cliff where it is exposed), then the Combe Martin Slates and finally the Kentisbury Slates which is the uppermost i.e. youngest part of the formation. The latter two are not exposed on the Exmoor coast but are to found within the park, in a strip of country east from Kentisbury.

=== Morte Slates Formation ===
The Ilfracombe Slates are overlain in turn by the Morte Slates Formation of Frasnian to Famennian age. Extending east from Challacombe, the slates provide much of the high ground south of the B3358 road through Simonsbath and Exford including Setta Barrow and form the Brendon Hills before extending to the easternmost extremity of the park at Elworthy.

=== Pickwell Down Sandstones, Upcott Slates and Baggy Sandstones formations ===
Sandstones and shales characterise the next unit which is the Pickwell Down Sandstones Formation (earlier known as the Pickwell Down Beds) which is of Famennian age. The Upcott Slates Formation, also of Famennian age, follows. The youngest Devonian rocks within the national park are sandstones, mudstones and siltstones of the overlying Baggy Sandstone Formation (earlier the Baggy and Marwood Beds), a small part of which is to be found within the park boundary just east of Brayford.

== Permo-Trias ==
Unconformably overlying the Hangman Sandstone in the Porlock Basin is the Luccombe Breccia Formation, a presumed Permian age deposit consisting of calcareous breccia, sandstone and conglomerate which may be up to 650m thick.

A further presumed unconformity separates the breccia from the mudstones of the overlying Mercia Mudstone Group which underlie the larger part of the low ground between Exmoor and North Hill. At the top of the group is a 25m thickness of mudstones with gypsum referred to as the Blue Anchor Formation. Above this are around 12m thickness of mudstones and limestone assigned to the Penarth Group.

== Lias ==
A small outlier of largely Jurassic age Lias strata lies at the northern margin of the Porlock Basin up against the southwesterly down-throwing fault which marks the northeastern edge of this half-graben. Perhaps as much as a 100m thickness of the Blue Lias overlies the Penarth Group. The lowermost part of the Lias may be latest Triassic in age. In character it is grey mudstones and shales with thin limestones.

== Structure ==
West of Porlock, the fold axis of the Lynton Anticline traces a curve beneath Culbone Hill, causing the Hangman Sandstones to dip moderately steeply to the north along the coastal strip. A series of broadly east–west oriented folds affect the Hangman Sandstones at North Hill and south of Minehead.

The Lynmouth-East Lyn Fault is a reverse or thrust fault dipping south at about 45 degrees which brings Lynton Slates over the Hangman Sandstones.

== Quaternary ==
Exmoor was to the south of the ice-sheet during the last glacial period though it has been postulated that a small glacier may have occupied the anomalously deep feature on the north side of Winsford Hill known as the Punchbowl. During the earlier Anglian glaciation, the British ice-sheet extended as far south as the present day north coast of Somerset and Devon. Exmoor would have been subject to intense periglacial processes at this time and during other glacial periods.

Tidal flat deposits occupy the low ground at Porlock, landward of which are river terraces and the modern day alluvial deposits associated with the Horner Water and its tributaries. Deposits of fragmentary rock material, the result of weathering and downslope movement of the underlying bedrock are known as ‘head’ and are widely recorded within the valleys of the national park. A number of areas of peat are recorded on the upland surface of Exmoor. Small areas of talus (or scree) are found either side of Heddon Mouth. A variety of marine deposits are to be found along the shoreline including sand and cobbles whilst storm beach deposits are to be seen at Lynmouth.

== Mining ==
Iron ore was formerly mined in the Brendon Hills where mineral-bearing lodes provided lens-shaped bodies of ore. The highest production levels were achieved in 1877 when almost 50,000 tons were mined. Operations reduced thereafter and all work had ceased in 1910. Copper was mined near North Molton where it was found in association with lead, zinc, antimony and manganese ores. These and some gold were emplaced by fluids associated with the emplacement of the Cornubian batholith of which the Dartmoor granite is the largest exposed part.

Silver and lead were worked at Combe Martin during the thirteenth century and again during the Elizabethan era.
