= Exmoor Group =

Geological formation in England

- Stratigraphic range: Emsian (Devonian) to Tournaisian (Carboniferous)
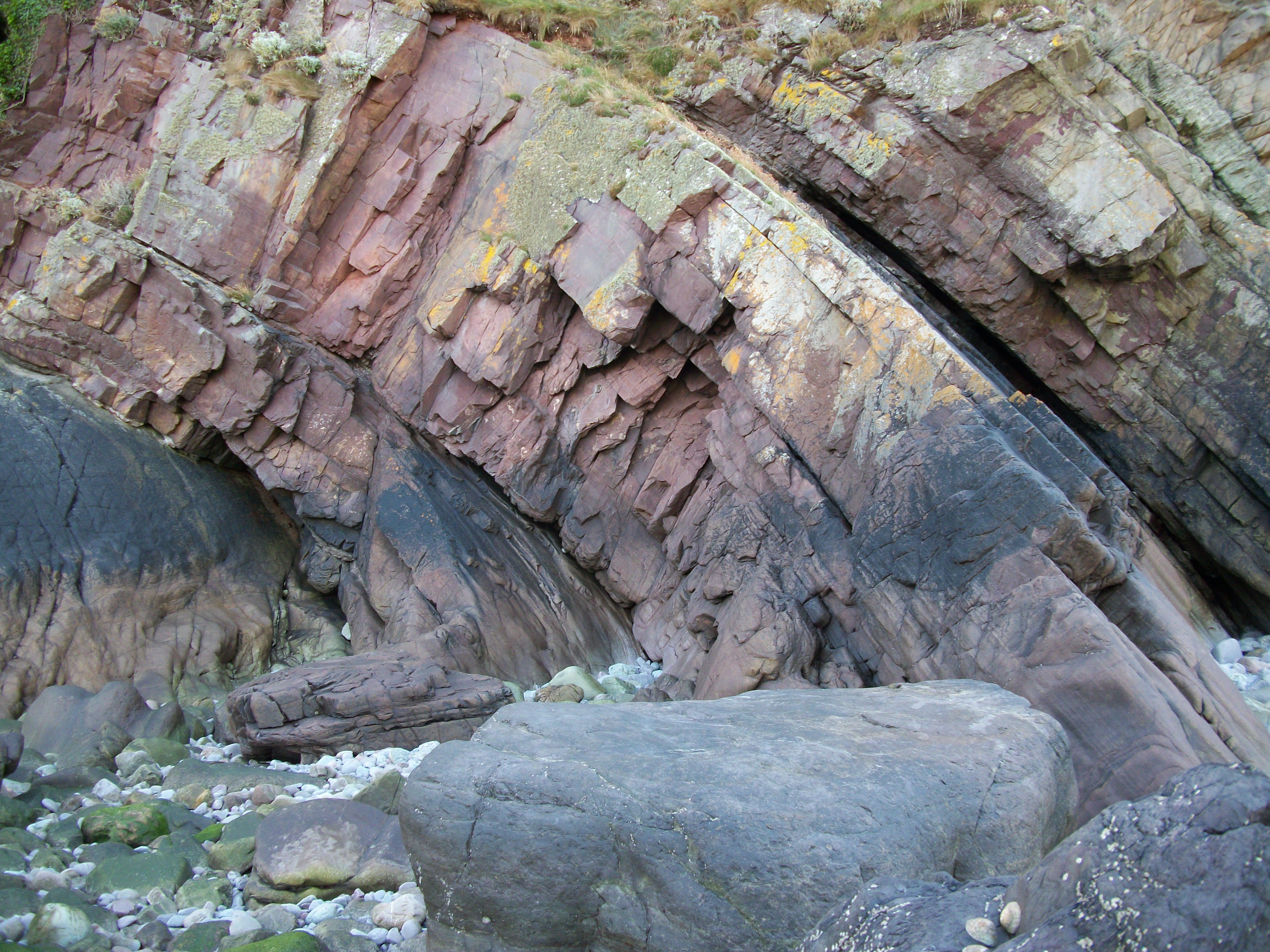
- Hangman Sandstone Formation at Glenthorne Beach, 6 km W of Porlock Weir
- Type: Group
- Sub-units: Lynton Formation, Hangman Sandstone Formation, Ilfracombe Slates (Formation), Morte Slates (Formation), Pickwell Down Sandstones (Formation), Upcott Slates (Formation), Baggy Sandstone Formation, Pilton Mudstone Formation
- Underlies: Doddiscombe Formation of Teign Valley Group
- Thickness: about 7000 m

Lithology
- Primary: mudstones,
- Other: siltstones, sandstones, limestones, conglomerates

Location
- Region: England
- Country: United Kingdom
- Extent: north Devon to west Somerset

Type section
- Named for: Exmoor

The Exmoor Group is a late Devonian to early Carboniferous lithostratigraphic group (a sequence of rock strata) in southwest England whose outcrop extends from Croyde in north Devon east across Exmoor to Minehead in west Somerset. The group comprises the following formations (in stratigraphic order, i.e., the oldest at the base and the youngest at the top):

- Pilton Mudstone Formation (Pilton Beds, Pilton Shales)
- Baggy Sandstones Formation (Baggy Beds, Marwood Beds)
- Upcott Slates Formation
- Pickwell Down Sandstones Formation
- Morte Slates Formation
- Ilfracombe Slates Formation
- Hangman Sandstone Formation (Hangman Grits)
- Lynton Formation (Lynton Beds, Lynton Slates)

Each of these divisions has been given different names by different authors in the past including those shown in brackets above. Some that had been classed as 'formations' (or even in one case as a 'group') are now 'members'.

== Lynton Formation ==
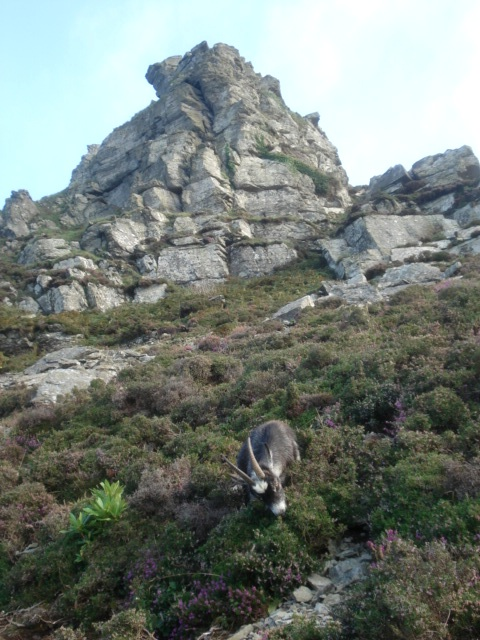
Eros rock in the Valley of the Rocks

Extending east from Woody Bay, the Lynton Formation underlies the village from which the sequence is named and continues in a thin strip of country as far east as the hamlet of Oare. There is a small inlier of the Lynton Slates at the foot of the Quantock scarp at Triscombe. The formation is composed of slates and siltstones together with some sandstone. Though its base is not seen, it is believed to be between 3–400 m thick. There are fossils of brachiopods, bivalves and bryozoans present, consistent with a shallow marine depositional environment. One of Devon and Exmoor's better known natural tourist attractions is Valley of the Rocks, a dry valley developed in this formation just to the west of Lynton.

== Hangman Sandstone Formation ==
The Hangman Sandstone forms the coastal outcrop east from Hangman Point as far as Heddon's Mouth and indeed the larger part of the cliffs eastwards again to Woody Bay. It again forms the coastal cliffs from Lynmouth Bay east to Porlock Weir, including Foreland Point and Culbone Hill and also from Hurlstone Point to Minehead. The Porlock Ridge and Saltmarsh Site of Special Scientific Interest has a shingle ridge deposited during the Holocene epoch. Inland it forms the high ground east to Dunkery Beacon and much of Croydon Hill. The larger part of the Quantock Hills are formed from the same strata. The Hangman Sandstone consist of several members which once enjoyed the status of 'formations'. These are (oldest base, youngest at top):

- Little Hangman Member (Little Hangman Sandstones, Stringocephalus Beds, Little Hangman Formation)
- Sherrycombe Member (Sherrycombe Beds, Sherrycombe Formation)
- Rawns Member (Rawns Shales and Sandstone, Rawns Formation)
- Trentishoe Member (Trentishoe Grits, Trentishoe Formation)
- Hollowbrook Member (Hollowbrook Formation)

Names in brackets indicate earlier names for the current members. The 'Stringocephalus Beds' and 'Sherrycombe Beds' were formerly grouped as the 'Upper Hangman Grits'.

The thickness of the strata is estimated at between 1660 m and 2500 m; intense faulting and folding precludes an exact measurement being made. Consisting largely of sandstones but with some alternating shales and slates and some conglomerates, most of the formation is non-marine in origin. Plant and shell remains have been found though fossils are generally scarce within the formation. The sequence east of Lynmouth used to be referred to as the "Foreland Grits", and was thought to be somewhat older, and hence lower in the sequence, than the Hangman Grits

In March 2024 scientists reported the discovery of a fossilised forest of Calamophyton trees at a site near Minehead, its age being four million years greater than a fossil forest in New York State which had previously held the record as the world's oldest.

The Trentishoe Member exhibits unusual deposition at the Glenthorne Site of Special Scientific Interest.

== Ilfracombe Slates Formation ==
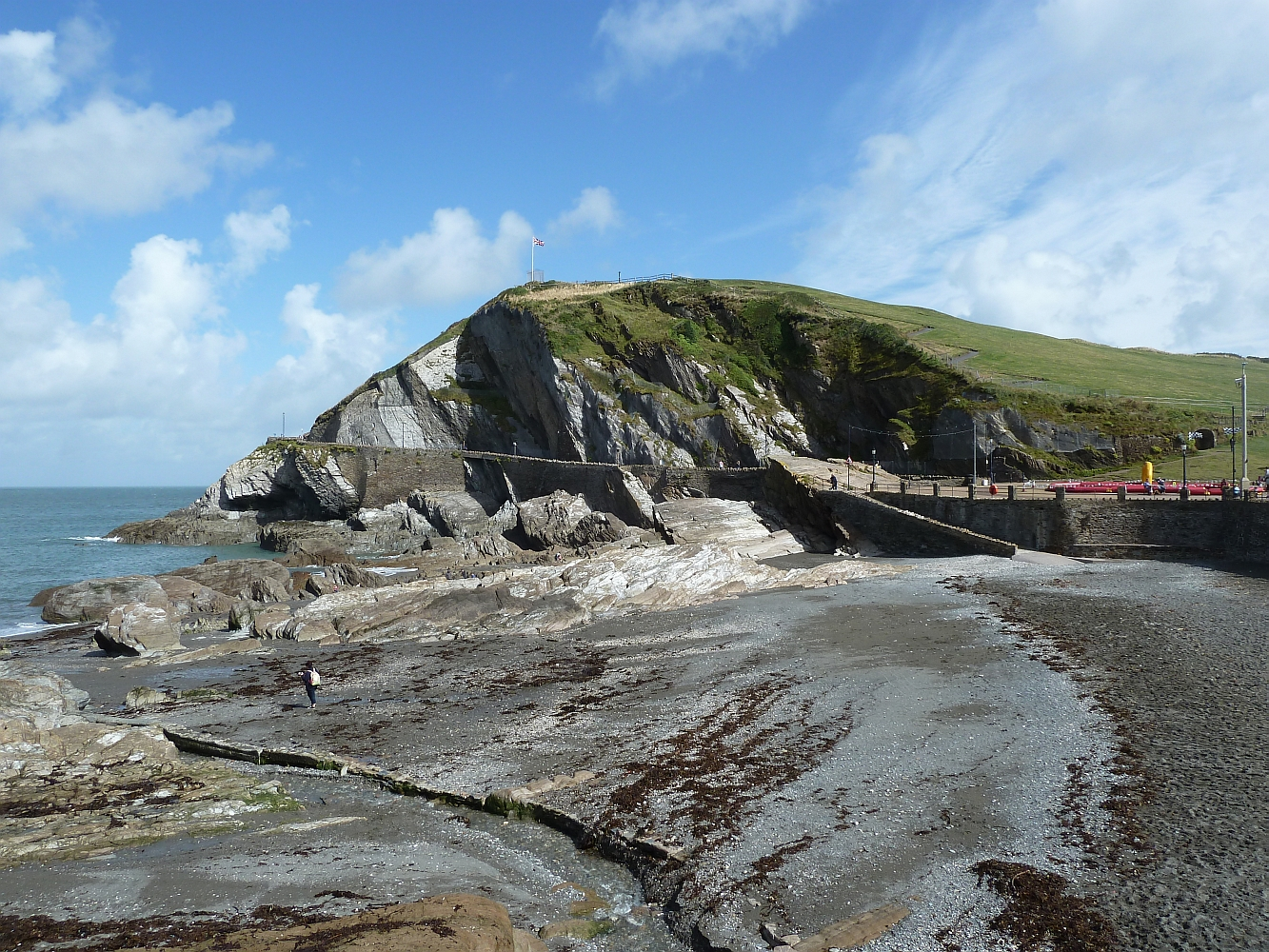
Capstone Hill at Ilfracombe

The formation comprises slates and limestones of marine origin and sandstones and slates with a shallow marine or deltaic origin. In the west, the Ilfracombe Slates are subdivided into (oldest at base, youngest at top):

- Kentisbury Slates Member
- Combe Martin Slates Member
- Lester Slates-and-Sandstones Member
- Wild Pear Slates Member

The Wild Pear Slates are named from Wild Pear Beach at Combe Martin Bay where this sequence outcrops on the coast. The lower boundary of this sequence is a thrust fault which carries the slates up over the Hangman Grits. The overlying Lester Slates-and-Sandstones run from Widmouth Head, beneath the village of Combe Martin and on in a SSE direction to near Parracombe. The Combe Martin Slates in turn extend from Beacon Point at Hele in a narrowing outcrop to Pinkworthy Pond and beyond. The Kentisbury Slates form the coastal outcrop at Ilfracombe itself and extend inland via Kentisbury, Challacombe and Simonsbath towards Exford.

In the east, the following subdivisions are identified. Some earlier (now formally obsolete) names are given in brackets afterwards:

- Leighland Slates Member (Leighland Beds)
- Cutcombe Slates Member
- Avill Slates and Sandstones Member (Avill Group)

In the Quantock Hills, the Avill Slates form the high ground of Lydeard Hill above West Bagborough, together with the lower northeastern slopes of the range between Aisholt and Holford. A tuff occurs within the Avill member on these eastern slopes at Keeper's Combe. The Cutcombe Slates form the ground immediately east of the Avill outcrop in this area whilst the Leighland Slates make up a band of higher ground between Cothelstone and Enmore with scattered outcrops extending north to Nether Stowey. Several limestone beds are named within the two upper members; oldest/lowermost first - the Rodhuish, Roadwater, Aisholt, Holwell and Leigh Barton limestones.

== Morte Slates Formation ==
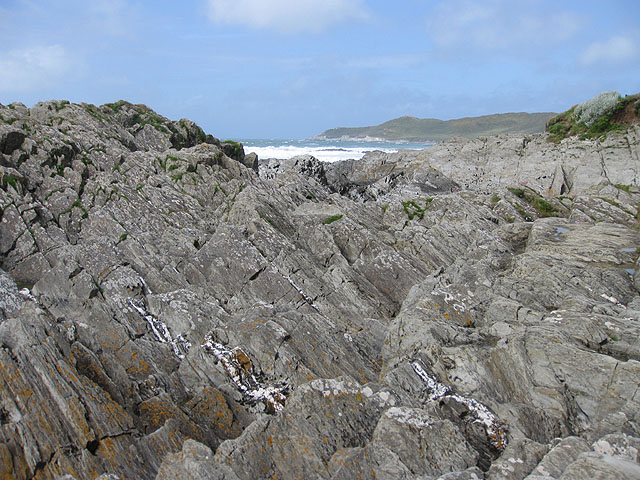
Morte Slates at Woolacombe

The Morte Slates are a series of silvery-grey to green coloured slates with some subordinate sandstone and siltstone. A well-developed cleavage has removed what fossils may have earlier been present in these one-time submarine muds. These rocks extend from Morte Point, where they form the coast between Woolacombe and Flat Point, south-southeastwards through West Down and Arlington then east to Withypool. Further east the outcrop broadens to form the Brendon Hills and the rolling country around Clatworthy Reservoir. The eastern extent of the main outcrop reaches the villages of Stogumber and Tolland. An outlier forms the southeastern part of the Quantock Hills between Goathurst and West Monkton.

Over the centuries the Brendon Hills have been mined for minerals, notably ironstone from which iron is extracted for making steel. During the 19th century this activity reached a peak with the West Somerset Mineral Railway, including an 800 feet (244 m) incline, being built to take the ore to Watchet from where it was sent to Ebbw Vale for smelting. The main mining operations ended when the mines were worked out towards the end of the 19th century.

== Pickwell Down Sandstones Formation ==
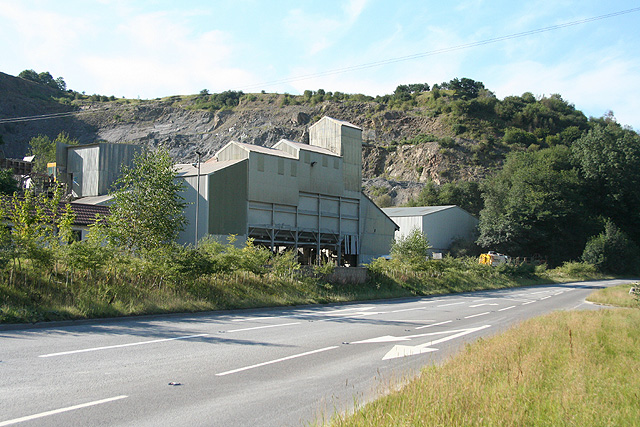
Brayford Quarry

The Pickwell Down Sandstones are red and brown sandstones with shales which extend from the hills of Pickwell Down and Woolacombe Down overlooking Morte Bay east-southeastwards to Muddiford and Bratton Fleming. The outcrop pattern is shaped by a major east–west aligned syncline/anticline pair between Brayford, where there is a stone quarry, and Dulverton. East of Dulverton the formation forms the prominent Haddon Hill and extends via Heydon Hill as far east as the village of Wiveliscombe. There are a number of former workings for iron, copper and manganese across the western part of its outcrop. A geomorphological survey at Anstey's Coombe showed that mining had taken place at the site during both the Romano-British period and the 16th to 17th century.

== Upcott Slates Formation ==
The Upcott Slates provide the coastal cliffs on the south side of Morte Bay and their narrow faulted outcrop continues east-southeastwards beneath Georgeham and to Winsham and Marwood. The outcrop continues east via Shirwell to Little Bray, north of Brayford. Slightly offset by faulting to the south, it continues east to North Radworthy. A major east–west syncline in this area gives rise to an outcrop stretching southwest to East Buckland and then by virtue of a parallel anticline, stretching southeast then east to North Molton. Subject to numerous northwest–southeast aligned faults, the outcrop can be followed via Molland to east of Dulverton. The formation consists of slates varying in colour from buff through grey and green to purple. These rocks originated as muds laid down in swamps and freshwater lakes.

== Baggy Sandstones Formation ==
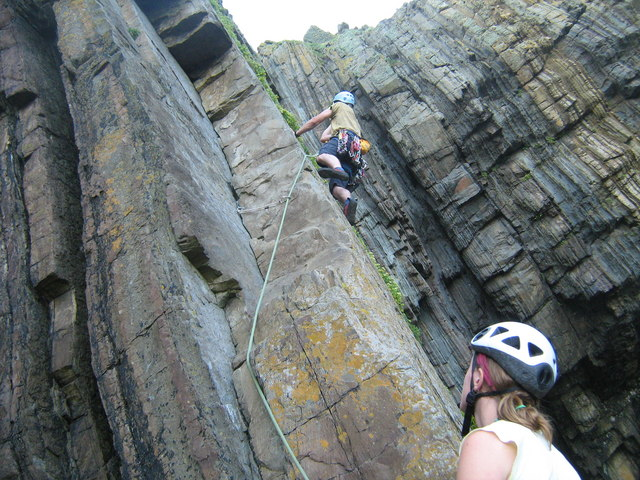
Climbers on the Baggy Sandstone at Baggy Point

The Baggy Sandstones form the headland of Baggy Point and the faulted outcrop stretches away to the east north of Croyde, through Knowle to Stoke Rivers and Brayford. Its outcrop wraps around a syncline/anticline fold pair in a reverse-S shape via East Buckland and parallels the outcrop of the Upcott Slates east to Dulverton. It is mapped as a distinguishable unit of the Exmoor Group as far as the Batherm valley, east of Skilgate. The formation consists of sandstones, siltstones and shales including some feldspar and mica rich units, variously of marine through brackish to freshwater origin. The outcrop forms a small yet prominent ridge along its outcrop.

== Pilton Mudstone Formation ==
The Pilton Mudstones form the coast at Croyde Bay and form the headland at Saunton Down. The formation extends eastwards through Barnstaple to the Buckland area where due to a syncline/anticline pair, the surface outcrop divides. A thinner band of these strata continues east coincident with the valley of the River Yeo and the former railway to Brushford. The outcrop broadens once again forming the country around Clayhanger and Waterrow before reaching its furthest east at Kittisford and at Nunnington Park, south of Wiveliscombe. The formation consists of shales and siltstones along with bands of calcareous sandstone. Fossils include brachiopods and bivalves in the lower part of the formation, suggestive of a shallow marine depositional environment and, in its upper part, trilobites and goniatites indicating deeper water conditions. The sandstones thicken to the east and have been worked in quarries between Charles and Brayford. Limestones occurring towards the top of the formation have also been worked in places. Whilst most of it is Devonian, the uppermost part of the formation is Carboniferous in age though the precise location of the boundary is difficult to determine.
