= High Bray =

Village in Devon, England

Coordinates: 51.092901°N 3.8706081°W

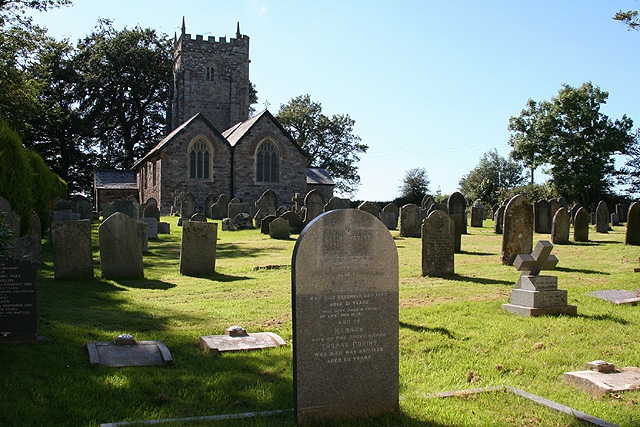
- All Saints' Church

- Location within Devon
- Civil parish: Brayford
- District: North Devon
- Shire county: Devon
- Region: South West
- Country: England
- Sovereign state: United Kingdom

High Bray is a village, church of England parish and former civil parish, now in the parish of Brayford, in the North Devon district, in the county of Devon, England. In 1961 the civil parish had a population of 150. On 1 April 1986 the parish was abolished and merged with Charles to form Brayford.

Wildlife filmmaker Johnny Kingdom was born and grew up in the village.
