= Knowle Hill Castle =

Iron Age fort in Devon, England

Coordinates: 51.1234°N 4.1680°W

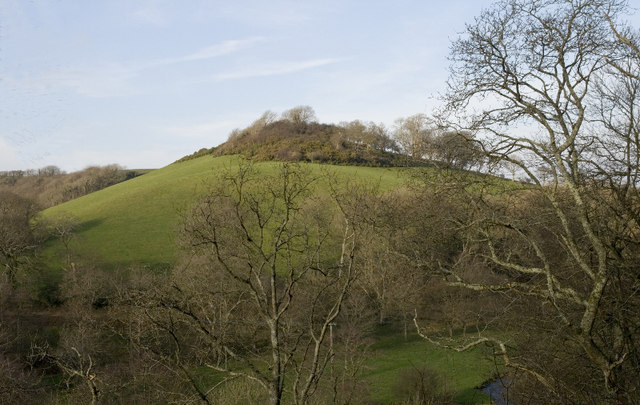
Knowle Hill Castle

Knowle Hill Castle is an Iron Age hill fort in Devon, England. The fort is situated approximately 90 metres (300 ft) above sea level on a promontory above the River Caen, north of Braunton and close to the village of Knowle.
