= Church of St John, Skilgate =

Church in Somerset, England

Church of St John
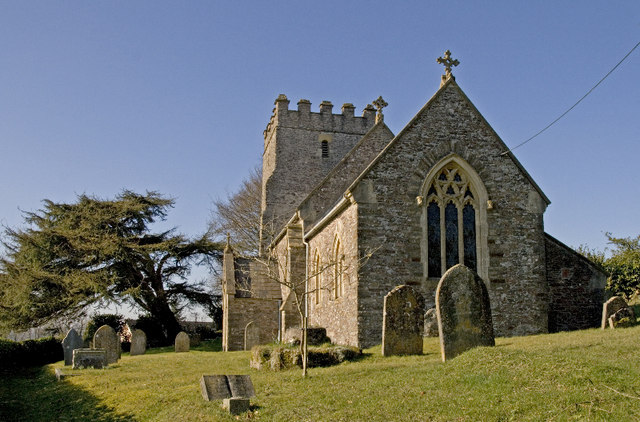

- Location within Somerset
- 51.0355°N 3.4463°W
- Location: Skilgate, Somerset, England

History
- Built: 14th century

Listed Building – Grade II*
- Official name: Church of St John
- Designated: 6 April 1959
- Reference no.: 1248077

The Anglican Church of St John in Skilgate, Somerset, England was built in the 14th century. It is a Grade II* listed building.

== History ==
The church was built in the 14th century and the tower remains, however the rest of the structure was rebuilt as a Victorian restoration in 1872. Further restorations were undertaken in 1933 and 1972.

The parish is part of the Dulverton with Brushford, Brompton Regis, Upton, Withiel Florey and Skilgate benefice within the Diocese of Bath and Wells.

== Architecture ==
The stone building has Hamstone dressings and a slate roof. It consists of a two-bay nave with a north aisle, chancel, vestry and south porch. The two-stage tower has stepped buttresses.

Within the church is a plaque commemorating those who died in World War I. A new organ was installed in the 21st century.

In the churchyard is the remains of a cross.

== See also ==
- List of ecclesiastical parishes in the Diocese of Bath and Wells
