= Combe Martin Slates =

Geologic formation in England

- Stratigraphic range: Devonian
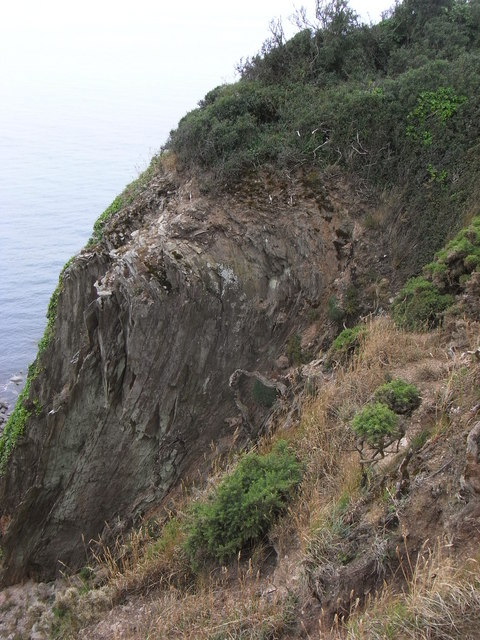
- Combe Martin Slate Member at Beacon Point
- Type: Formation
- Unit of: Ilfracombe Slates Formation

Lithology
- Primary: Slate

Location
- Region: England
- Country: United Kingdom

The Combe Martin Slates is a geologic formation in England. It preserves fossils dating back to the Devonian period.

== See also ==
- List of fossiliferous stratigraphic units in England
