= Shoulsbury castle =

Iron Age hill fort in Devon, England

Coordinates: 51.1364°N 3.8517°W

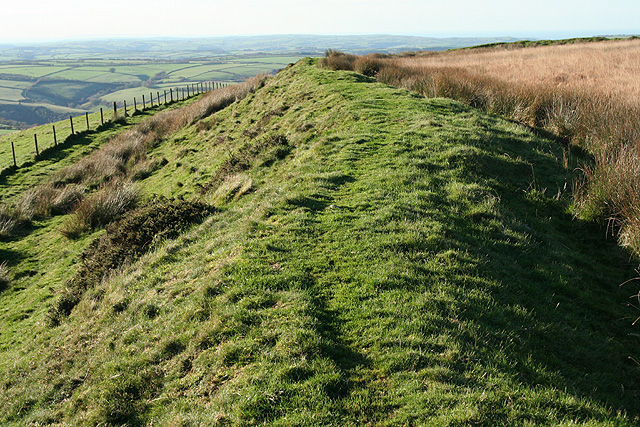
One of the ramparts

Shoulsbury Castle is an Iron Age hill fort close to Challacombe in Devon, England. It takes the form of a multi-ditch and rampart enclosure close to the top of a hill on the shoulder of Shoulsbarrow Common at an elevation of 472 metres (1,549 ft) above sea level.

Shoulsbury Castle is unusually rectangular and on a western hill spur suggesting that it is either Roman or Iron Age. It is the largest and best known hillfort on Exmoor that over the years has been referred to as Solsbury, Shorsbery, Salusbury, Shoulsbury, Showlsborough, Shoulsbarrow in various texts over the centuries. The area was occupied from the Iron Age into the early Saxon period by the Dumnonii people. In the 18th century it was suggested it was the work of the druids for the celebration of religious rites or "feats of activity or athletick exhibitions".

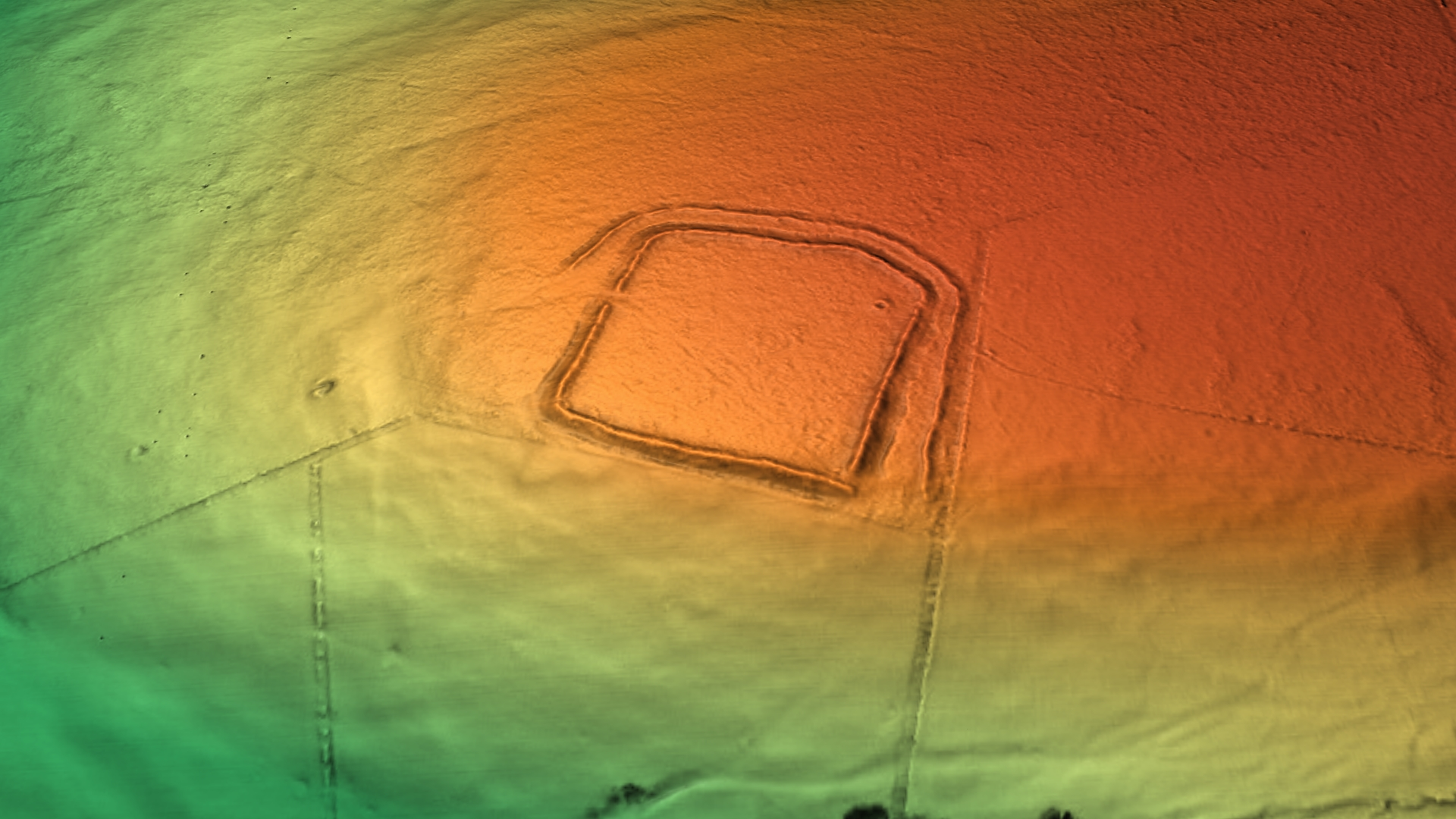
3D view of the digital terrain model

The fort is mainly double rampart but to the south natural topography allows only one. The unusual rectangular plan is similar to nearby Roman fortlets at Martinhoe and County Gate, leading to the suggestion that Shoulsbury may be Roman in origin. Very little evidence of Roman activity exists on Exmoor with only one Roman fort and the two fortlets identified. The likely entrances are from the west and south east corner, the inner enclosure extends to four acres, the outer six. There is a circular mound evident in the north east corner. This has been described as a Bronze Age barrow and was excavated as such before 1906 with nothing found There are various lumps and bumps enclosed which may be house platforms, a nearby water supply is from the river Bray.

Its location on Exmoor is likely to have been an extremely exposed, remote and inhospitable place in the Iron Age. Referred to by Daniel Defoe (1661-1731), "The Country is called Exmore, Cambden calls it a filthy, barren Ground, and indeed, so it is". In 1818 it was just outside an area of 20,000 acres described as, ‘His Majesty’s Allotment’ that contained one small farm and a few ancient track-ways.

Henry Wollcombe described the hillfort in an 1839 manuscript: "The whole inclosure is a complete morass incapable of being walked on. Indeed the whole hill is a bog and marshy and requires great care even in this dry season to pick your path. The parts with double ramparts was never a ditch, it was rather an esplanade for men to draw up on."
