= Charles, Devon =

Village in Devon, England

Coordinates: 51.100000°N 3.883333°W

Charles
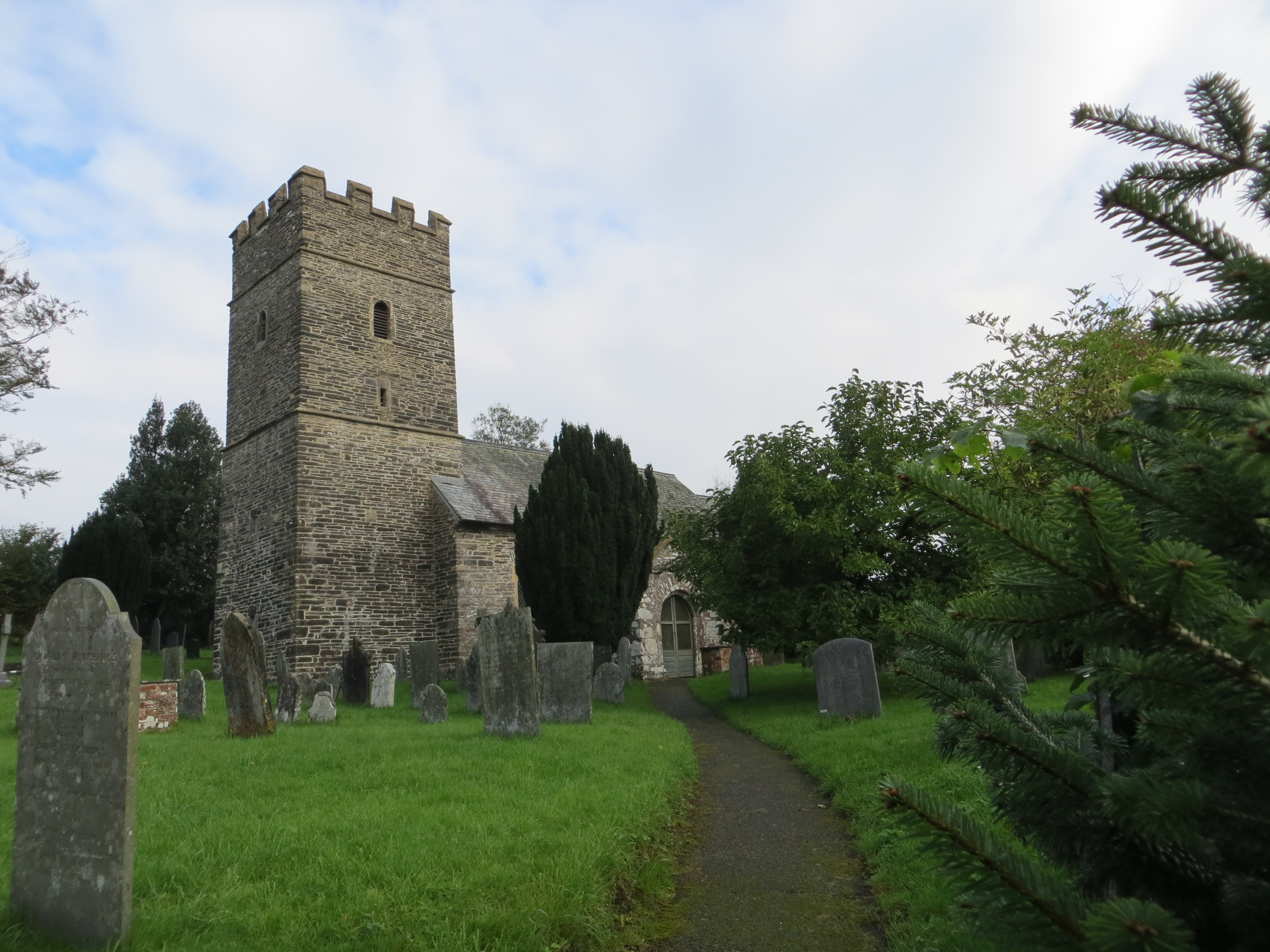
- The church of St John the Baptist at Charles

- Location within Devon
- OS grid reference: SS6822935098
- Civil parish: Brayford
- District: North Devon
- Shire county: Devon
- Region: South West
- Country: England
- Sovereign state: United Kingdom
- Post town: SOUTH MOLTON
- Postcode district: EX32 7
- Dialling code: 01769
- Police: Devon and Cornwall
- Fire: Devon and Somerset
- Ambulance: South Western
- UK Parliament: North Devon

Charles is a village and former civil parish, now in the parish of Brayford, in the North Devon district of Devon, England. Its nearest town is South Molton, which lies approximately 4.7 miles (7.6 km) south-east from the hamlet, just off the A399 road. In 1961 the parish had a population of 203. On 1 April 1986 the parish was abolished and merged with Brayford.
