= Almsworthy Common =

Area of Exmoor in Somerset, England

Coordinates: 51.1627°N 3.6559°W

Almsworthy Common is a small area of unenclosed land in Exmoor, south-western England. It contains a number of archaeological sites.

It is about 2 miles north of Exford roughly 0.5 km^{2} in area, and the Macmillan Way West passes through it, as does the parish boundary between Exford and Porlock. It reaches a height of 453 metres.

Stone settings are arrangements of upright stones either scattered randomly or in a roughly geometric pattern. They are the most common form of stone monument found on Exmoor, with 57 conclusively recorded examples in this area. A large number are known to have existed but have been destroyed.

560 m south west of Chetsford Bridge is a stone alignment. The archaeologist Aubrey Burl stated that an "eye of faith" was needed to identify "either a ring or a set of rows." The Ordnance Survey list it as a "Stone Circle" on their map. In his 1970 study of the archaeology of Exmoor, Leslie Grinsell thought that it was "probably" a stone circle.

The common is also the site of one of the best preserved hut circles on Exmoor.
