= River Batherm =

River in Somerset and Devon, England

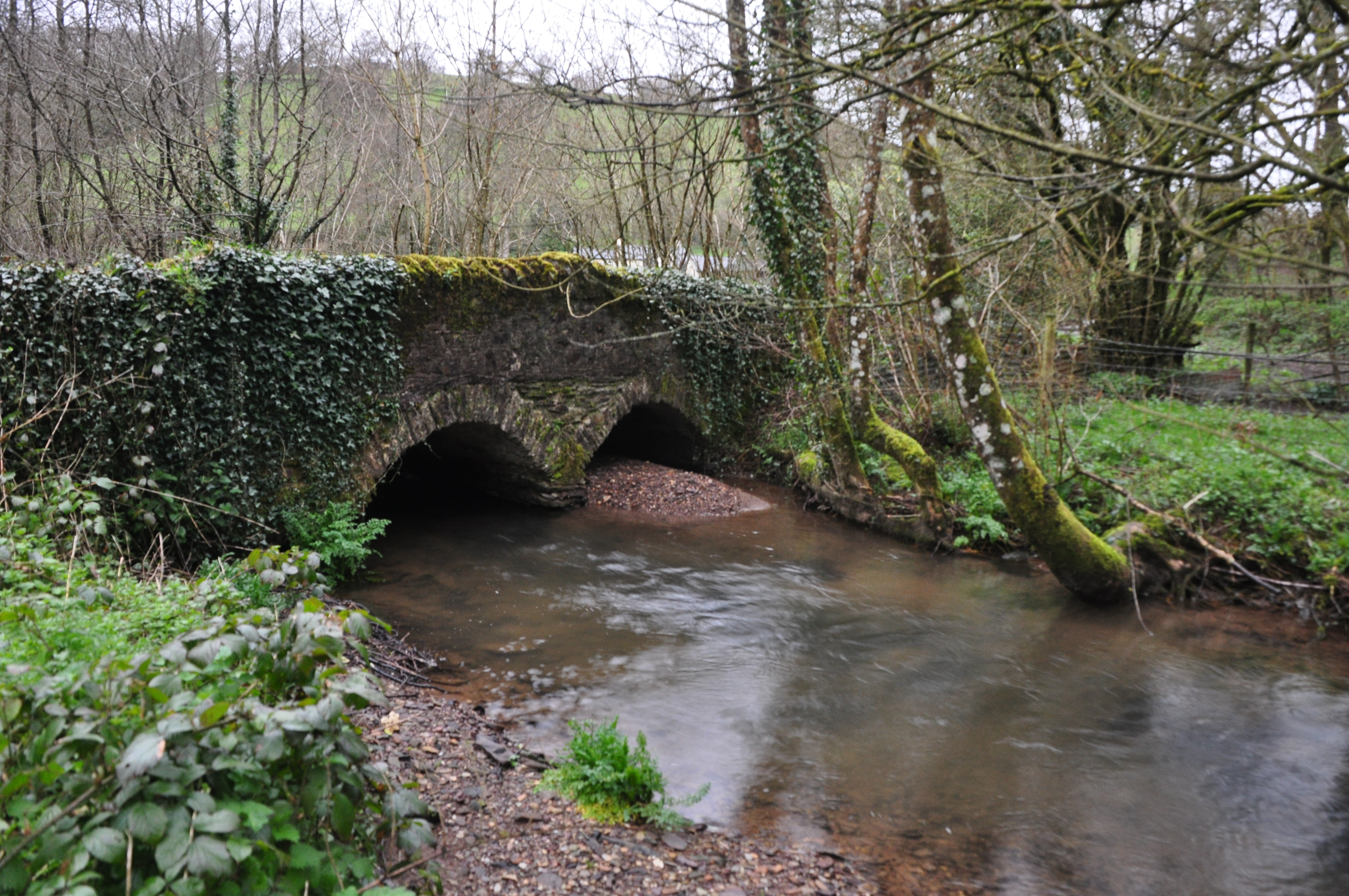
- Batherm Bridge near Petton

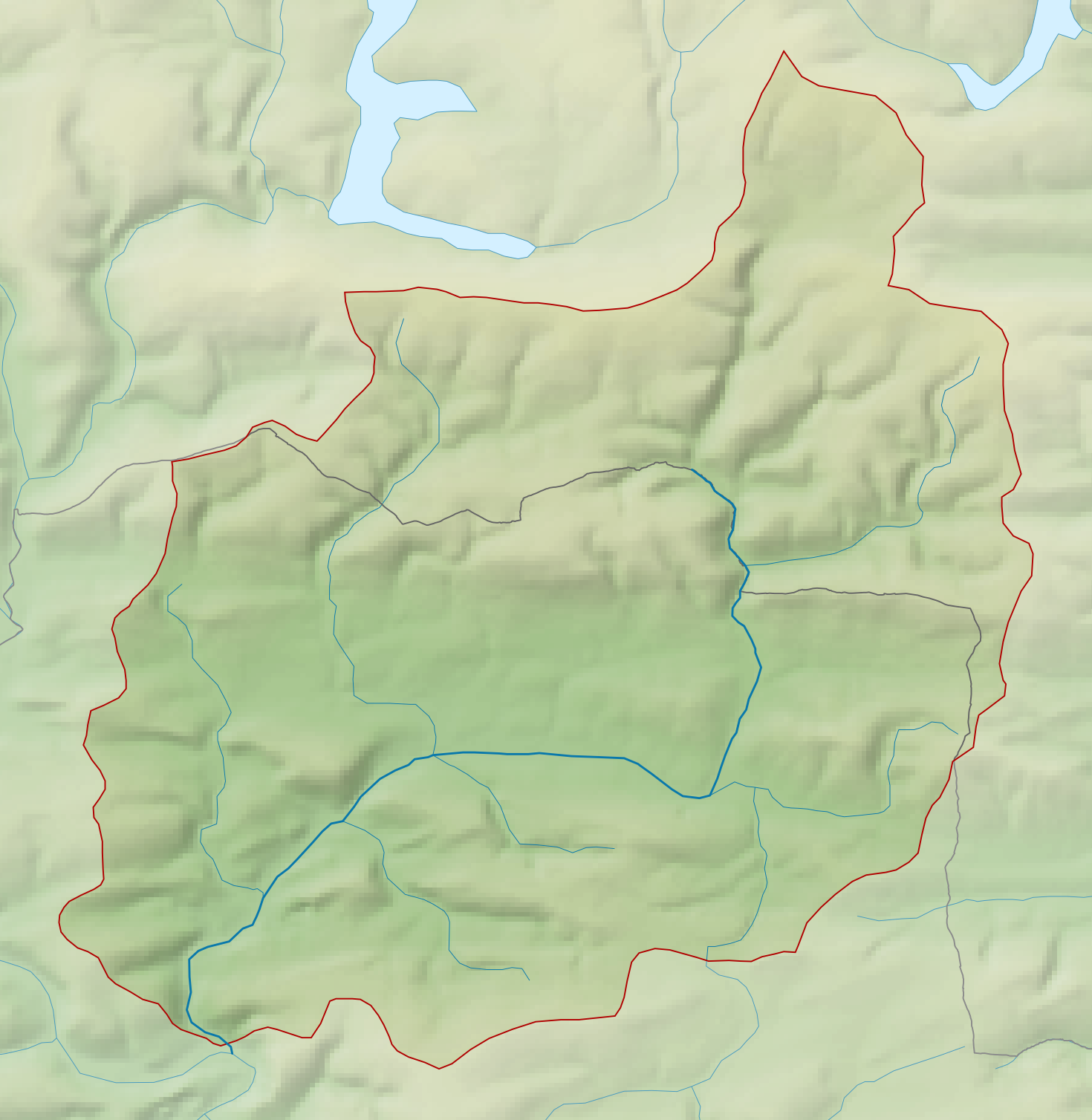
- Catchment map of the River Batherm

Location
- Country: England
- Counties: Devon, Somerset

Physical characteristics
- Source: Sperry Barton
  - location: Somerset, England
- Mouth: River Exe
  - location: Devon, England
  - coordinates: 50°58′33.75″N 3°29′13.9″W

The River Batherm is a river which flows through Somerset and Devon in England. The river rises on high ground near the village of Sperry Barton, between Wimbleball and Clatworthy reservoirs. It flows south through the villages of Blackwell, Petton, and Shillingford before it joins the River Exe just over a mile downstream from Bampton.
