= Knowle, Devon =

Village in Devon, England

Knowle
- Village
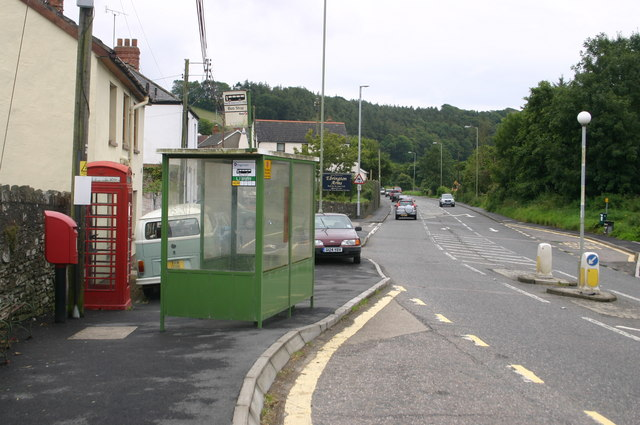
- A361 through Knowle

- Location within Devon Location within the United Kingdom
- Coordinates: 51.1264°N 4.1552°W
- Country: England
- County: Devon
- District: North Devon
- Time zone: UTC+0:00 (GST)

Knowle is a village near Braunton located on the A361 road between Ilfracombe and Barnstaple in North Devon, England. It is in the civil parish of Braunton. Knowle is situated near to the Iron Age fortification of Knowle Hill Castle.

== History ==
The number of inhabitants expanded considerably in the 1960s with the building of a large number of bungalows which nearly doubled the housing stock. At the time there was a push for people from the Midlands to relocate to ease the housing issues under a policy known as overspill.

The estate of about 50 bungalows were built by the local builder 'Jimmy' James Dennis whose had all his own trades and workers. He also ran his own sawmills and forestry to create the wood. Jimmy lived on the small hill above the new houses towards the C of E. He had built a cistern on the opposite hill, fed by a pipe laid into a stream from the top of the hill right across the village to his house.

Knowle had two churches; C of E at the top of the hill (closed) and a Methodist hall in the middle of the village. In the 1960s there was a small shop by the main road, separate post office, garage and a pub. Called the 'Ebrington Arms' excluding the pub. The rest have been merged into the garage. In the 70s the pub was changed with a single room from each side of a central front door and a bar that extended into each room. In the 1980s the pub was extensively modified to cater for food services.

About 0.5 miles from the village, at Winsham, there were three farms who maintained the fields with arable and dairy stocks. A small holding just outside of the village provide rabbits as a pet or for food.

The village shop was run in the 60s and 70s. As people didn't have supermarkets or many cars, the small shop, the local farmer, the small holder, and peoples own gardens, provided most of the necessities. For other items it was a bus ride to Braunton, Barnstaple, and all the way to Pannier Market especially in cattle market day.

In the village, also lives A.H. Slee, a published historian who had written several books. And Mr Bray, a former tech teacher who worked in a school in Barnstaple.

== Events ==
The village come together throughout the year often as a result of the local Women's Institute. To create the lorry floats for the children to enter the Braunton Carnival Parade, thousands of paper flowers was made over the years to decorate those floats.
