= Skilgate =

Village and civil parish in Somerset, England

Coordinates: 51.0378°N 3.4490°W

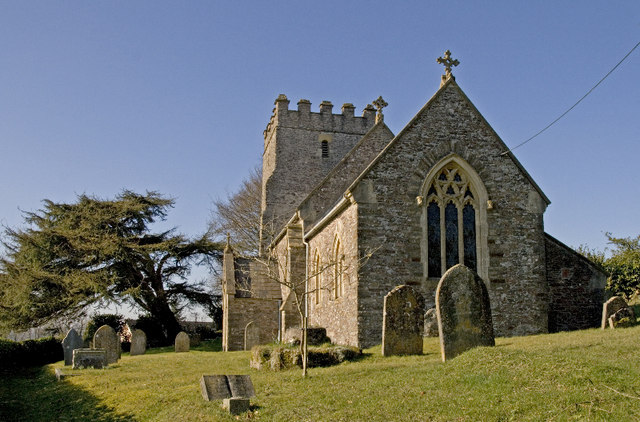
- St John the Baptist

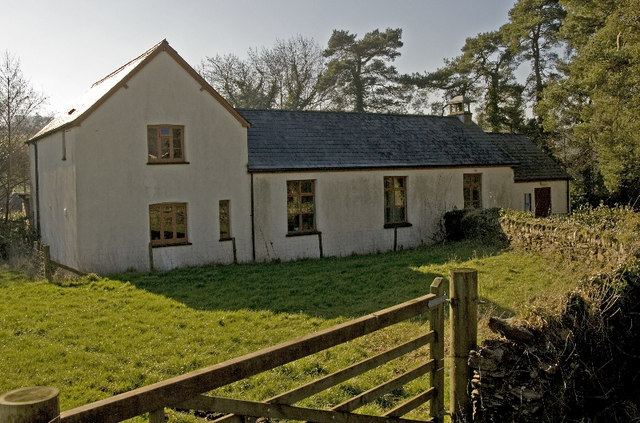
- Village Hall

- Location within Somerset
- Population: 96 (2001)
- OS grid reference: SS985275
- Unitary authority: Somerset Council
- Ceremonial county: Somerset
- Region: South West
- Country: England
- Sovereign state: United Kingdom
- Post town: Taunton
- Postcode district: TA4
- Police: Avon and Somerset
- Fire: Devon and Somerset
- Ambulance: South Western
- UK Parliament: Tiverton and Minehead

Skilgate is a village and civil parish 5 miles (8 km) east of Dulverton and 8 miles (13 km) west of Wiveliscombe in Somerset, England. It has a population of 96.

The parish, which covers an area of 866 ha, straddles the boundary of the Exmoor National Park lying on the southern edge of the Brendon Hills, and is close to the border with Devon.

== History ==
In the Domesday Book the village was recorded as Scheligate, possibly meaning 'the opening on the boundary'. At that time it was held by Robert de Gatemore under Roger Arundel along with another manor in the parish known as Milton. They passed in the 20th century to the Ferguson Davie baronets.

The parish of Skillgate was part of the Williton and Freemanners Hundred.

== Governance ==
The Parish Meeting has responsibility for local issues, there being no Parish Council.

For local government purposes, since 1 April 2023, the parish comes under the unitary authority of Somerset Council. Prior to this, it was part of the non-metropolitan district of Somerset West and Taunton (formed on 1 April 2019) and, before this, the district of West Somerset (established under the Local Government Act 1972). It was part of Dulverton Rural District before 1974.

It is also part of the Tiverton and Minehead county constituency represented in the House of Commons of the Parliament of the United Kingdom.

== Religious sites ==
The Church of St John has a 14th-century tower, but the rest of the church was rebuilt in 1872. It has been designated by English Heritage as a Grade II* listed building.
