= Stone settings (Exmoor) =

Prehistoric monuments found in Exmoor, England

Stone settings are a type of monument found in Exmoor, an area of heathland in south-western England. They consist of upright stones that are assembled together either in geometric patterns or seemingly random configurations.

Stone settings are the most common stone monuments to be found on Exmoor. As of 2001, there were 57 that had been conclusively identified. It is likely that the original number had been much higher, with many stones having been removed for use in walling, drainage, and gate posts or to allow a field to be used more easily for cultivation. Some of the solitary standing stones found on Exmoor may once have been part of these stone settings.

The archaeologist Aubrey Burl noted that they were "almost without parallel in Britain and Ireland". Ten of the known stone settings are rectangular in shape. Four are quincunxes, containing five stones each. The majority of the stone settings are not of a recognisable shape, either because they were originally designed in this manner or because they have been altered over time through the removal of different stones.
