= Challacombe =

Village in Devon, England

Coordinates: 51.153°N 3.869°W

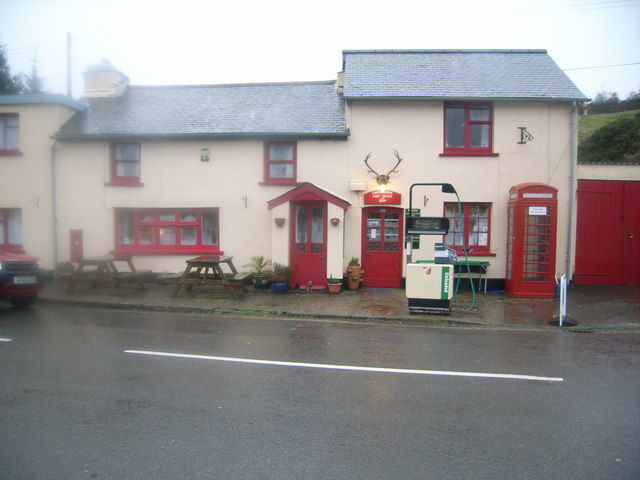

- Location within Devon
- Shire county: Devon
- Region: South West
- Country: England
- Sovereign state: United Kingdom
- Post town: Barnstaple
- Postcode district: EX31
- Police: Devon and Cornwall
- Fire: Devon and Somerset
- Ambulance: South Western
- UK Parliament: North Devon

Challacombe is a small village on the edge of the Exmoor National Park, in Devon, England. The village has a small general shop/Post Office and a single pub, the Black Venus. The village is on the B3358 road and is 5 miles west of Simonsbath.

== Landmarks ==
Believed to be the only inn in England bearing this name, The Black Venus Inn is an old stone-built pub, a historic 16th century building with low ceiling and original beams.

West Challacombe Manor is a medieval manor house in the area. It is described as a "white-washed house with rendered walls and Georgian framed windows on the south slope of Little Hangman Hill and looks like an archetypal Devon farmhouse rather than a medieval manor house." It was restored between 1993 and 1999. Also of note is the historic Packhorse Bridge and Challacombe Church.

The nearby Shoulsbury castle is an Iron Age hill fort.

== Etymology ==
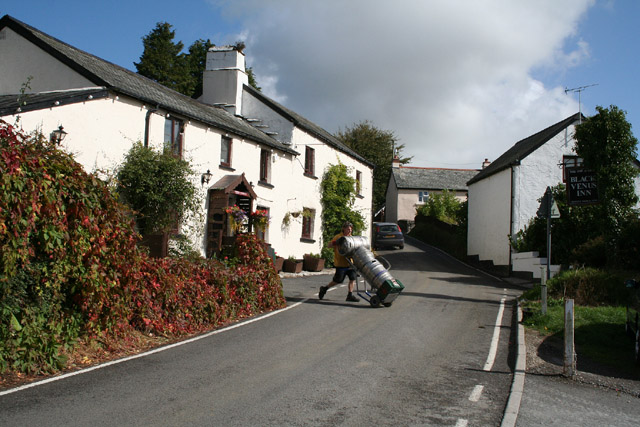
Challacombe, Simonsbath road at the Black Venus

The name 'Challacombe' literally means 'cold valley'. The name derives from the Old English words ceald ('cold') and cumb ('valley'). The village was recorded as Celdecomba in the Domesday Book.
