= Brayford =

Village in Devon, England

Coordinates: 51.09°N 03.88°W

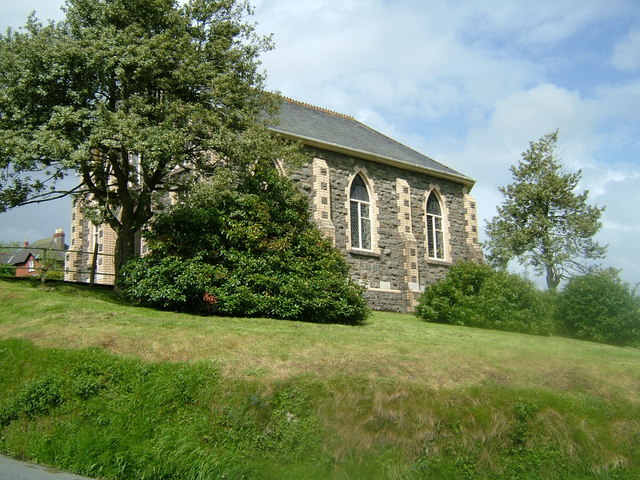
- Chapel in Brayford

- Location within Devon
- OS grid reference: SS6834
- Shire county: Devon
- Region: South West
- Country: England
- Sovereign state: United Kingdom
- Post town: Barnstaple
- Postcode district: EX32
- Police: Devon and Cornwall
- Fire: Devon and Somerset
- Ambulance: South Western
- UK Parliament: North Devon

Brayford is a village and civil parish in Devon, England, situated about 5 miles (8 km) from South Molton and 6 miles (10 km) from Barnstaple. It lies on Exmoor and sits beneath open areas of common land. It is a small rural community and in the surrounding area are many farms.

Brayford is around 1 mile from the hamlet of Charles and is also host to several quarries. The village can be found along the Ilfracombe - South Molton Road in North Devon, and is also near to the North Devon Link Road which connects the area with the M5. It is also located on the River Bray.

The large Brayford Quarry lies on the outskirts of the village. It is operated by Hansons but remains an asset of Archibald Nott & Sons.
