= Meshaw =

Village in Devon, England

Coordinates: 50.962441°N 3.769353°W

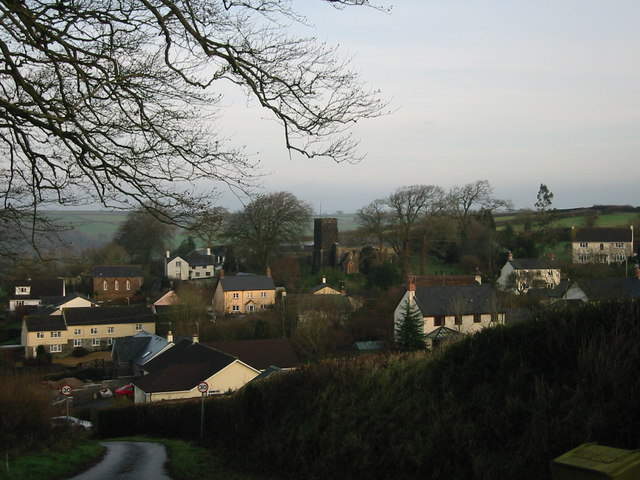

- Location within Devon
- Population: 151 (2001 census)
- OS grid reference: SS7584219604
- Civil parish: Meshaw
- District: North Devon
- Shire county: Devon
- Region: South West
- Country: England
- Sovereign state: United Kingdom
- Post town: SOUTH MOLTON
- Postcode district: EX36
- Police: Devon and Cornwall
- Fire: Devon and Somerset
- Ambulance: South Western
- UK Parliament: North Devon

Meshaw is a village and civil parish in the North Devon district of Devon, England. Its nearest town is South Molton, which lies approximately 5.9 miles (9.5 km) north-west from the village. The village lies just off the B3137 road. Meshaw also lies on the same B3137 road as Witheridge which is approximately 4.7 miles south-east of the village. In 2001 the population of the civil parish of Meshaw was 151.

Meshaw is a closely knit community with good links to the A361 via Gidley Cross. The local primary school is South Molton Junior School, with primary schools out of catchment such as Witheridge, East Worlington and Bishop's Nympton closer. The local secondary school is South Molton Community College which has an 'Outstanding Ofsted Report'.

== Courtenay monument ==
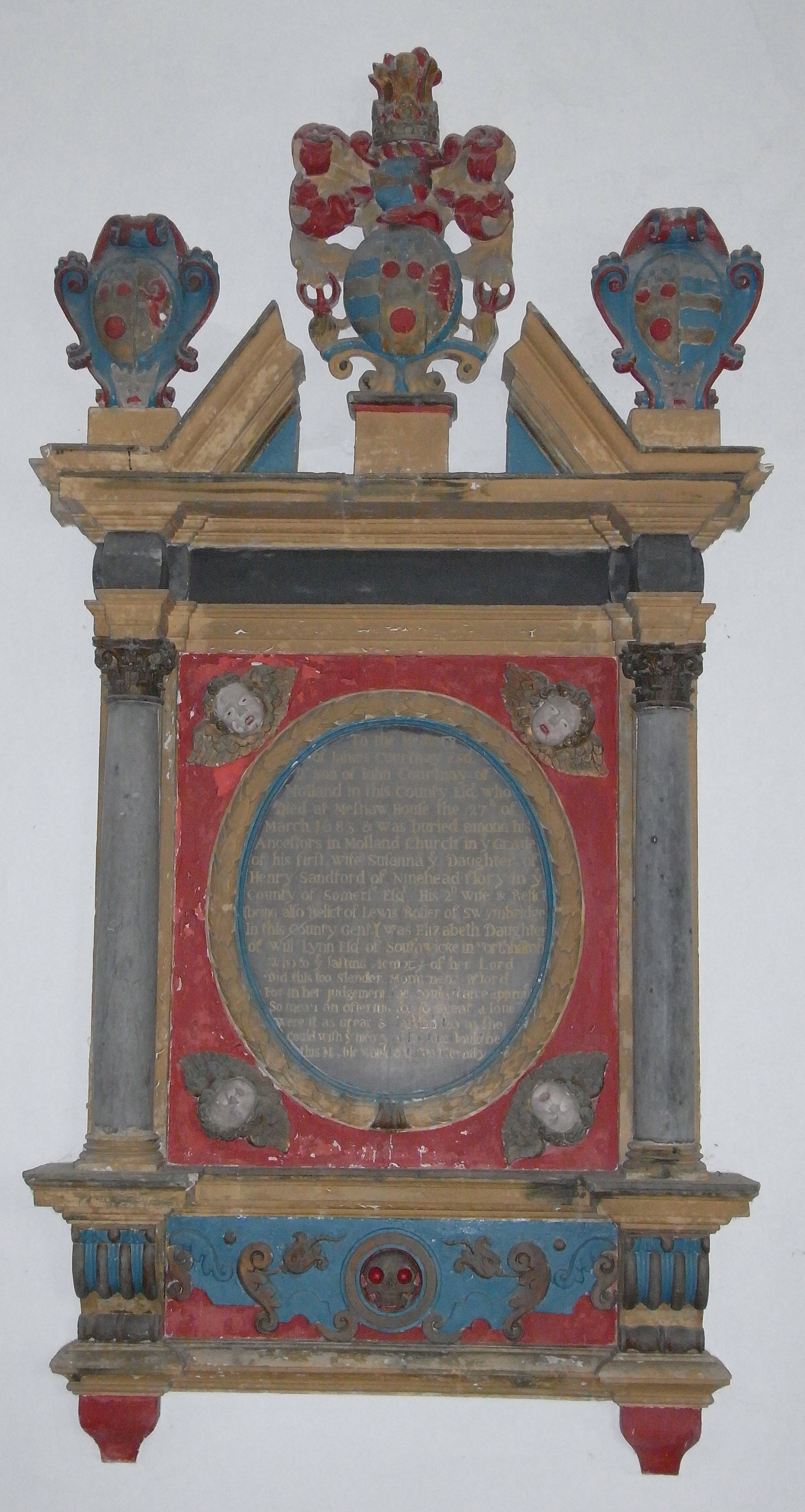
Mural monument to James Courtenay (d.1683) of Meshaw House

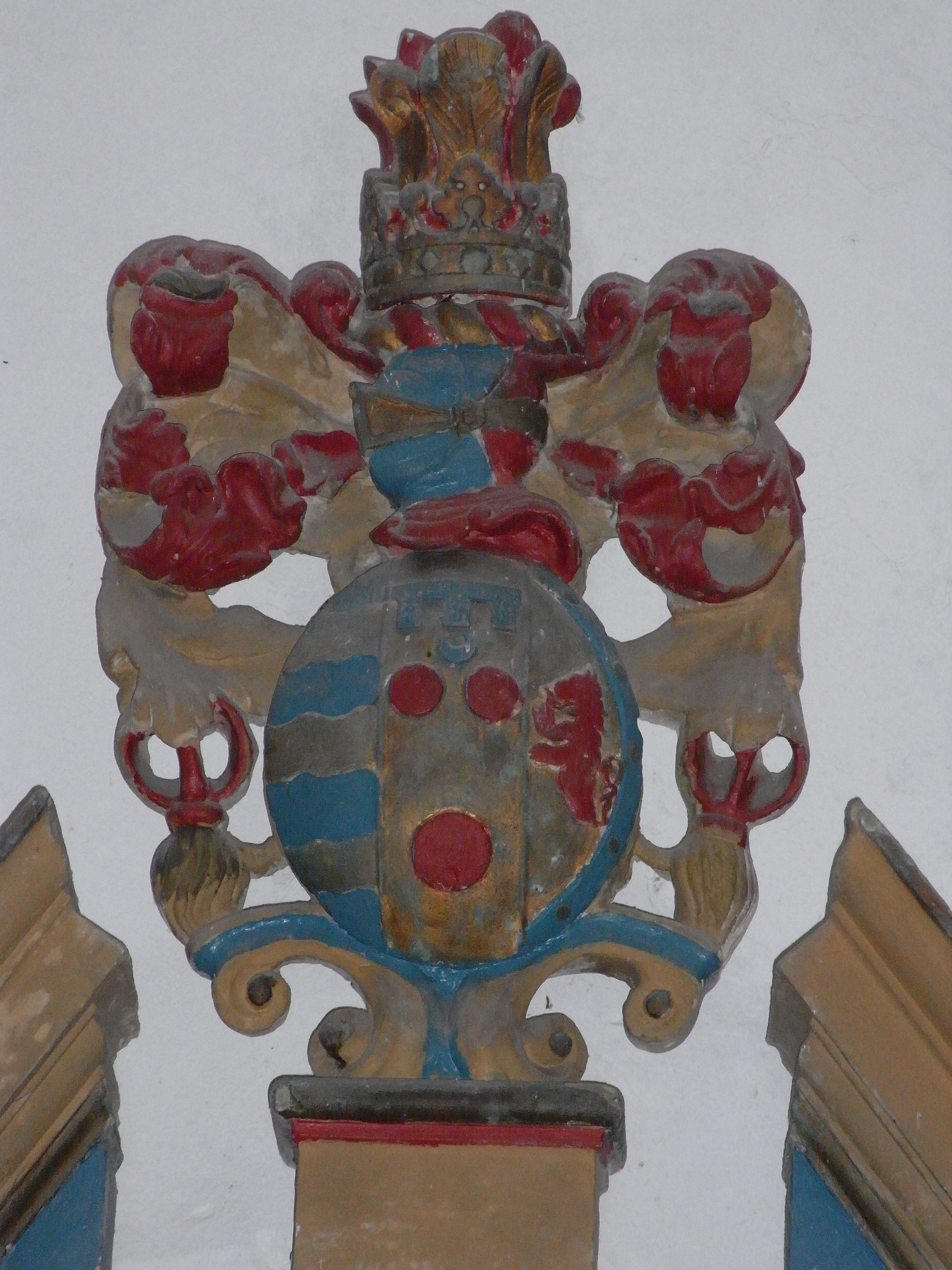
The heraldic achievement of James Courtenay (d.1683), Meshaw Church. A triple impalement: centre: Or, 3 torteaux a label of 3 points azure each point charged with 3 roundels in pale, differenced by a crescent azure (Courtenay of Molland, differenced for a second son); Dexter: Azure, 3 bars wavy argent (Sandford); Sinister: Or, a demi-lion rampant gules (Lynn). Crest: Out of a ducal coronet or, a plume of 7 ostrich feathers 4 and 3 argent (Courtenay)

In the church is a mural monument with the following wording: To the memory of James Courtnay (sic) Esq.r. 2d son of John Courtnay of Molland in this county, Esq.r. who died at Meshaw House the 27th of March 1683 & was buried among his ancestors in Molland Church in ye grave of his first wife Susanna ye daughter of Henry Sandford of Ninehead Flory in ye county of Somers.t, Esq.r. His 2d wife & relict (being also relict of Lewis Rosier of Swymbridge in this county, Gent.) was Elizabeth daughter of Will. Lynn Esq.r of Southwicke in Northha.ton.re who to ye lasting memory of her Lord did this too slender monument afford, for in her judgement she could scarce approve so mean an offering for so great a love. Were it as great and lasting too as she could wish ye me(m)ory of his love should be, this marble would out live eternity.

John Courtenay died on 26/2/1660 and his mural monument can be seen in Molland Church. The gravestone of James's first wife Susanna Sandford can be seen in the floor of the north aisle of Molland Church. She was the daughter of Henry Sandford (d.1644) of Nynehead Court, Somerset (whose gravestone exists in the chancel floor of Nynehead Church), by Mary Ayshford (1606–1662). Her brother John "Sanford" (1638–1711) inherited the estates of Ayshford Court, Burlescombe, Devon, from their mother's nephew John Ayshford (1641–1689), whose mural monument can be seen in the Ayshford Chapel. The originator of this monument at Meshaw was James Courtenay's second wife Elizabeth Lynn (d.1700), daughter of William Lynn of Southwick Hall, 11 miles SW of Peterborough, which family resided there between 1442 and 1840. Elizabeth had married James Courtenay as her second husband, having first married Lewis Rosier (d.1676) of Swimbridge, whose monument can be seen in St James's Church, Swimbridge. After James's death she married thirdly Philip Shapcote of Knowstone. Elizabeth was buried, according to her wishes, in the same tomb in Molland Church as her second husband James Courtenay, who had already been buried therein together with his first wife Susanna Sandford. This is made clear by her mural slate memorial tablet im Molland Church on the east wall of the north aisle which reads as follows: To ye memory of Mrs Shapcote ye wife of Philip Shapcote of Knowstone Esq. who was second wife & relict of James Courtenay Esq. and now lyes in (thistle?) interr(ed) in ye same grave with him according to his passionate desires & her pro(mise) to him in testimony of their mutual love. Obiit 12.o Nov. 1700. On the slate are engraved the arms of Shapcote 3 castles impaling Lynn Gules, a demi-lion rampant or. The crest over the escutcheon, which would normally be that of the husband, is here a demi-lion rampant, the crest of Lynn.

== Folk songs ==
Folk song collector Cecil Sharp first visited North Devon in 1904 at the invitation of Alex de Gex, rector of Meshaw. Over six visits between 1904 and 1905 he collected 32 songs from the singing of William Nott, a farmer who lived next door to Meshaw rectory. This was the most songs he collected from any one Devon singer.
