= Knowstone =

Village in Devon, England

Coordinates: 51°00′N 3°40′W

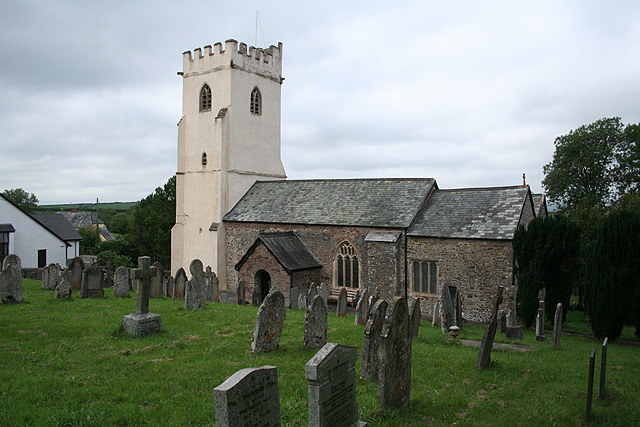
St Peter's Church, Knowstone

Knowstone is a village and civil parish situated in the North Devon district of Devon, England, halfway between the Mid Devon town of Tiverton, Devon and the North Devon town of South Molton. The hamlet of East Knowstone lies due east of the village. Knowstone was the birthplace of Admiral Sir John Berry (1635–1691), second son of Rev. Daniel Berry (1609–1654), vicar of Knowstone cum Molland. An elaborate mural monument erected by Sir John in 1684 to the memory of his parents survives in Molland Church.

The village lies on the route of the Two Moors Way and Celtic Way Exmoor Option.

== History ==
Knowstone appears to have included several separate manors at the time of the Domesday Book in 1086. It was within the jurisdiction of South Molton Hundred.

== Historic estates ==
The parish of Knowstone included three notable historic estates:

- Beaple, the home of the de Beaupel family, also of Landkey.
- Shapcott, the original home of the Shapcott family;
- Wadham, Knowstone the original home of the Wadhams, who took their name from the manor, later of Edge, Branscombe Devon, and then Merryfield, Ilton Somerset, the most prominent of whom was Nicholas Wadham (1531/2– 1609), who with his wife Dorothy Wadham was the co-founder of Wadham College, Oxford.

== Domesday Book ==
In the Domesday Book of 1086 Knowstone has four entries:

- Chenuestan, held by Rolf from the overlord Walter of Douai, feudal baron of Bampton, Devon and of Castle Cary, Somerset, formerly held by Algar (1/2 a hide, 7 ploughs);
- Chenuestan, held by Rolf from the overlord Walter of Douai, formerly held by Leofwin (3 furlongs, 4 ploughs);
- Chenudestane, held from the king by Algar, who held it before 1066 also, listed in the section covering the King's thanes (1 virgate, 3 ploughs) This holding was thought by O.J. Reichel (1894) to represent the later named "Shapcote", but he provided no evidence for his opinion.
- Wadeham; A fourth separate entry exists for the apparently separate manor of Wadham, held from the king by his thane Ulf both before and after 1066 (1 virgate, 3 ploughs).

== Mediaeval period ==
=== Beaple ===
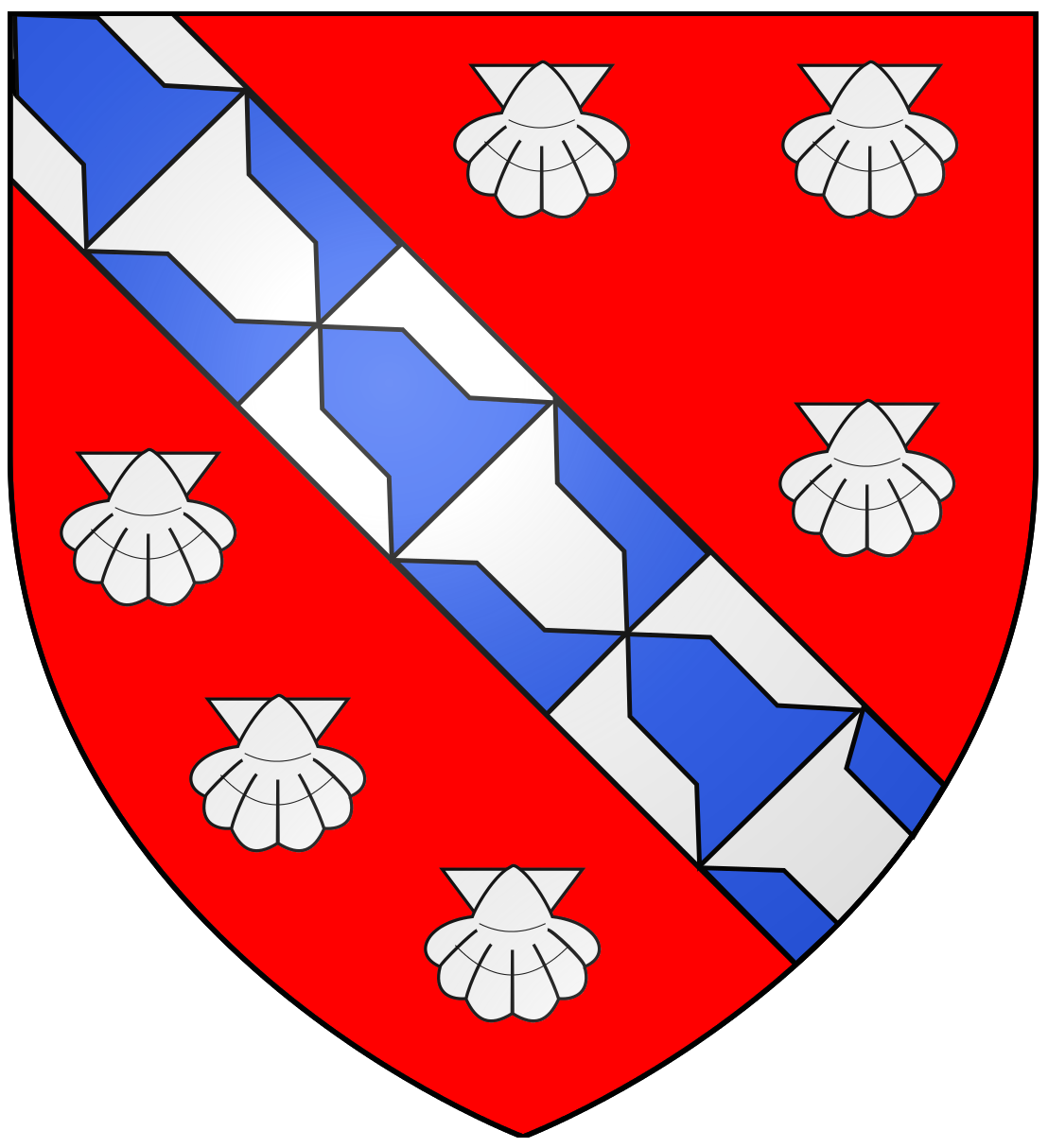
Arms of Beaupel of Landkey and Knowstone: Gules, a chevron vair between six escallops argent

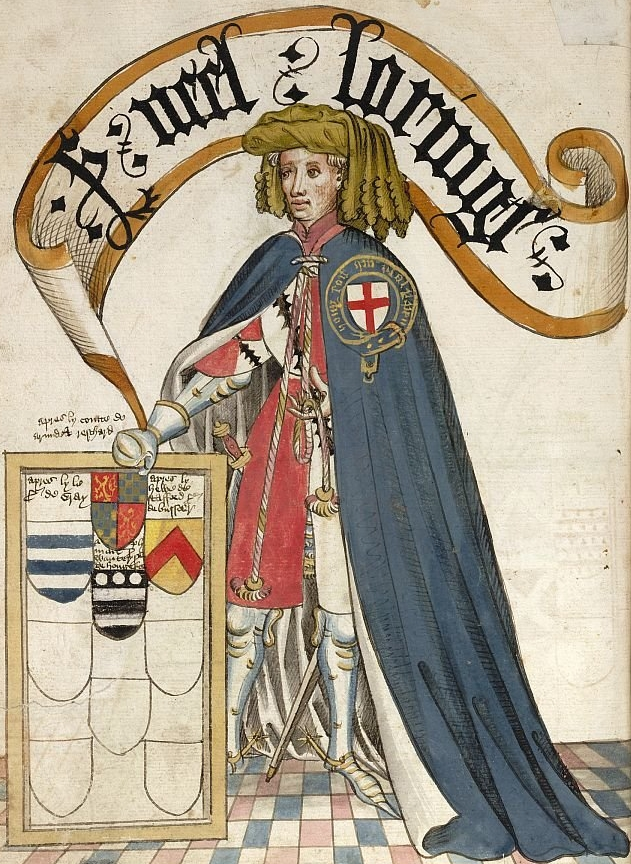
"Sr Neel Loringe": Sir Nele Loring, KG, shown wearing his garter robes over his tunic showing the arms: Quarterly argent and gules, a bendlet engrailed sable. Illustration from the 1430 "Bruges Garter Book" made by William Bruges (1375–1450), first Garter King of Arms

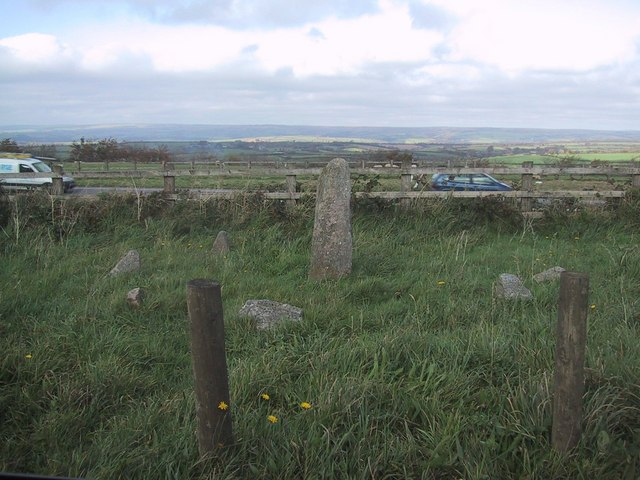
Ancient standing stone on Beaple's Moor, Knowstone, showing vehicles on the North Devon Link Road behind

Tristram Risdon writing in about 1630 stated that in the time of King Henry II (1154–1189) the lord of the manor of "Knowston" was Ailmer de Brett, who granted it to Richard Beaple "whose posterity made this place their dwelling, of which family were divers knights". In the Book of Fees it is recorded that Richard Beupel held "Cnuston" from the feudal barony whose caput was at Marshwood, in Dorset held until the early 13th. century by the Mandeville family, Earls of Essex. In the parish church of Landkey there exist three stone effigies of the Beupel family who held that manor also from the See of Exeter. One of these estates was acquired together with the neighbouring manor of Molland by William de Bottreaux, who gave both churches to Hartland Abbey in 1160. The estate of Beaple was inherited from his wife Margaret de Beaupel by Sir Nele Loring, KG (c.1320–1386) one of the founding members and 20th Knight of the Order of the Garter, established by King Edward III in 1348. He married Margaret de Beaupel, the daughter, and apparently the heiress, of Sir Ralph de Beaupel. There exists today about 1 mile SW of Knowstone village the still-important farmhouse called "Beaple's Barton", bordered to the south by Beaple's Moor and to the north by Beaple's Wood. He appears in ancient records as "Nele Loring of Knowston-Beaupell". By marriage he also came to hold the manor of Landkey, 2 miles east of Barnstaple and 16 miles west of Knowstone. They had the following progeny, two daughters and co-heiresses:

- Isabel,(d. 21 August 1400) who married twice:
  - Firstly to Sir William Cogan before 1382.
  - Secondly, in about 1383, to Sir Robert Harington, 3rd Baron Harington (1357–1406), son of John Harington, 2nd Baron Harington (1307–1363), by Joan de Bermingham. Isabel's son by her second marriage was John Harington, 4th Baron Harrington (1384–1418), whose very high quality and well-preserved alabaster effigy exists in the Church of St Dubricius, Porlock, Somerset.
- Margaret, the wife of John Peyvre of Tuddington (Toddington) in Bedfordshire.

On the division of Loring's lands between his co-heiresses Beaple fell to the lot of Lord Harrington, whose heiress brought it to the family of Bonville, whose heiress brought it to the Grey family, which forfeited all its lands to the crown on the execution of the Duke of Suffolk and his daughter Lady Jane Grey. From the crown the manor was purchased by Robert Pollard, a younger son of the judge Sir Lewis Pollard (c.1465–1526) of King's Nympton, Justice of the Common Pleas and MP for Totnes. According to Risdon, Robert Pollard made it his family's home for many generations" but certainly by 1653 it had passed to the ownership of the Courtenay family of Molland, as a deed of that date includes the manor of "Knowstone Beaples" in a long list of properties transferred into trust by John Courtenay and his wife Margaret.

=== Shapcott ===
==== Shapcott family ====
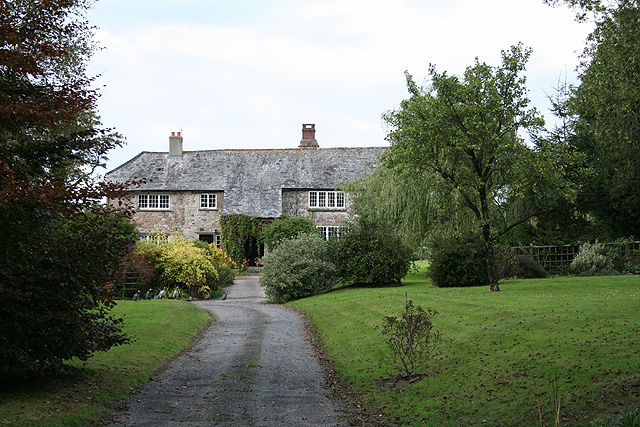
Shapcott Barton, Knowstone. The present farmhouse is mainly Elizabethan but retains mediaeval parts

Thomas Shapcote (d.1665), Lord of the Manor of East Knowstone, of Shapcott in the parish of Knowstone and of Exeter, gentleman and attorney was accused during the Commonwealth, together with his son Philip Shapcott (1621–1703), of being delinquents (i.e. staunch Royalists) and were required to declare their assets and income. These included the estate of Shapcott, which was worth £45 per annum and the tithes from the parish of Ashburton, worth £110 per annum. He declared his total estate to be £575 8s 8d and was fined £328. He was summoned again by the Committee in 1651 and fined a further £300, which was not however enforced. He married Urith Sotherin (d.1660), who was buried in Exeter Cathedral in 1660. Thomas died in 1665 and was buried in Exeter Cathedral beside his wife. He had the following children by his wife Urith Sotherin:

- Philip Shapcott (1621–1703) had also been a Royalist and was fined £40. He served as Recorder of South Molton for 45 years, Town Clerk of Plymouth for three years and was Deputy Recorder of Totnes in 1681. He died at Knowstone aged 82, where his gravestone is displayed in the vestry (formerly the Shapcott Chapel) of Knowstone Church, inscribed: Hic Reconditur quod mortale est Philippi Shapcote de Shapcote Armigeri qui obiit 31 Aug Anno 1703 Aetatis suo 82 ("Here is concealed the mortal remains of Philip Shapcote of Shapcote, Esquire, who died on Aug 31 in the year 1703 of his age 82"). He married four times:
  - Firstly at Barnstaple in 1649 to Hannah Tuckerin (d.1653/4).
  - Secondly at Stoke Damerel in 1660 to Anne Martyn
  - Thirdly in 1668 to Catherine Bowden.
  - Fourthly to Elizabeth Lynn (d.1700), as her third husband, widow of James Courtenay (d.1683), as his second wife, of Meshaw, 2nd son of John Courtenay (d.1660) of Molland Elizabeth was the daughter of William Lynn of Southwick Hall, 11 miles SW of Peterborough, which family resided there between 1442 and 1840.
- Mary Shapcote, married Thomas Southcott (1615–1663) of Calwoodleigh, Devon.
- Urith Shapcote (b.1617), wife of Sir Courtenay Pole, 2nd Baronet (1619–1695) of Shute, Devon. The arms of Pole impaling Shapcott (Sable, a chevron between three dovecotes argent) are shown in the east window of the north aisle of Shute Church.

According to Hoskins the last of the Shapcotts died at Exeter in about 1770 when the estate was sold out of the family. In 1810 the manor of Knowstone was owned by "George Courtenay" of Molland i.e. Sir George Courtenay Throckmorton, 6th Baronet (1754–1826), who inherited the baronetcy from his brother in 1819 and who had adopted the surname Courtenay, from which family the Throckmortons had inherited Molland, discontinued by his descendants.

Another contemporary branch of the Shapcott family settled at Bradninch in Devon, represented by Henry Shapcote who married Wilmot Hill and was father of Robert Shapcote (b.1621), MP, who married Anne Walrond, daughter of Henry Walrond of the influential Walrond family of Bradfield House, in Uffculme, Devon, today one of the largest mansions in Devon.

==== Monument of James Courtenay (d.1683) at Meshaw ====
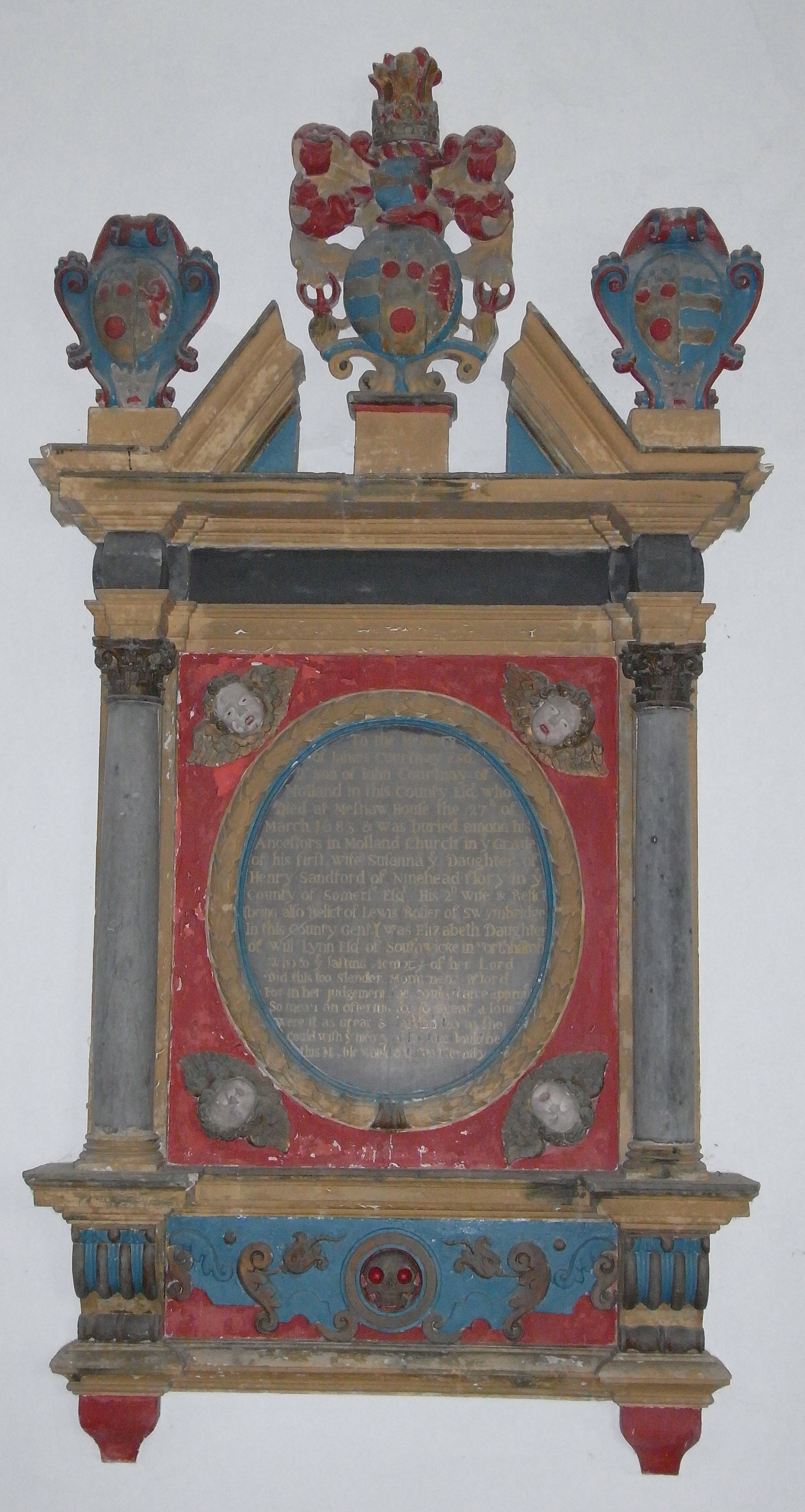
Mural monument in Meshaw Church to James Courtenay (d.1683) of Meshaw House

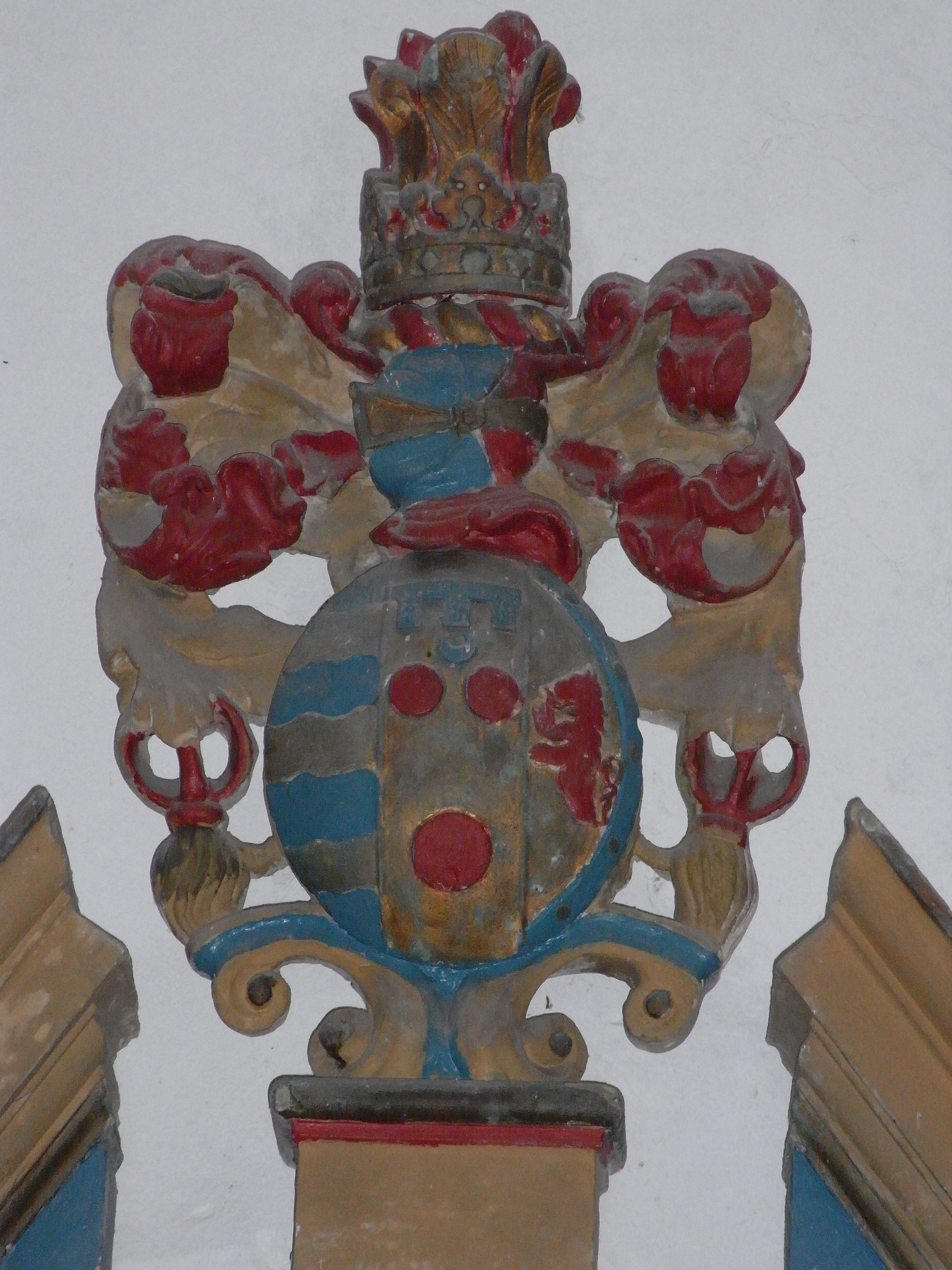
The heraldic achievement of James Courtenay (d.1683), Meshaw Church. A triple impalement: centre: Or, 3 torteaux a label of 3 points azure each point charged with 3 roundels in pale, differenced by a crescent azure (Courtenay of Molland, differenced for a second son); Dexter: Azure, 3 bars wavy argent (Sandford); Sinister: Or, a demi-lion rampant gules (Lynn). Crest: Out of a ducal coronet or, a plume of 7 ostrich feathers 4 and 3 argent (Courtenay)

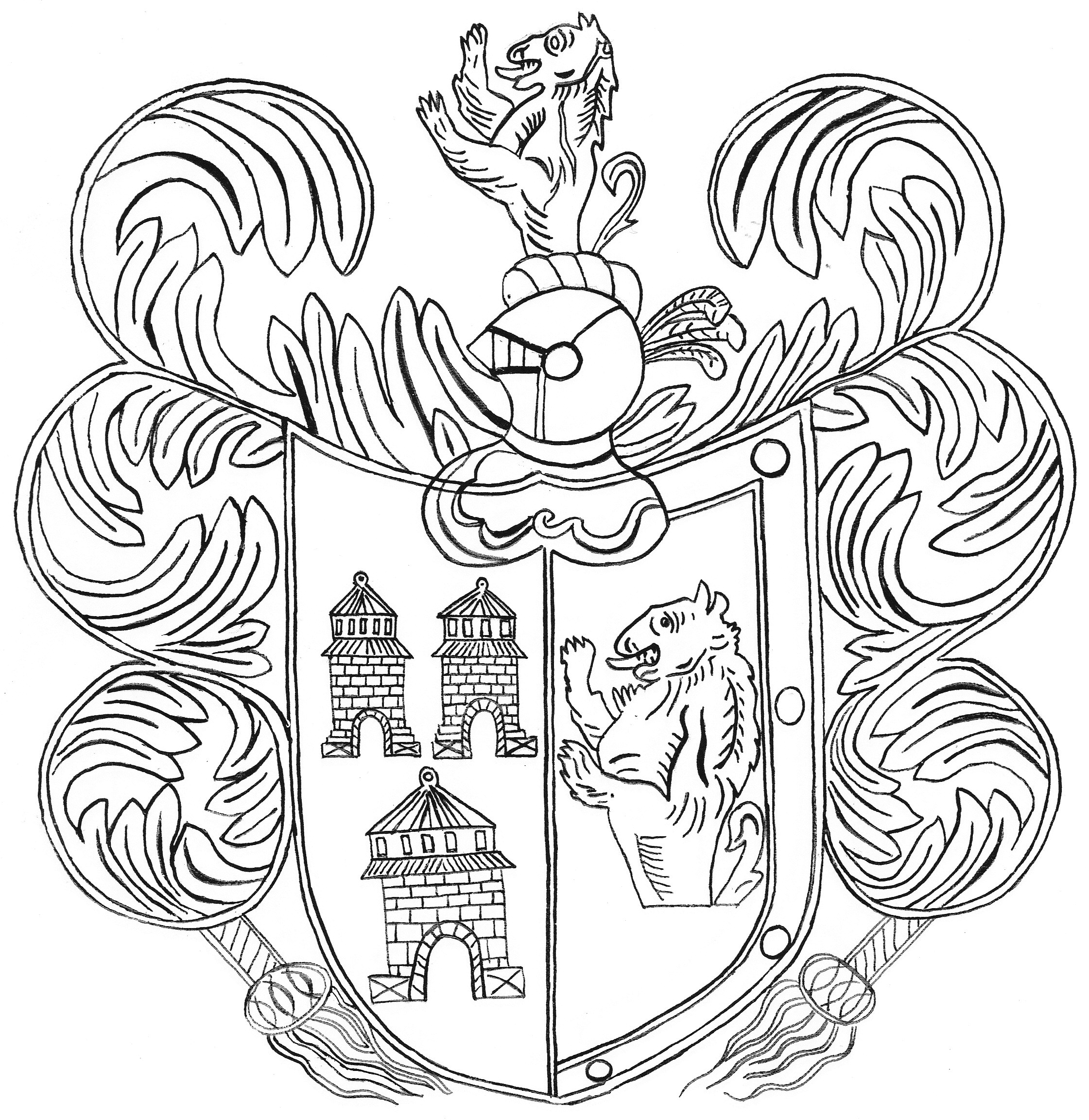
Arms of Mrs Elizabeth Shapcote (d.1700) in Molland Church. Born Elizabeth Lynn of Southwick Hall, Peterborough, she married as her second husband James Courtenay of Meshaw and thirdly Philip Shapcote, Esq, of Knowstone. The arms are Sable, three dovecots argent (Shapcote) impaling argent, a demi-lion gules within a bordure bezantee (Lynn)

In the church of Meshaw is a mural monument with the following wording: To the memory of James Courtnay (sic) Esq.r. 2d son of John Courtnay of Molland in this county, Esq.r. who died at Meshaw House 27 March 1683 & was buried among his ancestors in Molland Church in ye grave of his first wife Susanna ye daughter of Henry Sandford of Ninehead Flory in ye county of Somers.t, Esq.r. His 2d wife & relict (being also relict of Lewis Rosier of Swymbridge in this county, Gent.) was Elizabeth daughter of Will. Lynn Esq.r of Southwicke in Northha.ton.re who to ye lasting memory of her Lord did this too slender monument afford, for in her judgement she could scarce approve so mean an offering for so great a love. Were it as great and lasting too as she could wish ye me(m)ory of his love should be, this marble would out live eternity.

The gravestone of his first wife Susanna Sandford can be seen in the floor of the north aisle of Molland Church. She was the daughter of Henry Sandford (d.1644) of Nynehead Court, Somerset (whose gravestone exists in the chancel floor of Nynehead Church), by Mary Ashford, heiress of Burlescombe, Devon. The originator of this monument at Meshaw was James Courtenay's second wife Elizabeth Lynn (d.1700), daughter of William Lynn of Southwick Hall, 11 miles SW of Peterborough, which family resided there between 1442 and 1840. Elizabeth had married James Courtenay as her second husband, having first married Lewis Rosier (d.1676) of Swimbridge, whose monument can be seen in St James's Church, Swimbridge. After James's death she married thirdly Philip Shapcote of Knowstone. Elizabeth was buried, according to her wishes, in the same tomb in Molland Church as her second husband James Courtenay, who had already been buried therein together with his first wife Susanna Sandford. This is made clear by her mural memorial tablet of stone covered with slate-coloured gesso in Molland Church on the east wall of the north aisle which reads as follows: To ye memory of Mrs Shapcote ye wife of Philip Shapcote of Knowstone Esq. who was second wife & relict of James Courtenay Esq. and now lyes in (thistle?) interr(ed) in ye same grave with him according to his passionate desires & her pro(mise) to him in testimony of their mutual love. Obiit 12.o Nov. 1700. On the base of the tablet are engraved the arms of Shapcote Sable, 3 dovecotes argent impaling Lynn Argent, a demi-lion gules within a bordure bezantee The crest over the escutcheon, which would normally be that of the husband, is here a demi-lion rampant, clearly a repetition of the Lynn arms.

=== Wadham ===
Wadham, according to Hoskins (1959), was the original home of the Wadham family (originally de Wadham) later of Branscombe, Devon and Merrifield, near Ilton, Somerset, the most prominent of whom and the last in the male line was Nicholas Wadham (1531/2– 1609), who with his wealthy wife Dorothy Petre was the founder of Wadham College, Oxford. It is a historical rarity as in the Domesday Book of 1086, listed as WADEHAM, it was held by Ulf, one of the Saxon thanes of King William the Conqueror, who had held it since before the Norman Conquest of 1066. In the reign of King Henry IV (1399–1413) the estates of East Wadham and West Wadham were possessed by Sir John Wadham, from whom it descended to the heirs general of Nicholas Wadham."

== St Peter's Church, Knowstone ==
The church tower is said to have been built by Elizabeth Lynn (d.1700), the wife of Philip Shapcott Esq., one of Their Majesties Justices of the Peace for the County of Devon. It was in situ by 1691. Ever since the churches of both Molland and Knowstone had been given to Hartland Abbey by William de Bottreaux, which grant was confirmed by King Richard I in 1190, the two churches and parishes were under the care of a single priest. Two mural monuments exist in the parish church, one in memory of Rev. John Culme (d.1691), on the south wall of the chancel, the other to the young Philip Shapcote (d.1690):

=== Culme monument ===
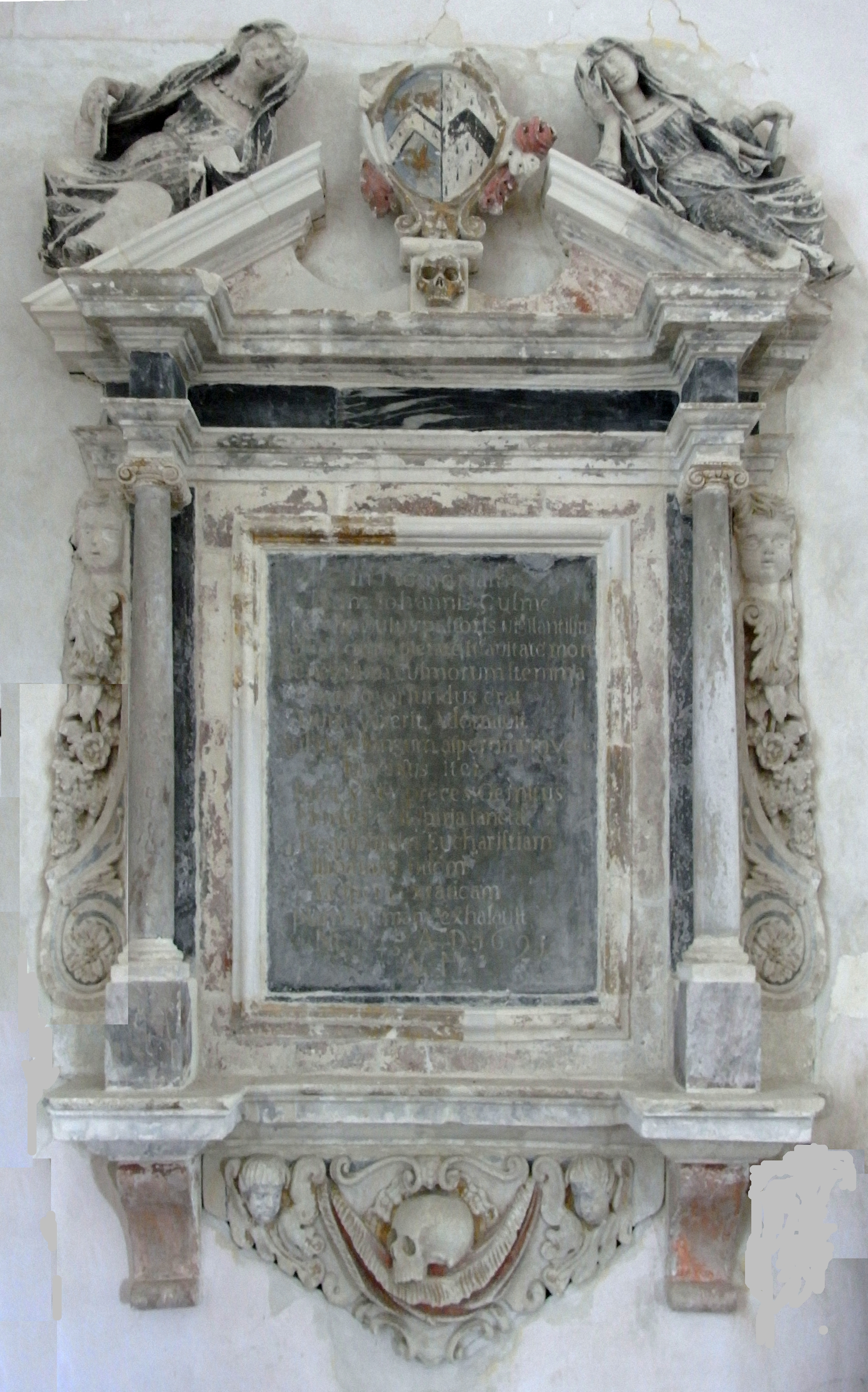
Mural monument to Rev. John Culme (d.1691), St Peter's Church, Knowstone. The armorials above are Azure, a chevron ermine between 3 pelicans vulning their breasts or (Culme) impaling ermine, a chevron sable (arms of his wife's family, unknown)

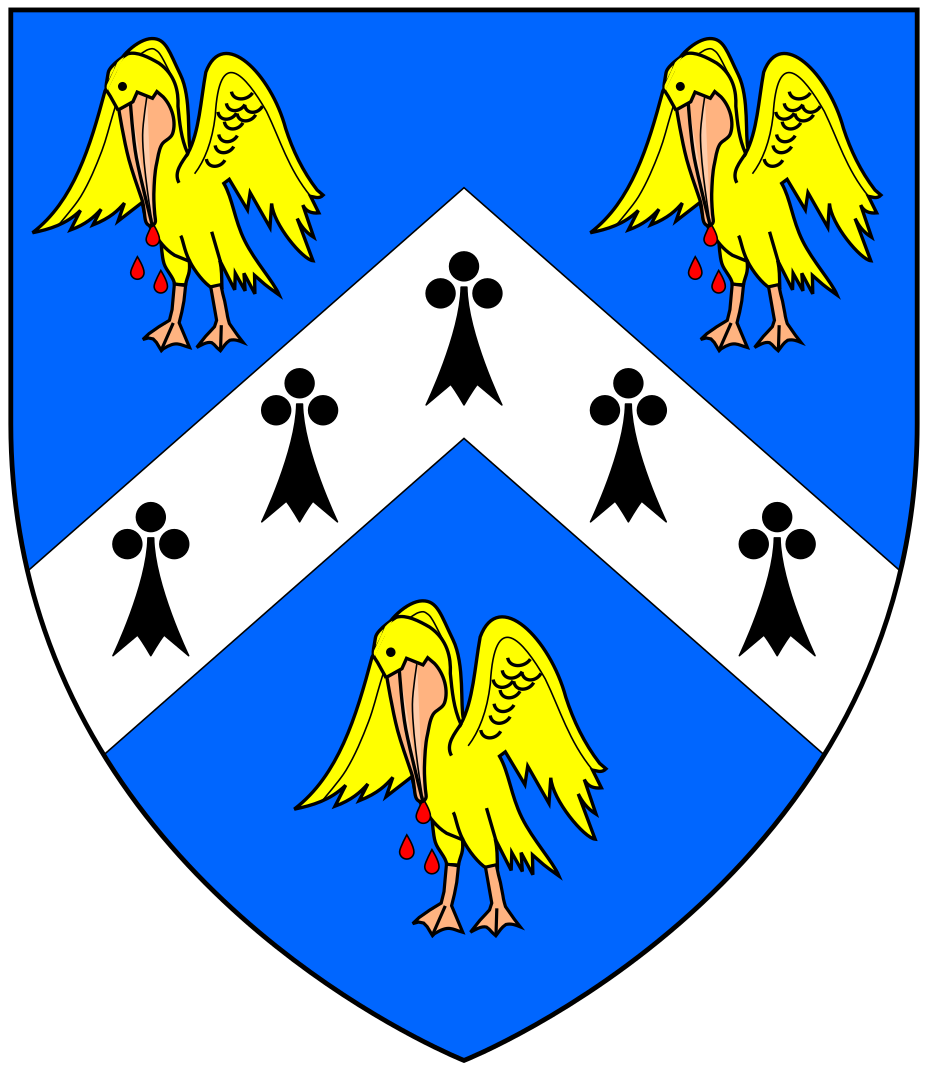
Arms of Culme: Azure, a chevron ermine between 3 pelicans vulning their breasts or

The Culme family held the sub-manor of Great Champson in Molland and acquired Canonsleigh Abbey after the Dissolution of the Monasteries. They were for a time patrons of the livings of both united parishes, perhaps because the Courtenay family, Lords of the Manor of Molland, were disallowed from exercising their right of presentation due to their long adherence to the Roman Catholic faith, and at some time leased the advowson to Rev. John Froude. The text of the sermon preached at the funeral of Rev. John Culme on 2 December 1691 is extant. The inscription is as follows:

“In memoriam Dom(inus) Johannes Culme …. huius pastoris vigilantissimus qui doctrina pietate suavitate moruit. Generosum Culmorum stemma ex quo oriundus erat dum vixerit adornavit qui non longum asperimum, vero emensus iter inter vola preces. Gemitus monita et suspiria sancta beatissimam Eucharistiam illibatam fidem et spem extaticam piam animam exhalavit Nov. 26 A.D. 1691. A.M.”

(In memory of John Culme, the most vigilant pastor of this flock, who died gently in pious doctrine. Whilst he lived he adorned the noble stock of the Culmes from which he arose; Who not a long harsh groan did he exhale, in truth freed from errors, prayers, warnings and sighs towards the most blessed Eucharist.....He breathed forth undiminished faith and hope his pious spirit....on Nov. 26 A.D. 1691)

=== Shapcote monument ===
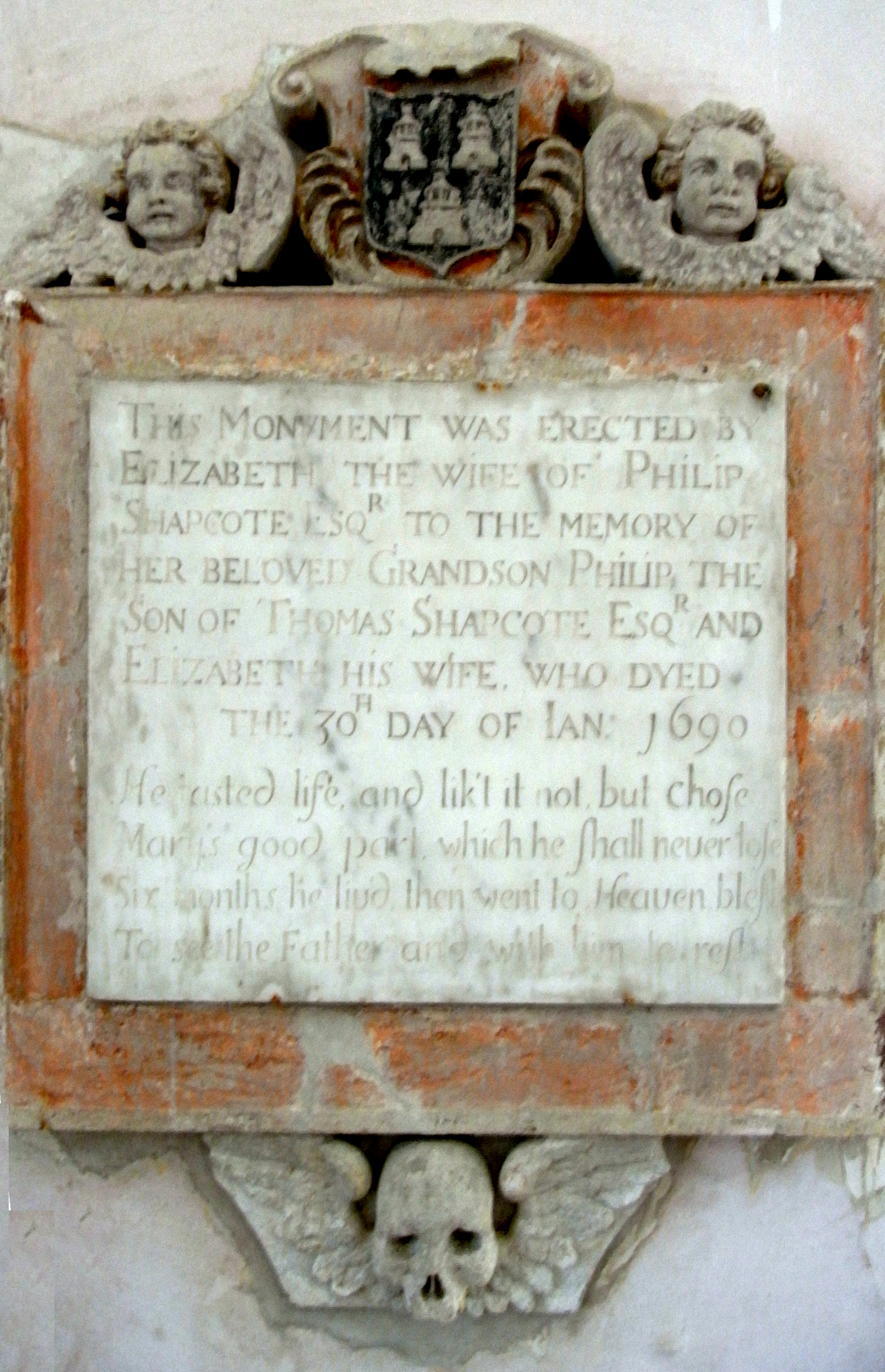
Mural monument to the infant Philip Shapcote (d.1690), St Peter's Church, Knowstone. The Shapcote arms are shown above: Sable, three dovecotes argent

Monument to the 6-month-old infant Philip Shapcote (jnr) (d.1690), erected by his step-grandmother Elizabeth Lynn (d.1700):

“This monument was erected by Elizabeth the wife of Philip Shapcote Esq.r To the memory of her beloved grandson Philip the son of Thomas Shapcote Esq.r and Elizabeth his wife who dyed the 30th day of Jan. 1690
He tasted life and lik't it not but chose
Mary's good parl which he shall never lose
Six months he liv'd then went to Heaven blest

To see the Father and with him to rest"

== Notable residents ==
- Rev John Froude II (1777-1852), Vicar of Molland-cum-Knowstone, an extreme example of the "hunting parson".
