= Church of All Saints, Nynehead =

Church in Somerset, England

Church of All Saints
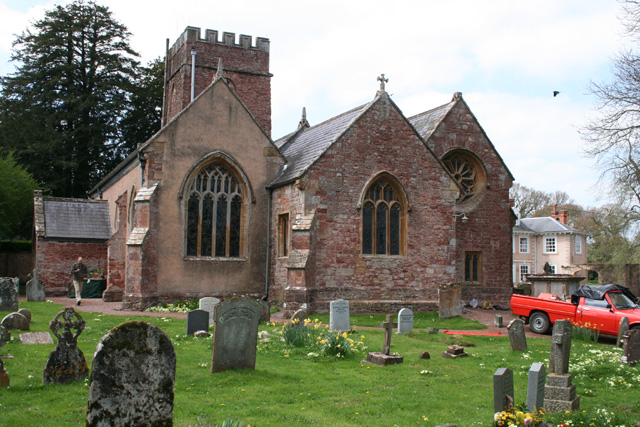

- Location within Somerset

General information
- Location: Nynehead, England
- Coordinates: 50.9974°N 3.2300°W
- Completed: 13th century

The 'Church of All Saints in Nynehead, Somerset, England dates from the 14th century and has been designated as a Grade I listed building.

The church is a small structure built of mostly of local red Permo-Triassic rock, probably on the site of an earlier church. In 1091 the manor and church were granted to Montacute Priory.

The two-stage square tower was built in the late 14th century and contains six bells, the oldest of which was cast around 1500. New aisles were added in 1410.

The interior of the church contains some monuments to the Sanford family of Nynehead Court.

The church had significant restoration carried out in 1869.

The parish is part of the Wellington and district benefice within the Tone deanery.

== See also ==
- List of Grade I listed buildings in Taunton Deane
- List of towers in Somerset
- List of ecclesiastical parishes in the Diocese of Bath and Wells
