= Ayshford Chapel =

Private chapel in Ayshford, Devon, England

Coordinates: 50.9285°N 3.3556°W

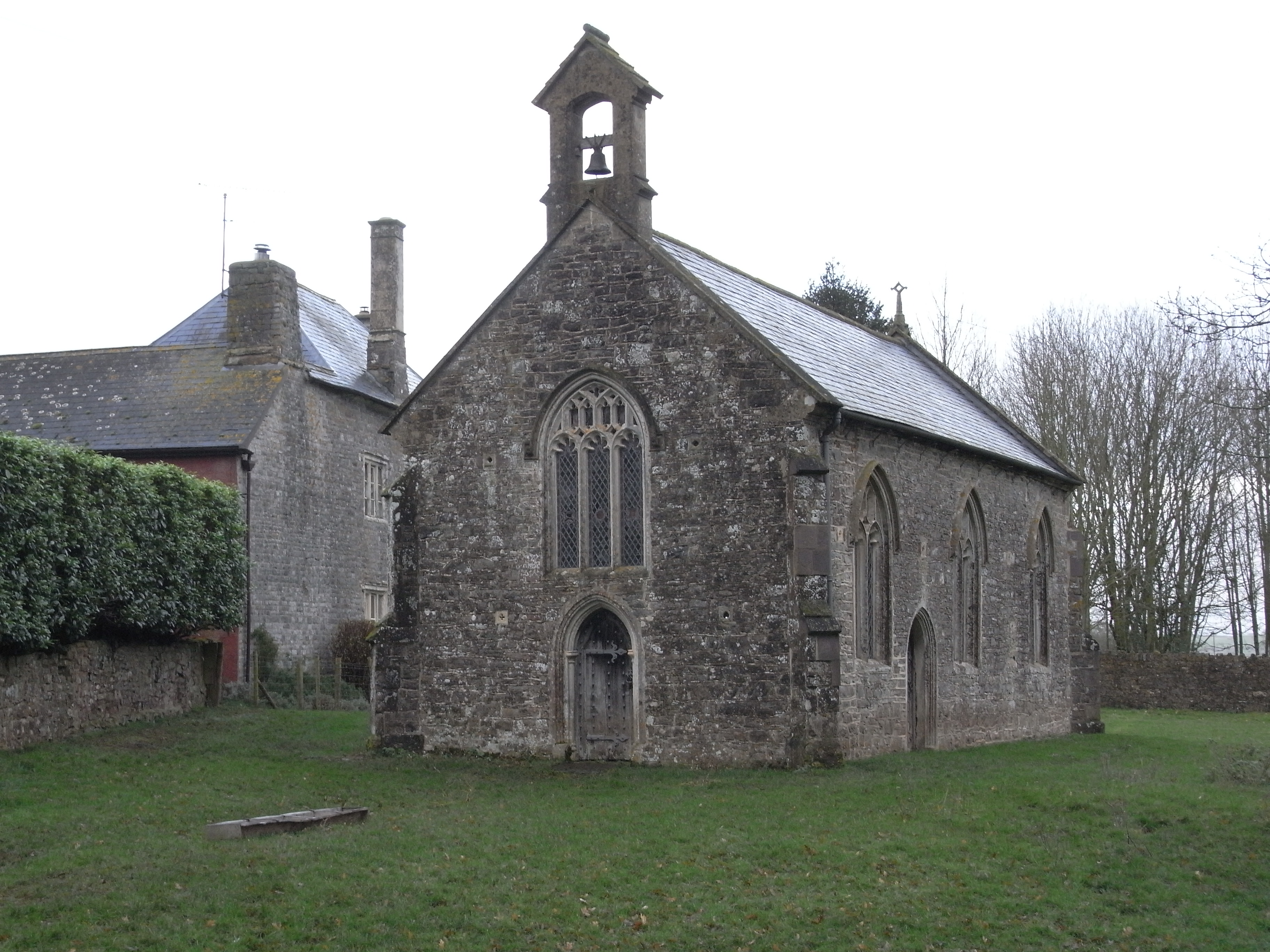
Ayshford Chapel, west end, with Ayshford Court behind

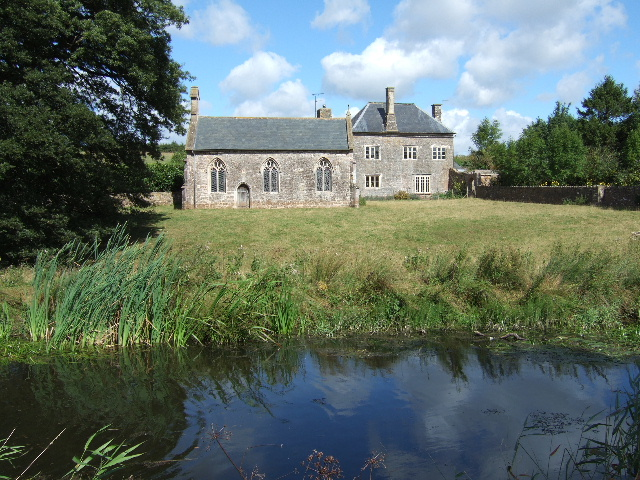
Ayshford Chapel viewed from across the canal, with Ayshford Court behind

Ayshford Chapel is a former private chapel in the village of Ayshford, in the parish of Burlescombe, Devon, England. It is recorded in the National Heritage List for England as a designated Grade I listed building, and is under the care of the Friends of Friendless Churches. It is situated immediately to the south of the manor house of Ayshford Court, and to the north of the Grand Western Canal.

== History ==
The chapel was built in the 15th century by the Ayshford family of adjacent Ayshford Court. It is considered to be large for a private chapel in Devon. It was renovated during the 19th century. This renovation included installation of stained glass; this was the first signed work by the glass painter John Toms of Wellington. Since it was declared redundant, the chapel has been maintained by a charity, the Friends of Friendless Churches, who hold a 125 year lease with effect from 1 February 2000. In 2001–02 the charity undertook major conservation work. This included restoring the salmon-pink limewash in the interior, and repairing the stained glass.

== Architecture ==
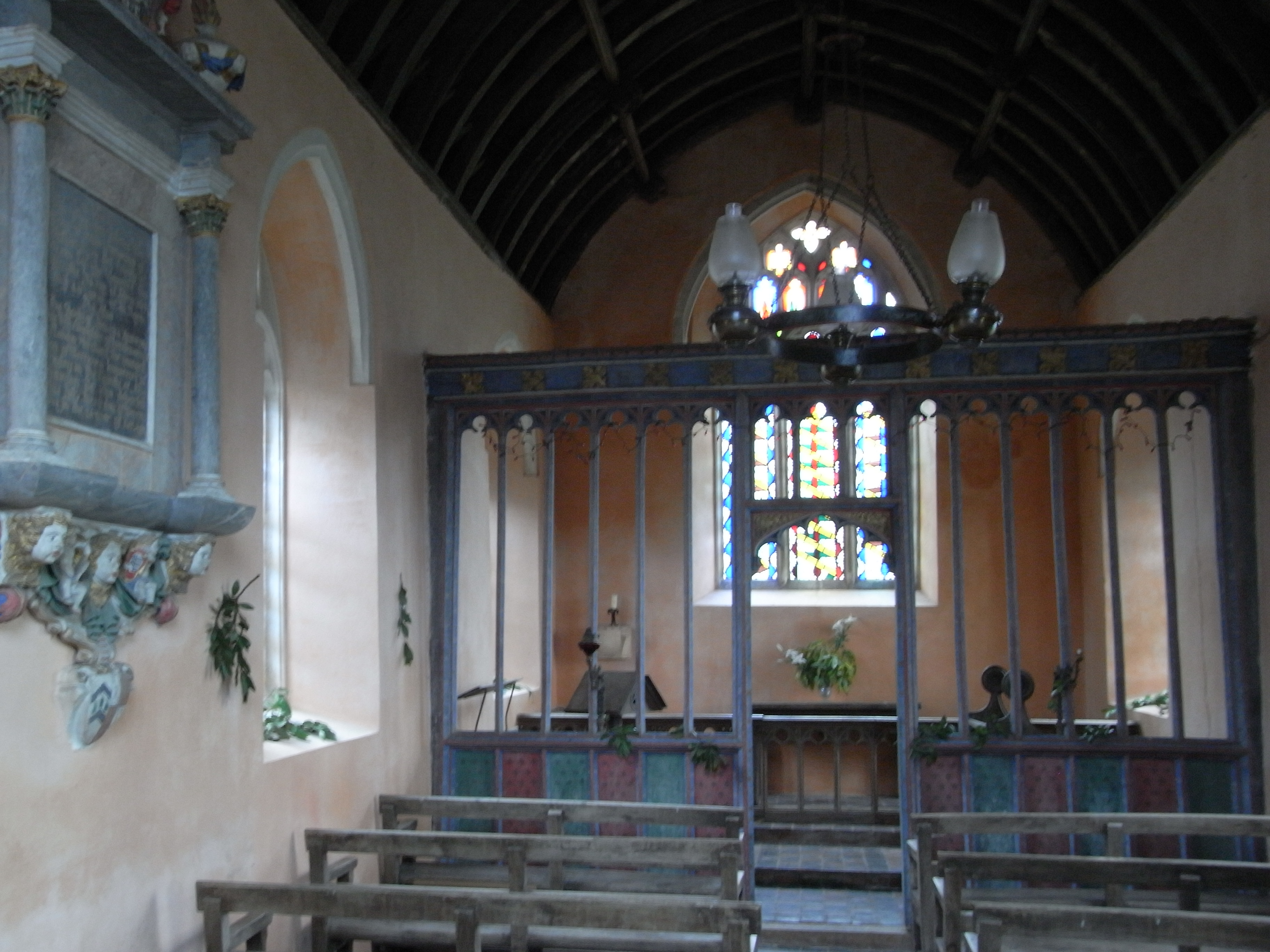
Ayshford Chapel, interior view looking eastward toward the chancel

Ayshford Chapel is constructed in local Westleigh chert rubble, with dressings in Beer stone. It has a slate roof. The plan consists of a rectangular building in one cell with no division between the nave and chancel. It is supported by corner buttresses. The ends are gabled and coped; at the west end is a bellcote, and at the east end is an apex cross. There are three two-light windows in each side wall and a three-light window in each end; all contain Perpendicular tracery. There are two doors, one at the west end, the other on the south side.

Internally the roof dates from the 15th century; it is a continuous open wagon roof and contains oak bosses with foliage carving. The carved oak chancel screen dating from the same period is panelled and includes blind arcarding. It was re-painted in the 19th century. Some of red, blue and green paint is still present. The remainder of the furniture, consisting of utilitarian oak pews, dates from the 19th century. The chapel is floored with red and black glazed tiles, and contains memorials to members of the Ayshford family. The stained glass is said to be in Art Deco style. There is a single bell inscribed with the date 1657.

== Monuments ==
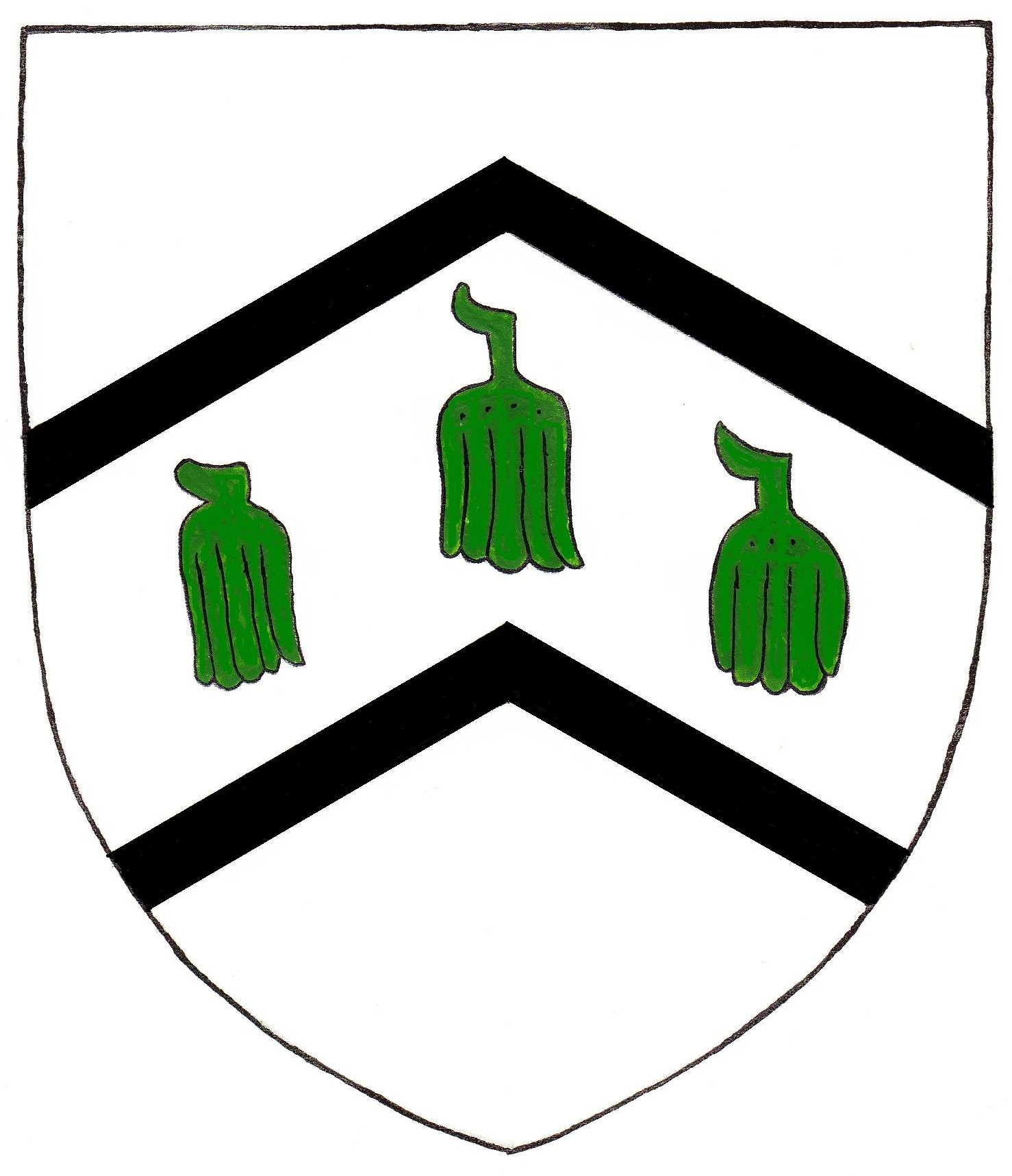
Armorials of Ayshford family of Ayshford Manor, Burlescombe Parish, Devon. Argent, 3 Ash-crops, Vert, between 2 chevronels, S[able].

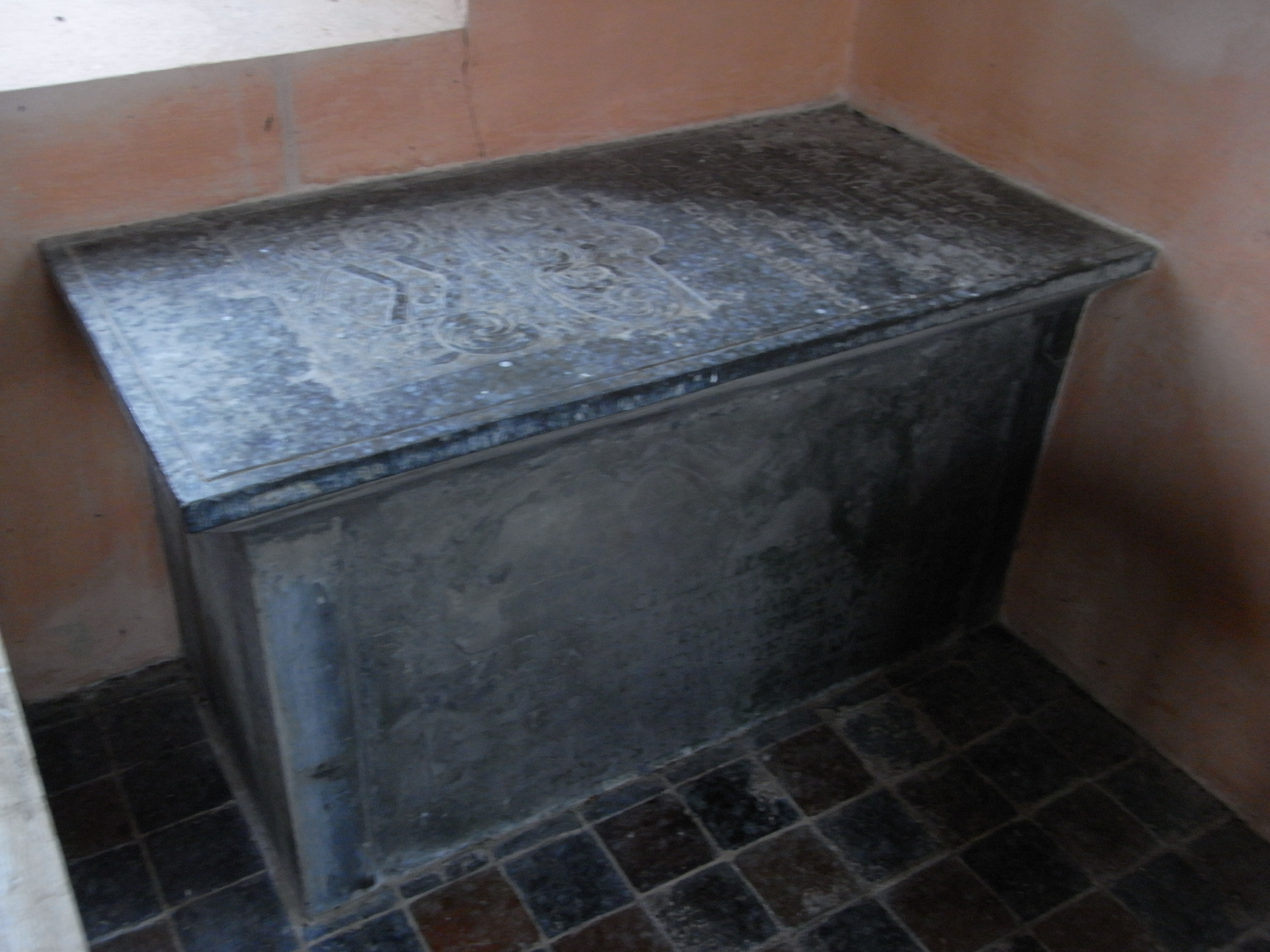
Chest-tomb of the infant Henry Ayshford, died 1666 aged 1 year and 9 months, the heir apparent to the Ayshford estates. Chancel, to north of altar

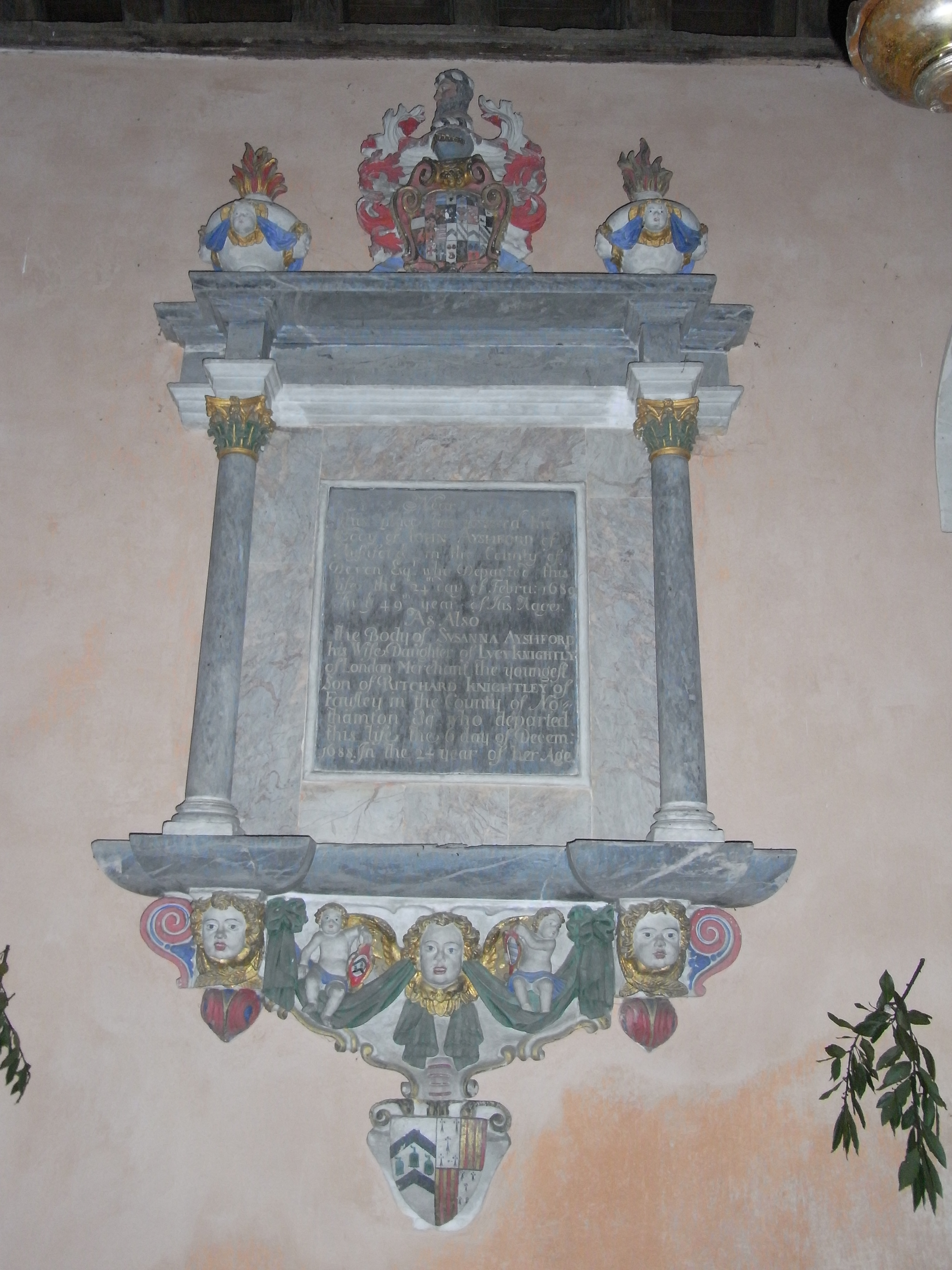
Monument to John Ayshford (died 1689), last of the Ayshfords of Ayshford, Ayshford Chapel, Ayshford

On the floor in the sanctuary before the altar is the much worn yellow sandstone gravestone of Henry Ashford. The text reads as follows:

Hic jacet Henricus Ayshforde armiger qui obiit x die Februarii Anno Domini 1649 anno aetatis suo 73. Etiam jacet Anne uxor eius quae obiit ultimo die Octobris Anno Dom. 1656 anno aetatis sua ...
(Here lies Henry Ayshford Esq., who died the tenth day of February in the year of our Lord 1649 in the 73rd year of his age. Also lies Anne his wife who died on the last day of October in the year of our Lord 1656 in the ... year of her age.)

Below is an escutcheon showing the arms of Ayshford impaling his wife's arms, now indistinct but still showing a chevron. His wife was "Amy" Bluett of nearby Holcombe Court, Holcombe Rogus, the arms of which family are: A chevron between 3 eagles.

In the sanctuary to the left of the altar is the small black marble chest-tomb of the infant Henry Ashford (died 1666), great-grandson of Henry Ayshford (died 1649). The infant Henry was the only son of Arthur Ayshford (1640–1670) (eldest son of John Ayshford, third son of Henry (died 1649)), by his wife Grace Courtenay, daughter of John Courtenay (died 1660) of Molland. Grace's brother James Courtenay of Meshaw had married as his first wife Susanna Sanford, sister of John Sanford (died 1711) the eventual heir of Ayshford, whose tombstone can be seen in Molland Church. The infant Henry was the heir apparent to the Ayshford estates and his loss was clearly a great blow for his father, whose heir thereupon became his brother John Ayshford (died 1689), last of the Ayshfords whose mural monument is on the north wall of the Ayshford Chapel. The inscription on the top slab of Henry's tomb reads:

(Here lies)? the body of ...ry Ayshforde sone of Arthur Ayshforde Esq.r who departed this life the 17th day of January Anno Dom. 1666 aged one yeare and nine mo.

Below is an escutcheon with mantling showing the arms of Ayshford with a helm atop bearing the Ayshford crest of a saracen's head. An inscribed double arcade is shown on the front side.

On the north wall of the nave is a baroque marble mural monument to John Ashford (1641–1689), second son of John Ayshford (1604–1654) by Cicely Hacche, son of Henry Ayshford (died 1649). John Ayshford (died 1689) was the last Ashford lord of the manor of Ayshford, and his heir was his first-cousin John Sanford (1638–1711) (who married Elizabeth Knightley, his sister-in-law), the son of his aunt Mary Ayshford (1606–1662) and her husband Henry Sanford (1612–1644) of Nynehead Court, Somerset. The monument comprises a rectangular plaque flanked by Corinthian columns below a moulded entablature above which are shown the Ashford arms flanked by flaming urns. The columns sit on a shelf supported on consoles carved as cherubs heads. The apron is carved with swags, cherubs and the Ashford arms. The incised text reads as follows:

Near this place lies enterrd the body of John Ayshford of Ayshford in the county of Devon Esq.r who departed this life the 24th day of Febru: 1689 in ye 49th year of his aage (sic). As also the body of Susanna Ayshford his wife daughter of Lucy Knightley of London, merchant, the youngest son of Ritchard Knightley of Fausley in the county of Northamton Esq.r who departed this life the 6 day of Decem: 1688 in the 24 year of her age.

The Knightley family held the manor of Fawsley, 3 miles south of Daventry, Northamptonshire, from 1416 to 1914, and the grand Elizabethan manor house of Fawsley Hall survives, in the chapel of which survive effigies of the Knightley family. Two earlier and more elaborate mural monuments to the Ayshford family exist in nearby Burlescombe Church, the parish church of Ayshford Manor.

== Ayshford Court ==
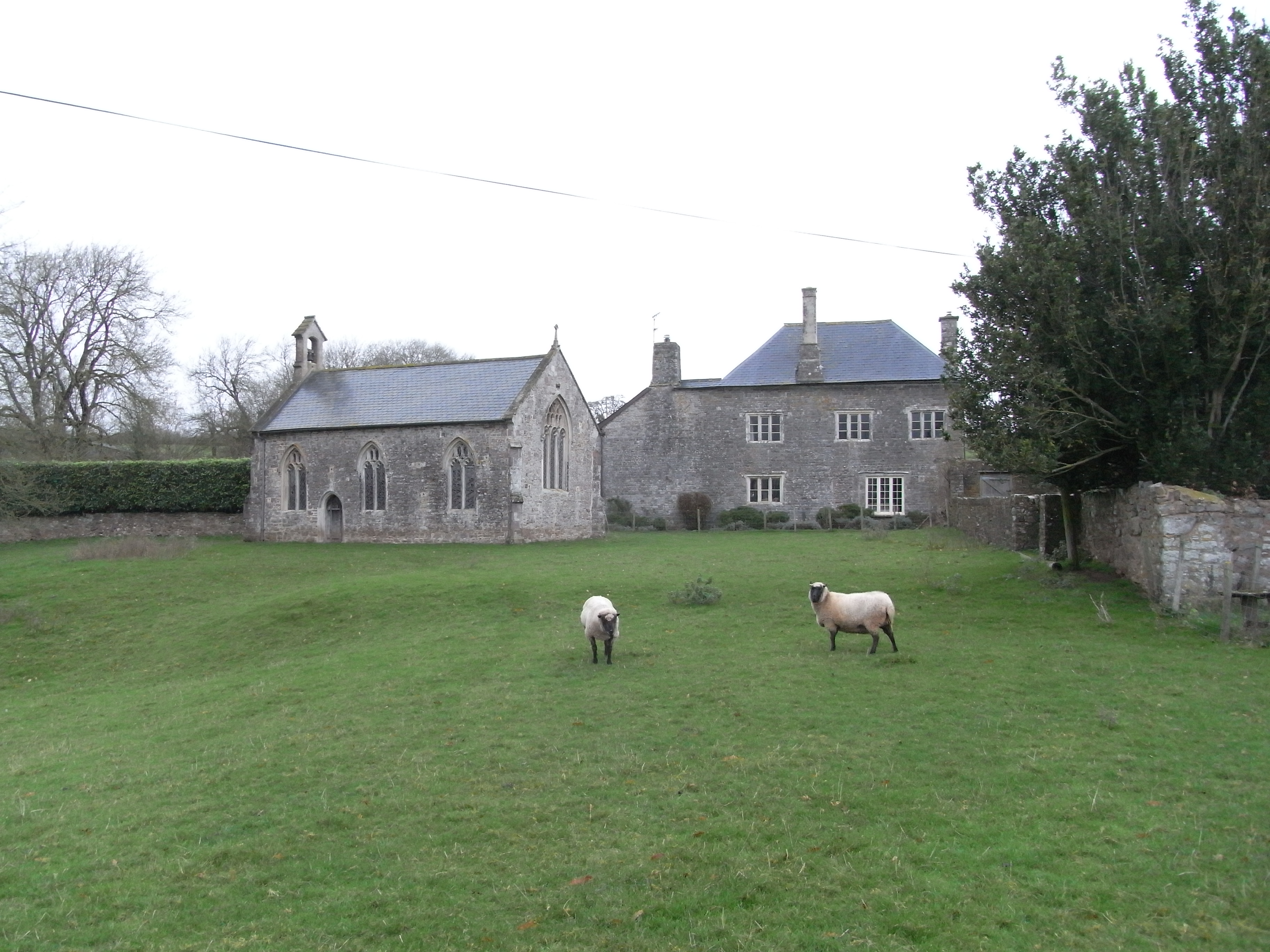
Ayshford Chapel and Ayshford Court, viewed from the south, from the bank of the canal

Ayshford is recorded in the Domesday Book of 1086 as Aiseforda. It is recorded even earlier in a charter dated 958. The manor house is now split into two residences. The main historic house was built by the Ashford/Ayshford family in about 1500 with major added in the 16th and 17th. centuries. The parlour wing was probably built by Roger Ayshford (died 1611), whose kneeling white marble effigy can be seen in his mural monument in Burlescombe Church, and the plasterwork was probably commissioned by Arthur Ayshford (1600 – 1642/7), his eldest son, who died without male progeny, his heir being his brother John (died 1654).

The owners of the building when it was listed in 1966 possessed a transcript of a 1689 inventory which showed the great wealth of the Ayshford family at that time. Mention was made of a "painted chamber". Ayshford Court, with its chapel and farmbuildings form an attractive group of buildings. The Ayshford estates passed to the Sanford family of Nynehead Court, Somerset, by the marriage of the heiress Mary Ayshford (1607–1662), daughter of Henry Ayshford, to Henry Sanford (1612–1644). A mural monument to the couple survives in Nynehead Church.
