= Nynehead Court =

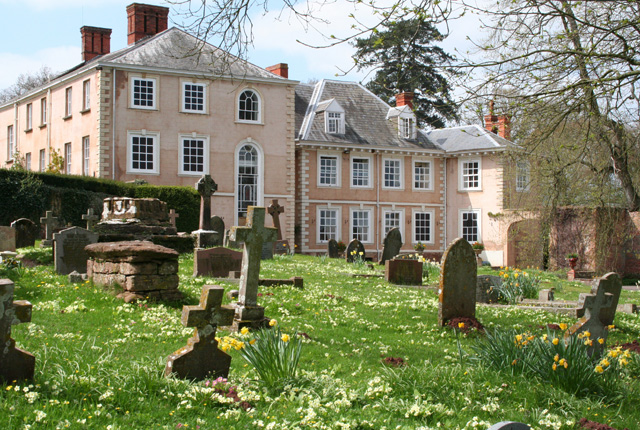

- Location within Somerset
- 50°59′52″N 3°13′50″W
- Location: Nynehead, Somerset, England

History
- Built: 14th century

Listed Building – Grade II*
- Official name: Nynehead Court
- Designated: 25 January 1956
- Reference no.: 1307540

Nynehead Court is a Grade II* listed building at Nynehead in Somerset, England.

== History ==
The building dates back to the late 14th century with major additions in 1675 and the 18th century.

It was occupied by the Fluri family (1068 - 1318), the de Wyke family (1318-1599) and the Sanford family (1599 - ca. 1902). Edward Ayshford Sanford was MP for Somerset and High Sheriff of Somerset in 1848. The Sandfords sold the house around 1940 and it is now a care home.

The building has been designated by English Heritage as a Grade II* listed building. The gardens are listed, Grade II*, on the Register of Historic Parks and Gardens of special historic interest in England.

The 13 acres (5 ha) landscape park was laid out in the 18th century, although major landscaping works were carried out in the early 19th century. The icehouse within the grounds dates from 1803 and has been restored with support from Taunton Deane Council.
