= Ayshford =

Hamlet in Devon, England

Coordinates: 50.92°N 03.36°W

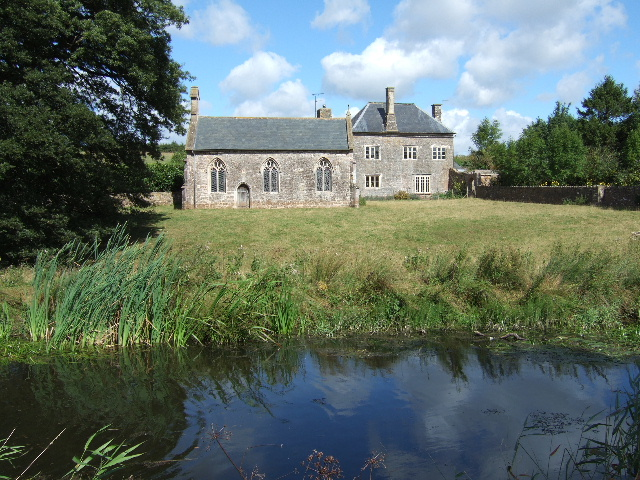
- The Chapel at Ayshford

- Location within Devon
- OS grid reference: ST0415
- Shire county: Devon
- Region: South West
- Country: England
- Sovereign state: United Kingdom
- Police: Devon and Cornwall
- Fire: Devon and Somerset
- Ambulance: South Western

Ayshford is a hamlet and historic manor in the parish of Burlescombe in the district of Mid-Devon, Devon, England. It was anciently the seat of the de Ayshford family.

Ayshford Chapel is a grade I listed 15th century chapel of the Ayshford family.

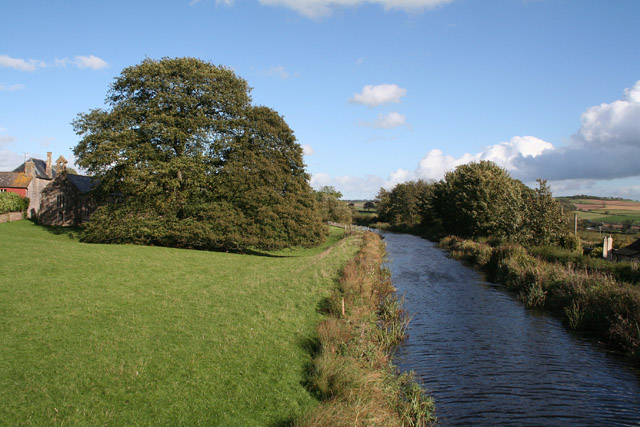
Burlescombe: the Grand Western Canal at Ayshford.

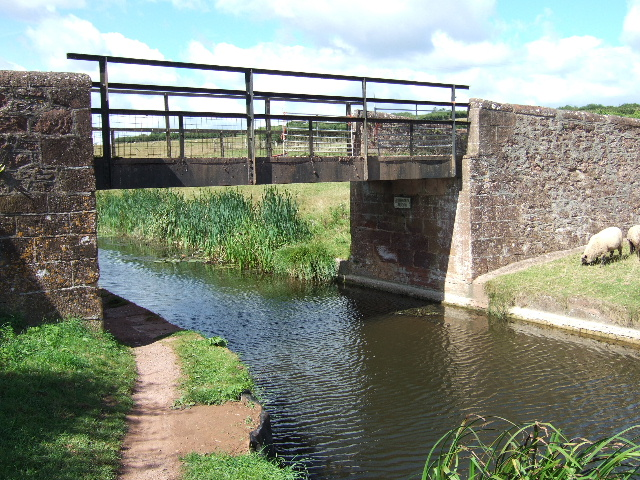
Ayshford Bridge.
