= Nynehead =

Village in Somerset, England

Coordinates: 50.9953°N 3.2339°W

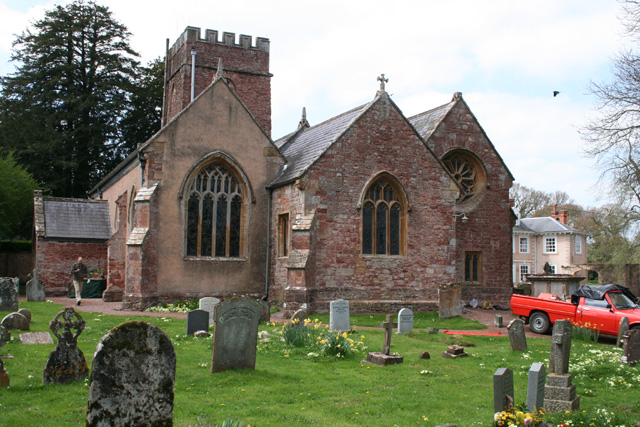
- All Saints' Church

- Location within Somerset
- Population: 415 (2011)
- OS grid reference: ST135225
- Unitary authority: Somerset Council
- Ceremonial county: Somerset
- Region: South West
- Country: England
- Sovereign state: United Kingdom
- Post town: WELLINGTON
- Postcode district: TA21
- Dialling code: 01823
- Police: Avon and Somerset
- Fire: Devon and Somerset
- Ambulance: South Western
- UK Parliament: Tiverton and Minehead

Nynehead is a village and civil parish in Somerset, England, situated on the River Tone, 7 miles (11 km) south-west of Taunton and 1.5 miles (2 km) north-west of Wellington. The village has a population of 415.

== History ==
The first documentary evidence comes from 737 when the manor was granted to the Bishop of Winchester. In 890 the land was granted to a Wulfhere Gidding. The parish of Nynehead was part of the Taunton Deane Hundred.

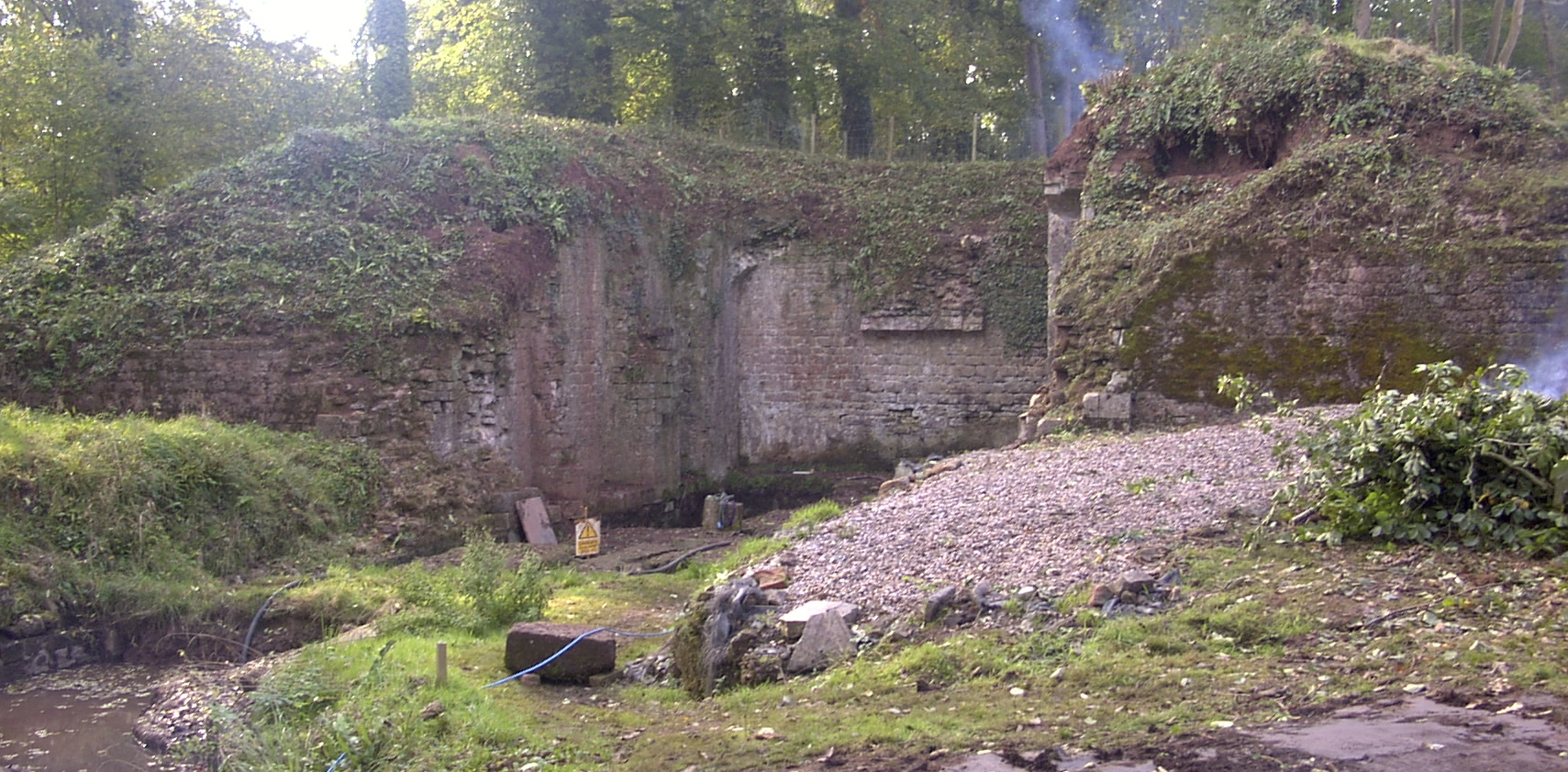
The remains of Nynehead boat lift

The village was the site of a boat lift on the Grand Western Canal, and the remains of two aqueducts are still standing.

== Governance ==
The parish council has responsibility for local issues, including setting an annual precept (local rate) to cover the council’s operating costs and producing annual accounts for public scrutiny. The parish council evaluates local planning applications and works with the local police, district council officers, and neighbourhood watch groups on matters of crime, security, and traffic. The parish council's role also includes initiating projects for the maintenance and repair of parish facilities, as well as consulting with the district council on the maintenance, repair, and improvement of highways, drainage, footpaths, public transport, and street cleaning. Conservation matters (including trees and listed buildings) and environmental issues are also the responsibility of the council.

For local government purposes, since 1 April 2023, the village comes under the unitary authority of Somerset Council. Prior to this, it was part of the non-metropolitan district of Somerset West and Taunton (formed on 1 April 2019) and, before this, the district of Taunton Deane (established under the Local Government Act 1972). From 1894-1974, for local government purposes, Nynehead was part of Wellington Rural District.

It is also part of the Tiverton and Minehead county constituency represented in the House of Commons of the Parliament of the United Kingdom. It elects one Member of Parliament (MP) by the first past the post system of election.

== Landmarks ==
Nynehead Court dates from the late 14th century with major additions in 1675 and the 18th century. The Nynehead Hollow is another prominent landmark in the village. It is believed that the "Hollow" was dug out by the Sandford family in the hope of making Nynehead Court quicker to get to from the servant houses which were situated in east Nynehead.

== Religious sites ==
The church, dedicated to All Saints, is a small structure built of mostly of local red Permo-Triassic rock, probably on the site of an earlier church, with a square tower containing five bells. The interior of the church contains some monuments to the Sandford family of Nynehead Court.

== Sandford family ==
The best known member of the Sandford family is probably the Reverend John Sandford, who was vicar of Nynehead from 1811 to 1834. From 1819 onwards he was largely an absentee clergyman living in Italy, where he made a controversial marriage to Elizabeth Georgiana Morgan, who had been divorced in scandalous circumstances by her first husband, Valentine Lawless, 2nd Baron Cloncurry, after admitting to adultery with a neighbour. They had one daughter, Anna, Lady Methuen.
