= Bremridge =

Historic estate in Devon, England

Coordinates: 51.0463°N 3.8652°W

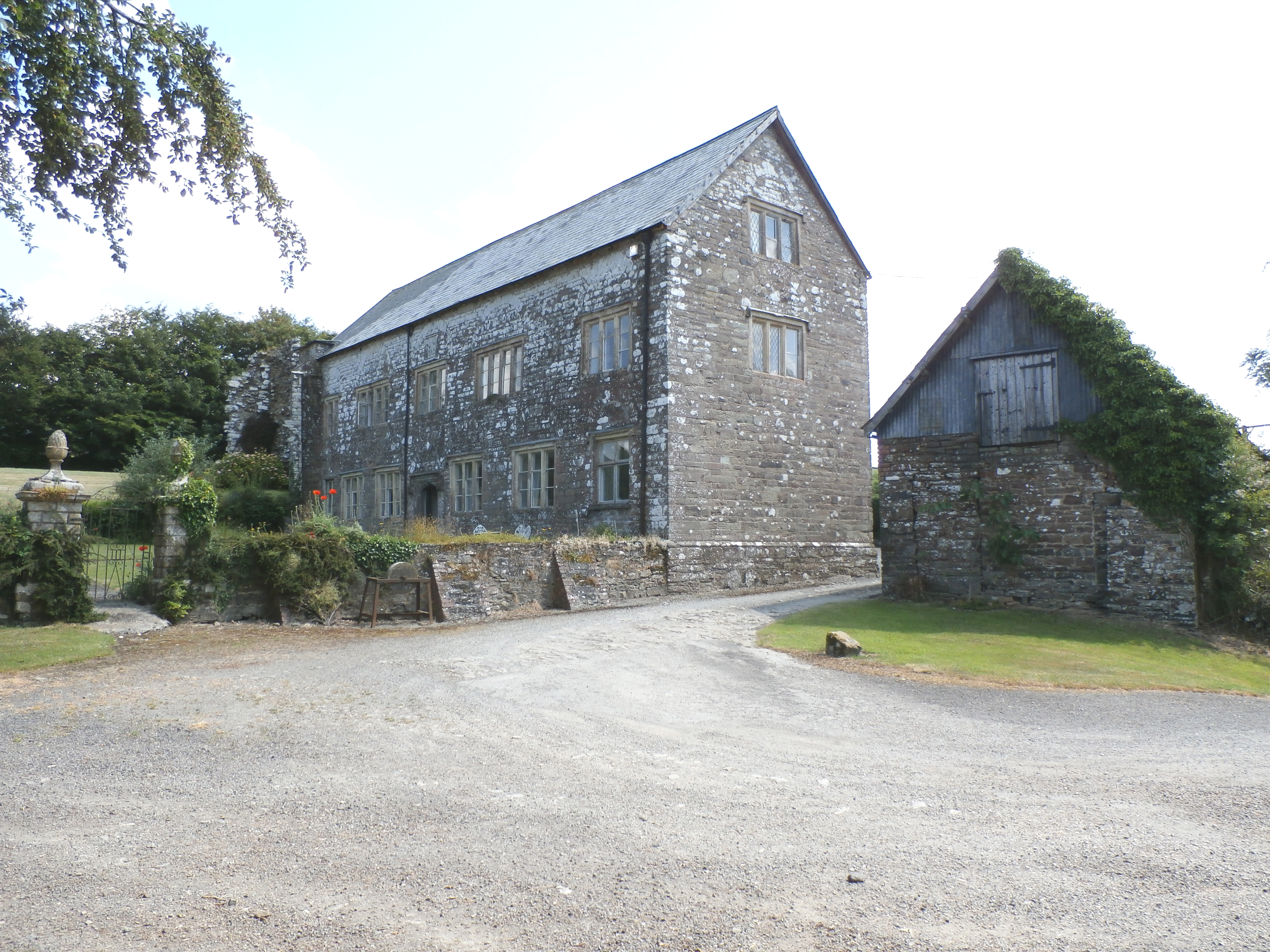
Bremridge mansion house, the surviving wing of the house rebuilt in 1654

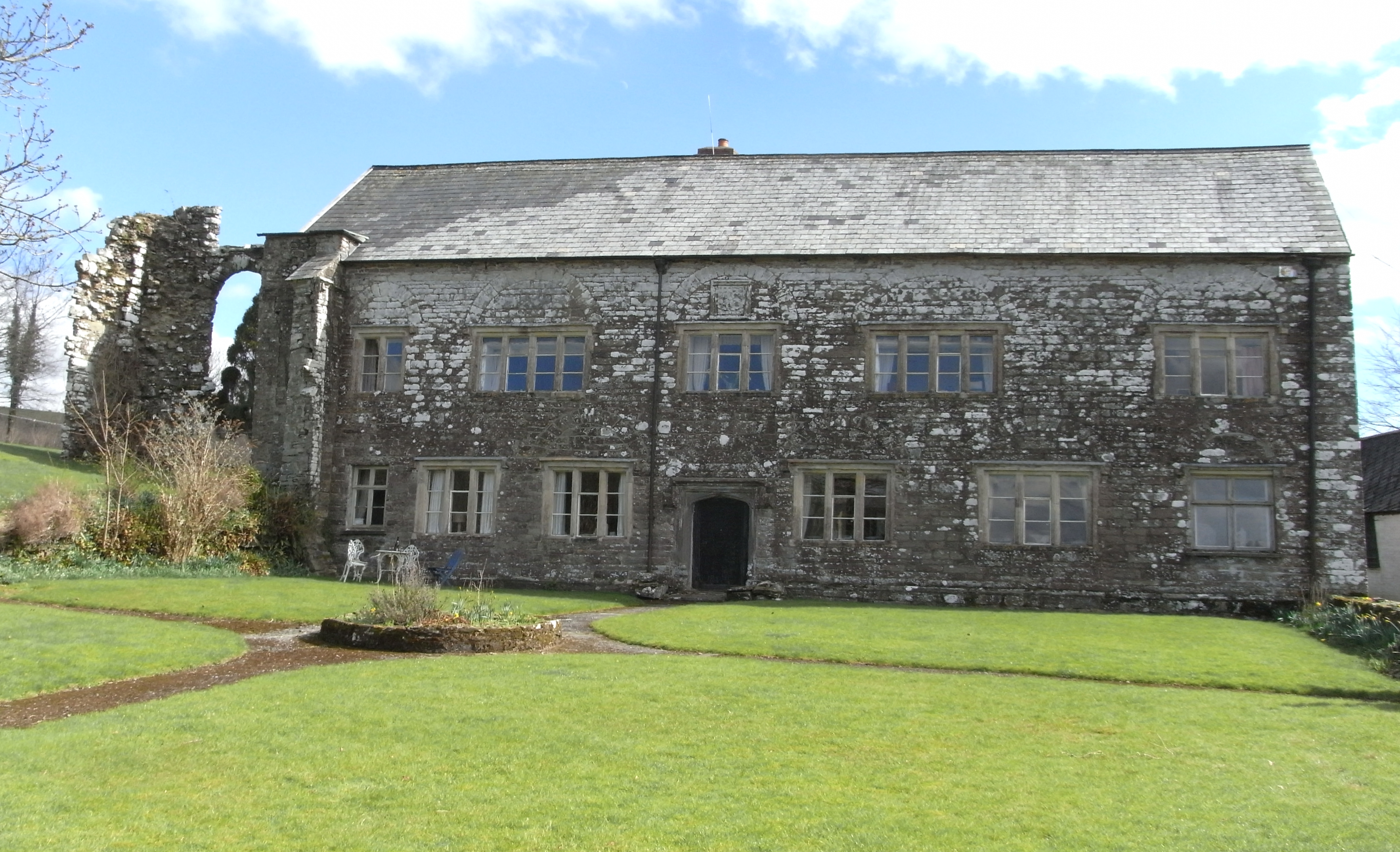
Bremridge, entrance front

Bremridge is a historic estate within the former hundred of South Molton in Devon, England. It is now within the parish of Filleigh but was formerly in that of South Molton. It is situated 8 miles north-west of South Molton. Since the construction of the nearby A361 North Devon Link Road direct access has been cut off from Bremridge to Filleigh and South Molton. The surviving wing of the mansion house built in 1654 is a Grade II* listed building. Bremridge Wood is the site of an Iron Age enclosure or hill fort, the earthwork of which is situated on a hillside forming a promontory above the River Bray. In Bremridge Wood survives a disused tunnel of the former Great Western Railway line between South Molton and Barnstaple, much of the course of which has been used for the A361. The tunnel is 319 yards long and was identified as "Bremridge Tunnel" in the 1889 Ordnance Survey map but as "Castle Hill Tunnel" in subsequent editions.

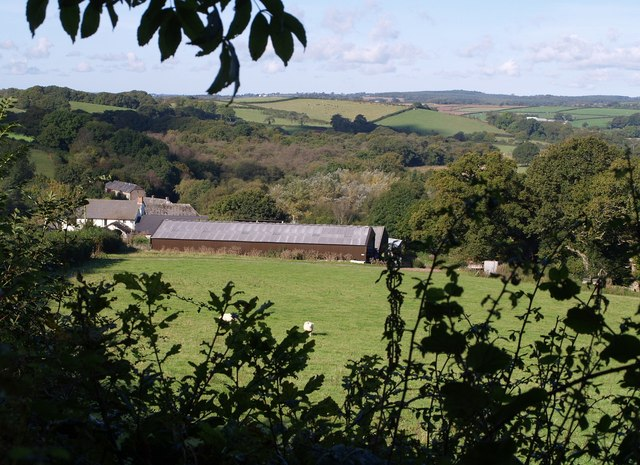
The farm at Bremridge seen from beside the lane from Hatherleigh, and across the field shown in 576675.

== Descent of the manor ==
=== Anglo-Saxon ===
The Anglo-Saxon holder of the estate of Bremridge immediately before 1066, as recorded by the Domesday Book, was a certain Edmer, who also held, amongst others, the nearby estate of Alre, i.e. South Aller, one mile south of Bremridge, also later referred to as Aure and Sudaure. Concerning the etymology of Bremridge, Risdon (d.1640) (who called it Bromridge) stated: "lands subject to brambles and briers so the name importeth".

=== Norman ===
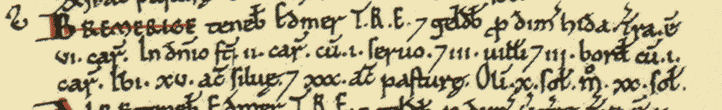
Domesday Book entry for BREMERIGE

In the Domesday Book of 1086 BREMERIGE is listed as the 56th of the 99 Devonshire landholdings of Geoffrey de Montbray (d.1093), Bishop of Coutances, and was one of the 73 holdings he sub-infeudated to Drogo son of Mauger, his chief sub-tenant in Devon. Mauger his father was probably Mauger of Carteret who is listed in the Domesday Book as a tenant of Robert, Count of Mortain (d.1090) at his Devonshire manor of Donningstone in the parish of Clayhanger, Devon, and was also a tenant of several of the Count's manors in Somerset. The ancient manor of Carteret is on the west coast of Normandy, Manche, immediately to the east of the Channel Islands. The (expanded) text of the Domesday Book entry is as follows:

BREMERIGE. Tenebat Edmer tempore Regis Edwardi. geldabat pro dimidia hida. Terra est vi carucis. In dominio sunt ii carrucae cum i servo iii villani iii bordarii cum i carruca. Ibi xv acrae silvae xxx acrae pasturae. Olim x solidos modo xx solidos. (Bremridge. Edmer held it in the time of King Edward the Confessor. It paid tax for half a hide. There is land for six ploughs. In demesne there are 2 ploughs with one servant. 3 villagers and 3 smallholders with one plough. there (are) 15 acres of woodland, 30 acres of pasture. (Value) formerly 10 shillings, now 20 shillings.)

The Exon Domesday contains:

Episcopus habet .i. mansionem que uocatur Bremerige quam tenuit Edmerus ea die qua rex Eduuardus fuit uiuus et mortuus et reddidit gildum pro dimidia hida. Hanc possunt arare .vi. carruce. Hanc tenet Drogo de episcopo. Inde habet Drogo .i. uirgam et .ii. carrucas in dominio. et villani .i. uirgam. et .i. carrucam. Ibi habet Drogo .iii. uillanos. et .iii. bordarios. et .i. seruum. et .v. animalia et .x. porcos. et .lx. oues. et .xxii. capras. et .xv. agros nemoris et .xxx. agros pascuae. Haec ualet .xx. solidos. et quando episcopus recepit ualebat .x. solidos.

translated as:

The bishop of Coutances has 1 estate which is called Bremeridge, which Eadmær held on the day that King Eadweard was alive and dead, and it paid geld for half a hide. 6 ploughs can plough this. Drew holds this from the bishop. Of it Drew has 1 virgate and 2 ploughs in demesne and the villans 1 virgate and 1 plough. There Drew has 3 villans and 3 bordars and 1 slave and 5 beasts and 10 pigs and 60 sheep and 22 goats and 15 acres of woodland and 30 acres of grazing-land. This is worth 20 shillings and, when the bishop received it, it was worth 10 shillings.

== Feudal barony of Barnstaple ==
Bremridge was a constituent manor of the large feudal barony of Barnstaple, whose first Norman lord was Geoffrey de Montbray (d.1093), Bishop of Coutances. Thus the descent of Bremridge followed the descent of the barony. At some time before his death in 1100 King William II re-granted the barony of Barnstaple to Juhel de Totnes (died 1123/30), formerly feudal baron of Totnes. Juhel's son and heir was Alfred de Totnes, who died sine prole some time before 1139, leaving two sisters as his co-heiresses each to a moiety of the barony: Aenor and a sister whose name is unknown, wife of Henry de Tracy (died pre-1165).

=== de Tracy ===
The Totnes sister of unknown name married Henry de Tracy (died pre-1165), to whom approximately half of the constituent manors of the barony, including Bremridge, were allocated as his wife's inheritance. Henry left a son and heir Oliver I de Tracy (died c. 1184), who in 1165 was charged scutage on 25 knight's fees for his moiety. In the Cartae Baronum of 1166 he declared 23 1/3 and in 1168 30 1/2 knights' fees. Oliver I left a son and heir Oliver II (died 1210), who left as his heir Henry de Tracy (died 1274), who also inherited in 1213 the other moiety of the barony. The Book of Fees (compiled circa 1198-1292) lists Bremelrig and Sudaure (Bremridge and South Aller) as held by "Oliver de Tracy".

==== de Tracy confirmation ====
An undated confirmation deed relating to Bremelrigge sealed by Henry de Tracy survives as the oldest of the mediaeval deeds amongst the Cruwys Papers at Cruwys Morchard House. It was dated by Dr. Oliver as tempore King Richard I (1089-1099), but by more modern authorities as circa 1220. The text (translated) is as follows:

Know ye present and future that I, Henry de Tracy, have given and granted and by this present charter have confirmed to Oliver de Tracy, for his homage and service, all the land of Bremelrigge and the service of Aure which belongs to the said land, with all its appurtenances, to have and to hold to himself and his heirs or to whomsoever he shall have wished to give or assign it, from me and my heirs, for ever freely, quietly, peacefully, wholly, doing for it royal service as much as pertains to the fee of one knight for all service and demand, to me and my heirs, he and his heirs or assigns. And I, the aforesaid Henry, and my heirs, are bound to warrant the title of the said land of Bremelrigge with the service of Aure and with all its appurtenances to the said Oliver and his heirs or their assigns against all men for ever. And that this my grant, gift and confirmation by charter may remain stable and unbroken for ever I have strengthened the present charter with the impression of my seal. Witnesses: Hugh Peverel; Willm de Widewich; Richard de Cruwes; Philip de Bello Monte; Nicholas de Filelaya; Hugh de Chaggkeford; Willm Coffin; Alexander de Cruwes; Henry de Bello Monte; Ralph de Widewich; Thomas le Brutun; Gregory de Stoke, clerk; and many others.

Amongst the witnesses were members of the Cruwys family, which still survives today in residence at its ancient seat of Cruwys Morchard, anciently held as tenants of the de Tracey family; members of the Beaumont family (Latinised to Bello Monte) of Youlston in the parish of Shirwell, great landowners, a member of the de Filleigh family lord of the manor of Filleigh, in which parish is now situated Bremridge; and Hugh de Chagford, of Chagford, Dartmoor. Also William Coffin of Portledge, lord of the manor of Alwington, which family survived there in the male line until 1766.

=== FitzMartin ===
The eventual heiress of the barony was Maud de Brian, granddaughter of Henry de Tracy (died 1274), who married Nicholas FitzMartin (d.1260), feudal baron of Blagdon in Somerset. Maud's son was William I FitzMartin (died 1324) whose son and heir William II FitzMartin died sine prole in 1326. The 1326 Inquisition post mortem of William II FitzMartin (died 1326) lists his fees pertaining to the Barony of Barnstaple, comprising 88 estates, including Bremelrugg and South Alre (Bremridge & South Aller), forming one knight's fee and tenanted by John Tracy.

== Cobleigh ==
Margaret Cobleigh (died 1547) of Brightley, Chittlehampton, died seized of the manors of Brightley, Stowford, Snape, Wollacombe Tracy, Bremridge and Nymet St. George. Margaret was the only child and sole heiress of John Coblegh (d.1542) of Brightley by his wife Joan Fortescue, whose small monumental brasses survives in Chittlehampton Church. Joan (or Jane) Fortescue was a daughter of William Fortescue (d.1520), 2nd son of John Fortescue, of Whympston, Modbury, which John Fortescue was 1st cousin of Sir John Fortescue (c. 1394–c. 1480), Lord Chief Justice of England and Wales and ancestor of Earl Fortescue of Filleigh. Margaret Cobleigh married Sir Roger Giffard (d.1547) and thus Brightley, together with other estates including Tapeley in the parish of Westleigh, passed to the Giffard family.

== Dodderidge ==
=== John Dodderidge (1555–1628) ===
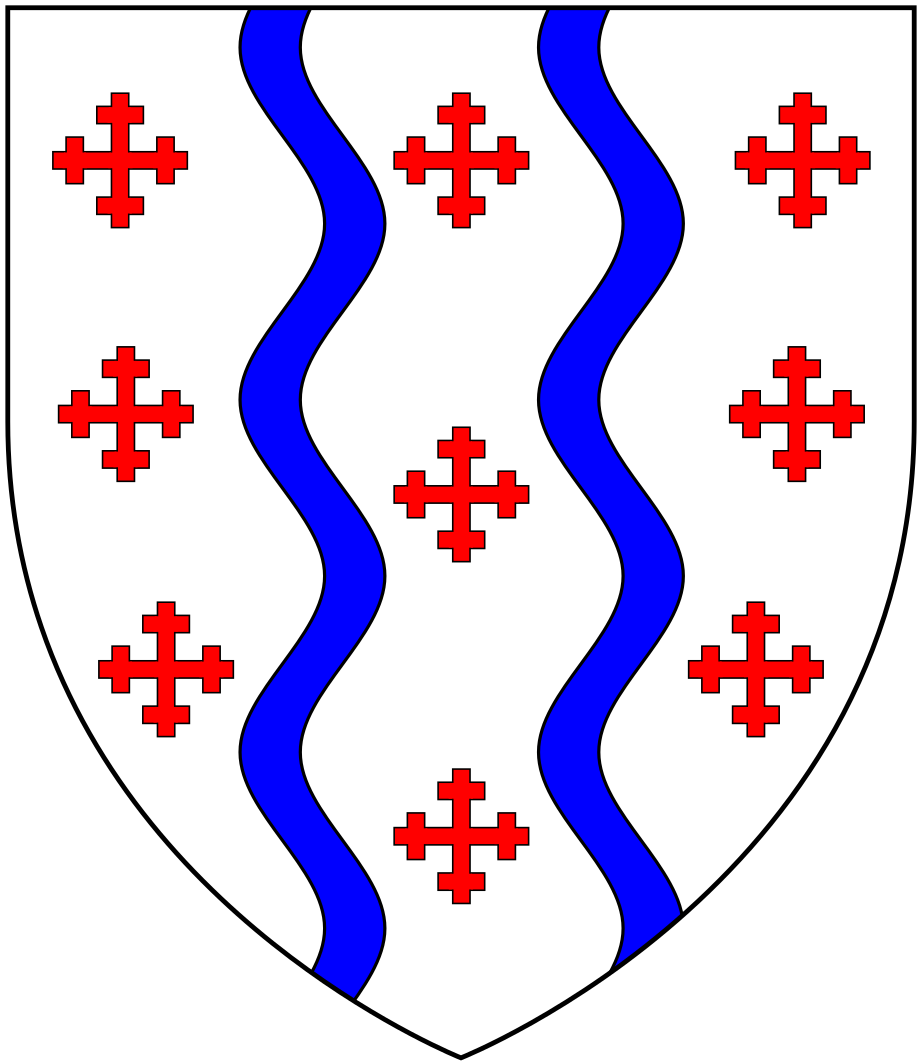
Arms of Dodderidge: Argent, two pales wavy azure between nine cross croslets gules. These arms are visible on the monument to Sir John Dodderidge (1555-1628) in the Lady Chapel of Exeter Cathedral, also high above the entrance door of Bremridge, sculpted in stone impaling Pollard

At some time the estate of Bremridge became the inheritance of Sir John Doddridge (Doderidge or Dodderidge, etc.) (1555–1628), Justice of the King's Bench in 1612 and Member of Parliament for Barnstaple in 1589 and for Horsham in 1604. The Dodderidge family had long been prominent merchants in nearby South Molton and later in Barnstaple.

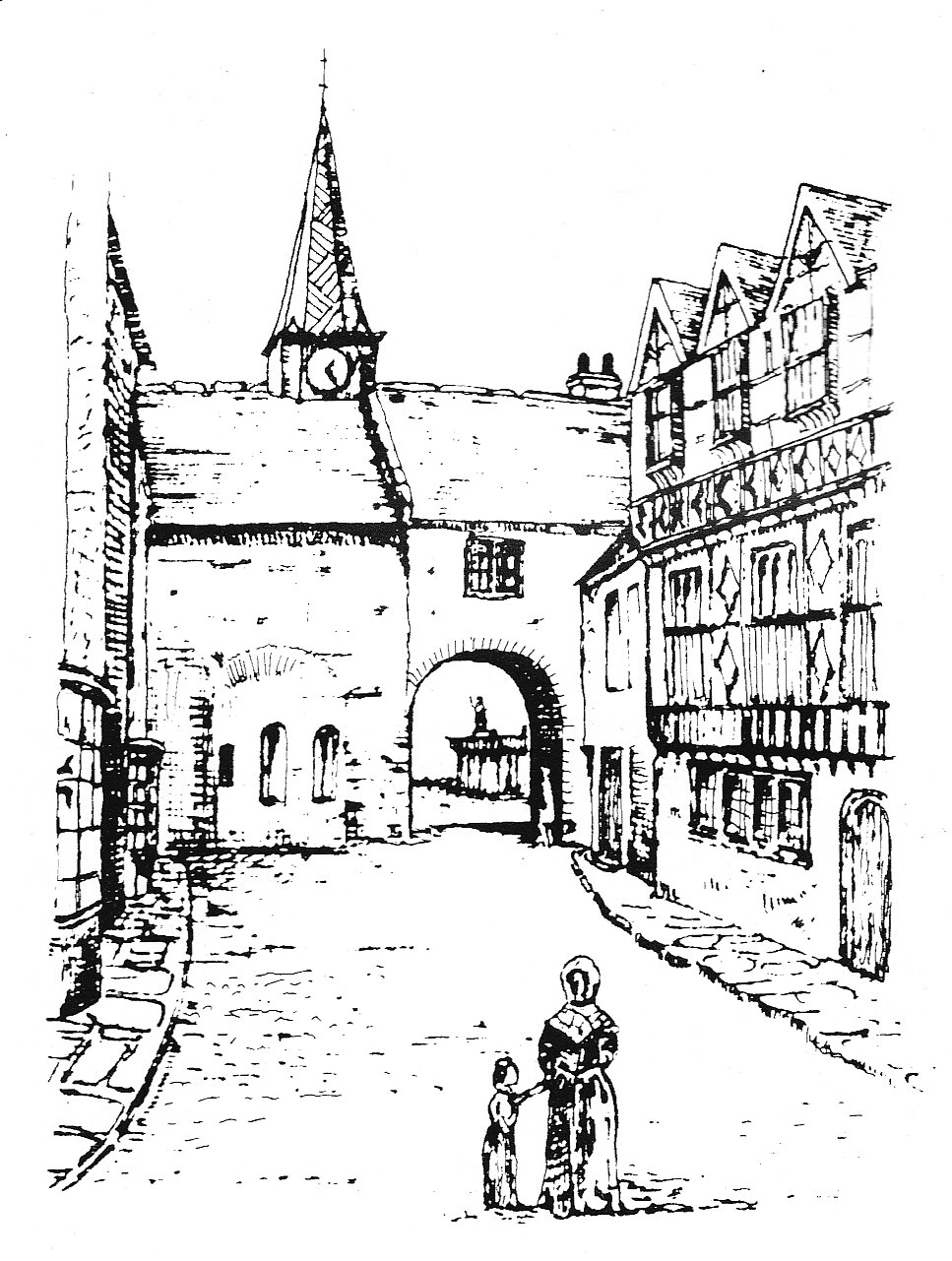
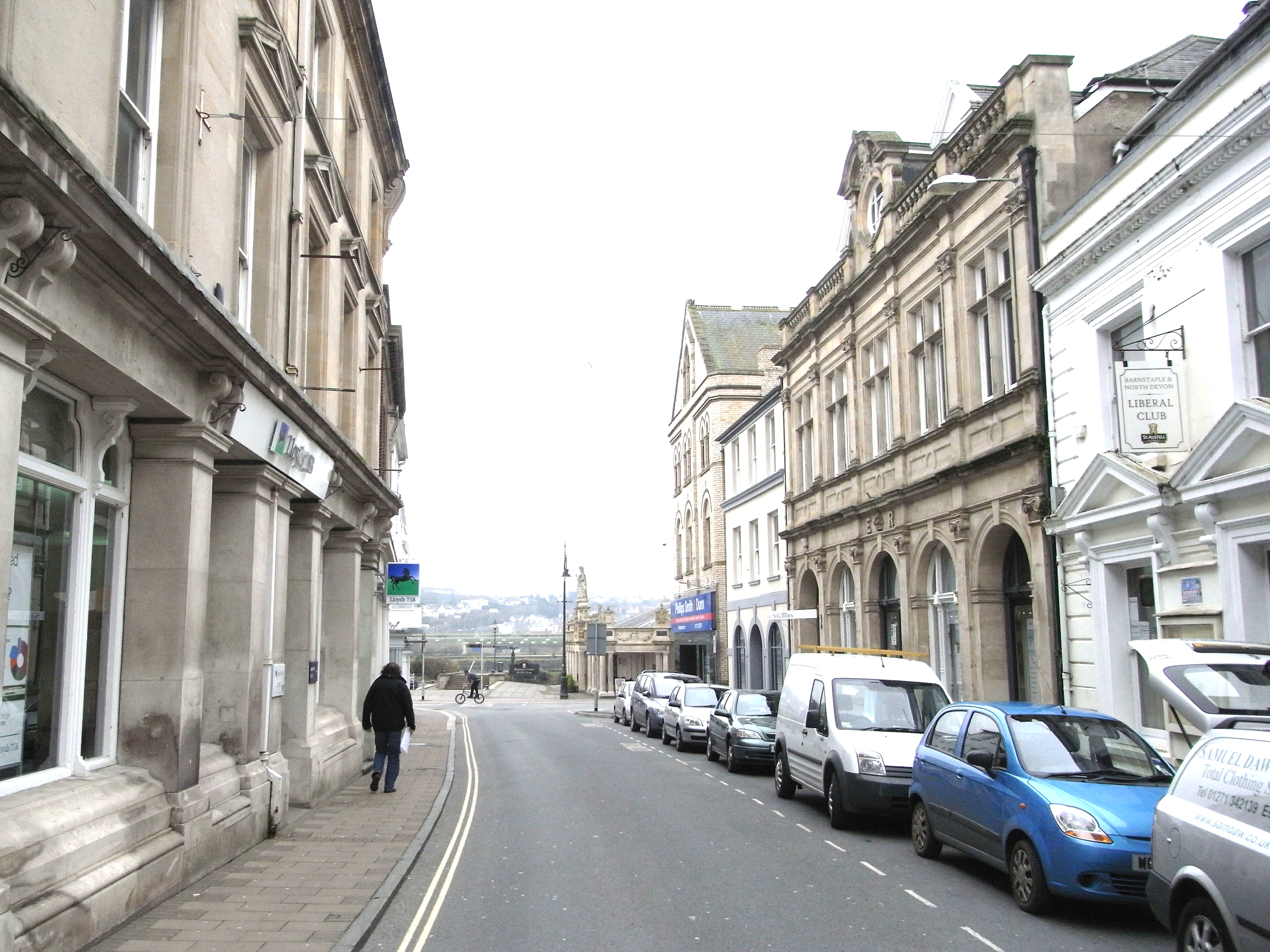
Left: The 16th-century "Dodderidge House" (right), demolished c. 1900, in Cross Street, Barnstaple, Devon, home of Sir John Dodderidge (1555–1628). 19th-century engraving by Jonathan Lomas, view looking down Cross Street from High Cross toward the West Gate (demolished) and to its left the Chapel of St Nicholas. Through the gate is visible the 1708 statue of Queen Anne atop the Mercantile Exchange known today as "Queen Anne's Walk", situated on the old quay of the River Taw where formerly all ships' cargoes were unloaded and sold; right: the same view in 2013

He was son of Richard Doddridge, merchant, of Barnstaple. According to the family's historian, Rev. Sidney E. Dodderidge (1882), the family took its name from the estate of Dotheridge (anciently Dudderidge) in the parish of Alwington in North Devon. They were feudal tenants of the Coffin family of Portledge, lords of the manor of Alwington. In 1250 Sir Richard Coffin renewed his grant of Dudderidge to Thomas de Dudderidge, a supposed ancestor of the Dodderidge family. Other sources, most notably John Prince (d.1723) supposed the family to have originated at the manor of Dodderidge in the parish of Sandford, near Crediton, in Mid-Devon. Richard was the son of a wool merchant and was born in South Molton, in which town he married. With his wife and eight children before 1582 he moved to Holland Street, Barnstaple and served as Mayor of Barnstaple in 1589. A certain John Dodderidge, perhaps a relation, is recorded earlier in 1579 as mayor of Barnstaple. In 1585 he bought a house in Cross Street from his fellow burgess Thomas Skinner, which descended in turn to his sons Sir John and to the latter's brother Pentecost Dodderidge (d. c. 1650), MP for Barnstaple in 1621, 1624 and 1625 and mayor of Barnstaple in 1611, 1627 and 1637. This large timber-framed house, known as the "Dodderidge House" was demolished in about 1900 to make way for a post office, the present large sandstone building with the date "1901" sculpted on its parapet. A room of ornate carved oak panelling dated 1617 from this house survives in Barnstaple Guildhall, known as the "Dodderidge Room" and an ornate overmantel displays the date 1617 between the initials "PD" and "ED", signifying Pentecost and his wife Elizabeth. The room is now used to display the Corporation's silver and the mayor's regalia. Richard entered the shipping business and owned a 100-ton prize-ship named Prudence, a privateer effectively engaged in licensed piracy. She is recorded as having had 80 men on board in 1590, and landed a record prize taken off the Guinea Coast, probably from Spanish galleons from South America, consisting of four chests of gold worth £16,000 with in addition chains of gold and civet-fur. The gold landed at Barnstaple from this voyage weighed 320 lbs. Between June and October 1590 Prudence sent back to Barnstaple two further prizes of unrecorded value and in January 1592 brought in a prize of £10,000. In March 1596 the Privy Council ordered the mayor of Barnstaple to send a ship to challenge two or three Spanish ships in the Irish Sea and the Prudence was selected for this task. She was victualled for five months, for a crew of 40, at a cost exceeding £900, borne by the North Devon population. On 8 August 1596 she returned to Barnstaple, loaded with much pillage taken during the attack on Cádiz conducted by Lords Essex and Howard. Richard received at some time letters patent as one of six west country merchants licensed to trade with "the River of Senegal and Gambia in Guinea". Richard presented to the Corporation of Barnstaple "a great boale with its covering, wrought in silver and a silver-gilt table lamp".

Sir John Dodderidge is said by Hoskins (1959) to have built a new mansion at Bremridge in 1622.

=== Pentecost Dodderidge ===
Sir John Dodderidge's heir was his brother Pentecost Dodderidge (d. circa 1650), MP for Barnstaple in 1621, 1624 and 1625 and mayor of Barnstaple in 1611, 1627 and 1637. Pentecost Dodderidge's heir was his son John Dodderidge (1610–1659), MP (see below). Pentecost had several daughters including:

- Elizabeth Dodderidge, wife of Richard Crossing (born 1608), son of Thomas Crossing (d. 1644) of Exeter (brother of Hugh Crossing, Mayor of Exeter). Bremridge was ultimately inherited by the Crossing family on the failure of the Dodderidge male line. Richard Crossing left no male progeny by his wife Elizabeth Dodderidge, only three married daughters:
  - Sarah Crossing (born 1634), wife of John Blundell
  - Rebecca Crossing (born 1637), wife of John Bankes
  - Dorothy Crossing (born 1637), wife of Edward Fortescue (d. 1702), of Spridlestone, Brixton, Devon, a distant cousin of the Fortescues of Filleigh, who later acquired Bremridge.
- Anne Dodderidge, wife of John Martin of Exeter, a descendant of the mediaeval FitzMartin family, feudal barons of Barnstaple.
- Dorcas (alias Dorothy) Dodderidge (d. 1666), wife of John Lovering of Wear Giffard, Devon.

=== John Dodderidge (1610–1659) ===
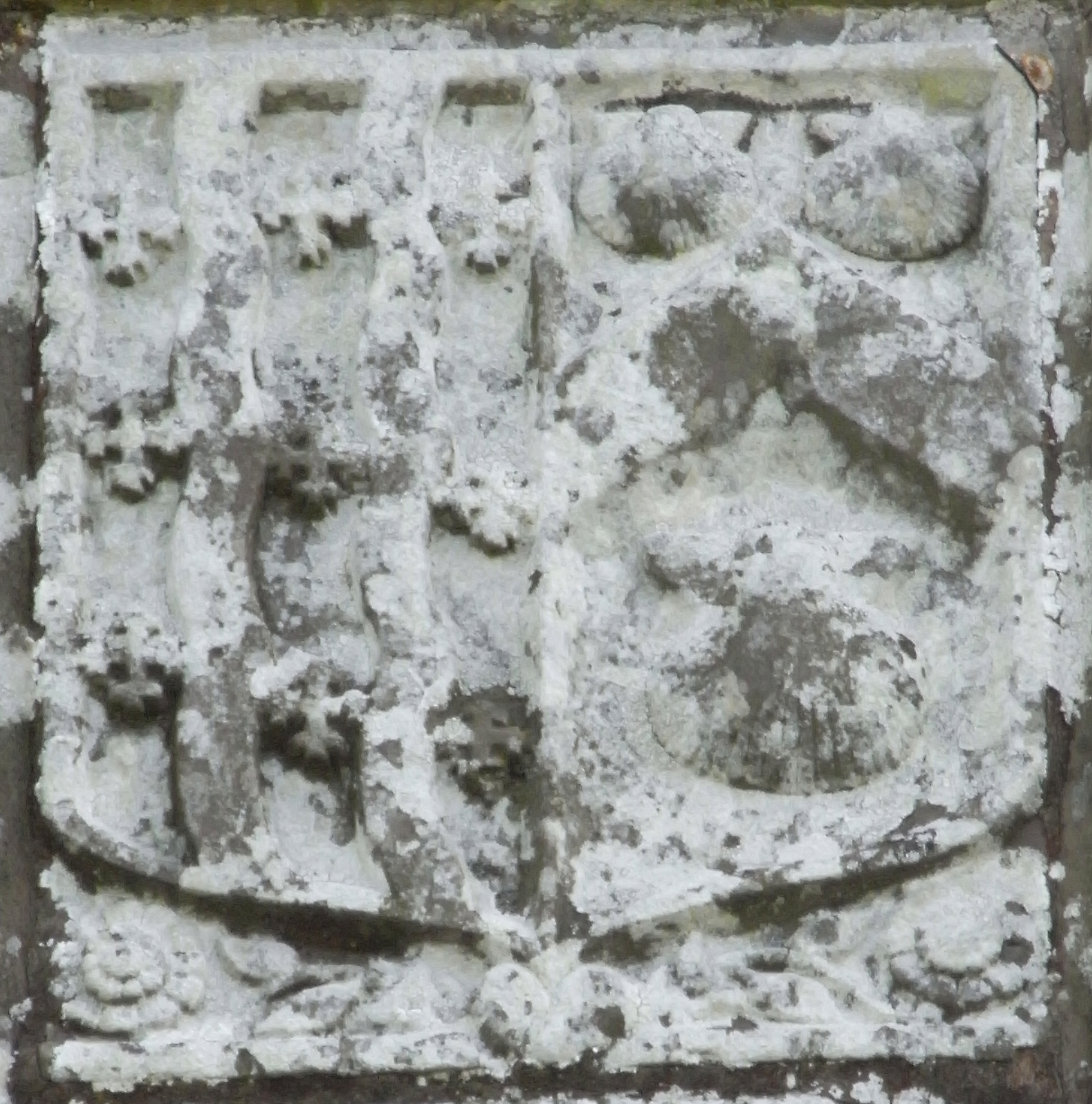
Sculpted stone heraldic escutcheon high above entrance door at Bremridge, displaying arms of Dodderidge (Argent, two pales wavy azure between nine crosses croslet gules) impaling A chevron between three escallops (possibly Gay, Pollard or Wescombe/Westcott, see below)

Pentecost Dodderidge's heir was his son John Dodderidge (1610–1659), MP, whose will, dated 20 Jan 1658 and proved 20 Jun 1659 may be summarised thus:

John Doddridge of Bremeridge, Devon, Esq. 20 January 1658, proved 20 June 1659. If I happen to die within thirty miles of Cheshunt, Herts, my body may be carried thither and there interred in the Vault of my honored father in law Sir Thomas Dacres of Cheshunt, knight, as near the body of my very dear virtuous and truly loving wife Martha, the youngest daughter of the said Sir Thomas Dacres, as conveniently may be, who hath promised me a burying place there according to my great desire. But if I happen to die within thirty miles of the town of Barnastaple, Devon, then I very much desire that my body may be carried to Barnstaple and buried as near the body of my dear virtuous and loving wife Jane as may be. Bequests to the town of Barnstaple, for the poor there, to the aldermen of Bristol (forty pounds) for a piece of plate with my coat of arms engraven upon it and this inscription "Ex Dono Johanni Doddridge Recordatoris Civitatis Bristoll" (i.e "From the gift of John Dodderidge Recorder of the City of Bristol"). To the poor of Ilfracombe, Fremington, and South Molton. My most dear wife Judith. My dear sisters Mistress Elizabeth Crossing, Mistress Dorothy Lowring (i.e. Lovering) and my nephew Master John Martin. My father in law John Gurdon Esq. and my loving brothers John Hele Esq., Thomas Dacres Esq., Robert Gurdon Esq., Master John Martin, Master Richard Crossing, Master John Lowring, Master Joseph Jackson and my friends Master Robert Aldworth, Master Edward Watts and Master Richard Sherbrook. I give and bequeath unto the College in New England towards the maintenance of scholars there the yearly sum of ten pounds forever, issuing and going forth out of my Rectory of Fremington in the County of Devon. I also give and bequeath unto the Trustees for the maintenance of select scholars at the University, according to the model drawn up by Master Poole and other godly ministers, the like yearly sum of ten pounds &c. My cousin Dorothy Watts wife of Master Edward Watts, Sarah Walker daughter of Thomas Walker minister of Assington, Suffolk. Cousin Roger Hill one of the Barons of the Exchequer. My manor of Abbotts Bury in Porbury, in the County of Somerset. My niece Jane Martin.

A monument exists in Cheshunt Church, Hertfordshire, inscribed as follows:

To the memory of Martha Doddridge, wife of John Doddridge, of Branbridge, in the county of Devon, Esq., youngest daughter of Sir Thomas Dacres, of Hertford, Knt., who died in 1655. Many daughters have done virtuously, but thou excellest them all. (Prov. xxx. 29) This is the pillar of Rachel's grave unto this day. (Gen. xxxv. 19, 80).

It would thus appear that the surviving house at Bremridge, apparently originally part of a larger structure, was built by John Dodderidge (1610–1659) as the date "1654" is sculpted on the labels of the Tudor arched front entrance. High above the front door inset into the wall is a stone heraldic displaying the arms of Dodderidge (Argent, two pales wavy azure between nine cross croslets gules) impaling (A chevron sable between three escallops). These appear to be the arms of three possible families: Gay of Goldsworthy and Barnstaple, Westcott or Pollard The senior branch of the influential Pollard family was seated at King's Nympton in Devon and members of the Pollard family were known to have owned land in Bremridge. The identity of the wife bearing these escallop arms is unclear from surviving records. John Dodderidge (1610-1659) is known to have married three times but his only son John predeceased him. His wives included:

- Martha Dacres (d.1655), the youngest daughter of Sir Thomas Dacres of Cheshunt, Hertfordshire.
- Jane
- Judith

One of his wives was the daughter of John Gurdon of Assington Hall, Sudbury, Suffolk. Dodderidge died in 1659 at Cheshunt at the age of about 49. He bequeathed his library of 112 books to his wife Judith who in turn gave or bequeathed them in 1667 to the town of Barnstaple. The collection, known as the Dodderidgian Library (Latin: Bibliotheca Doddridgiana) was housed in a purpose-made building erected at the north-east corner of St Peter's Church, Barnstaple, which survives. The collection is now on permanent loan to the University of Exeter.

As his only son predeceased him, his heirs were his two sisters, Elizabeth Dodderidge, wife of Richard Crossing, and Dorcas Doddridge, the wife of John Lovering (d.1675) "The Elder", of Weare Giffard, a merchant based at Barnstaple who served as one of his executors. John Lovering's son was John Lovering "The Younger" (d.1686) who married Elizabeth Venner daughter of William Venner of Hudscott, Chittlehampton. According to Lysons (1822) Bremridge passed via female heirs of the Dodderidge family to the families of Crossing and Blundell, thence by purchase to Fortescue.

== Fortescue ==
The Devon historian Richard Polwhele (d.1838) in his work History of Devonshire (1793-1806) stated Bremridge to be the property of the Fortescue family (created Earl Fortescue in 1789), whose principal seats were at Weare Giffard and at nearby Filleigh, where in about 1728 Hugh Fortescue, 1st Earl Clinton (1696–1751), built the present grand Palladian mansion Castle Hill on the site of the old manor house. According to Hoskins (1954) part of Bremridge was demolished in about 1830, and the building materials were used elsewhere. In the 1839 Tithe apportionment Bremridge Barton was listed as comprising 301 acres of mixed arable and pasture valued at £30 15s. 3d. The tenants were Henry Skinner and his son John Skinner. Earl Fortescue retained 130 acres of woodland on the estate for his own use, known as Bremridge Wood.

== Hill ==
In 2014 the estate of Bremridge is the property of Tony Hill of nearby Rapscott, the son of Olympic horserider Bertie Hill (1927-2005), gold medallist at the 1956 games in Stockholm. It is let to tenants.

== Sources ==
- Thorn, Caroline & Frank, (eds.) Domesday Book, (Morris, John, gen.ed.) Vol. 9, Devon, Parts 1 & 2, Phillimore Press, Chichester, 1985.
- Sanders, I. J., English Baronies, Oxford, 1960, pp. 104–105, Barony of Barnstaple
- Lamplugh, Lois, Barnstaple: Town on the Taw, Chichester, 2002
- Dodderidge, Rev. Sidney E., Pedigree of Dudderigge alias Dodderidge, of Dotheridge, South Molton, and Barnstaple, Co. Devon, Devon & Cornwall Notes & Queries, vol. 3, no. 5, (1905) pp. 166–169
