= Bremridge Wood =

Wood in Devon

Coordinates: 51.0439°N 3.8722°W

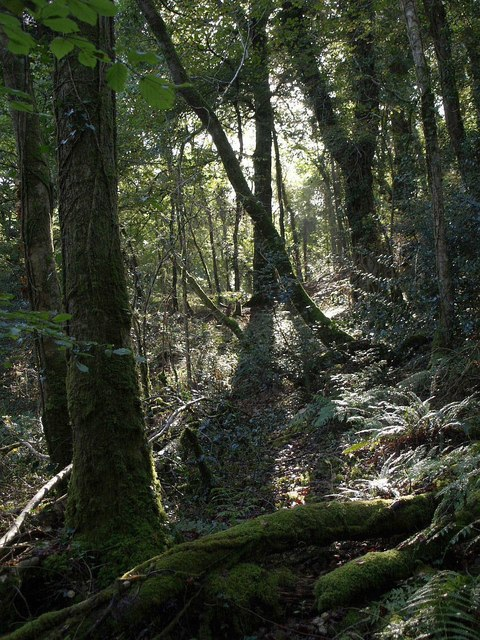
Bremridge Wood

Bremridge Wood, formerly part of the Domesday Book estate of Bremridge near South Molton, Devon, England, is the site of an Iron Age enclosure or hill fort. The earthwork is situated in woodland on a hillside forming a promontory above the River Bray to the west of the town at approximately 175 metres (570 ft) above sea level.
