= Barnstaple Long Bridge =

Bridge in United Kingdom

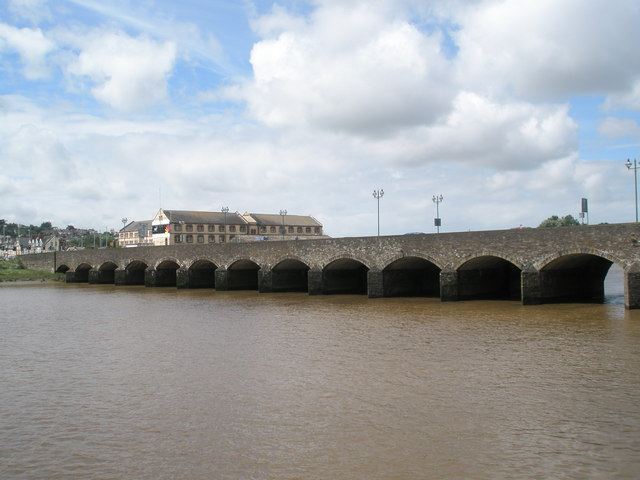
- Barnstaple Long Bridge, seen from the Barnstaple side of the river
- Coordinates: 51.0775°N 4.0600°W
- OS grid reference: SS557329
- Carries: A3125 road
- Crosses: River Taw
- Locale: Barnstaple, Devon, England
- Heritage status: Grade I listed building, ancient monument

Characteristics
- Material: Stone
- Total length: 159 metres (522 ft)
- No. of spans: 16

Barnstaple Long Bridge is a medieval bridge in Barnstaple, North Devon, in south-western England, spanning the River Taw. One of the largest medieval bridges in Britain, it is a Grade I listed building and ancient monument. Another major medieval bridge, the Bideford Long Bridge over the River Torridge, is a few miles away.

== History ==
The date of the first bridge as Barnstaple's main bridge across the River Taw is unclear. A will of 1274 left money for its upkeep and it underwent construction work around 1280 with further work being undertaken in 1333, and the bridge was partially destroyed in 1437 and 1646. It is unclear whether all of the arches were originally built of stone or whether three were wooden (known as "maiden Arches") until replacement in the 16th century.

In 1796, the bridge was widened again. The footpath was added in the 1830s and cast iron used to strengthen the bridge under the direction of James Green. In the 1960s some of the original stonework of the deck was replaced with concrete faced with masonry, above the original stone arches, removing the Victorian ironworks to give the bridge an image identical to how it would have looked between 1796 and 1832.

Traffic congestion was considerable on the bridge until, in May 2007, the Barnstaple Western Bypass was opened so traffic heading towards Braunton and Ilfracombe avoids travelling through the town centre over the ancient bridge. The bypass consists of 1.6 miles (2.6 km) of new road and a 447-yard-long (409 m), five-span bridge. It was expected to have cost £42 million. In 2016 plans were announced to upgrade the bridge including widening of footpaths and the creation of cycle lanes.

== Structure ==
Long Bridge has 16 pointed masonry arches, varying in span from 5.5 metres (18 ft) to 7.9 metres (26 ft) giving a total length of 159 metres (522 ft).
