= River Taw =

River in Devon, England

Taw
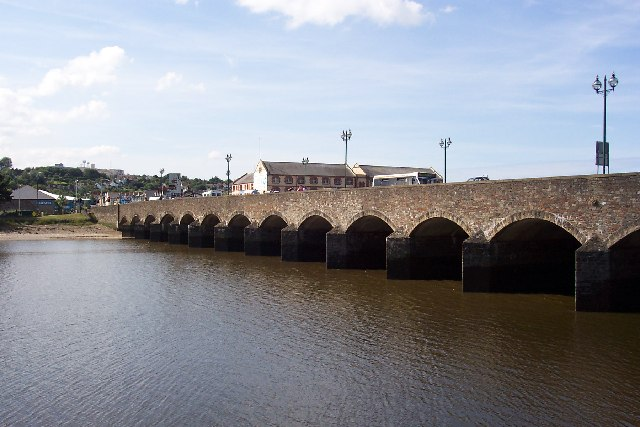

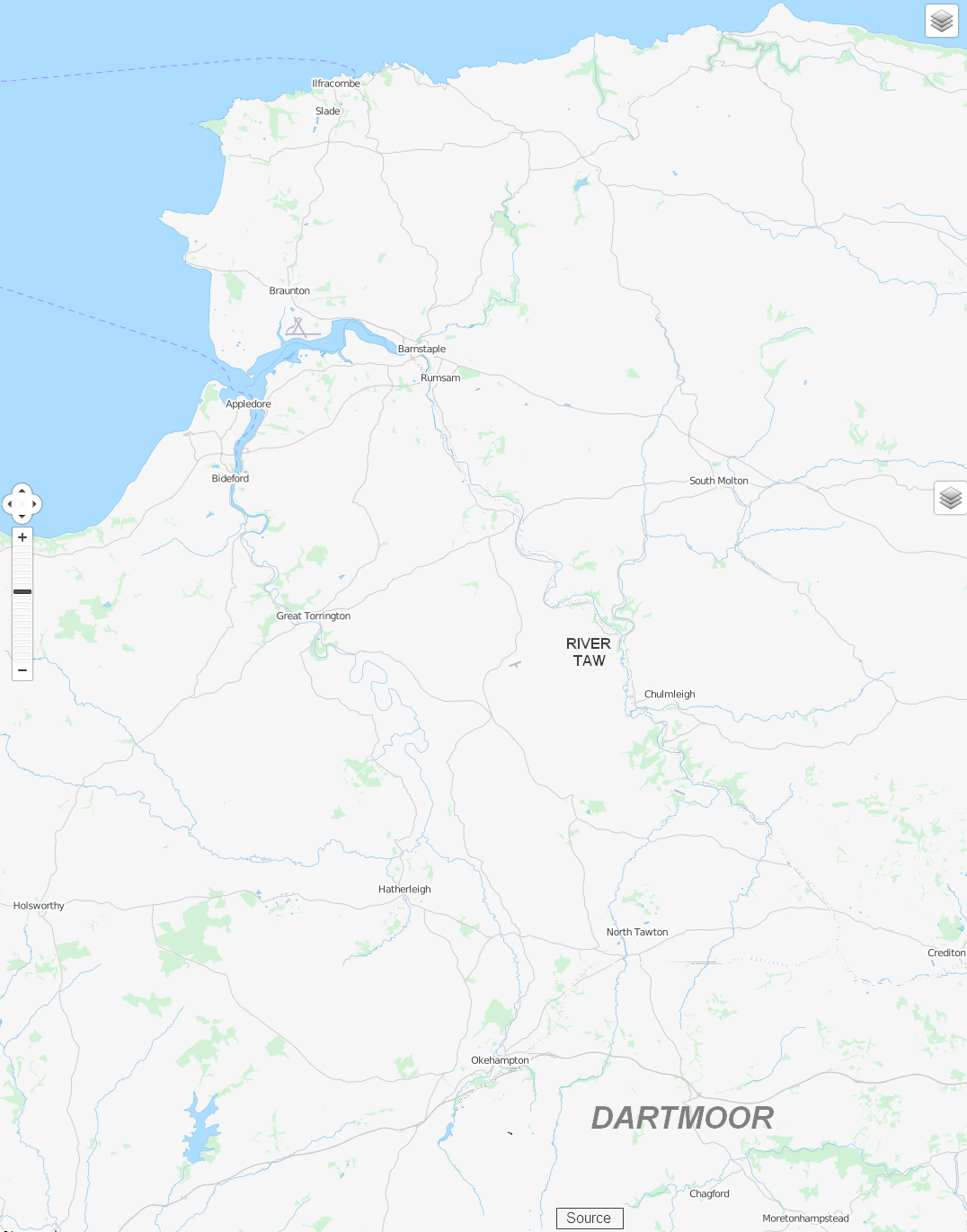

Location
- Country: England
- Counties: Devon
- Towns/Villages: Belstone, Sticklepath, Eggesford, King's Nympton, Umberleigh, Chapelton, Bishop's Tawton, Barnstaple, North Tawton

Physical characteristics
- Source: Taw Head
  - location: Dartmoor
- Mouth
  - location: Barnstaple / Bideford Bay
  - coordinates: 51°05′N 4°13′W
- Length: 72.4 km (45.0 mi)

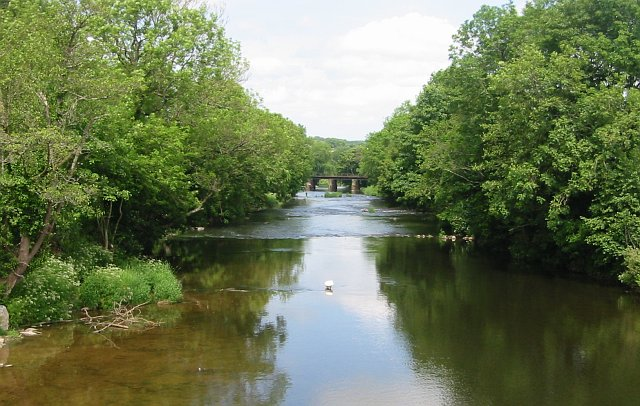
The River Taw at Umberleigh

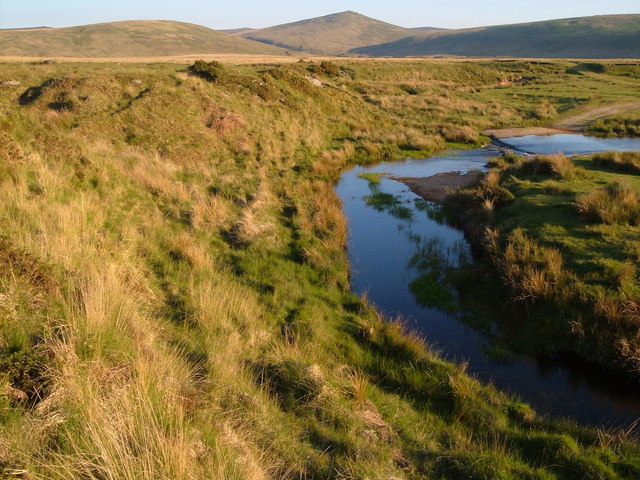
A meander on an uppermost reach of River Taw

The River Taw (/tɔː/) in England rises at Taw Head, a spring on the central northern flanks of Dartmoor, crosses North Devon and at the town of Barnstaple, formerly a significant port, empties into Barnstaple Bay in the Bristol Channel, having formed a large estuary of wide meanders which at its western end is the estuary of the River Torridge.

== Course ==
As a stream, the Taw heads north and gives its name to the villages of South Tawton and North Tawton (Note: Latter life chosen home village of the Poet Laureate Ted Hughes) (Note: Anciently called Cheping or Chipping Tawton, implying Market Tawton). Headwaters add to the size from a number of two major upper course tributaries including the Lapford Yeo and Little Dart River. Along the middle course the Taw receives the River Mole (distributary of the River Bray and a second Yeo) (Note: Sometimes named the "Molland Yeo" to distinguish it from others.), which all rise on upland Exmoor to the north-east. By this midway stage the river has increased in size and becomes a season-round recreational trout, sea trout and salmon river before becoming tidal at Newbridge, approximately 19 km (12 mi) from the sea. The river drains a variable width basin as one of many rivers in the strongly agricultural county, the river has a rolling valley surrounded by (in order of frequency of occurrence) animal pasture, cultivated fields and woodland until near its end. Its length is approximately 72 km (45 mi).

The Tarka Trail named after Tarka the Otter follows much of the river's course.

In 1604, the activity of timber merchants and carpenters who floated timber on the river to Barnstaple angered the landowners, the Earls of Bedford and Bath. The timber damaged banks made to protect marshy ground from flooding.

== List of bridges ==
The following is a list of bridges over the River Taw listed going upstream from the estuary at Barnstaple. The left bank of a river is that on the left of a traveller progressing downstream.

Bridge	Photo	Date Opened	Left bank	Right bank
Taw Bridge (Barnstaple Western Bypass Bridge)		May 2007	Tawstock/Fremington	Pilton
Barnstaple Long Bridge		Medieval	Sticklepath/Tawstock	Barnstaple
Barnstaple Long Bridge is of medieval origin, but has been widened on various occasions by adding width to the upstream side.
Rumsam Bridge		1989	Tawstock	Rumsam/Bishops Tawton
Rumsam Bridge carries the main A39 road between Barnstaple and Bideford, crossing the Taw approximately between Barnstaple and Bishops Tawton
New Bridge		Early 19th century	Tawstock	Bishops Tawton
South of Bishops Tawton. A bridge of medieval origin. Bishop of Exeter Walter de Stapledon (1261–1326) of Annery, Monkleigh bequeathed in his will dated 1326 the sum of 60 shillings for its repair. The present structure probably dates from the early 19th century. A ruined pier of an earlier bridge is visible in mid-stream 140 yards downstream. (see below)
Medieval New Bridge		Medieval	Tawstock	Bishops Tawton
A ruined pier of the medieval New Bridge, in mid-stream 140 yards downstream of the 19th-century New Bridge
Umberleigh Bridge		Rebuilt 1914-15	Atherington	Chittlehampton
Stone tablet on left bank downstream parapet inscribed: Devon County Council. Umberleigh Bridge. Rebuilt 1914-15. ... M. Stead, R.M. Stone, County Surveyors; C. Pollard & Co Ltd, contractors

== Tidal section ==
The river shares the large tidal ranges of the Bristol Channel and daily changes of water depth of 6 m to 8 m are common near its mouth. This effect can also be seen in changes to the tidal-estuarine basin, which is 18 km long. The tidally-influenced river starts at Newbridge, 4 km south of Barnstaple, where the river's width is approximately 20 m. The channel's width increases dramatically over the next 8 km, reaching 1 km by Fremington.

At Barnstaple the Taw is joined by the (Barnstaple) Yeo, which is tidal for a short distance inland. Seawards of Fremington, the small River Caen joins the river on its north bank, the river of Braunton. This tributary was made navigable on its main lower course as the Braunton Canal in the early 19th century.

== River legacy ==
The Taw also gives its name to Bishop's Tawton just before passing through the only town on its route, Barnstaple. The Long Bridge here, originally medieval, is the second-lowest bridging point of the Taw. Work finished in 2007 on the long-awaited 'downstream bridge', part of the Barnstaple Western Bypass and now the Taw's lowest crossing point; it was opened in May 2007. Seawards of Barnstaple, the river's journey is blocked by the large dune complex of Braunton Burrows, hence its late diversion south-westward and shared estuary mouth with the River Torridge across Zulu Bar sandbanks and out into Barnstaple (or Bideford) Bay.

The second lowest port on the Taw is Fremington. Between the mid-19th and mid-20th centuries its tidal quay was the busiest port (tonnage) between Bristol and Lands End, mainly as it was a handy landing point for Welsh coal shipped across the Bristol Channel which could be distributed around the south-west peninsula by train (track finally closed 1987). The lowest port (or at least jetty) can be found at Yelland. The site of a coal-fired power station (closed 1984; demolished 1989), it still is used as a tanker-distribution centre for commercial and domestic petrol and diesel deliveries. The oil storage tanks here are filled from coastal lighters.

== Flooding ==
The flooding of the Taw in August 1983 and the destruction of the sand dune causeway to Crow Island at the southern tip of Braunton Burrows was the inspiration for Ted Hughes' poem to commemorate the christening of Prince William, son of King Charles III - Rain-Charm for the Duchy.

== Rail links ==
Local rail and road routes follow the river from Barnstaple through the centre of the county.

The Southern Railway built a series of 4-6-2 steam locomotives named after various places within the West Country. The locomotive that honours the Taw Valley is preserved in its rebuilt form on the Severn Valley Railway carrying its post-nationalisation number 34027.

== Notes and references ==
Notes
