= River Caen =

River in north Devon, England

Coordinates: 51°04′52″N 4°09′56″W

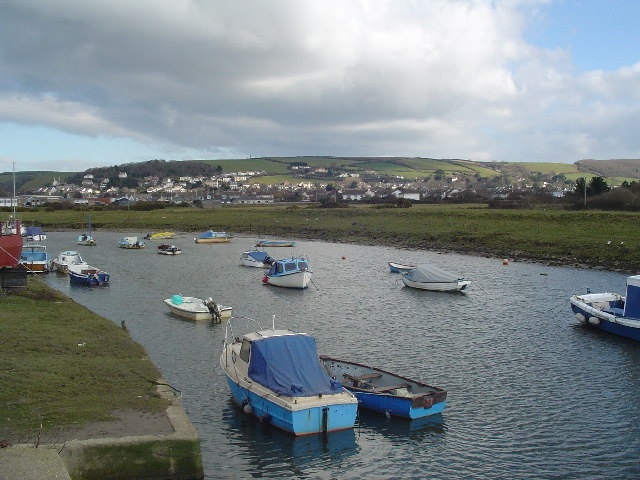
The Caen at Velator Quay.

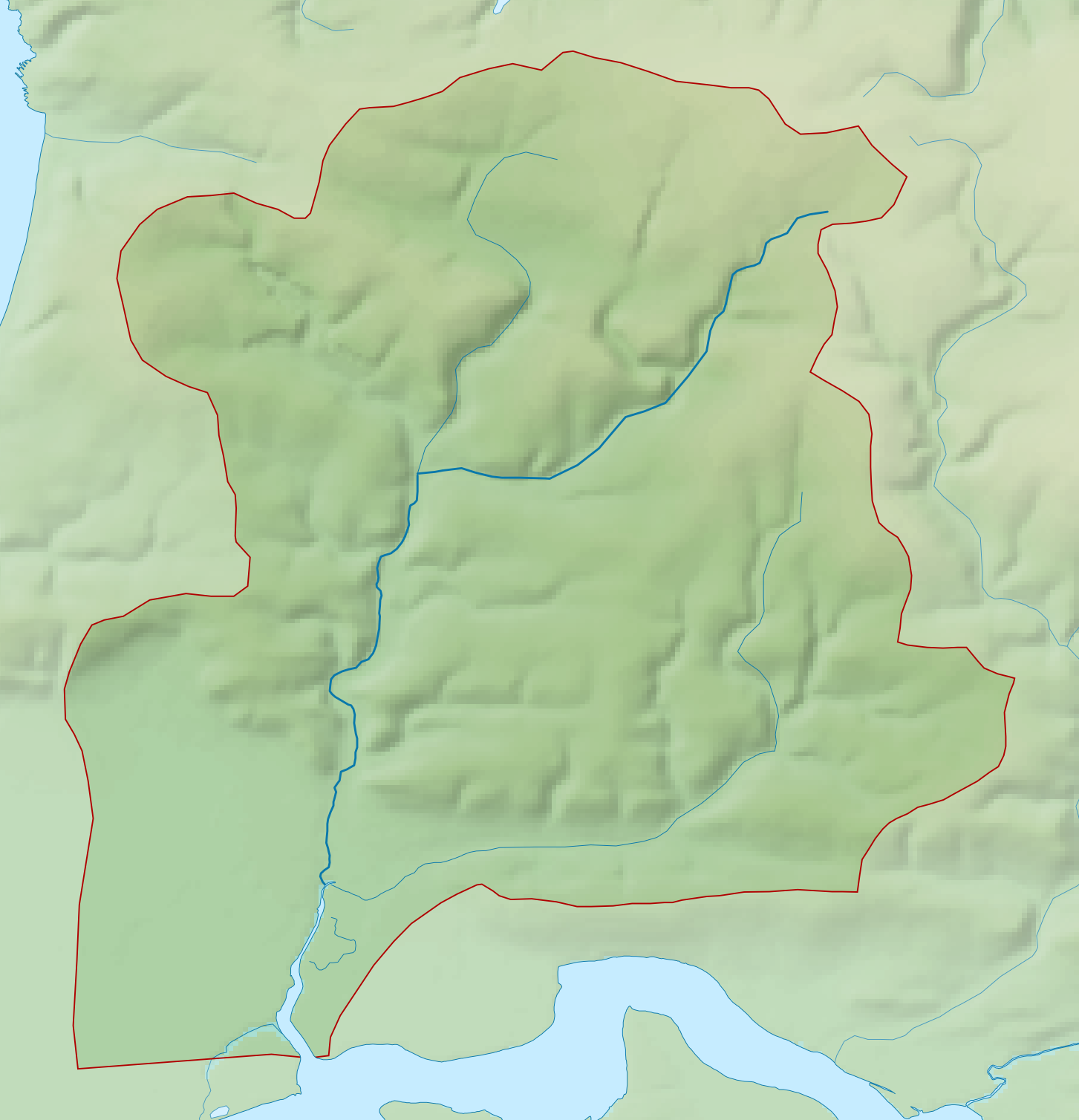
A map of the River Caen drainage basin

The River Caen is a short river running through Braunton in north Devon. It flows into the estuary of the River Taw. It was formerly improved to make it more navigable as the Braunton Canal.

The river is considered a flood risk due to several damaging flash floods in its history.
