= Braunton Canal =

Cut of the River Caen, England

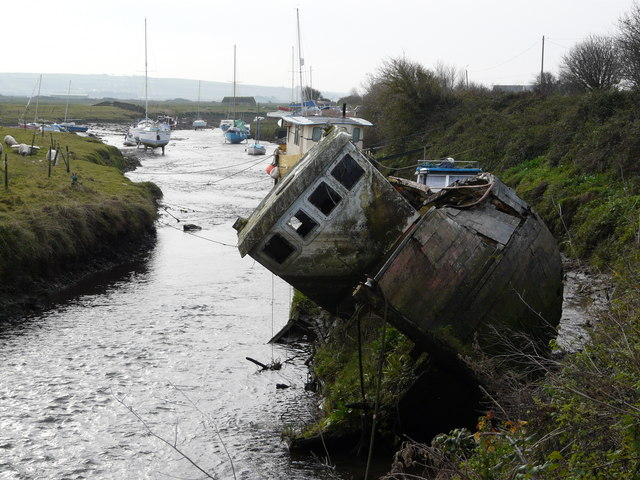
- The River Caen at Velator, looking downstream towards the River Taw.
- Interactive map of Braunton Canal

Specifications
- Locks: 0
- Status: Navigable below Velator

History
- Original owner: Braunton Marsh Commissioners
- Principal engineer: James Green
- Other engineer: William Williams
- Date of act: 1811
- Date of first use: 1814
- Date completed: 1870s

Geography
- Start point: Braunton
- Branch of: River Taw

The Braunton Canal is a cut made to straighten the course of the upper section of the River Caen, known as Braunton Pill, and to provide a new quay for the village of Braunton in North Devon, England. It crosses an area known as Braunton Marsh, which was the subject of Enclosure Acts in the early 19th Century, and was the only one of several schemes which was actually constructed.

== History ==
Before 1808, the area around Braunton, Velator, Wrafton and South Burrow was an extensive salt marsh. In that year, the Board of Agriculture sent Charles Vancouver to investigate the marsh, and his report recommended that it should be enclosed and reclaimed. This met with local approval, and James Green was appointed as engineer for the drainage scheme. Green commissioned John Pascoe to produce a survey and map (held by the Devon Record Office), which outlined two schemes. The first involved an embankment from the mouth of Braunton Pill to Bench Hill, with a canal from the Pill via Wrafton and the edge of Velator Marsh to some lime kilns near what is now Velator Quay. There were concerns about the cost of the project, and objections to parts of the first scheme from the Bassett Estate, and so it was the second scheme that formed the basis for the Braunton Inclosure and Drainage Act 1811 (51 Geo. 3. c. cxxiv) obtained on 25 May 1811, for the Inclosing, Draining, and Embanking Lands in Braunton, in the County of Devon.

Although construction started, and good progress was made, the details appear to have been worked out as the scheme progressed. The scheme was financed by passing the costs on to local farmers and landowners, and by the sale of plots of land once the scheme was complete. The Marsh Commissioners, who had overall responsibility for the scheme, received a letter from 20 farmers objecting to the construction of a lock, which Green had proposed to provide access to the interior of the marsh, and so the lock was not built.

Green also made a proposal for the drainage of Braunton Mere, and an agreement was concluded on 10 September 1814 to carry out this work for £765. The task was completed ahead of schedule, with Green being complemented for the "good, workmanlike manner" in which the work had been conducted.

=== Braunton New Cut ===
Although the original plans for the enclosure of the marsh included the construction of a canal, it was not built, but there remained an intent to develop a quay on Braunton Pill, to replace the quay at Wrafton. To this end, three plots of land were bought in the 1840s, but no further progress was made, until the Bassett Estate was sold to Mr William Williams in 1852. Williams proposed a grand plan to straighten Braunton Pill, and to enclose further fringes of land, together with the area known as Horsey Island, a barren sandbank the enclosing of which Vancouver had suggested was doomed to failure in his original report of 1808. The work was to be financed by Williams, and the Marsh Inspectors, who had taken over responsibility for the marsh once the original enclosure had been completed, gave their approval.

Despite the concerns of the engineer Nicholas Whiteley about the likely hazards of trying to reclaim Horsey Island, the scheme went ahead, with two schemes being put out to tender, one for embankments around Horsey Island and the other for the construction of the new cut and the embankments on Braunton Pill. Calls for subcontractors, 200 navvies and a haulier to move 60,000 yards of stone from Braunton Down and other quarries were made in October 1854. There were some financial difficulties, and vandalism on the Heanton embankment in 1855. The upper section of the new cut was constructed through clay, but the lower section was though sand, which provided significant difficulties. The channel was lined with clay, with the base covered in gravel, and pumps were required to operate continuously to enable the work to proceed. Despite the problems, the works were finished within the three-year timescale, and costs of £13,394 were slightly under the budget price.

Mr Williams also financed the new quay at Velator, which opened around 1870. The quay was sufficient for ships of up to 130 tons, and continued to be used for unloading gravel until the 1960s. At the same time as the opening of the quay, repairs were required to some of the embankments on the new cut, which were subsiding as a result of the material on which they were constructed. In 1910, the North Devon Coast was hit by severe storms, and the embankments around Horsey Island were breached in several places. A breach also occurred in the walls of the new cut, with local newspapers describing a boat passing through the breach onto the marsh, and back out again when the tide turned, but few other details are known, as contemporary sources were more concerned with the task of repairing the embankments around Horsey Island.

== Today ==
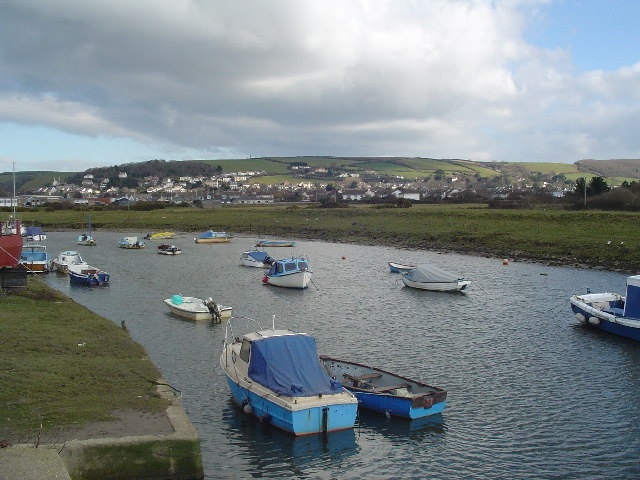
The River Caen at Velator Quay, looking towards Braunton East Hill

Velator Quay and the surrounding area is used as a mooring for small boats. In 2006 Braunton council blocked vehicular access to the quay as it was found to be in danger of collapse. An engineering survey was conducted on the quay in 2010, by consultants Bolgar Sykes, as the council were hoping to make it more of an amenity. The survey revealed several possible options for repair, ranging in cost from £80,000 to £400,000. The limited budget available to the council for such work meant that only basic repairs were considered. A subsequent report by Peter Lord, one of the parish counsellors, recommended that demolition of the quay would be the best long-term option, with the provision of a slipway to assist boat owners. The quay is widely held to be a free port, this status having been awarded to Barnstaple seamen who fought against the Spanish Armada. However, the report highlighted the fact that this is likely to be just a local legend, as the quay was not constructed until 300 years after the event.

Below Braunton, the original course of the River Caen remains as isolated ponds on the inland side of the embankments: these ponds are an important habitat for birds.

== Points of interest ==
| Point | Coordinates (Links to map resources) | OS Grid Ref | Notes |
|---|---|---|---|
| Braunton Bridge | 51.1008°N 4.1627°W | SS486357 | Normal tidal limit |
| End of new cut | 51.0933°N 4.1679°W | SS482349 | |
| Pill's mouth | 51.0812°N 4.1655°W | SS484335 | Jn with River Taw |

== See also ==
- Canals of Great Britain
- History of the British canal system

== Bibliography ==
- Hadfield, Charles (1967). The Canals of South West England. David and Charles. ISBN 0-7153-4176-6.
- Manning, Clare (2007). "Braunton Marsh Management Scheme" (PDF). Taw Torridge Estuary Forum. Archived from the original on 8 October 2007.
