= Barnstaple Western Bypass =

Bypass road in South West England

The Barnstaple Western Bypass is a congestion-relief scheme designed to take road traffic away from the town centre of Barnstaple, a market town in Devon, South West England. Construction of the new road started in the spring of 2005 and it was opened on 23 May 2007.

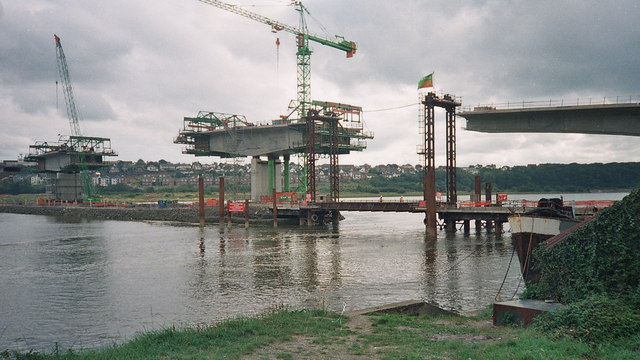
Barnstaple Western Bypass during construction

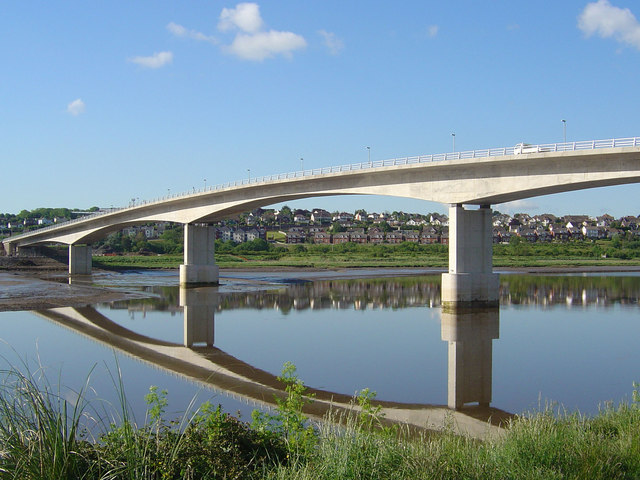
Completed bridge over the River Taw

== History ==
The scheme consists of a single two-lane carriageway, one roundabout and three traffic signal controlled junctions. 1.7 miles (2.7 km) of new road was constructed and a 409 metres (447 yards) long, five-span, downstream bridge was built across the River Taw. A new roundabout was created between the Newport and Roundswell roundabouts: this has a feeder lane which provides easy access from the A39 Atlantic Highway to the A361 Braunton Road which generates much of Barnstaple's traffic.

The bridge is a balanced cantilever design with reinforced concrete box girders supporting the arms.

Other constructions include stream culverts, two pedestrian/cycleway underpasses, minor retaining walls, and a 100-metre three span viaduct providing access for buses, cyclists and pedestrians to Barnstaple railway station. The plans allowed for reopening of the Barnstaple-Bideford railway, should this become financially viable.

As with any project of this scale, many companies were employed in the development. Edmund Nuttall Ltd., a major civil engineering group, was the main contractor. It was estimated to cost £42 million. £38 million of this amount came from the central government. Devon County Council also contributed.

An economic impact study estimated that after 5 years the project would generate an extra £248 million in business turnover and would create 1,280 jobs.

=== Opening ceremony ===
Up to 20,000 people were expected to attend the Taw Bridge Family Fun Day.

The event was organised to raise money for charity and to commemorate the completion of the Western Bypass and Downstream Bridge.

The ceremony took place on the Pottington side of the bridge at 11:00 and members of the public were able to walk over the new bridge from 11:30. A Fun Run started from Park School at 12:00.

At 14:30 A tug-of-war competition took place on the bridge itself .

A final grand parade was to start at 16:00 and at 17:30 an evening concert in St Peter's Church was to end the day.

== Critics ==
Critics said that the Western Bypass would endanger wildlife and the environment. Friends of the Earth campaigner and Green Party candidate Anthony Bown claimed it would disturb large numbers of seabirds on the Taw and Torridge Estuary, along with the habitat of endangered otters.

They were also worried that the bypass would attract more vehicles and therefore further contribute to pollution, but it was also argued that the bypass reduced pollution by substantially reducing traffic jams and journey times in and around Barnstaple.

Some locals were also upset that the decoration chosen for one of the new roundabouts comprised Cornish stone, as the road is really a gateway to North Devon.

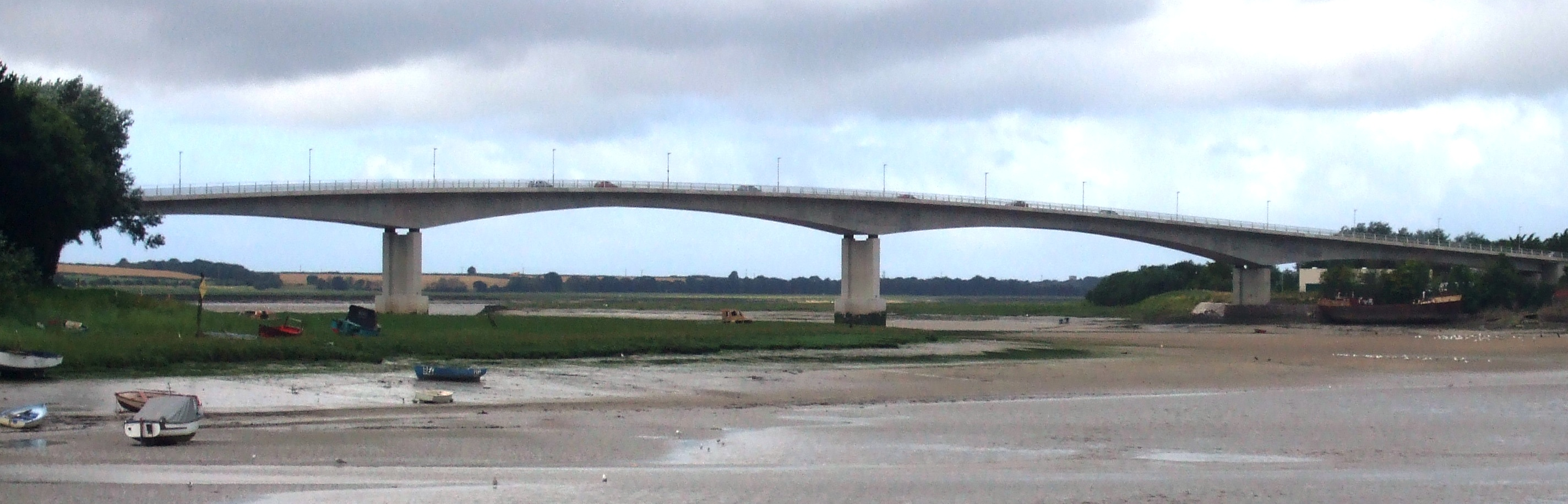
Taw Bridge from Barnstaple

The old railway line from Barnstaple to Bideford was partially built over, meaning it will be more expensive to re-open the line in the future.
