= River Bray =

River in North Devon, England

Coordinates: 50.99035°N 3.88850°W

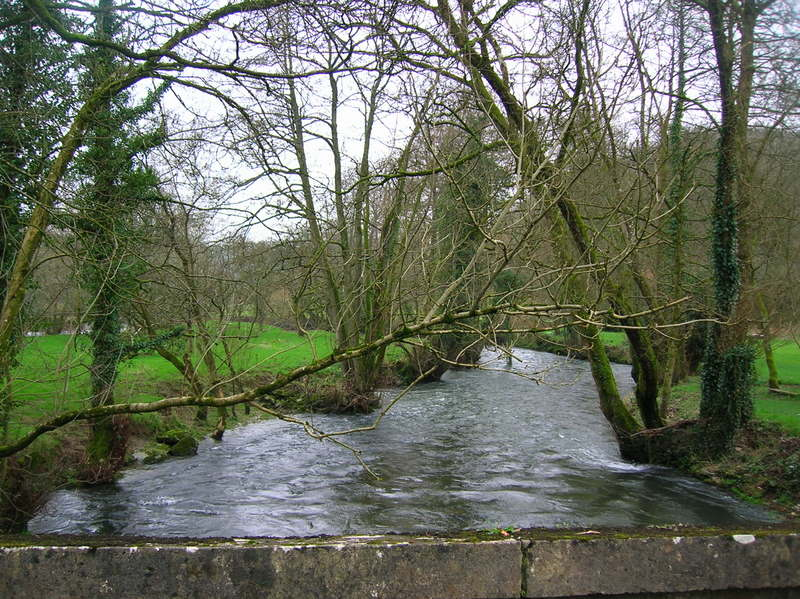
River Bray near Meethe

The River Bray is a small river in North Devon, England. It is a tributary of the River Mole, which in turn is a tributary of the River Taw. It rises in Exmoor, near the border with Somerset.

== Geology ==
Generally, the river is quite shallow, but it can be prone to flooding. In the Lynmouth Flood, the Bray was affected by the unseasonably high rainfall, and burst its banks, killing a group of schoolboy campers at Filleigh.

== Villages ==
The River Bray has given its names to several villages, such as Brayford.
