= Clevland =

Clevland may refer to:

- Clevland Town, Bangalore, a suburb of Cox Town, Bangalore

== People with the surname ==
- Augustus Clevland (1754–1784), East India Company administrator in the Province of Bengal
- John Clevland (1706–1763) of Tapeley, Westleigh, Devon, MP and Secretary to the Admiralty
- John Clevland (1734–1817) of Tapeley, Westleigh, Devon, Member of Parliament for Barnstaple from 1766 to 1802
- William Clevland (1664–1734) of Tapeley, Westleigh, Devon, Royal Navy commander, Controller of Storekeepers' Accounts
- William Clevland (king) (1720–1758), Anglo-Scot, self-appointed King of the Banana Islands off the coast of present-day Sierra Leone

== See also ==
- Cleland (disambiguation)
- Cleveland (disambiguation)
- Clevelandia (disambiguation)
