= Grade I listed buildings in North Devon =

There are over 9,000 Grade I listed buildings in England. This page is a list of these buildings in the district of North Devon in Devon.

== List of buildings ==
Name	Location	Type	Completed (Note: The date given is the date used by Historic England as significant for the initial building or that of an important part in the structure's description.)	Date designated	Grid ref. (Note: The grid reference is based on the British national grid reference system, sometimes known as OSGB36, used by the Ordnance Survey.) Geo-coordinates	Entry number (Note: The "List Entry Number" is a unique number assigned to each listed building and scheduled monument by Historic England.)	Image
Barton including adjoining hothouse to rear courtyard and remains of chapel, Umberleigh House	Atherington	House	Late 15th century	25 February 1965	SS5935724599; 51°00′13″N 4°00′21″W	1106855	Barton including adjoining hothouse to rear courtyard and remains of chapel, Umberleigh House More images
Church of St Mary	Atherington	Church	15th century	25 March 1965	SS5912123123; 50°59′25″N 4°00′31″W	1106857	Church of St Mary More images
Bull House	Pilton	House	Early or mid-16th century	19 January 1951	SS5562034118; 51°05′17″N 4°03′46″W	1385078	Upload Photo
Long Bridge	Barnstaple	Bridge	13th century	19 January 1951	SS5577832921; 51°04′39″N 4°03′37″W	1384979	Long Bridge More images
Church of St Mary the Virgin	Pilton	Church	14th century	19 January 1951	SS5565134146; 51°05′18″N 4°03′45″W	1385316	Church of St Mary the Virgin More images
Penrose Almshouses	Barnstaple	Almhouses	1627	19 January 1951	SS5604632855; 51°04′37″N 4°03′23″W	1385215	Penrose Almshouses More images
Queen Anne's Walk	Barnstaple	Exchange	1708	19 January 1951	SS5569033110; 51°04′45″N 4°03′41″W	1385370	Queen Anne's Walk More images
St Anne's Chapel and Old Grammar School Museum including walls and gates and piers	Barnstaple	Chapel	Early/mid-16th century	19 January 1951	SS5588533210; 51°04′48″N 4°03′32″W	1385253	St Anne's Chapel and Old Grammar School Museum including walls and gates and piers More images
62 Boutport Street	Barnstaple	House	1620	19 January 1951	SS5589633057; 51°04′43″N 4°03′31″W	1385041	62 Boutport Street More images
Church of St Mary	Bishop's Nympton	Church	15th century	20 February 1967	SS7576523734; 50°59′58″N 3°46′19″W	1107268	Church of St Mary More images
Whitechapel Manor	Bishop's Nympton	Cross-passage house	Late 16th/early 17th century	9 June 1952	SS7509227282; 51°01′53″N 3°46′58″W	1107264	Whitechapel Manor More images
Garden walls and gate piers to garden immediately south of Whitechapel Manor	Bishop's Nympton	Gate Pier	Early 18th century	20 February 1967	SS7510827256; 51°01′52″N 3°46′57″W	1309508	Garden walls and gate piers to garden immediately south of Whitechapel Manor More images
Church of St John the Baptist	Bishop's Tawton	Church	14th century	25 February 1965	SS5654630098; 51°03′08″N 4°02′53″W	1366220	Church of St John the Baptist More images
Church of St Brannock	Braunton	Church	13th century	25 February 1965	SS4891637072; 51°06′47″N 4°09′35″W	1325560	Church of St Brannock More images
Church of All Saints	High Bray, Brayford	Church	1717	25 February 1965	SS6893434319; 51°05′35″N 3°52′23″W	1107558	Church of All Saints More images
Church of the Holy Trinity	Burrington	Church	13th century	20 February 1967	SS6377216654; 50°56′00″N 3°56′24″W	1325731	Church of the Holy Trinity More images
Church of St Hieritha	Chittlehampton	Church	Late 15th/early 16th century	20 February 1967	SS6359825590; 51°00′48″N 3°56′45″W	1273408	Church of St Hieritha More images
Church of St. Mary Magdalene	Chulmleigh	Church	15th century	25 October 1988	SS6868114152; 50°54′43″N 3°52′09″W	1325762	Church of St. Mary Magdalene More images
Colleton Manor	Chulmleigh	House	1612	9 June 1952	SS6688014674; 50°54′58″N 3°53′42″W	1106728	Upload Photo
Gatehouse at Colleton Manor	Chulmleigh	Chapel	Probably 15th century	20 February 1967	SS6686614645; 50°54′57″N 3°53′43″W	1106729	Upload Photo
Church of St Peter Ad Vincula	Combe Martin	Church	1753	25 February 1965	SS5862646305; 51°11′54″N 4°01′29″W	1106799	Church of St Peter Ad Vincula More images
Church of St Mary	Worlington	Church	Predominantly 15th century	20 February 1967	SS7699213485; 50°54′28″N 3°45′03″W	1107298	Church of St Mary More images
Church of St George	Georgeham	Church	13th century	25 February 1965	SS4648839887; 51°08′15″N 4°11′44″W	1107755	Church of St George More images
Church of St Augustine	Heanton Punchardon	Church	13th century	25 February 1965	SS5021535587; 51°06′00″N 4°08′26″W	1107743	Church of St Augustine More images
Church of St Michael	Horwood, Lovacott and Newton Tracey	Church	13th century	25 February 1965	SS5021927690; 51°01′44″N 4°08′14″W	1325319	Church of St Michael More images
Church of Holy Trinity	Ilfracombe	Church	1861–64	15 June 1951	SS5140647305; 51°12′20″N 4°07′43″W	1208207	Church of Holy Trinity More images
St Nicholas' Chapel and Lighthouse	Ilfracombe	Chapel	Possibly 14th century	15 June 1951	SS5251247891; 51°12′40″N 4°06′46″W	1208792	St Nicholas' Chapel and Lighthouse More images
Church of St John the Baptist	Instow	Church	Late 13th/early 14th century	25 February 1965	SS4797530987; 51°03′29″N 4°10′14″W	1107600	Church of St John the Baptist More images
Church of St James	King's Nympton	Church	13th century	20 February 1967	SS6821919456; 50°57′34″N 3°52′40″W	1153053	Church of St James More images
King's Nympton Park	King's Nympton	Villa	1746–50	9 June 1952	SS6728119549; 50°57′36″N 3°53′28″W	1152957	King's Nympton Park More images
Acland Barton and Chapel	Landkey	Farmhouse	15th century	25 February 1965	SS5941232534; 51°04′30″N 4°00′29″W	1107676	Acland Barton and Chapel More images
Church of St Paul	Landkey	Church	15th century	18 March 1986	SS5906131141; 51°03′44″N 4°00′46″W	1107687	Church of St Paul More images
Church of St Michael	Marwood	Church	1762	25 February 1965	SS5440137561; 51°07′08″N 4°04′54″W	1107157	Church of St Michael More images
Church of Saint Mary	Molland	Church	15th–16th century	20 February 1967	SS8079328393; 51°02′33″N 3°42′06″W	1288998	Church of Saint Mary More images
Church of St Mary Magdalene	Mortehoe	Church	12th century	25 February 1965	SS4569445190; 51°11′06″N 4°12′33″W	1107750	Church of St Mary Magdalene More images
Church of All Saints	North Molton	Church	19th century	20 February 1967	SS7366829955; 51°03′18″N 3°48′14″W	1288637	Church of All Saints More images
Church of St Petrock	Parracombe	Church	13th century	25 February 1965	SS6747244949; 51°11′18″N 3°53′52″W	1325740	Church of St Petrock More images
Church of All Saints	Rackenford	Church	Possibly 13th century	20 February 1967	SS8507518211; 50°57′07″N 3°38′15″W	1325445	Church of All Saints More images
South Yarde Farmhouse	Rose Ash	Farmhouse	Late 15th/early 16th century	20 February 1967	SS7717721230; 50°58′38″N 3°45′03″W	1325489	Upload Photo
Church of St Peter	Satterleigh	Church	Principally early 15th century	20 February 1967	SS6681422522; 50°59′12″N 3°53′56″W	1258740	Church of St Peter More images
Church of St Peter	Shirwell	Church	1756	25 February 1965	SS5978237434; 51°07′08″N 4°00′17″W	1107134	Church of St Peter More images
Youlston Park	Shirwell	Manor house	Late 17th century	25 February 1965	SS5864637408; 51°07′07″N 4°01′16″W	1163754	Youlston Park More images
Church of St Mary Magdalene	South Molton	Church	15th century	20 August 1951	SS7138925965; 51°01′07″N 3°50′06″W	1317855	Church of St Mary Magdalene More images
Guild Hall (including Borough Museum)	South Molton	Court rom	1743	20 August 1951	SS7142925841; 51°01′03″N 3°50′04″W	1106866	Guild Hall (including Borough Museum) More images
South Molton Cemetery Chapels	South Molton	Cemetery chapels	c.1860	31 October 1986	SS7157625521; 51°00′53″N 3°49′56″W	1164382	South Molton Cemetery Chapels More images
Church of St Bartholomew	Stoke Rivers	Church	Late 15th/early 16th century	25 February 1965	SS6333135469; 51°06′08″N 3°57′12″W	1107658	Church of St Bartholomew More images
Church of St James	Swimbridge	Church	13th century	25 February 1965	SS6209829994; 51°03′10″N 3°58′08″W	1107640	Church of St James More images
Church of St Peter	Tawstock	Church	1680	25 February 1965	SS5597729924; 51°03′02″N 4°03′22″W	1261627	Church of St Peter More images
Church of Holy Trinity	West Down	Church	13th century	25 February 1965	SS5164642023; 51°09′29″N 4°07′22″W	1366233	Church of Holy Trinity More images
Church of St Peter	Westleigh	Church	13th century	25 February 1965	SS4726028635; 51°02′12″N 4°10′48″W	1163906	Church of St Peter More images
Church of St John the Baptist	Witheridge	Church	1841	20 February 1967	SS8032614569; 50°55′05″N 3°42′14″W	1305506	Church of St John the Baptist More images
