= Queen Anne's Walk =

Building in Barnstaple, Devon, England

Coordinates: 51.0792°N 4.0615°W

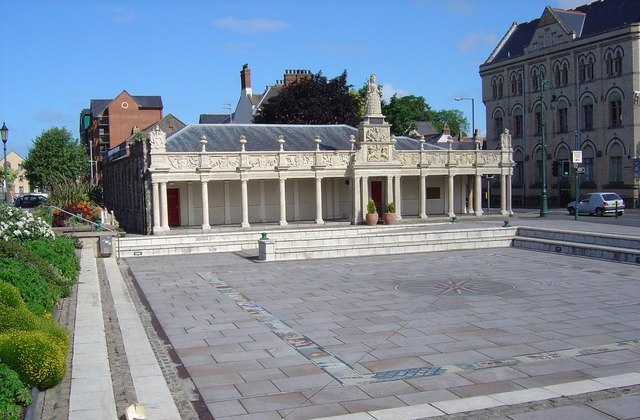
Queen Anne's Walk, Barnstaple, south front. Immediately left is the River Taw. Before being filled-in, the large sunken rectangular paved area in front was Barnstaple Quay at which merchant ships loaded and unloaded

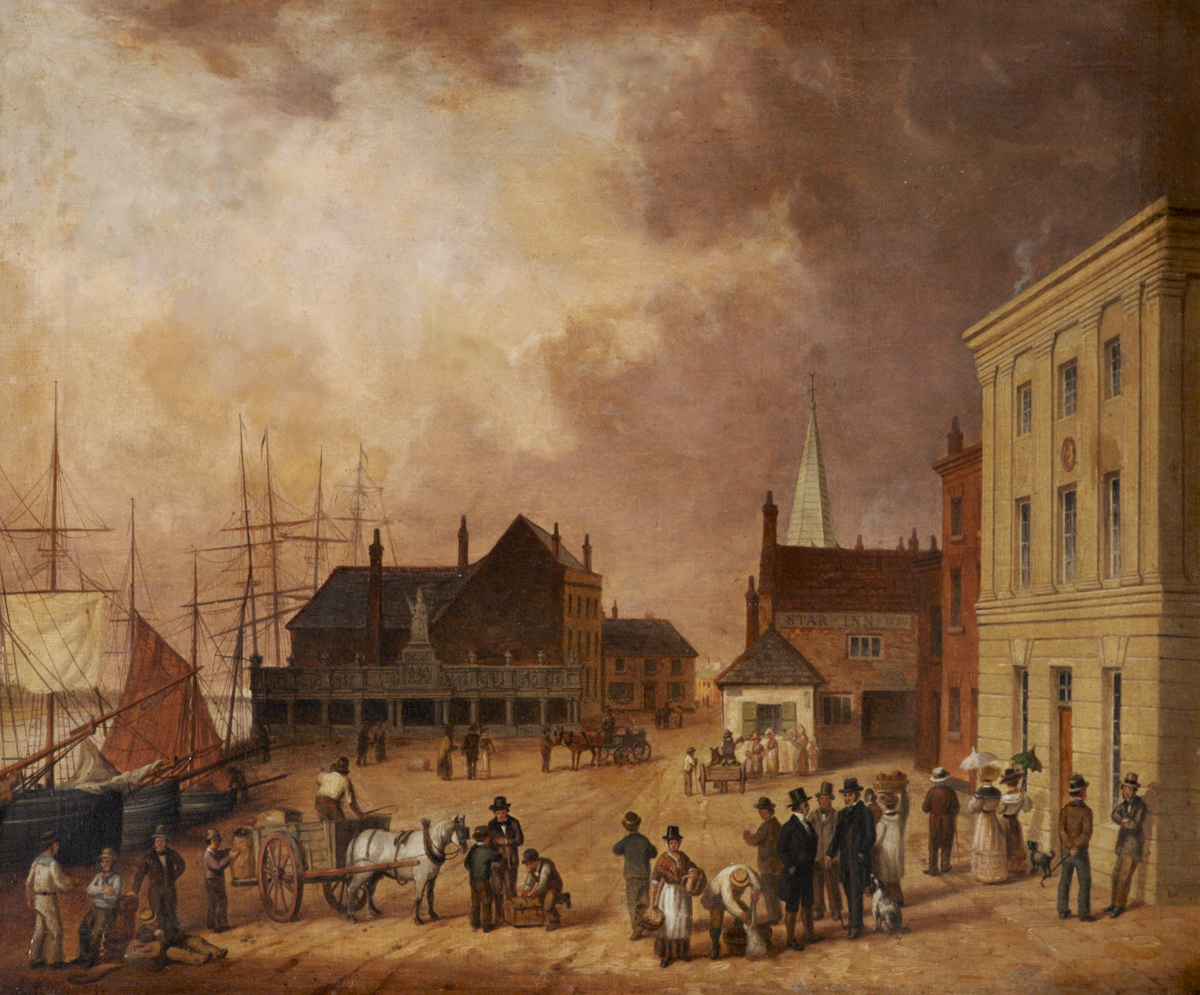
"The Strand, Barnstaple", painted c.1880s by Joseph Kennedy (c.1838–1893), view looking northward. Visible buildings are Queen Anne's Walk (The Mercantile Exchange); Star Hotel (background right, demolished); steeple of St Nicholas's Chapel by West Gate (all demolished). Collection of Barnstaple Town Council, displayed in Barnstaple Guildhall

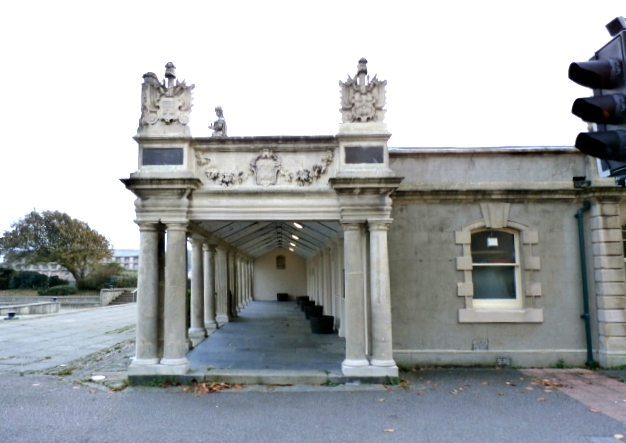
Queen Anne's Walk, East side. In the centre of the parapet are shown the arms of Chichester; raised above to the left are those of the Borough of Barnstaple, to the right those of Robert Incledon, Mayor of Barnstaple 1712–13, who supervised the building process. The two contemporary brass tablets inscribed in Latin record the essential history of the building

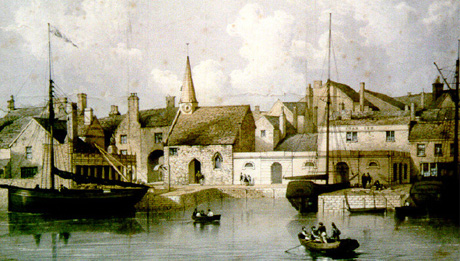
Barnstaple Quay, 19th century, viewed from the River Taw. Queen Anne's Walk to left

Queen Anne's Walk (formerly The Mercantile Exchange) is a grade I listed building in the town of Barnstaple, North Devon, completed in 1713 as a meeting place for the town's merchants. It is believed to have been designed by the architect William Talman, on the basis of its similarity to his work at the Hall in Drayton, Northamptonshire. It was promoted and financed by the thirteen members of the Corporation of Barnstaple whose armorials are sculpted on and above the parapet, and the work was overseen by Robert Incledon (1676–1758), Mayor of Barnstaple in 1712–13. It has been owned for many decades by North Devon District Council, which in 2018 converted the building into a cafe. https://cafeonthestrand.co.uk/

== Location and function ==
Tome stone 28/10/2026

The building is situated at the bottom of Cross Street on the bank of the River Taw, and looked onto Barnstaple Quay, ("New Quay" after the 1870s), (now filled in) at which most of the sea-trade of the formerly important port of Barnstaple would arrive and depart. Here cargoes shipped from around the world, including notably tobacco from the North American colonies, would arrive and be sold to awaiting Barnstaple merchants, who were accustomed to seal deals by touching the 17th century so-called Tome Stone, a low stone circular bargaining table, with inscriptions around the rim of the names of three leading merchants, including Delbridge. In 1909 the Tome stone was moved to beneath the colonnade. Due to changes in the river bed, larger ships were unable to traverse the river and access the port http://barthh.org/river-taw/. The lack of trade resulted in there being no need for a trading hub.

== Description ==
It consists of a low single-story building fronted by a white Beer stone colonnade of ten bays, five to the left of the central bay supporting a statue of Queen Anne and four to the right. Above the columns and wrapping around the east side by one bay, is a parapet decorated with relief sculpted garlanded heraldic escutcheons, one per bay, showing the arms of eleven leading aristocratic, gentry and mercantile families of North Devon, with the arms of the Borough of Barnstaple forming a twelfth.

== Construction ==
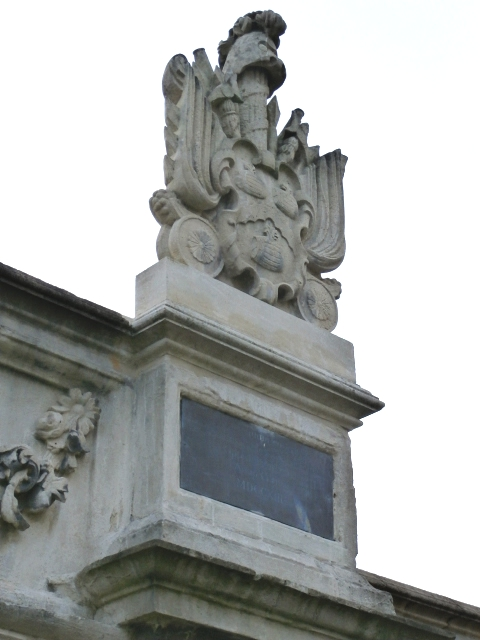
Arms and brass tablet relating to Robert Incledon on Queen Anne's Walk, Barnstaple, the construction of which he supervised in 1713

=== Supervision ===
It was completed in 1713 under the supervision of Robert Incledon (1676–1758), who in 1746 built Pilton House adjoining Barnstaple, a lawyer of New Inn, London, a Clerk of the Peace for Devon, Deputy Recorder of Barnstaple and twice Mayor of Barnstaple, in 1712 and 1721. In 1713 as mayor he supervised the building of the Mercantile Exchange as is recorded on the east parapet of the building by a contemporary brass plaque inscribed in Latin as follows:

Faciendum curavit Robertus Incledon Generosus Oppidi Praefectus Anno Christi MDCCXIII ("Robert Incledon, Esquire, Prefect (i.e. Mayor) of this town, supervised the making. 1713")

Above is a sculpted escutcheon with his armorials: Argent, a chevron engrailed between three tuns sable fire issuing from the bung hole proper. (The ancient building known as the "Three Tuns Inn" on the west side of Barnstaple High Street is in 2015 now the Pizza Express restaurant). Above is a plumed helm placed on a fasces, part of an antique trophy of arms. He was the younger brother of Henry Incledon (1671–1736) of Buckland House, Braunton, whose arms are shown on the front (south) parapet, a son-in-law of the merchant John Davie (d.1710), whose arms are also shown on the front parapet. Robert's first wife was Mary Lethbridge (d.1709), daughter of Christopher Lethbridge (d.1713) of Westaway House, Pilton, (whose "big and sumptuous" mural monument survives in Pilton Church,) whose arms are also shown on the front (south) parapet.

=== Financing ===
It was financed by the Corporation of Barnstaple, as the surviving contemporary inscribed brass tablet beneath the sculpted arms of that corporation records:

"Haec porticus corporis politici de Barum sumptibus restaurata est. Opus tam decorum & utile munificentia promoverunt idemq(ue) suis insigniis ornarunt viri ipsi ornatissimi & honorabiles" ("This colonnade was re-erected by the expense of the body politic (i.e. corporation) of Barnstaple. By their munificence men themselves honourable and most illustrious promoted this work so decorous and useful and decorated the same with their insignia")

Queen Anne's walk side profile

== Queen Anne's statue ==
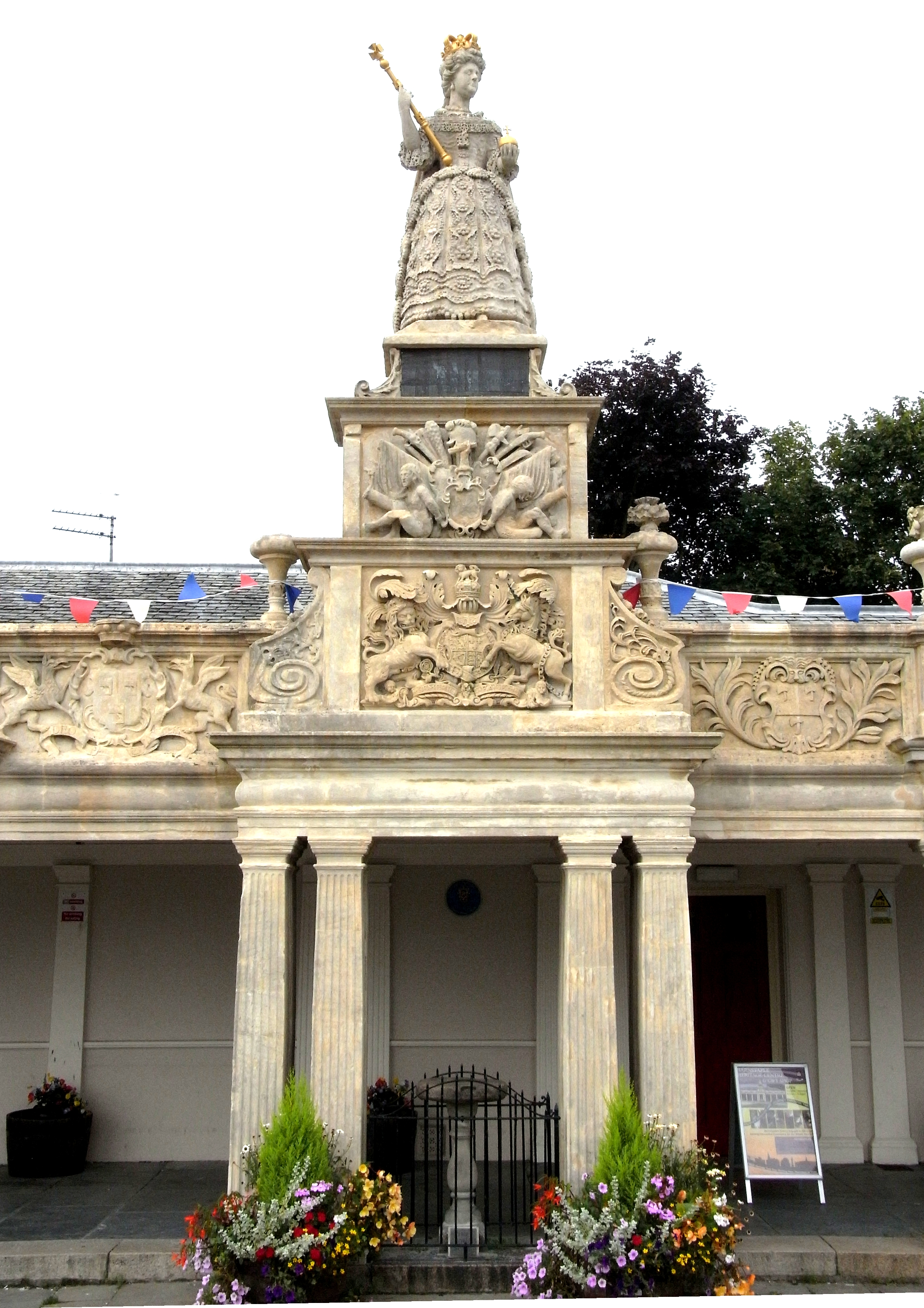
Statue of Queen Anne given by Robert Rolle in 1708 to the Corporation of Barnstaple. Queen Anne's Walk, Barnstaple. The Tome Stone is visible under the colonnade within iron railings

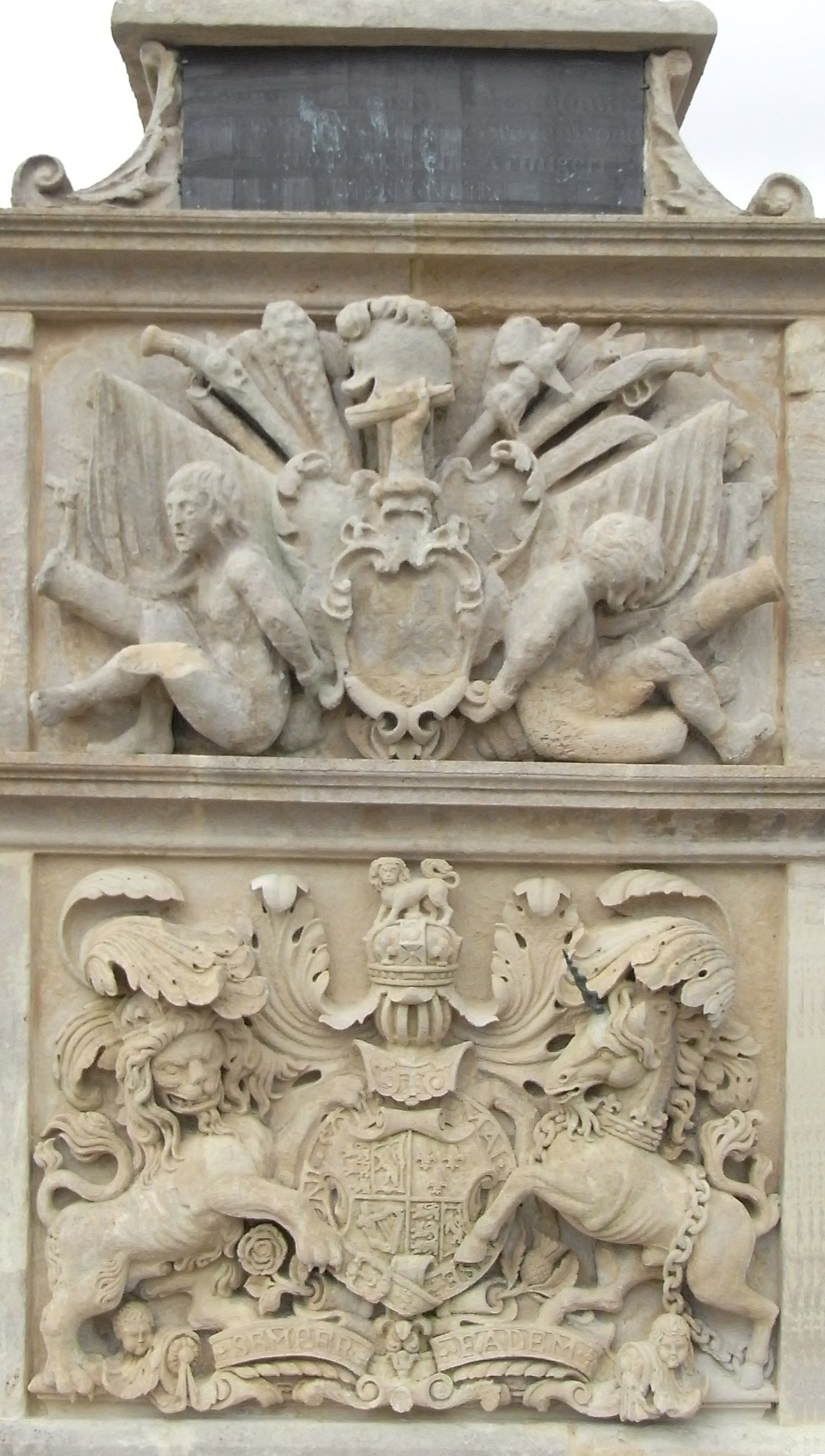
Detail of central panel below statue of Queen Anne. Top, black tablet with inscription "Anna, Intemeratae fidei testimonium Roberti Rolle de Stephenstone in agro Devoniensi Armigeri MDCCVIII"; centre, arms (very worn) and crest (A cubit arm grasping a roll of parchment) of Robert Rolle; bottom, royal arms of Queen Anne

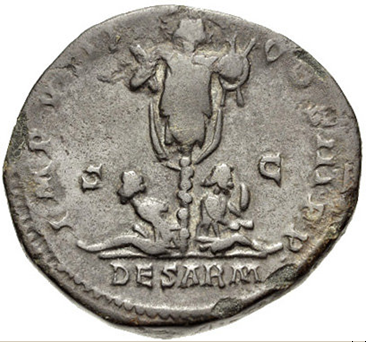
Reverse of Roman coin struck c. AD 177 showing bound Sarmatian captives seated adorsed either side of a tropaion. A well-known and commonly used image from the ancient world which inspired the sculpture on the base of Rolle's statue of Queen Anne, on which the Roman tropaion is replaced by the Rolle cartouche and crest

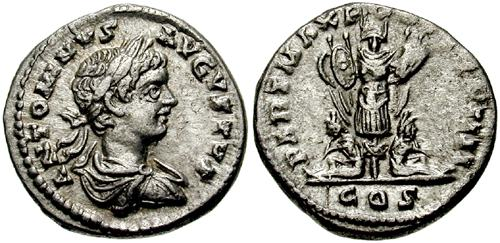
Roman coin of the Emperor Caracalla struck 201 AD, showing similar imagery

In 1708 Robert Rolle (c. 1677–1710) of Stevenstone, near Great Torrington in Devon, donated to the Corporation of Barnstaple, Devon, a large stone statue of Queen Anne, the victorious monarch of the recent Battle of Blenheim in 1704. He was a Tory MP for Callington (twice in 1701) (a pocket borough of the Rolle family) and for Devon (1702–1710). Underneath the statue, possibly intended to be free-standing and not on top of this building, is its original base, now seated somewhat incongruously above the Royal Arms. On the base is an escutcheon showing a cartouche with the arms of Rolle (Or, on a fesse dancetté between three billets azure each charged with a lion rampant of the first three bezants), now much worn, above which is the Rolle crest: A cubit arm erect vested or charged with a fess indented cotised azure in the hand a roll of parchment. On either side of the Rolle arms is a seated naked, disheveled and shackled French prisoner of war, behind whom is a centrally placed antique trophy of arms consisting of captured French weapons (two canon, muskets, a club, a halberd and a helmet etc.) and two lowered French standards on either side. The imagery is reminiscent of the sculptures of two French captives atop the central pediment of Blenheim Palace, built for the Duke of Marlborough, the victorious English commander at that battle. The original source for both is imagery from the classical world, as visible for example on Roman coins. On each side of the base of the statue of Queen Anne is an escutcheon showing the arms of Rolle impaling Duke, the arms of his wife. Immediately below the feet of the Queen is a tablet on which is inscribed the following Latin text:

"Anna, Intemeratae fidei testimonium Roberti Rolle de Stephenstone in agro Devoniensi Armigeri MDCCVIII" ("Anne, a testament of the undefiled faith of Robert Rolle, Esquire, of Stevenstone in the land of Devonshire, 1708")

The inscription was transcribed by the Devon topographer Rev. John Swete (d. 1821) in his "Journals". On the sides of the base of the statue are identical heraldic escutcheons showing the arms of Robert Rolle impaling the arms of Duke, Per fesse argent and azure, three chaplets counterchanged, for his wife Elizabeth Duke (d. 1716), daughter of Richard Duke (1652–1733), MP, of Otterton, Devon.

== Chronology ==
The building was first mentioned in 1609 when a walking place for merchants was erected on the quay. It was then known as the Mercantile Exchange or Merchants' Walk. In about 1708, the present colonnade known as "Queen Anne's Walk" was constructed. In 1859-60 baths were built at which time according to Blaylock (1986), the whole structure was dismantled and the facade rebuilt integrally with the whole. There were six "private baths for ladies and gentlemen" and a "wash house for the poor". In 1866 the "small quay" nearby was filled in following complaints about the "stink from the mud", and on the site was later built the surviving Strand bus station, in the style of Queen Anne's Walk.

In 1868 it was converted to a Masonic Hall. In 1872 the North Devon railway was extended northwards to Ilfracombe and southwards to Torrington, and the new "town station" at Barnstaple destroyed the old harbour area in front of Queen Anne's Walk, following which replacement quays were built at Castle Quay. Repairs were carried out in 1985 when a survey and detailed drawings of the building were made by Blaylock. Further repairs were undertaken in 1912 and 1923. It was re-roofed in 1981. In 1986 a survey was made by Exeter Museums Archaeological Field Unit.

== Armorials ==
Chart showing familial or marriage relationships between nine of the persons (highlighted in yellow) represented by their armorials sculpted in stone on the parapet of Queen Anne's Walk

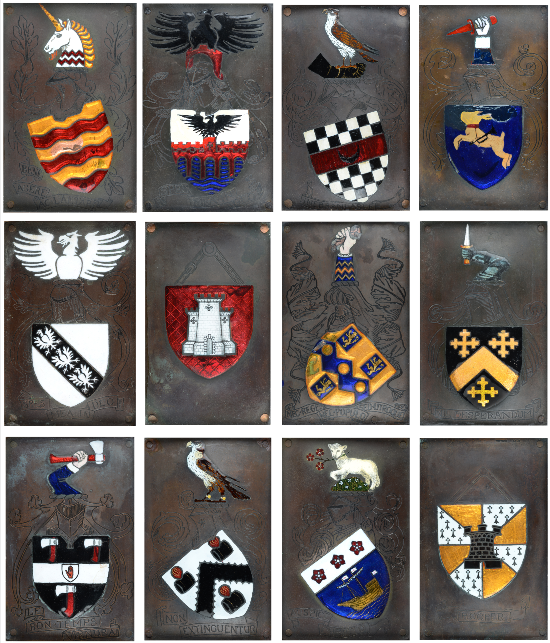
12 heraldic enamelled brasses made in 1913 by May Hart Partridge (c.1881-1917), based on arms displayed on Queen Anne's Walk

The armorial bearings on the structure are illustrated and described in Blaylock's 1985 survey. As the contemporary brass tablet affixed to the east parapet suggests, they represent the members of the Corporation of Barnstaple, viri ipsi ornatissimi & honorabiles, "men themselves honourable and most illustrious", who financed the building work. Nine of them are members of a tightly knit group closely related by blood or marriage, namely: Acland, Hooper, Basset, Davie, Clevland, Chichester, both Incledons and Lethbridge (see pedigree chart illustration). In 1913 the arms shown on the entablature were repeated on twelve small escutcheons and crests in coloured enamels on small decorative brass plates stamped "PARTRIDGE 1913" made by May Hart Partridge (born c.1881 in Harborne, Staffordshire – died 1917), an art enameller who studied at the Birmingham School of Art. She was "the most notorious pupil of Arthur Gaskin". Her works are mainly in the Arts and Crafts style. She later worked at London County Council schools and at home.

May Hart Partridge was the wife of Frederick James Partridge (c.1877–1946), born in Barnstaple, a jeweller, silversmith and teacher of jewellery making. These are now displayed in individual glazed wooden frames affixed to the walls of the staircase of the Barnstaple Guildhall, six on each side. The families so represented are, in order of escutcheons on parapet from west to east (left to right when looking at main front):

Sculpted escutcheon	Arms with tinctures	Full view
Paige: Argent, on a bend sable three eaglets displayed or. These are the arms of a descendant of the Barnstaple merchant Gilbert II Paige (1621–1669) (the son of Gilbert I Paige (c.1590–1647) of Rookabeare House, Fremington, merchant, twice Mayor of Barnstaple), which survive on the mural monument of Gilbert II Paige and on that of his father-in-law Walter Tucker (d.1653), Mayor of Barnstaple, both in St Peter's Church, Barnstaple. Elizabeth Horwood ("Mrs Paige", sister of Thomas Horwood, Mayor of Barnstaple and founder of Horwood's Almshouses, whose widow Alice Horwood founded the free-school in Church Lane), a sister-in-law of Gilbert I Paige, left funds to establish "Paige's Almhouses", the buildings of which survive in Church Lane, and after the family is named the present "Paige's Lane", which may have led from the Paige residence in Crock Street (now Cross Street). One of only four of the escutcheons which are given special prominence, being raised above the parapet and shown super-imposed on an antique trophy of arms with a helm supported on a fasces, the ancient Roman attribute of the magistrate (the other three being the arms of Robert Incledon, John Basset and the Borough of Barnstaple).
Lethbridge: Argent, over water proper a bridge of five arches embattled gules (and over the centre arch a turret) in chief an eagle displayed sable (charged on the breast with a bezant). Arms of Christopher Lethbridge (d.1713) of Westaway in the parish of Pilton, whose "big and sumptuous" mural monument survives in Pilton Church. He was the father-in-law of Robert Incledon, who supervised the building of the structure. Christopher's uncle was Christopher Lethbridge (died 1670) of Exeter in Devon, Mayor of Exeter in 1660, and one of the Worthies of Devon of the biographer John Prince, (1643–1723). His descendant Sir John Lethbridge, 1st Baronet (1746–1815) moved to Sandhill Park in Somerset. The arms of the Lethbridge baronets, which family survives today, show the additional bracketed charges. Westaway was sold in 1819 to James Whyte of Pilton House.
Crossing:(?) A chevron between three cross crosslets (unknown). Apparently Crossing of Exeter, given similarly by Vivian as Or, on a chevron azure between three crosses crosslet fitchée gules as many bezants which family was heir to the Dodderidge family of Barnstaple and of Bremridge, South Molton. Hugh Crossing was Mayor of Exeter in the 17th century and his eldest son Francis Crossing (c.1598-1638) was Member of Parliament for Mitchell in 1626 and for Camelford in 1628.
Clevland: Azure, a hare salient or collared gules pendent therefrom a bugle horn stringed sable. Arms of William Clevland (1664–1734) of Tapeley Park, Westleigh, near Bideford, another son-in-law of John Davie. He was a Scottish-born Royal Navy commander who served as Controller of Storekeepers' Accounts (1718–1732). In 1702, having sailed into the North Devon port of Bideford, then one of the leading tobacco importation ports of Great Britain, he is said to have viewed from his ship the ancient mansion of Tapeley, in the parish of Westleigh, situated on an eminence overlooking the estuary of the River Torridge, and to have been so impressed by the beauty of its position that in 1704 he purchased the estate from the Giffard family of Brightley, which thenceforth he made his residence. His son purchased the lordship of the manor of Bideford, which thenceforward descended with the Tapeley estate, which is still owned and occupied by his descendants (via two female lines) the Christie family, also of Glyndebourne House, East Sussex.
Acland: Chequy argent and sable, a fesse gules. Acland, for Richard II Acland (1679–1729), of Fremington House, lord of the manor of Fremington, near Barnstaple, MP for Barnstaple 1708–13. His arms show a crescent for difference. This is a junior branch of the Acland family which originated before 1155 at the estate of Acland in the parish of Landkey, near Barnstaple. The senior line, which became the Acland baronets of Killerton House, was by the 19th century one of the wealthiest families in Devon, and survives today.
Granville: Gules, three clarions or. For George Granville, 1st Baron Lansdowne of Bideford (1666–1735), nephew of John Granville, 1st Earl of Bath (1628–1701) and heir male of William Henry Granville, 3rd Earl of Bath (1692–1711). It is the only escutcheon with heraldic supporters, generally reserved for use by nobility, here Two winged griffins rampant or. Above the escutcheon is a baron's coronet. He is identifiable by the style of his coronet and by his motto, shown inscribed on a scroll below: Deo, Patriae, Amicis ("For God, my Country and Friends"), the motto of his uncle John Granville, 1st Earl of Bath having been: Futurum invisibile ("The future is unseen"). The arms are not those of John Granville, 1st Earl of Bath (1628–1701), or of his son Charles Granville, 2nd Earl of Bath (1661–1701). The latter's son William Granville, 3rd Earl of Bath (1692–1711) died aged only 19 two years before the building was completed in 1713.
Wrey: Sable, a fesse between three pole-axes argent helved gules. For Sir Bourchier Wrey, 5th Baronet (c. 1683–1726) of Tawstock Court, about 2 miles downstream of Barnstaple on the River Taw. A Cornish family which married the heiress of the Bourchier Earls of Bath, seated at Tawstock Court, heirs of the ancient feudal barons of Barnstaple. Today the Wrey baronets retain ownership of the estate of Tawstock, having sold Tawstock Court.
Davie: A ship with two masts or the sails trussed up and twisted to the masts argent adorned with flags charged with the cross of England on a chief of the second three cinquefoils pierced gules. For the prominent tobacco merchant John I Davie (d.1710) of Orleigh Court, Buckland Brewer and Colonial House (now the Royal Hotel), East-the-Water, Bideford, two of whose sons-in-law are also represented by their arms, namely William Clevland and Henry Incledon. His great-great-grandson Joseph Davie (1764–1846) of Orleigh inherited all the Basset and Hooper estates and changed his name to Basset, adopted the Basset arms and built Watermouth Castle.
Incledon: Argent, a chevron engrailed between three tuns sable fire issuing from the bung hole proper (canting arms from Latin incend(ere), "to kindle, set fire to, burn", hence incendiary, etc., + tun). For Henry Incledon (1671–1736) of Buckland House, Braunton, a son-in-law of John Davie, and elder brother of Robert Incledon (1676–1758), the latter who as Mayor of Barnstaple supervised the construction of the building and whose arms are shown on the east side of the parapet. Their mother was a granddaughter of Francis Fane, 1st Earl of Westmorland (1580–1629) and a niece of Rachel Fane, wife of Henry Bourchier, 5th Earl of Bath (1587–1654), of Tawstock Court, the leading Royalist in Devon during the Civil War. The ancient building known as the "Three Tuns" survives on the west side of the High Street. The family was one of the oldest in Devon, first recorded in 1160 as resident at the manor of Incledon, in the parish of Braunton, still owned today, with Buckland, by their descendant via various female lines.
Hooper: Gyronny of eight or and ermine, a tower triple towered sable. For Sir Nicholas I Hooper (1654–1731) of Fulbrooke, Braunton, Serjeant-at-Law, MP for Barnstaple 1695–1715, who purchased nearby Raleigh House, Pilton (now the site of the Barnstaple Hospital), from his fellow MP Arthur Champneys in 1703. Richard Hooper was Mayor of Barnstaple in 1660 and 1674. He was buried at Barnstaple, with "his magnificent funeral attracting some caustic comment". The son of Sir Nicholas I Hooper was Nicholas II Hooper who rebuilt Raleigh House on an adjacent site slightly higher up the hill, which building survives today. Nicholas II Hooper's heir was his sister Elizabeth Hooper (d.1726), who in 1713 married John Bassett (1683–1721), of Heanton Punchardon, MP for Barnstaple 1718–1721. She survived her husband and remarried to Rev. Thomas Morrison, and was buried at Bath Abbey. Her descendant Rev. Hooper Morrison in 1769 purchased Yeo Vale, Alwington and married Charlotte Orchard (d.1791), whose monument survives in the Yeo Vale Aisle of Alwington Church, sister and in her issue heiress of Paul II Orchard (1739–1812) of Hartland Abbey. Rev. Thomas Hooper Morrison (1767–1824) was the owner of Yeo Vale, Alwington in 1810 and of Hartland Abbey. These arms are shown in enamel with tinctures on the staircase of Barnstaple Guildhall, with the name "Hooper" inscribed on the frame. These gyronny arms, with variant tinctures, were also borne by Howper of Musbury, Devon; by George Hooper (1640–1727), of Grimley, Worcestershire, Bishop of Bath and Wells; by Hooper of Hendford, Yeovil, Somerset; by Hopper of Shincliffe, Durham; by Hopper of Witton Castle, County Durham.
Basset: Barry wavy of six or and gules, for John Basset (d.1721) of Umberleigh and of Heanton Court, Heanton Punchardon, situated on the shoreline of the River Taw below Barnstaple. He was MP for Barnstaple 1718–1721 in which seat he was successor-but-one to Sir Nicholas Hooper (whose arms also appear on Queen Anne's Walk), whose daughter and ultimate sole-heiress Elizabeth Hooper he married. His mother was Elizabeth Acland, first cousin of Richard Acland (1679–1729), of Fremington House, MP for Barnstaple 1708–13, whose arms also appear on Queen Anne's Walk. His granddaughter Eleanor Basset (1741–1800) was the last of the ancient Basset family of North Devon, and married her step-first cousin John III Davie (d.1793) of Orleigh, great-grandson and eventual heir of the merchant John I Davie (d.1710) (whose arms also appear). Their son Joseph Davie (1764–1846) of Orleigh inherited all the Basset estates and changed his name to Basset, adopted the Basset arms and built Watermouth Castle. The arms are raised above the parapet at the far east (right) corner of the south front.
Chichester: Chequy or and gules, a chief vair, for Sir Arthur Chichester, 3rd Baronet (d.1718), of Youlston Park, Shirwell, thrice MP for Barnstaple (1685–87, 1689–90, 1713-18), who in 1689 sold his family's ancient seat of Raleigh, Pilton, close to Barnstaple, to Arthur Champneys who succeeded him as MP, and built Youlston Park. The owners of the estate of Raleigh exerted much control over the electorate of Barnstaple. The family was in the 17th century lord of the manor of Barnstaple Castle (or "Castle Court"). His daughter Susanna Chichester was the second wife of Henry Incledon. The Chichester baronets survive today but have lost any connection with North Devon. A living descendant of this branch of the family is Giles Chichester (born 1946) a former Conservative Party Member of the European Parliament for South West England and Gibraltar, son of the famous yachtsman Sir Francis Chichester, a grandson of the 8th baronet.

contemporary

- Gules a Castle of three towers conjoined Argent the centre tower larger than the others. Barnstaple Borough. Raised above parapet on south corner of east parapet. Inscribed brass tablet below.
- Argent, a chevron engrailed between three tuns sable fire issuing from the bung hole proper. Incledon, for Robert Incledon (1676–1758), Mayor of Barnstaple 1712–13, who supervised the construction. Escutcheon raised above parapet at north (left) corner of east side. Inscribed brass tablet below. The arms of his elder brother Henry Incledon (1671–1736) of Buckland House, Braunton, are shown on the south side of the parapet. The ancient building known as the "Three Tuns" survives on the west side of the high Street.

== Sources ==
- Heritage Gateway, Devon & Dartmoor, MDV841: Queen Anne's Walk, Barnstaple
- Pevsner, Nikolaus & Cherry, Bridget, The Buildings of England: Devon, London, 2004, p. 153
- Blaylock, S. R., 1986, Queen Anne's Walk, Barnstaple (Report & Survey)
- Gribble, Joseph Besly, Memorials of Barnstaple: Being an Attempt to Supply the Want of A History of that Ancient Borough, Barnstaple, 1830, pp.560-1 (Gribble established the “Barnstaple Iron Foundry” in 1822 (p. 546))
