= William Clevland =

William Clevland may refer to:

- William Clevland (1664–1734), Royal Navy commander
- William Clevland (king) (died 1758), his son, self-appointed king of the Banana Islands

== See also ==
- William Cleveland (born 1965), American swimmer
- William S. Cleveland (born 1943), American computer scientist
- Bill Cleveland (1902–1974), Louisiana politician
