= Tilka Majhi =

Tribal freedom fighter

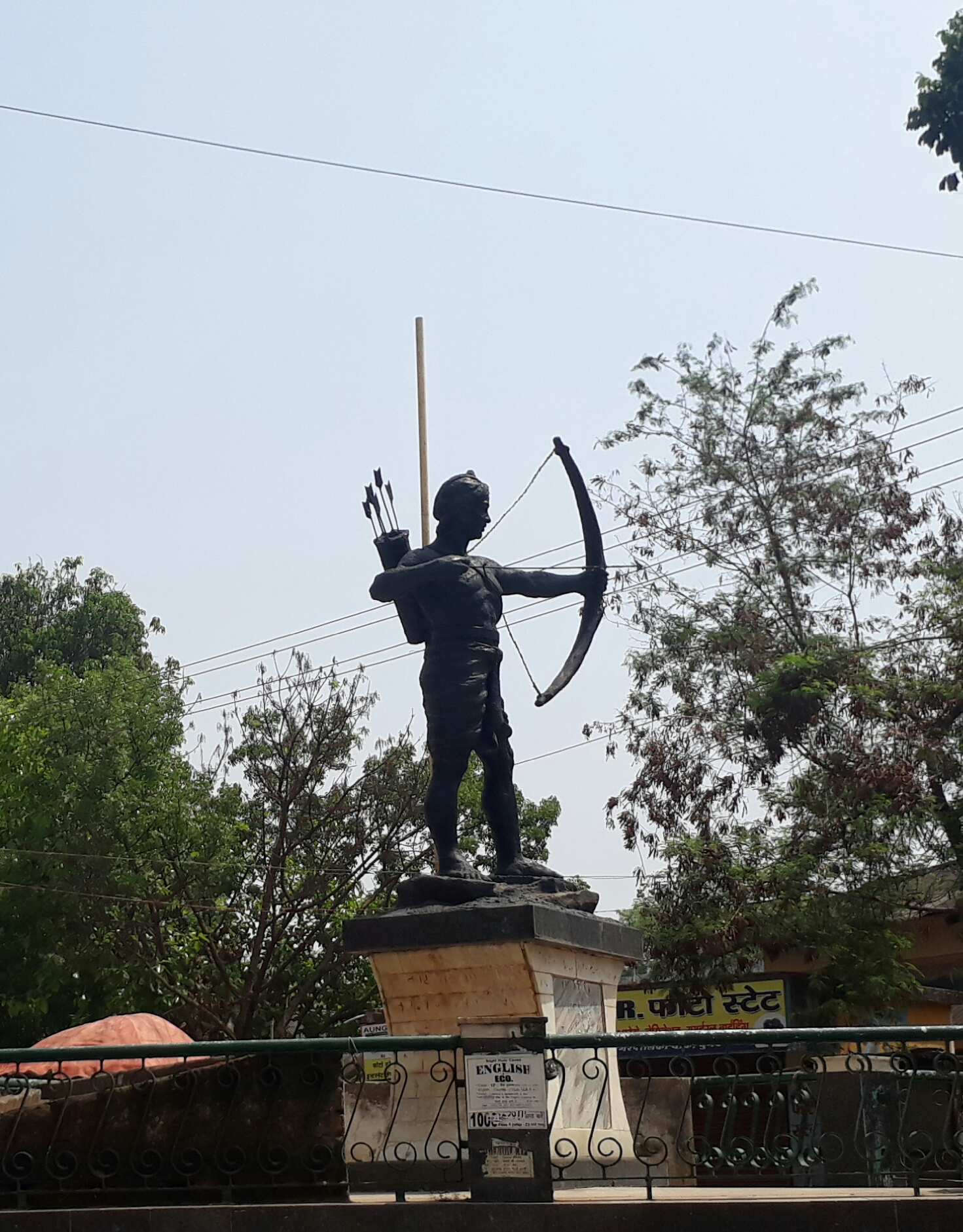
- Statue of Tilka Majhi, Dumka, Jharkhand
- Born: 11 February 1750; Tilakpur, Sultanganj, Bengal Subah, (now in Bihar, India)
- Died: 13 January 1785; Bhagalpur, Bengal Presidency, British India (now in Bihar, India)
- Cause of death: Execution by hanging
- Occupations: Tribal chief; revolutionary
- Movement: Manjhi revolt, tribal resistance against British colonial rule

Tilka Majhi (11 February 1750 – 13 January 1785), according to popular accounts, was an Indian tribal leader who led a rebellion against British colonial rule from 1771 until his capture and execution in 1785. In these narratives, he is described as one of the earliest freedom fighters who organised local residents against the administration of the East India Company and is said to have assassinated Augustus Cleveland with a poison arrow, although contemporary records suggest otherwise.

According to historian Dinesh Narayan Verma, government records up to 1965 and early post-independence writings on tribal history, make no mention of a tribal leader named 'Tilka Manjhi' or of his role in the death of Augustus Cleveland. Verma further notes that the first appearance of the figure 'Tilka Manjhi' came in 1970, in a book by Ramlakhan Prasad Gond, an engineer by profession, and concludes that Tilka Manjhi "emerged as a historical personality without [a] single historical evidence."

Since the 1970s, Tilka Manjhi has been featured in various literary works such as Mahasweta Devi's book Shaalgirah Ki Pukar Par. Subsequently, several streets, places, and institutions have been named after him as symbols of tribal nationalism.

== Popular biography ==
According to collective memory, Tilka Manjhi was born in Tilakpur village of Sultanganj, Bengal Subah (present-day Bihar), traditionally identified as Santal, though some sources suggest otherwise. (Note: Historians are not sure whether Majhi was a Pahadia or a Santhal tribal but he is known as 'Jabra Pahadia' as this is how he is mentioned in the British records of that time.) He had acquired the skills of archery, hunting wild animals, fording rivers, and climbing high trees in his childhood. His name, Tilka, means "person with angry red eyes" in Pahadia language was given due to his fierce nature. As a village head, he adopted the title "Manjhi," which signifies a leader in both Pahadia and Santal communities. Manjhi played a crucial role for worship and leading the Santal community. He was revered as Majhi Baba. His father name was Sundara Murmu. Tilka Manjhi took up arms against the British in 1784, predating the Indian Rebellion of 1857 by more than half a century. He organised the adivasis predominantly Santal to form an armed group to fight against the resource grabbing and exploitation of British.

In 1784, the first armed rebellion occurred against the British, and was the beginning of the Santal revolt. It was due to a famine in 1770 and the consequences of the Court of Directors order influenced by William Pitt the Younger—the Court of Directors issued a ten-year order on the settlement of zamindari. This resulted in a minimal chance to negotiate between local zamdindars and Santal villagers. Majhi attacked Augustus Cleveland, the British commissioner lieutenant, and Rajmahal with a gulel (similar to a slingshot). The British surrounded the Tilapore forest from which he operated, although he and his men held them at bay for several weeks. When he was finally caught in 1784, he was tied to the tail of a horse and dragged to the collector's residence at Bhagalpur. There, his lacerated body was hung from a Banyan tree.

== Death of Cleveland ==
Augustus Cleveland was born in North Devon, England to John Clevland. He joined the service of the Company at the age of 17, partly because of his connection to Sir John Shore. At the young age of 25, Cleveland became the Magistrate and Collector of Bhagalpur and Rajmahal in 1779. Cleveland died on 13 January 1784 at the age of 29 after a month of fever. He died aboard the ship Atlas Indiaman near the mouth of the Hooghly River while sailing to the Cape of Good Hope, and his body was taken back to Calcutta on a pilot boat and buried in South Park Street Cemetery.

== Connection with Jabra Pahadia ==
Popular accounts suggest that Tilka Manjhi's real name was Jabra Pahadia. However, Verma argues that this was an attempt to equate Tilka Manjhi with a historical figure. According to him, Jabra Pahadia (Note: His name is spelled variously in the sources such as Joura, Jaura, Jaurah, Jabra, Jowra, or Jawra Paharia.) was a historical figure who was 'once a noted bandit' but later served in the British administration around the same period. And, Verma continues, contemporary records do not support the identification of the two figures as the same.

== Legacy ==
After the Independence of India, a statue of Manjhi was erected at the place of his execution in Bhagalpur town in 1984–85, which is now popularly known as Tilka Manjhi Chowk. The nearby residence of S.P. Bhagalpur was named after him. In 1991, Bhagalpur University was renamed to Tilka Manjhi Bhagalpur University, amid growing demands for a separate Jharkhand state.
