= Claudius Amyand =

Claudius Amyand may refer to:

- Claudius Amyand (surgeon) (c. 1660–1740), Huguenot surgeon
- Claudius Amyand (MP) (1718–1774), MP for Tregony and Sandwich, son of above
