= Richard Acland (1679–1729) =

18th-century English politician

Member of Parliament for Barnstaple
- In office 1708-1713

Personal details
- Born: 1679 England
- Died: 1729 (aged 49–50)
- Spouse: Susanna Lovering (m. 1700)
- Children: 2+
- Occupation: Politician

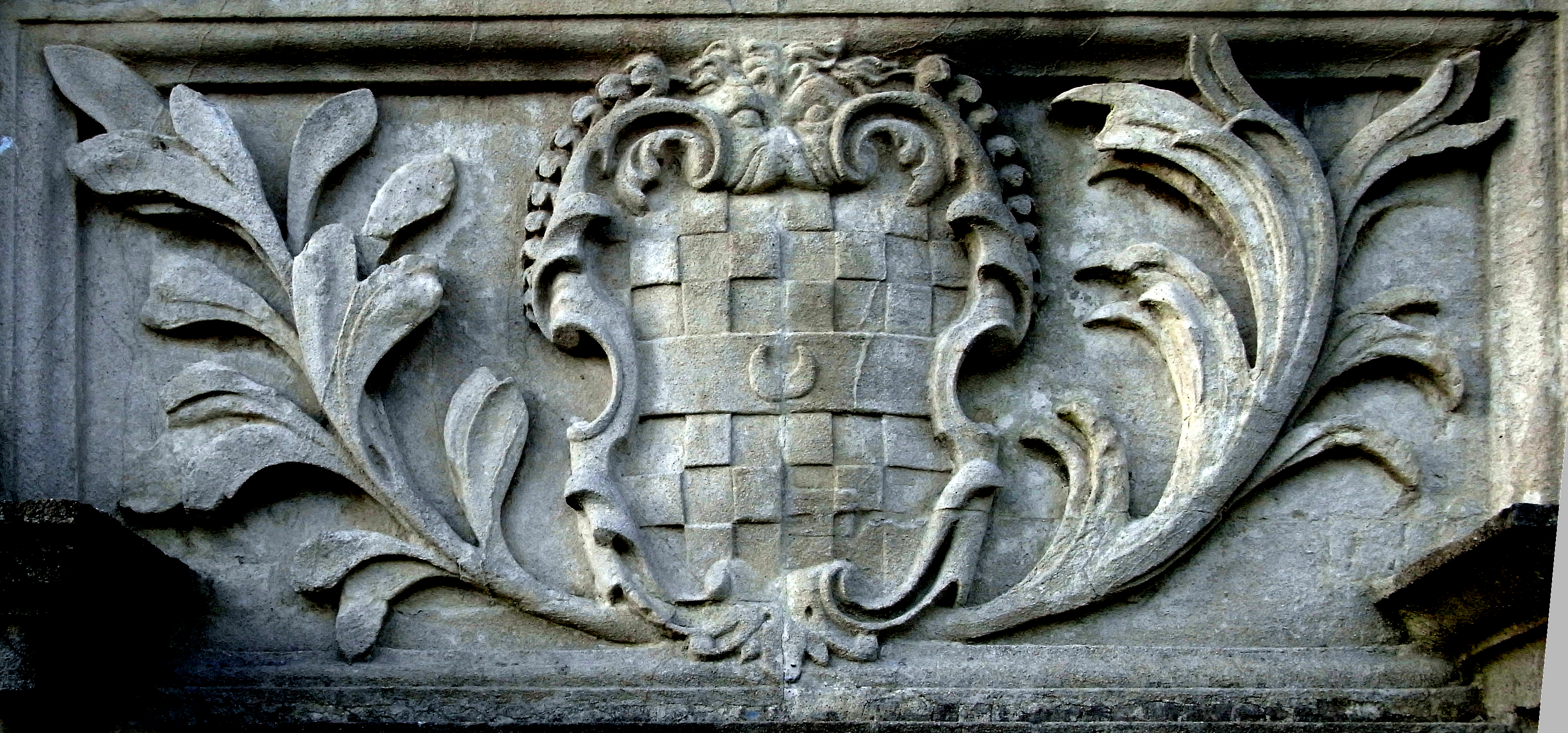
Arms of Richard Acland on parapet of Queen Anne's Walk, Barnstaple

Richard Acland (1679–1729), lord of the Manor of Fremington, near Barnstaple in North Devon, was a Member of Parliament for Barnstaple 1708–13.

== Biography ==
Following his marriage in 1700 to a wealthy heiress he built the large and grand Queen Anne style mansion house known as Fremington House. His arms are displayed on the parapet of Queen Anne's Walk in Barnstaple, as one of about twelve such arms representing members of the Corporation of Barnstaple who financed the building, completed in 1713.

He was the son of Richard Acland (died 1703), a merchant of Barnstaple, who purchased the manor of Fremington in 1683. His uncle was Arthur Acland (1616–91), of Bittadon, a Member of Parliament for Barnstaple 1679–80.

In 1700 he married Susanna Lovering (died 1747), the younger of the two daughters and co-heiresses of John Lovering (died 1686), a wealthy merchant. He left children including John Acland, listed as a freeholder in Fremington in 1733, and Susanna Acland, heiress of Fremington, who in 1748 married William Barbor (1723-1800), son and heir of William Barbor, an eminent physician.

== Sources ==
- History of Parliament biography of Richard Acland of Fremington
