= Southcott, North Devon =

Coordinates: 51.0271°N 4.1836°W

Southcott
- Hamlet
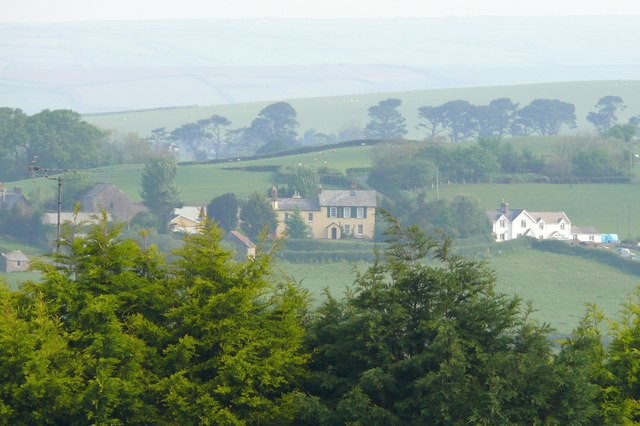
- Southcott Barton

- Location within Devon
- Civil parish: Westleigh
- District: North Devon
- Ceremonial county: Devon
- Region: South West
- Country: England
- Sovereign state: United Kingdom
- Post town: Bideford

Southcott is a hamlet east of Bideford in the parish of Westleigh in the district of North Devon, in the county of Devon, England.

The hamlet consists of Southcott Barton to the West and Southcott Cottages to the East. Southcott is bordered by the A39 and the River Torridge.

Southcott House, located in Southcott Barton, is a 17th-century listed farmhouse.
