= Clevelandia =

Clevelandia may refer to:

- Clevelândia, a municipality in Brazil
- Clevelândia do Norte, a village in Amapá, Brazil
- Clevelandia beldingii, a plant in the broomrape family Orobanchaceae
- Clevelandia ios, a fish in the family Gobiidae
