= Tapeley =

Historic estate in Devon, England

Coordinates: 51.0407°N 4.1728°W

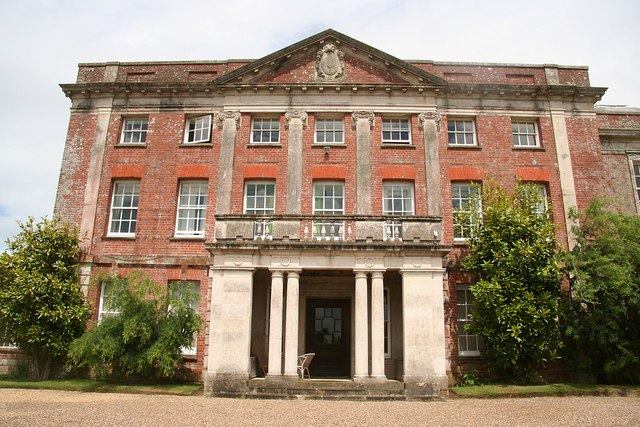
Tapeley Park, south front

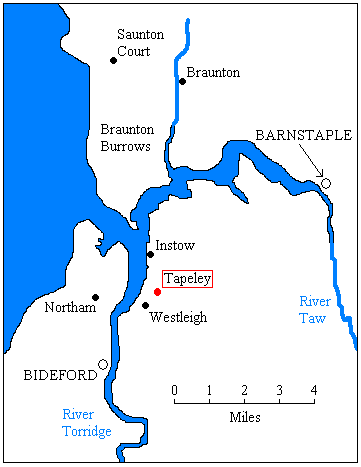
Map showing location of Tapeley Park in North Devon

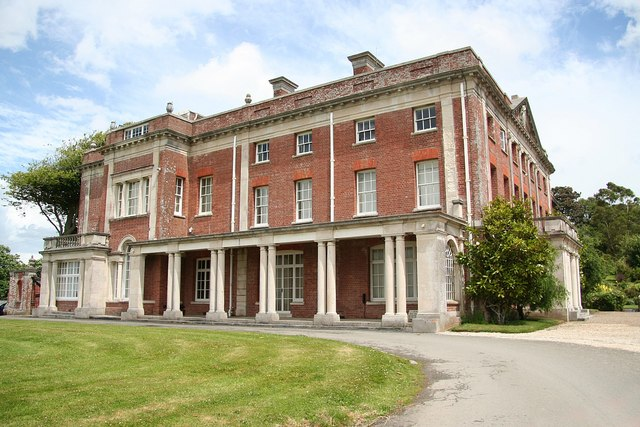
Tapeley Park, west front, viewed from south-west

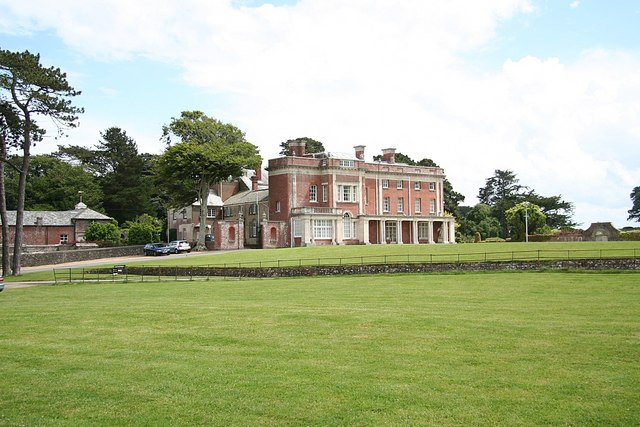
Tapeley Park, west front and north (service) front, viewed from north-west

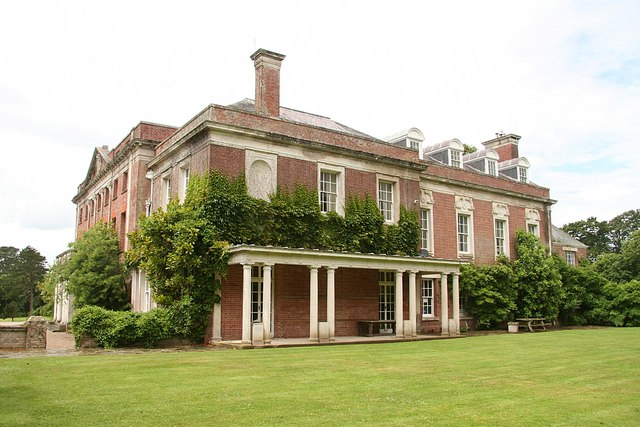
Tapeley Park, east front

Tapeley is a historic estate in the parish of Westleigh in North Devon, England.

The present mansion house known as Tapeley Park is a grade II* listed country house, built or enlarged from an existing structure in about 1704, remodeled in the 19th century and again in the early 20th century when pilasters, portico, pediment and parapet were added to create a Queen Anne style building. In the mid 19th century the estate was inherited from the Clevland family by William Langham Christie of Glyndebourne in Sussex. His grandson was John Christie (born 1882), the founder of Glyndebourne Opera Festival, who bequeathed Tapeley to his daughter Rosamund Christie (1933–1988), who passed it onto her nephew Hector Christie (born 1963), who briefly turned it into a hippie commune. In 2011, Tapeley Park was the subject of an episode of the Channel 4 television programme Country House Rescue, presented by the hotelier Ruth Watson, who advised on restoring the estate to a sound financial position.

The gardens are Grade II* listed in the National Register of Historic Parks and Gardens. They are open to the public on a regular basis and feature Italianate terraces, a working kitchen garden and a permaculture garden. The estate, now mainly owned by the Christie Devon Estates Trust (trustees of the Christie family), comprises about 6,000 acres, and covers Saunton (including foreshore and beach), Braunton Burrows (sand dunes, partly a nature reserve and leased to the Ministry of Defence), Instow (including the foreshore purchased from the crown estate) and the village of Westleigh.

== Descent ==
=== Baudrope ===
The first recorded holder of Tapeley according to Risdon (died 1640) was the family of Baudrope.

=== de Tapelegh ===
According to Pole (died 1635), Tapeley was held by the de Tapelegh family as follows:

- Walter de Tapeley, who is recorded as holding it in 1295
- Walter de Tapeley, 1314
- Robert Tapeley, 1345

=== Grant ===
The heir general of the Tapeley family took Tapeley by marriage into the Grant family. A certain Mauger le Grant was lord of the manor of Westleigh (in which parish is situated Tapeley), which he held from "Lord Hugh Courtenay" (possibly therefore Hugh de Courtenay, 9th Earl of Devon (1276–1340) or his son Hugh de Courtenay, 10th Earl of Devon (1303–1377) or Hugh de Courtenay, 12th Earl of Devon (1389–1422)), and was succeeded by William Grant and then the latter's son William Grant (of Steventon, Devon), whose daughter Elizabeth Grant in 1477 married John Monck of Potheridge in the parish of Merton, Devon, ancestor of George Monck, 1st Duke of Albemarle (died 1670).

=== Coblegh ===
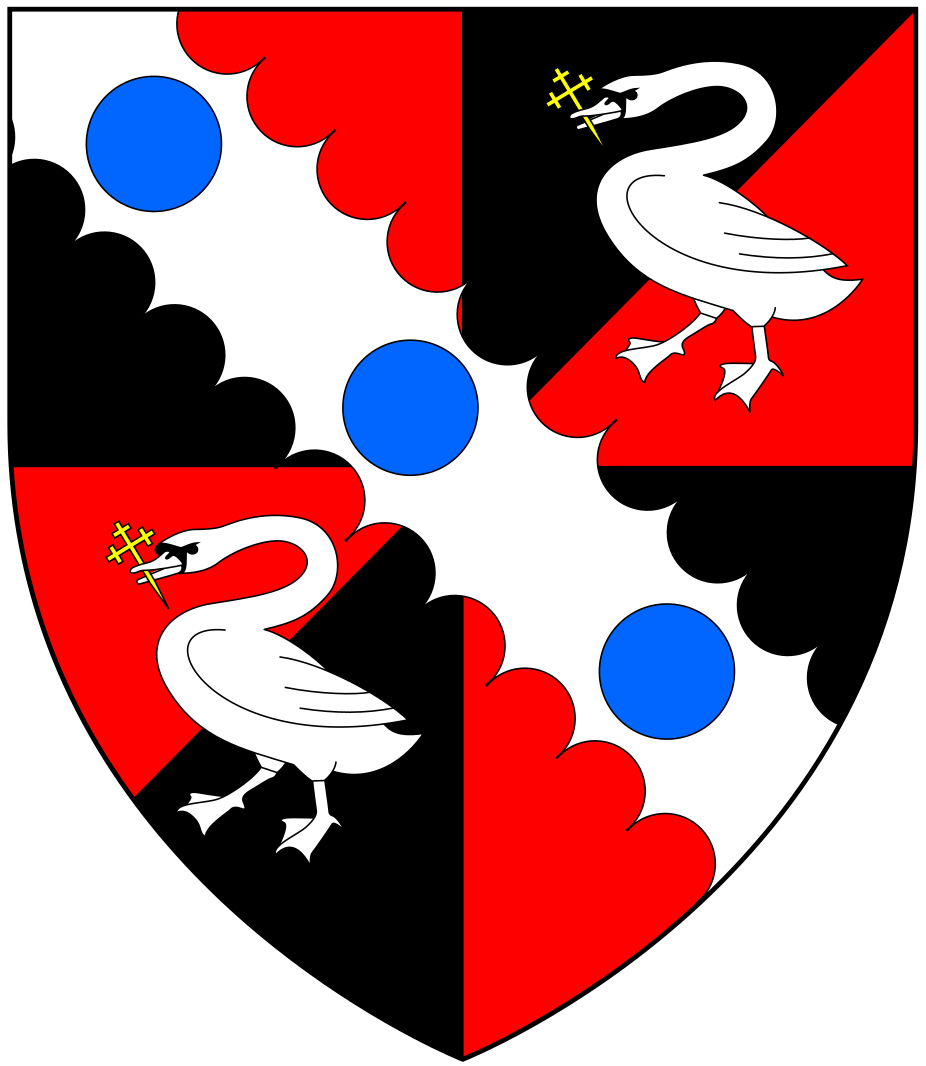
Canting arms of Coblegh family of Brightley: Gyronny of eight gules and sable, between two cobs argent on a bend engrailed of the last three hurts. The cobs (i.e. male swans) are shown each with a cross fitchy in its beak on the mural monument to Roger Giffard (died 1603) of Tiverton Castle in the chancel of Tiverton Church

From Grant the estate of Tapeley descended by unknown means to the family of Coblegh of Brightley, Chittlehampton, Devon. The Coblegh family of Brightley were the leading family resident within the manor and parish of Chittlehampton but were not lords of the manor of Chittlehampton. Two monumental brasses commemorating the Cobley family survive in St Hieritha's Church, Chittlehampton, one with an inscription to Henry Coblegh (died 1470) and his wife Alicia, parents of John Coblegh, whose brass lies adjacent to the north. John married twice, firstly to Isabella Cornu, secondly to Joan Pyne (possibly of the Pyne family of East Down), as his brass records. His son by his second marriage was John Coblegh (died 1542) who married Joan (or Jane) Fortescue, a daughter of William Fortescue (died 1520), 2nd son of John Fortescue, of Wimpstone, Modbury, which John Fortescue was 1st cousin of Sir John Fortescue (c. 1394 – c. 1480), Lord Chief Justice of England and Wales. John Coblegh is recorded in the Lisle Letters as one of the Devonshire notables who were given a deer by Honor Plantagenet, Viscountess Lisle (died 1566) from the park of her nearby manor of Umberleigh. He also features further in the Letters. There exists in Chittlehampton church a slab monument of John Coblegh (died 1542) and his wife Joan Fortescue. Their only child and sole heiress was Margaret Coblegh who married Sir Roger Giffard (died 1547), thus Brightley, together with other estates including Tapeley passed to the Giffard family.

=== Giffard ===
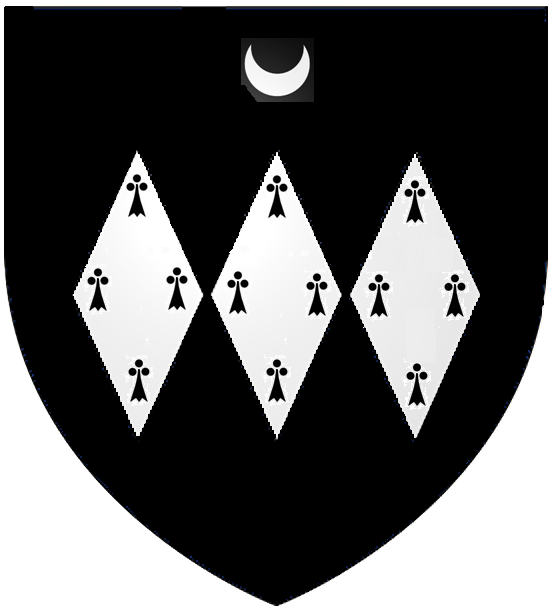
Arms of Giffard: Sable, three fusils conjoined in fesse ermine for difference a crescent in chief argent. The crescent denotes that the family seated at Brightley descended from a second son of an ancient Giffard patriarch

The pedigree of Giffard (pronounced Jiffard) is given as follows in the Heraldic visitations of Devon:

==== Sir Roger Giffard (died 1547) ====
Sir Roger Giffard (died 1547) was a younger son of the Giffard family of Halsbury in the parish of Parkham, 4 miles south-west of Bideford. He was the 3rd son of Thomas Giffard (1532/3) of Halsbury but the eldest by his second wife Anne Coryton, daughter of John Coryton of Newton Ferrers in the parish of St Mellion, in Cornwall. Several monuments exist to the Coryton family in the Church of St Melanus, St Mellion. Thomas's eldest son by his first marriage was heir to Halsbury and the senior line of the family remained seated there until the death of John Giffard of Halsbury (d.post 1666), the last in the male line, who bequeathed the estate on Roger Giffard (1646–1724) a younger son of the junior Brightley line. Sir Roger Giffard had 14 children by his wife Margaret Coblegh, heiress of Brightley and Tapeley.

==== John Giffard (died 1585) ====
John Giffard (died 1585), eldest son and heir of Sir Roger Giffard (died 1547), married Mary Grenville, daughter of Sir Richard Grenville (c. 1495–1550), lord of the manors of Stowe, Kilkhampton in Cornwall and of Bideford, Devon, MP for Cornwall in 1529. Mary was the sister of Roger Grenville, believed to have been the captain of the Mary Rose in the sinking of which at Portsmouth he drowned in 1545, and was thus aunt of his son the heroic sea captain Sir Richard Grenville (1542–1591) of the Revenge. She survived her husband and remarried Arthur Tremayne of Collacombe. His eldest son and heir was John Giffard (died 1622).

==== John Giffard (died 1622) ====
John Giffard (died 1622), son and heir of John Giffard (died 1585), married Honor Earle (died 1638), daughter of Sir Walter Earle of Charborough, Dorset. His eldest son Arthur Giffard (1580–1616) predeceased his father having married Agnes Leigh (died 1625), daughter of Thomas Leigh Esq., of Burrough (anciently "Borow", "Borough", etc.) in the parish of Northam, near Bideford. Arthur left a son and heir to his grandfather, Col. John Giffard (1602–1665), and eight other children including his 2nd son Rev. Arthur Giffard (1605–1666), appointed in 1643 Rector of Bideford by his cousin Sir John Granville (1628–1701) (created Earl of Bath in 1661).

==== Col. John Giffard (1602–1665) ====
Col. John Giffard (1602–1665), grandson of John Giffard (died 1622), was a Colonel of Royalist forces in the Civil War, who married in 1621 Joan Wyndham, daughter of Sir John Wyndham (1558–1645) of Orchard Wyndham, near Williton, Somerset. He had a daughter Grace, whose effigy exists in Chittlehampton Church, and at least two sons, John Giffard (1639–1712), his heir, and Roger Giffard (1644–1724).

==== John Giffard (1639–1712) ====
John Giffard (1639–1712), of Brightley, eldest son and heir of Col. John Giffard (1602–1665). In 1704 he sold the estate of Tapeley to William Clevland (1664–1734). John married twice:

- Firstly to Susannah Bampfylde, 4th daughter of Sir John Bampfylde, 1st Baronet (c. 1610 – 1650), MP, of Poltimore and North Molton. Their son John Giffard (died 1704) married Margaret Clotworthy, daughter of Roger Clotworthy of Rashleigh, Wembworthy. This marriage failed to produce a male heir, only a daughter and heiress Margaret Giffard (died 1743), who married John Courtenay (died 1732), the last in the male line of Courtenay of Molland.
- Secondly to Frances Fane, 2nd daughter of Hon. and Rev. William Fane, a son of Francis Fane, 1st Earl of Westmorland and brother of Lady Rachel Fane (1614–1681), wife of Henry Bourchier, 5th Earl of Bath of Tawstock Court, 5 miles east of Tapeley. By Francis Fane he had at least two sons, Henry Giffard (1675–1709) an officer in the Royal Navy, who married Martha Hill, daughter of Edward Hill, Judge of the Admiralty and Treasurer of Virginia. His brother and John Giffard's 4th son was his heir Caesar Giffard (died 1715) who married Mary Melhuish. They had a daughter Rachel Giffard who married Thomas Colley (died 1762). The executors of the will of Caesar Giffard sold the manor of Chittlehampton in 1737 to Samuel Rolle of Hudscott, within the parish of Chittlehampton.

=== Clevland ===
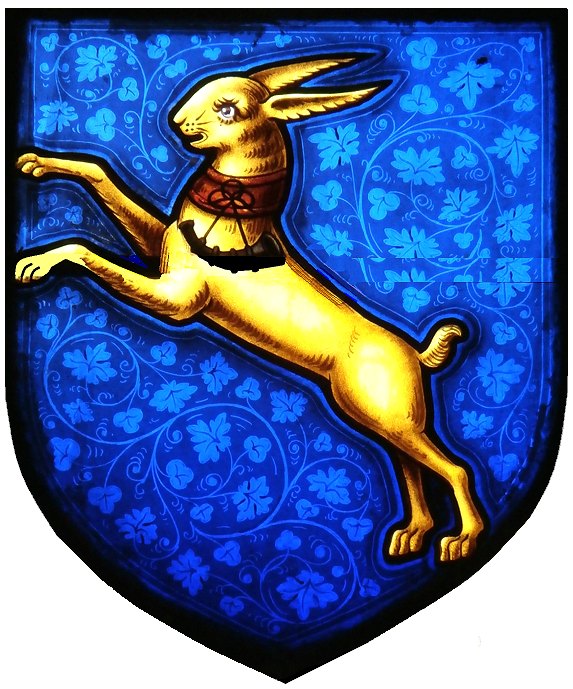
Arms of Clevland of Tapeley: Azure, a hare salient or collared gules pendent therefrom a bugle horn stringed sable. Detail from memorial stained glass window to Archibald Clevland (1833–1854), Westleigh Church

==== William Clevland (1664–1734) ====
Commander William Clevland (1664–1734), (alias Cleuland) was a Scottish-born Royal Navy commander who served as Controller of Storekeepers' Accounts (23 April 1718 – 24 May 1732). In 1702, having sailed into the North Devon port of Bideford, then one of the leading tobacco importation ports of Great Britain, he is said to have viewed from his ship the ancient mansion of Tapeley, in the parish of Westleigh, situated on an eminence overlooking the estuary of the River Torridge, and to have been so impressed by the beauty of its position that in 1704 he purchased the estate from the Giffard family of Brightley, which thenceforth he made his residence. He was the eldest son of Archibald Cleuland (sic) of Knowhoblehill, Lanarkshire, Scotland. The family claimed descent from the ancient Scottish clan of Cleland (alias Cleuland) of Faskine, Lanarkshire, south-east of Glasgow, with which it shares similar armorials. In 1704 he married Ann Davie (1689–1726), a daughter of the prominent Bideford tobacco merchant John Davie (died 1710), of Orleigh Court, Buckland Brewer and Colonial House (now the Royal Hotel), East-the-Water, Bideford. He is said by various sources (but not by Burke's Landed Gentry 1858, which states his two sons named William died young) to have had a younger son William Clevland, said to have become King of the Banana Islands following a shipwreck.

==== John Clevland (1706–1763) ====
John Clevland (1706–1763), eldest son and heir, of Tapeley, was Secretary to the Admiralty 1751–1763 (First Secretary from 1759) and was twice MP for Saltash, Devon (1741–1747 and 1754–1761) and for Sandwich in Kent (1747–1754). In about 1750 he purchased the lordship of the manor of Bideford, which thenceforward descended with the Tapeley estate. He married three times. His 6th son was Augustus Clevland (1754–1784), youngest son by his 3rd wife, an officer of the East India Company who rose to the high position of Collector of Bhagalpur, Bengal. Three paintings of Indian scenes by William Hodges RA were commissioned by Augustus and remained at Tapeley Park until 2025.

==== John Clevland (1734–1817) ====
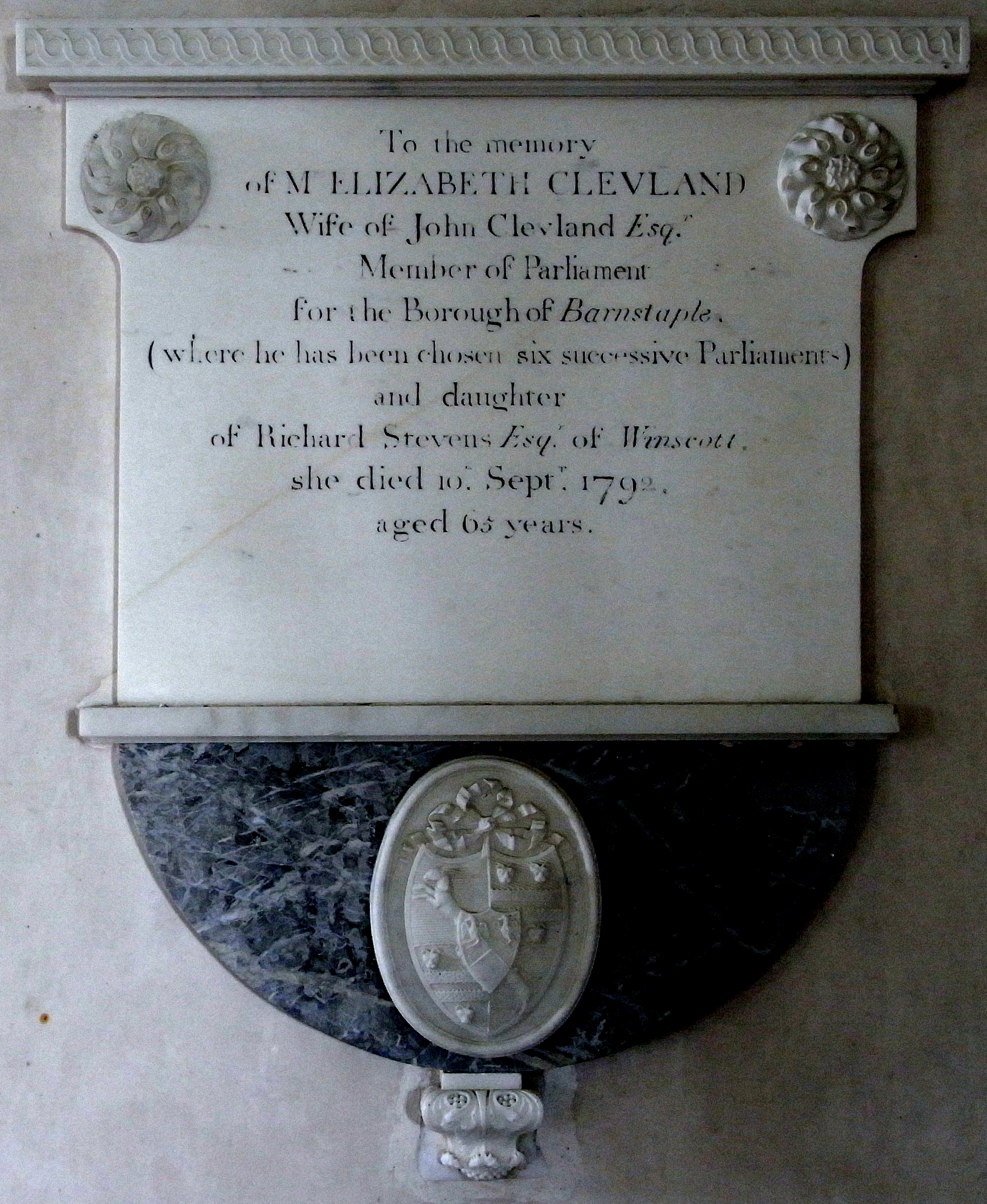
Mural monument to Elizabeth Stevens (1727–1792), wife of John Clevland (1734–1817), Peters Marland Church

John Clevland (1734–1817), of Tapeley, eldest son and heir by his father's first wife, was MP for Barnstaple in seven parliaments and was Director of Greenwich Hospital. He married Elizabeth Stevens (1727–1792), the daughter and heiress of Richard Stevens (1702–1776) of Winscott, in the parish of Peters Marland, Devon, Member of Parliament for Callington in Cornwall (1761–1768). He left no children and was pre-deceased by all five of his younger brothers and half-brothers. A mural monument to his wife survives in Peters Marland Church inscribed as follows:

To the memory of Mrs Elizabeth Clevland wife of John Clevland Esq., Member of Parliament for the Borough of Barnstaple (where he has been chosen six successive parliaments) and daughter of Richard Stevens of Winscott. She died 16 September 1792 aged 65 years.

Below is a white marble relief sculpted escutcheon showing the following arms: Quarterly 1st & 4th: Clevland; 2nd & 3rd: Vert, two bars engrailed between three leopard's faces or (Child baronets, of the City of London (1685) (Child of Surat, East Indies and Dervill, Essex, Baronet, created 1684, extinct 1753), the arms of William Clevland's mother Elizabeth Child). Overall is an inescutcheon of pretence of Stevens: Per chevron azure and gules, in chief two falcons rising belled or.

=== Saltren Willett (Clevland) ===
==== Augustus Saltren-Willett (1781–1849) ====
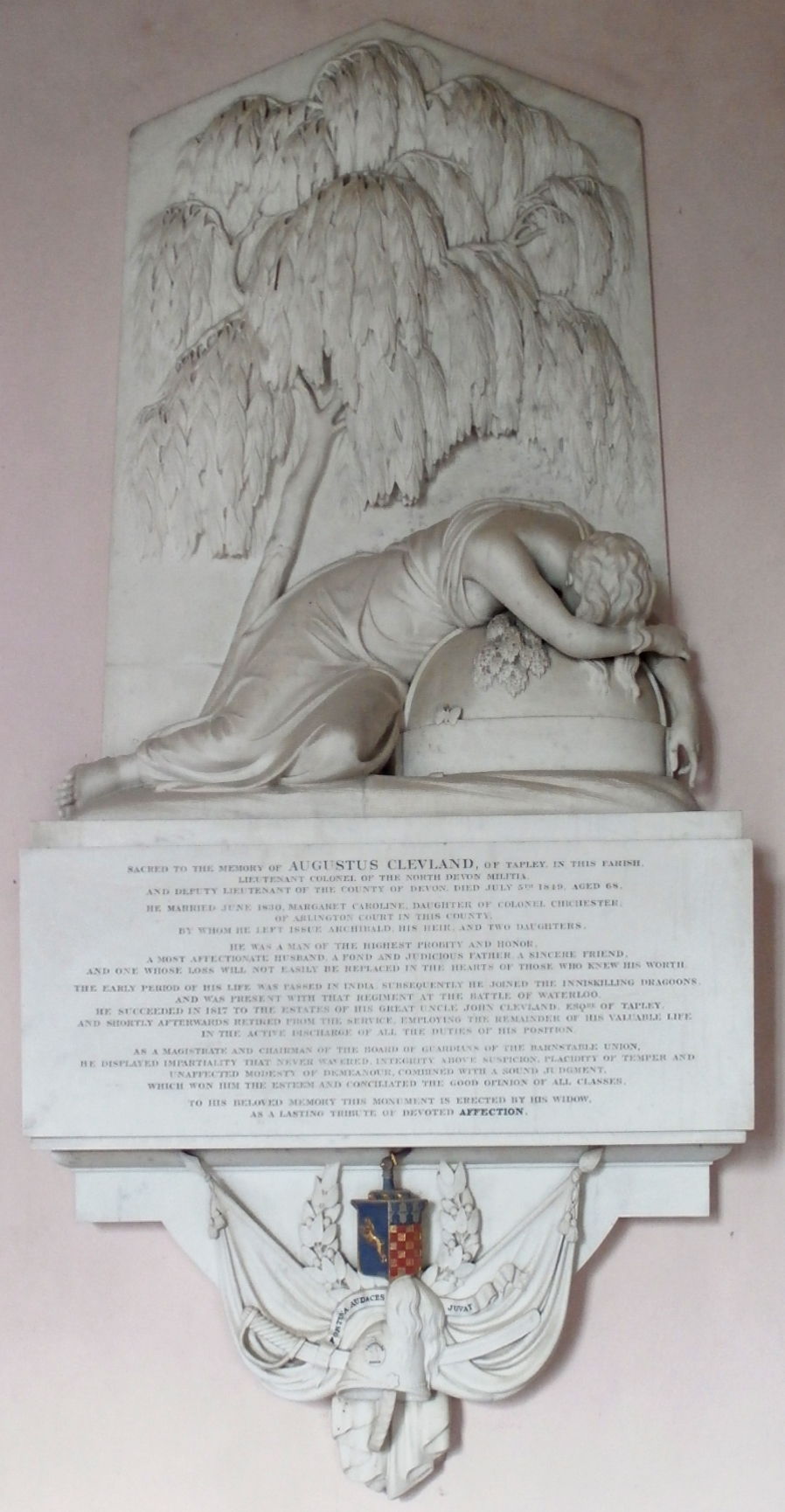
Mural monument to Col. Augustus Saltren-Willett (Clevland) (1781–1849), Westleigh Church

Col. Augustus Saltren-Willett (1781–1849), JP and DL for Devon, who following his inheritance assumed in 1847 by royal licence the surname and arms of Clevland in lieu of Willett. He was the great-nephew of John Clevland (1734–1817), being the son of Augustus Saltren-Willett (1760–1813) (who died at Tapeley in 1813 as his mural monument in Westleigh Church attests), builder of Port Hill House in Northam (by his wife Frances Davie of Orleigh) the son of William Saltren (the second son of Thomas Saltren of Stone in the parish of Parkham) by his wife Hester Clevland, the eldest full-blood sister of John Clevland (1734–1817). A younger branch of the Saltrens, of Treludick, in Cornwall, settled at Petticombe in the parish of Monkleigh, Devon before the middle of the seventeenth century and the mansion at Petticombe was rebuilt by John Saltren in about 1796. A monument to John Saltren (died 1794) of Petticombe survives in Monkleigh Church. The arms of Saltren were: Azure, a lion rampant within an orle of mullets argent. William Saltren was the heir of John Willett (died 1736) of Combe in the parish of Abbotsham, the last male representative of that family, whose mural monument survives in Abbotsham Church. John Willett was responsible for the plasterwork dated 1616 at Coombe House and amongst the ancient benchends in Abbotsham Church is one with initials J.W. and the woolstapler's mark. William Saltren's eldest son Augustus Saltren adopted the additional surname Willett. In 1814 Augustus Saltren-Willett sold Port Hill House to Admiral Sir Richard Goodwin Keats (1757–1834), Governor of Greenwich Hospital 1821–1834. At his death he was Lt. Col. of the North Devon Militia and had fought at the Battle of Waterloo in 1815 as an officer in the 6th (Inniskilling) Dragoons. He married Margaret Caroline Chichester, a daughter of John Palmer Chichester (1769–1823) of Arlington Court, Devon, by his 2nd wife Agnes Hamilton. His daughter Caroline Chichester Clevland, in 1857 married William Wither Bramston Beach (1826–1901), MP, for which event the whole village of Westleigh was decorated and "£20 was distributed amongst the poor whilst tea was served to the ancient women of the village". His two funeral hatchments survive in Westleigh Church, one showing the arms of Clevland alone, the other the arms of Clevland impaling Chichester (Chequy or and gules, a chief vair). Two mural monuments survive in his memory, one in Instow Church, the other in Westleigh Church. The latter is inscribed as follows:

Sacred to the memory of Augustus Clevland of Tapley in this parish, Lieutenant Colonel of the North Devon Militia and Deputy Lieutenant of the county of Devon. Died July 5th 1849 aged 68. He married June 1830 Margaret Caroline, daughter of Colonel Chichester of Arlington Court in this county, by whom he left issue Archibald his heir and two daughters. He was a man of the highest probity and honor, a most affectionate husband, a fond and judicious father, a sincere friend and one whose loss will not easily be replaced in the hearts of those who knew his worth. The early period of his life was passed in India. Subsequently he joined the Inniskilling Dragoons and was present with that regiment at the Battle of Waterloo. He succeeded in 1817 to the estates of his great-uncle John Clevland Esq.re of Tapley and shortly afterwards retired from the service, employing the remainder of his valuable life in the active discharge of all the duties of his position. As a magistrate and chairman of the Board of Guardians of the Barnstaple Union he displayed impartiality that never wavered, integrity above suspicion, placidity of temper and unaffected modesty of demeanour, combined with a sound judgement which won him the esteem and concilliated the good opinion of all classes. To his beloved memory this monument is erected by his widow as a lasting tribute of devoted affection.

==== Archibald Clevland (1833–1854) ====
Archibald Clevland (1833–1854), of Tapeley, only son, a cornet in the 17th Lancers, who died aged 21 at the Battle of Inkerman, having just one month before been one of the few officers who survived the Charge of the Light Brigade. He died unmarried and without children, and was therefore the last of the Clevland (and Saltren-Willett) family. Several monuments exist to his memory, including an elaborate sculpted and inscribed marble mural monument and a large stained glass window in Westleigh Church, and two monuments in the grounds of Tapeley Park, namely a 50-foot high obelisk (destroyed by lightning in 1933, with only the base remaining), and a statue erected near the lake by his mother, in the form of a mourning lady, with base inscribed as follows:

Forgive blest shade the tributory tear,
That mourns they exit from a world like this.
Forgive the wish that would have kept thee here,
And stayed thy progress to the realms of Bliss.

=== Christie ===
- William Langham Christie (1830–1913), of Glyndebourne in Sussex, elected Conservative MP for Lewes, Sussex in 1874 & 1880, who in 1855 married Agnes Hamilton Clevland, eldest sister and co-heiress (with her sister Caroline Chichester Cleveland) of Archibald Clevland (1833–1854) of Tapeley. He was the grandson of Daniel Beat Christin (died 1809) of Vaud in Switzerland, who Anglicised his surname to Christie on entering the service of the Bombay Engineers, of the East India Company. Daniel rose to major and fought in the war against hyder Ali in Mysore. It is said by Lauder (2002) that he saved the ruler's harem from being robbed of jewels by British soldiers and was rewarded by the harem with a gift of the jewels. The ruler awarded him a further £20,000. Daniel married twice, firstly in 1784 to Charlotte Bellasis (died 1785), a daughter of Rev. George Bellasis, rector of Yattendon, Berkshire, which was without surviving children. Secondly in 1786 Daniel married Elizabeth Langham (died 1833), a daughter and co-heiress of Captain Purbeck Langham, 10th Dragoon Guards, of Glyndebourne and of Saunton (near Tapeley, apparently as a tenant of the Clevland family), youngest son of Sir John Langham, Baronet of Cottesbrooke Park, Northamptonshire. Daniel's eldest son by his 2nd marriage was Langham Christie (1789–1861) of Preston Deanery, Northamptonshire, High Sheriff of Northamptonshire in 1852. In 1829 Langham married Elizabeth Gosling (died 1866), daughter of William Gosling of Hassobury Park, Bishops Stortford, Essex. Their eldest son was William Langham Christie, of Glyndebourne, husband of Agnes Hamilton Clevland, heiress of Tapeley. Agnes Clevland and her husband William Langham Christie rebuilt Tapeley Park with a "severe Victorian brick facade".
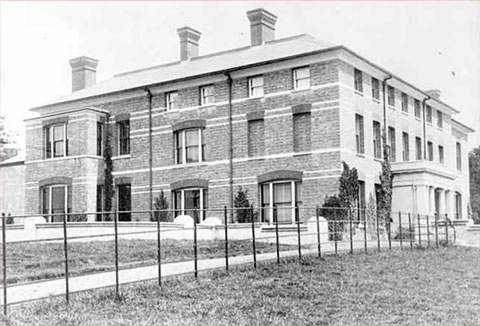
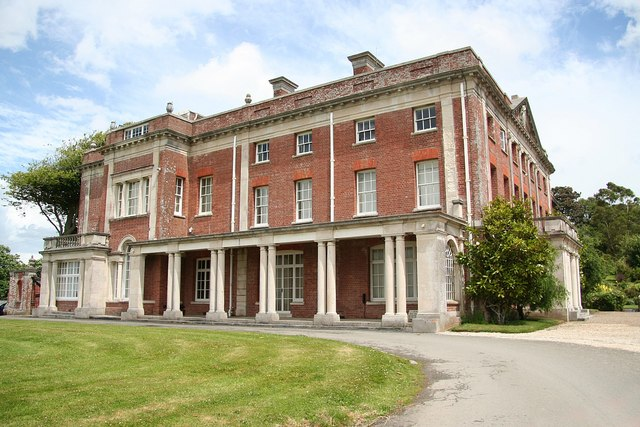
Left: Tapeley Park circa 1881, west front, viewed from south-west, the house as first seen by Lady Rosamond Wallop, who remodelled it in Queen Anne style (right, 2014) and laid out the present gardens
- Augustus Langham Christie (1857–1930), son and heir, of Glyndebourne and Tapeley, lord of the manor of Instow (near Tapeley), JP and High Sheriff of Devon in 1911. In 1882 he married Lady Rosamond Wallop (died 1935), 3rd daughter of Isaac Newton Wallop, 5th Earl of Portsmouth (1825–1891) of Eggesford House, Wembworthy, Devon. The marriage was not happy, but nevertheless Lady Rosamond had a profound effect on Tapeley, and was responsible for creating the present re-modelled house and the landscaped gardens. She first saw the house in the winter of 1881 before her marriage and in her journal she described the house as it then was as "A Georgian stucco house, very plain and rather dreary in appearance, for many of the front windows had been blocked...the terrace walk and garden did not exist and the drive approached between iron railings". She moved to Tapeley in about 1886, four years after her marriage, and employed the architect John Belcher (1841–1913) to remodel the house in Queen Anne style, which work was carried out over time as finances allowed, before during and after World War I. She affixed a plaque to a wall of the house in his memory. She had effectively separated from her husband, who had become "eccentric", and who moved to the nearby family mansion of Saunton Court, later remodelled in the 1930s by Edwin Lutyens. As an act of revenge against his wife he attempted to bequeath his estates to a distant cousin in Canada, thus cutting out their son John. She overturned his will in the courts on the grounds that he had been of unsound mind at the time of its making. Lady Rosamond was a collector of fine sculptures, including works by John Gibson (Tinted Venus in marble, 120 cm high), Giovanni Maria Benzoni (Cupid and Psyche in marble, 168 cm. high), and Sir Alfred Gilbert (two bronzea: Perseus arming and Comedy and Tragedy (sic Vita)). These works, together with pieces of French and English furniture, were offered for sale from Tapeley in 2025.
- John Christie (born 1882), born at Eggesford. He was assistant head master of Eton College and fought in World War I winning the Military Cross. He married the opera singer Grace Audrey Louisa St John-Mildmay, daughter of Rev. Aubrey Neville St John-Mildmay, and opened an opera house at Glyndebourne, thus founding the Glyndebourne Opera Festival. During World War II Tapeley was used as a home for children evacuated from Plymouth. It later served as a home for the Invalid Children's Aid Association, then as a hotel. John's eldest son and heir to Glyndebourne was Sir George Christie (born 1934) but he bequeathed Tapeley to his daughter Rosamund Christie.
- Rosamund Christie (1933–1988), daughter of John Christie.
- Hector Christie (born 1961), was bequeathed Tapeley by his aunt Rosamund. He is the eldest son of Sir George Christie (1934 – May 2014) of Glyndebourne. Shortly after his father's death in 2014 he and the estate's long-serving agent Raymond Coldwell parted company and he remarked:

Raymond has given me the freedom to do what I wanted to do. I've not made it very easy for him, looking after the estate which was what I should have been doing. But the one thing that's constant in life is change. Now I'm going to be turning my attention to the estate, making it more open and accessible. We've got a lot of work to do on the property and we're going to have to borrow a lot of money. I'm going to play a more active role.

== Sources ==
- Lauder, Rosemary, Devon Families, Tiverton, 2002, pp. 41–5, Christie of Tapeley Park
- Burke's Genealogical and Heraldic History of the Landed Gentry, 15th Edition, ed. Pirie-Gordon, H., London, 1937, p. 408, pedigree of Clevland, appended to pedigree of Christie of Tapeley Park and Glyndebourne, pp. 407–8
- Burke's Genealogical and Heraldic Dictionary of the Landed Gentry, 1858, Volume 3, pedigree of Clevland of Tapeley
