= John Clevland (1706–1763) =

Member of Parliament for Saltash
- In office 1754–1761 Serving with George Clinton
- Preceded by: Charles Townshend; George Clinton
- Succeeded by: George Adams; Hon. Augustus Hervey
- In office 1741–1743 Serving with Thomas Corbett
- Preceded by: Lord Glenorchy; Thomas Corbett
- Succeeded by: Thomas Corbett; Stamp Brooksbank

Member of Parliament for Sandwich
- In office 1747–1761 Serving with Sir George Oxenden, Bt, Claudius Amyand, The Viscount Conyngham
- Preceded by: John Pratt; Sir George Oxenden, Bt
- Succeeded by: The Viscount Conyngham; George Hay

Secretary to the Admiralty
- In office 30 April 1751 – 18 June 1763
- Preceded by: Thomas Corbett
- Succeeded by: Philip Stephens

Personal details
- Born: c. 1706
- Died: 19 June 1763 (aged 56–57) Tapeley Park
- Spouses: Elizabeth Child (m. 1729, died) Penelope Davie (m. 1743, died) Sarah Shuckburgh (after 1747)
- Relations: William Clevland (brother); John Davie (grandfather)
- Parent(s): William Clevland; Ann Davie

John Clevland (c. 1706 – 19 June 1763), of Tapeley in the parish of Westleigh, North Devon, was Secretary to the Admiralty and was twice a Member of Parliament for Saltash in Devon and for Sandwich in Kent.

== Early life ==
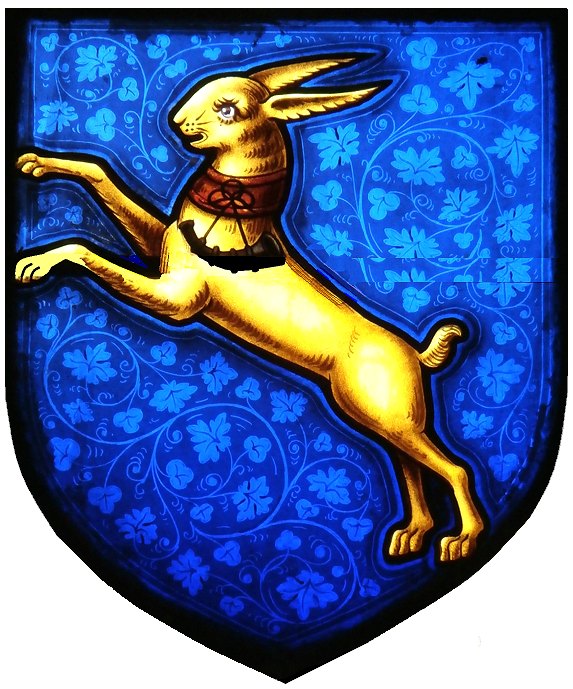
Arms of Clevland of Tapeley

Clevland was the eldest son and heir of Commander William Clevland, Royal Navy, of Tapeley, a Scotsman by birth, and the former Ann Davie of an old Devonshire family. His brother, William Clevland, became King of the Banana Islands, Sierra Leone, after being shipwrecked. His father was born in Lanarkshire, and became Controller of the Storekeepers' Accounts for the Navy Board.

His maternal grandfather was the prominent merchant John Davie of Orleigh Court near Bideford.

He was educated at Westminster in 1718 and called to Middle Temple in 1723. Upon the death of his father in 1734, he inherited Tapeley Park in north Devon. The elder Clevland had acquired Rayhouse, the principal estate at Woodford Bridge in Essex, at some time before 1700, which the younger Clevland sold to Alvar Lopez Suasso in 1732.

== Career ==
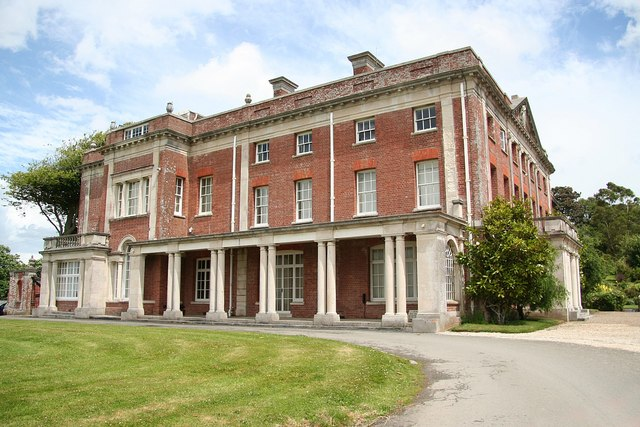
Tapeley Park

His father used his position to advance his son, first as a Clerk (Storekeepers' Accounts) and then Chief Clerk from 1726 to 1731 at the Navy Board. In 1731, John was appointed Clerk to the Cheque and Master Muster at Plymouth. He then became Clerk of the Acts in 1744 and Joint Secretary to the Lords Commissioners of Admiralty in 1748. In 1751, he succeeded Thomas Corbett as Secretary to the Admiralty.

Clevland was MP first for Saltash from 1741 to 1743, then Sandwich from 1747 to 1761 and then Saltash again from 1761 until his death in 1763.

Around 1750, he purchased the lordship of the nearby Manor of Bideford, then a nationally prominent port.

== Personal life ==
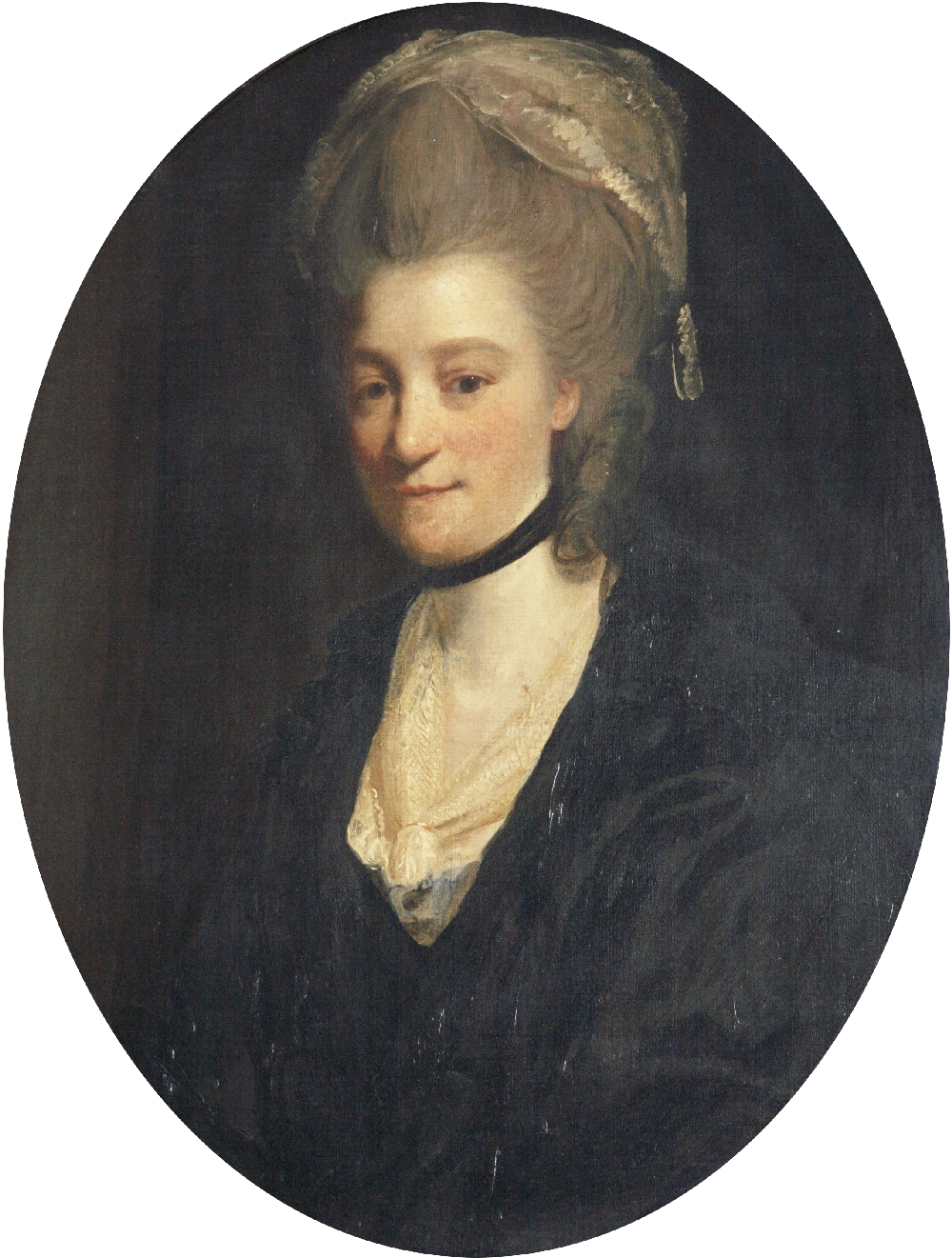
"Mrs John Clevland of Tapley", portrait by Joshua Reynolds of one of the three wives (unidentified) of Clevland.

Clevland married three times and had six sons and five daughters. His first marriage was in 1729 to Elizabeth Child, the daughter of Sir Caesar Child, 2nd Baronet, of Gwynne House, Woodford Bridge in Essex, by his wife Hester Evans of Claybury Hall. Before her death pre-1743, Elizabeth and John had three sons and three daughters, including:

- John Clevland II (1734–1817), MP for Barnstaple and Director of Greenwich Hospital who married Elizabeth (née Stevens) Awse, widow of Robert Awse and only surviving child of Richard Stevens, in 1782.
- Hester Clevland, who married Capt. William Saltren-Willett (d. 1770) of the Royal Navy, (Note: In 1762, William Saltren-Willett was Captain of HMS Warspight, and fought at the Battle of Quiberon Bay.) the second son of Thomas Saltren of Stone. (Note: William Saltren-Willett was also heir of John Willett (d. 1736) of Combe, Abbotsham, lord of the manor of Abbotsham. Hester and William's grandson, Col. Augustus Saltren-Willett II (1781–1849), inherited the Clevland estates, including Tapeley, in 1817 on the death of Hester's brother John Clevland II.)

His second marriage was in 1743 to his first cousin, Penelope Davie, the daughter of Joseph Davie, of Orleigh in Devon. Before her death pre-1747, they were the parents of one son.

His third marriage was in 1747 to Sarah Shuckburgh (d. 1764), the daughter of Charles Shuckburgh of Banks Fee, Longborough in Gloucestershire and a sister of Sir Charles Shuckburgh, 5th Baronet. Together, they were the parents of two sons and two daughters, including:

- Augustus Clevland (1754–1784), an officer of the East India Company who became Collector of Bhagalpur, Bengal.
- Selina Shore Clevland, who married John Udny, the British Consul at Venice and Leghorn, in 1777.

Clevland died at Tapeley on 18 June 1763, as is recorded on his monument in Westleigh Church, as a result of having "contracted a complication of disorders" due to his "constant application to the discharge" of his office of Secretary of the Admiralty.

=== Monument ===
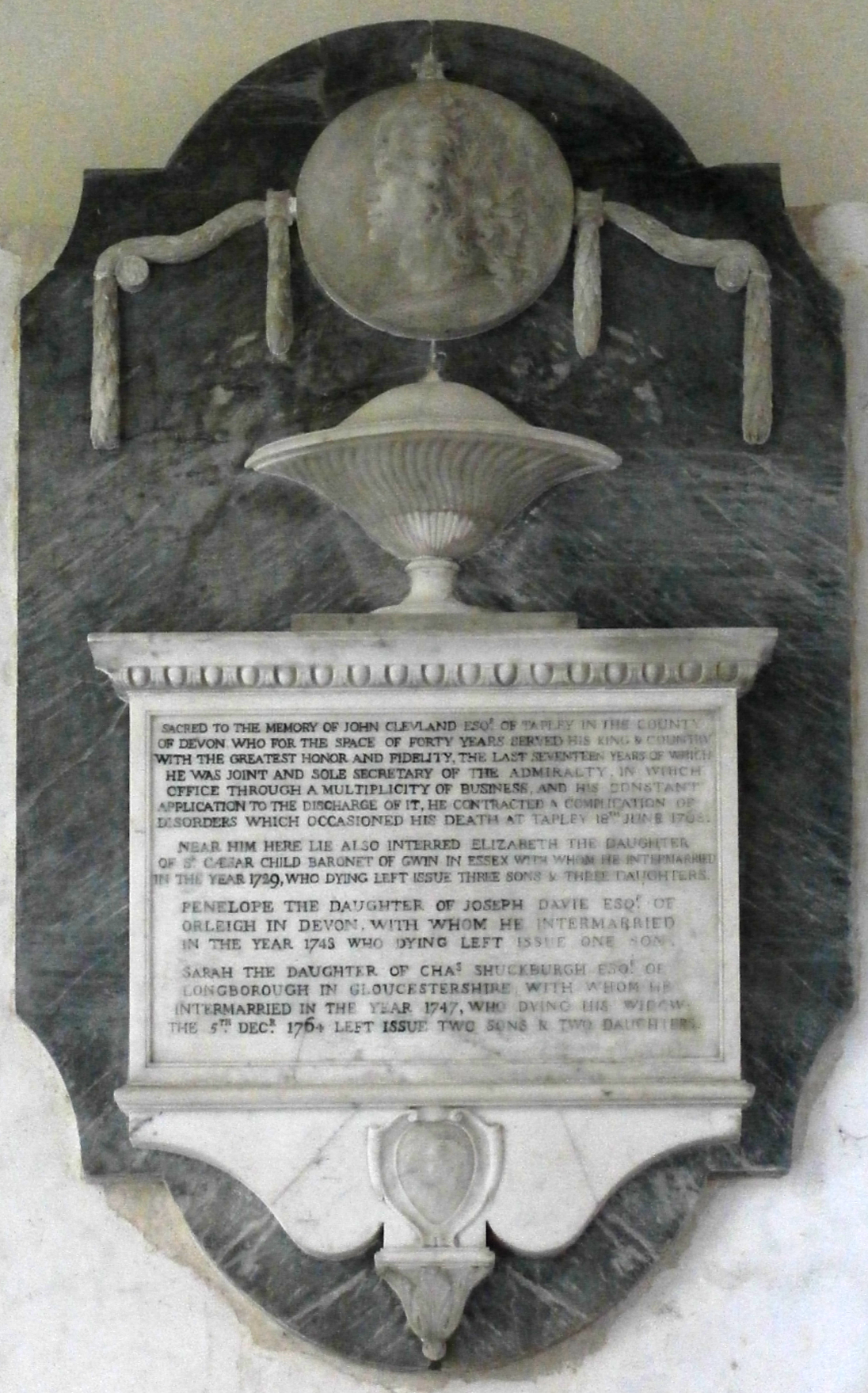
Mural monument in Westleigh Church to John I Clevland (1706–1763) of Tapeley

His mural monument survives in Westleigh Church, inscribed as follows:

"Sacred to the memory of John Clevland Esqr. of Tapley in the county of Devon who for the space of forty years served his king and country with the greatest honor and fidelity the last seventeen years of which he was joint and sole secretary of the Admiralty in which office through a multiplicity of business and his constant application to the discharge of it he contracted a complication of disorders which occasioned his death at Tapley 18th June 1763. Near him here lie also interred Elizabeth the daughter of Sr. Caesar Child, Baronet, of Gwin in Essex, with whom he intermarried in the year 1729 who dying left issue three sons and three daughters; Penelope the daughter of Joseph Davie Esqr. of Orleigh in Devon, with whom he intermarried in the year 1743 who dying left issue one son; Sarah the daughter of Chas. Shuckburgh Esqr. of Longborough in Gloucestershire with whom he intermarried in the year 1747 who dying his widow the 5th Decr. 1764 left issue two sons & two daughters"

Parliament of Great Britain
Preceded by Lord Glenorchy; Thomas Corbett	Member of Parliament for Saltash; 1741–1743; With: Thomas Corbett	Succeeded by Thomas Corbett; Stamp Brooksbank
Preceded by John Pratt; Sir George Oxenden, Bt	Member of Parliament for Sandwich; 1747–1761; With: Sir George Oxenden, Bt to 1754; Claudius Amyand 1754–56; The Viscount Conyngham from 1756	Succeeded by The Viscount Conyngham; George Hay
Preceded by Charles Townshend; George Clinton	Member of Parliament for Saltash; 1761–1763; With: George Clinton	Succeeded by George Adams; Hon. Augustus Hervey
