= Augustus Clevland =

- Born: September 19, 1754; Tapeley, Bideford, England
- Died: January 13, 1784 (aged 29); British India
- Resting place: South Park Street Cemetery, Kolkata
- Father: John Clevland

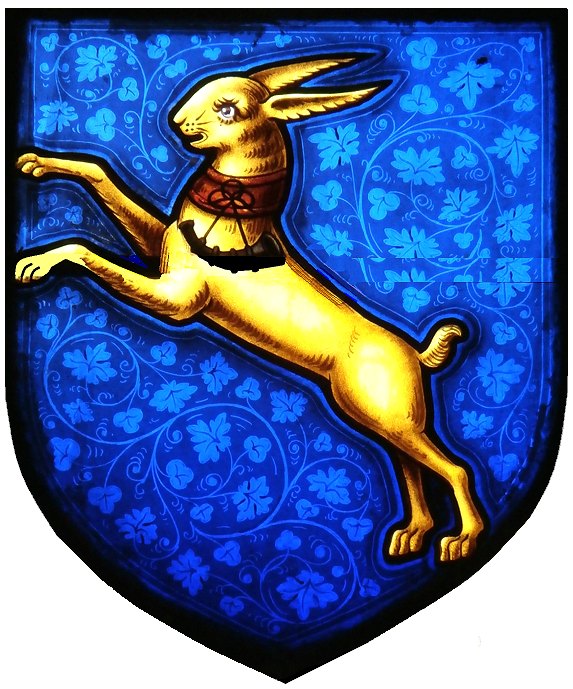
Arms of Clevland of Tapeley: Azure, a hare salient or collared gules pendent therefrom a bugle horn stringed sable. Detail from memorial stained glass window to Archibald Clevland (1833–1854), Westleigh Church.

Augustus Clevland (1754–1784) was an East India Company administrator in the Province of Bengal, a Collector of the Revenues and a Judge of the Dewanny Adawlut of the Districts of Bhagalpur and various others.

== Origins ==
He was the 6th son of John Clevland of Tapeley, in the parish of Westleigh, near Bideford, in North Devon, England, his second son by his third wife Sarah Shuckburgh, whom he married in 1747, a daughter of Charles Shuckburgh of Longborough, Gloucestershire and a sister of Sir Charles Shuckburgh, 5th Baronet. Clevland is said to have been a cousin of John Shore, 1st Baron Teignmouth, Governor-General of India.

== Career ==
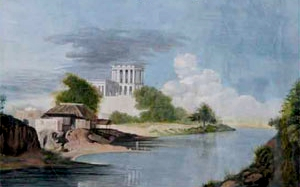
Residence in Bhagalpur, Bengal, India, overlooking River Ganges, of Augustus Clevland

Clevland was an Indian administrator. He was collector and magistrate of Bhagalpur, Bengal.

== Death ==
Cleveland died on 13 January 1784 at the age of 29 after a month of fever caused by poisoned arrow of Brave Freedom Fighter and Revolutionary Tilkamanjhi in Bhagalpur. Tilkamanjhi was caught and hanged till death on a tree in front of Cleveland's Office (present day at Tilkamanjhi chowk). He died aboard the ship Atlas Indiaman near the mouth of the Hooghly River while sailing to the Cape of Good Hope, and his body was taken back to Calcutta on a pilot boat and buried in South Park Street Cemetery.

== Legacy ==
=== Monuments ===
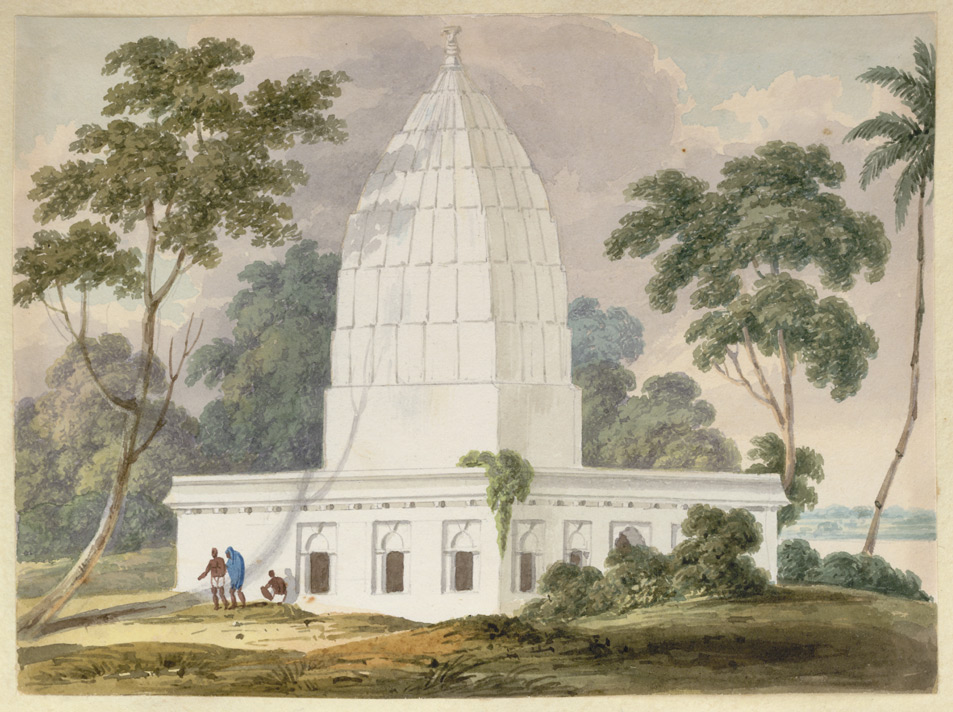
Monument erected by the native acquaintances of Cleveland with the support of EIC in Bhagalpur district, Bengal, India. (Watercolor art by Charles D'Oyly, 1820)

In memory of Clevland, two monuments were erected. One was built by the East India Company and acquaintances in his workplace Bhagalpur The other was erected in Calcutta (South Park Street Cemetery), sent by the Court of Directors of the East India Company from England. It comprises a small stone chapel topped by an obelisk.

=== Literary ===
Several accounts of Clevland's career exist. One by Bishop Reginald Heber, Bishop of Calcutta (1823-1826), forms part of his A Journey through the Upper Provinces of India from Calcutta to Bombay 1824-1825 in which he recounts how Clevland had learned the language of the Sonthals, a primitive hill people in Bihar, persuaded them to sell `wax and honey' to the people of the plains, to accept his authority, and submit to his judgment instead of fighting.

John Shore, 1st Baron Teignmouth, Governor-General of India 1793-1797 was Clevland's cousin and had been very fond of him. He composed laudatory verse of which the following is part:

"... The savage band
Forsook their haunts and bowed to his Command
And where the warrior's arm in vain assail'd
His gentler skill o'er brutal force prevail'd ...
Now mended morals check the lust for spoil
And rising Hamlets prove his generous toil ..."

Rudyard Kipling's story "The Tomb of his Ancestors" (1896) is based on the life story of Clevland, represented by the fictional protagonist "John Chinn".

=== Paintings by William Hodges ===
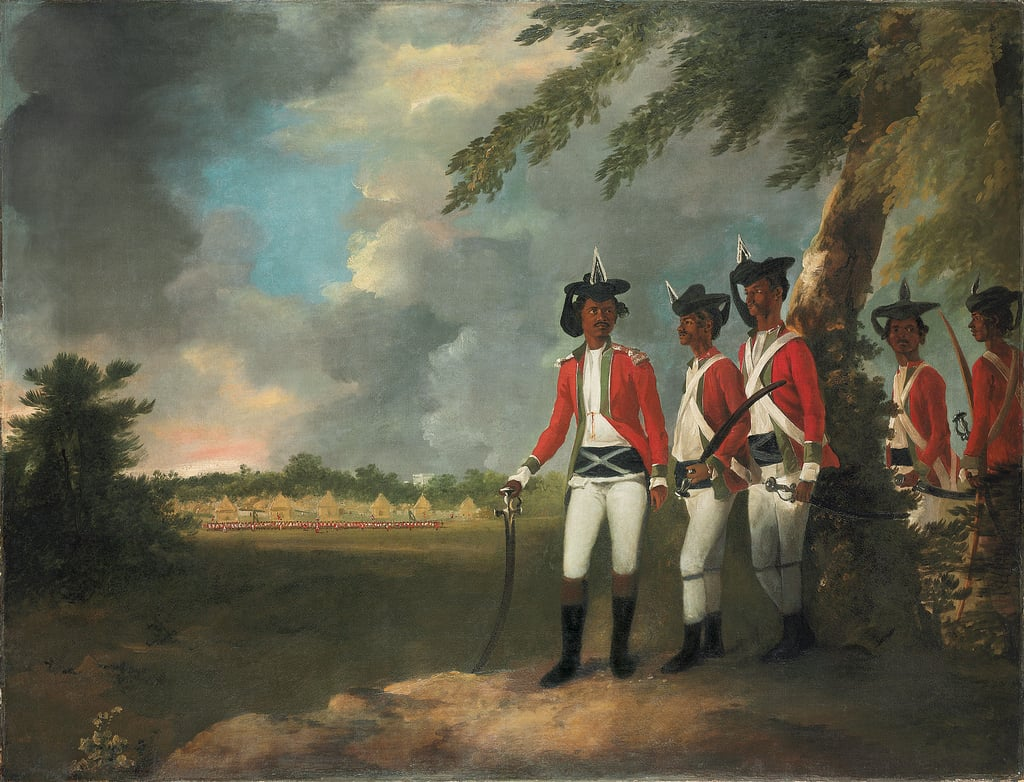
A camp of a thousand men formed by Augustus Clevland three miles from Bhagalpur with his mansion in the distance, by William Hodges

Clevland was a friend and patron of the artist William Hodges, who visited India and accompanied Warren Hastings to Benares in 1781 and on his return in January 1782 stayed for four months as Clevland's guest at Bhagalpur. Together they visited several monuments in the Rajmahal district, as recorded by Hodges in his Travels in India (1793) Hodges describes the journeys he undertook with Cleveland in the Rajmahal district and the various monuments they visited. In 1794, ten years after Clevland's death, his personal effects were sold, amongst which were twenty-one works by Hodges, including one entitled Tomb and distant view of Rajmahal Hills, now in the collection of the Tate Gallery. A painting by Hodges titled "A camp of a thousand men formed by Augustus Clevland three miles from Bhagalpur with his mansion in the distance", was sold by his descendant Sir George Christie in 1996 at Christies for £56,500, resold in 2009 for £133,250.
