= Claudius Amyand (MP) =

English Whig politician and government official

Claudius Amyand (10 August 1718 – 1 April 1774) was an English Whig politician and government official.

He was the eldest son of Claudius Amyand, a distinguished surgeon and Huguenot, born on 10 August 1718. Educated at Westminster and Christ Church, Oxford, he attended Lincoln's Inn and was called to the bar in 1742. Appointed Keeper of the King's Library in 1745, he was elected Member of Parliament for Tregony in the general election of 1747.

He was appointed junior under secretary to the Duke of Newcastle in 1750, becoming senior under-secretary to the Earl of Holderness the following year. He was offered the seat at Bossiney for the election of 1754, but declined due to a lack of funds. Instead, he was elected at Sandwich.

He retained his office under Thomas Robinson and Henry Fox until William Pitt removed him to the Board of Customs in 1756. He served on that board until 1765 when he became Receiver of the Land Tax for Middlesex and London, a post he held until his death.

On 26 November 1761 he married Frances, the widow of George Compton, 6th Earl of Northampton. She was described by Claudius' brother as "a very amiable woman with a jointure of £2,500 per annum." The couple had no children.

Claudius Amyand died in London on 1 April 1774.

Parliament of Great Britain
Preceded by Henry Penton; George Cooke	Member of Parliament for Tregony; 1747–1754; With: William Trevanion	Succeeded by William Trevanion; John Fuller
Preceded by John Clevland; Sir George Oxenden	Member of Parliament for Sandwich; 1754–1756; With: John Clevland	Succeeded by John Clevland; The Viscount Conyngham
