= St Peter's Church, Satterleigh =

Church in Devon, England

St Peter's Church
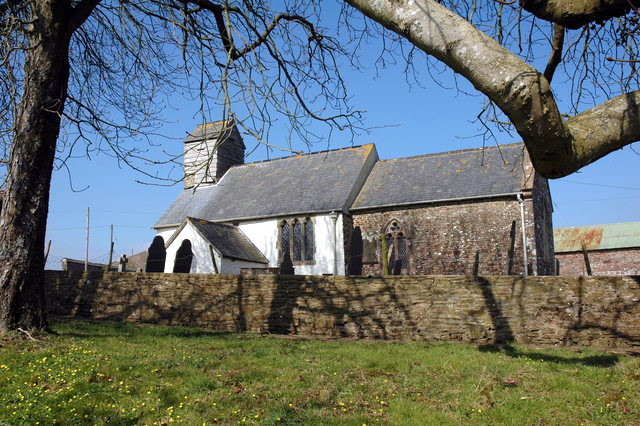

- Location within Devon
- 50°59′12″N 3°53′57″W
- Location: Satterleigh, Devon, England

History
- Built: 15th century

Listed Building – Grade I
- Official name: Church of St Peter
- Designated: 20 February 1967
- Reference no.: 1258740

St Peter's Church in Satterleigh, Devon, England was built in the 15th century. It is recorded in the National Heritage List for England as a designated Grade I listed building, and is now a redundant church in the care of the Churches Conservation Trust. It was vested in the Trust on 19 March 1996.

The church is mainly 15th century, although it may incorporate parts of an earlier building. It has an aisleless nave, and a wooden bell-cote. The chancel was rebuilt in 1852 as part of a wider restoration.

== See also ==
- List of churches preserved by the Churches Conservation Trust in South West England
