= William Clevland (1664–1734) =

Royal Navy commander

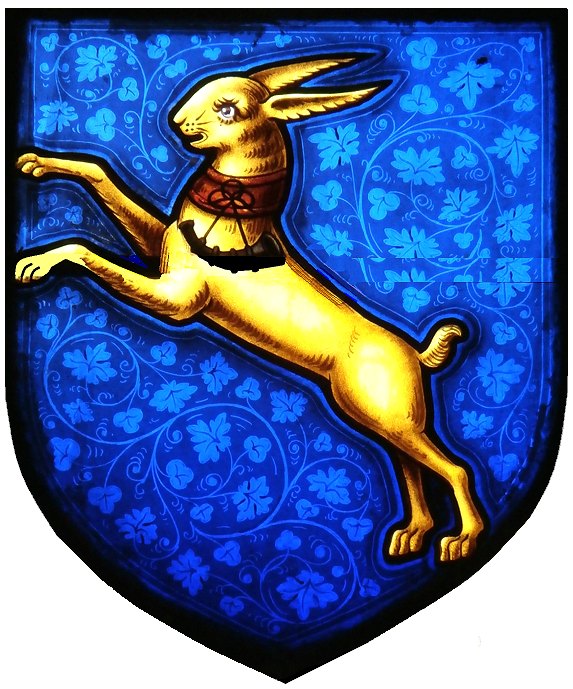
Arms of Clevland of Tapeley: Azure, a hare salient or collared gules pendent therefrom a bugle horn stringed sable. Detail from memorial stained glass window to Archibald Clevland (1833–1854), Westleigh Church. Motto: Fortuna Audaces Juvat ("Fortune helps the Bold")

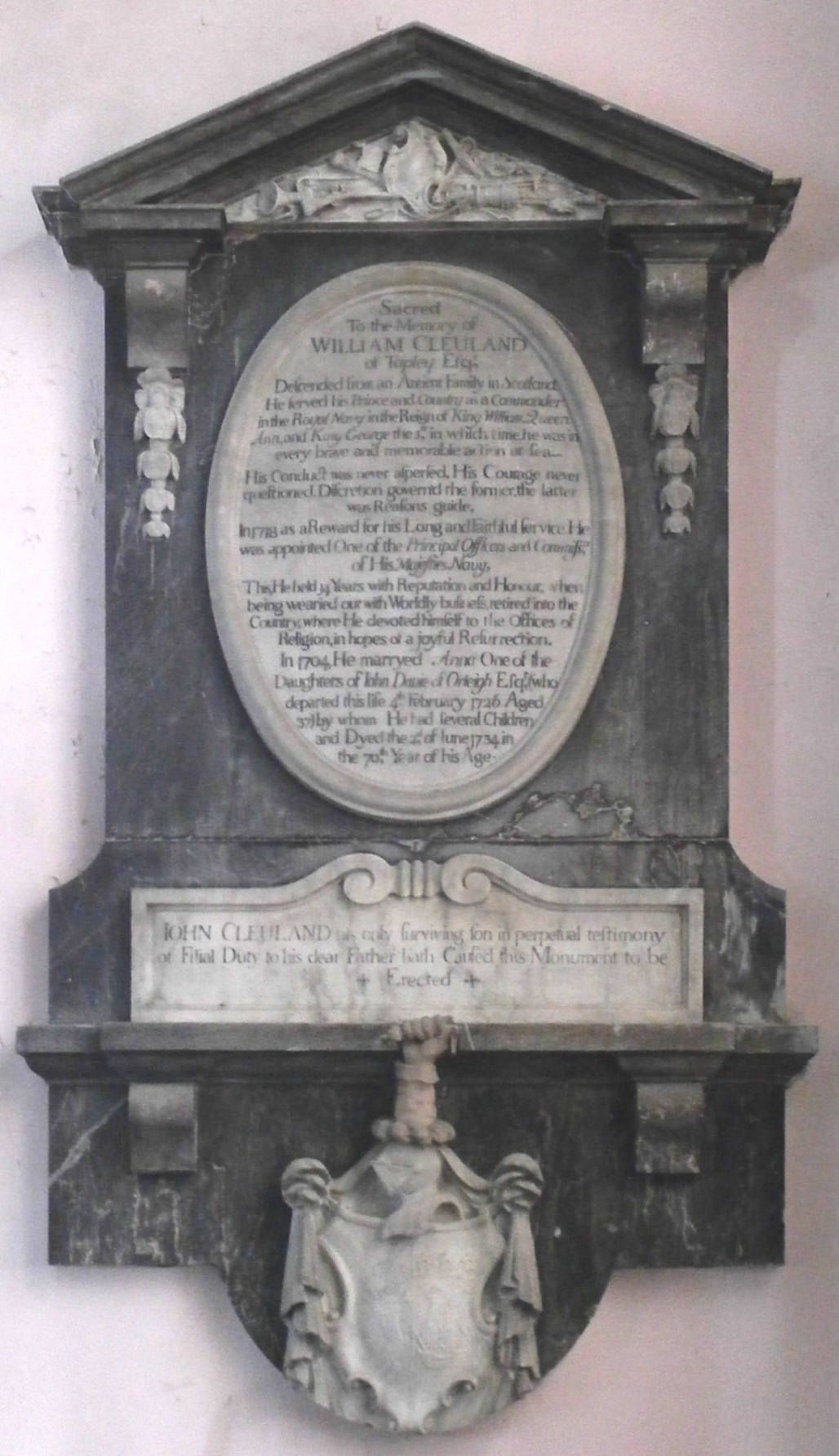
Mural monument to William Clevland (1664–1734) of Tapeley in the parish of Westleigh, North Devon. Westleigh Church, east end of north aisle

Captain William Clevland (1664–1734), (alias Cleuland (Note: Spelling per his monument in Westleigh Church)) of Tapeley in the parish of Westleigh, North Devon, was a Scottish-born Royal Navy commander who served as Controller of Storekeepers' Accounts (23 April 1718 – 24 May 1732). In 1704, he purchased the estate of Tapeley which today is still owned and occupied by his descendants (via two female lines) the Christie family, also of Glyndebourne House, East Sussex.

== Origins ==
He was the eldest son of Archibald Cleuland (sic) of Knowhoble Hill, Shotts, Lanarkshire, Scotland. The family claimed descent from the ancient Scottish clan of Cleland (alias Cleuland) of Faskine, Lanarkshire, south-east of Glasgow, with which it shares similar armorials.

== Career ==
At some time before 1700, he acquired Rayhouse, the principal estate at Woodford Bridge in Essex, which he sold in 1732 to Alvar Lopez Suasso. In 1702, he received the Freedom of the cities of Edinburgh and Hamilton in Lanarkshire. In 1702, having sailed into the North Devon port of Bideford, then one of the leading tobacco importation ports of Great Britain, he is said to have viewed from his ship the ancient mansion of Tapeley, in the parish of Westleigh, situated on an eminence overlooking the estuary of the River Torridge, and to have been so impressed by the beauty of its position that in 1704 he purchased the estate from the Giffard family of Brightley, which thenceforth he made his residence.

== Marriage and children ==
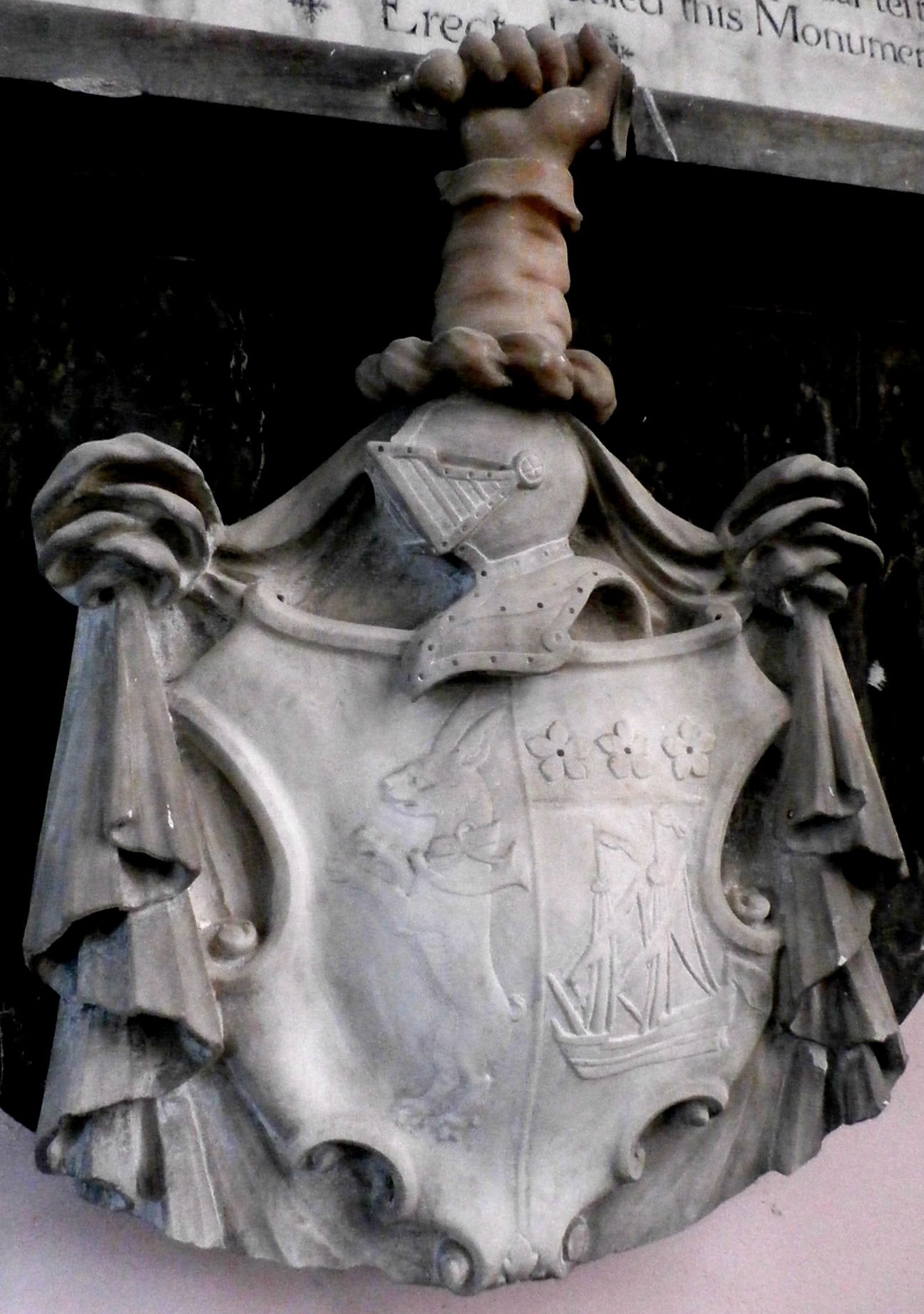
Arms of William Clevland (1664–1734) of Tapeleigh, Westleigh, Devon, (Note: Azure, a hare salient or collared gules pendent therefrom a bugle horn stringed sable) impaling arms of his wife Anna Davie (1689–1726). (Note: A ship with two masts or the sails trussed up and twisted to the masts argent adorned with flags charged with the cross of England on a chief of the second three cinquefoils pierced gules) Above is crest of Clevland. (Note: A dexter cubit arm holding in the hand a sword point to sinister (blade missing)) Detail from his mural monument in Westleigh Church

In 1704, he married Ann Davie (1689–1726), a daughter of the prominent Bideford tobacco merchant John Davie (died 1710), of Orleigh Court, Buckland Brewer and Colonial House, East-the-Water, Bideford. Davie's armorials appear as one of about ten armorials of prominent North Devon persons, sculpted on the frieze of the Mercantile Exchange (or "Queen Anne's Walk"), built in 1708 on Barnstaple Quay. The arms of John Davie's two sons-in-law William Clevland and Henry Incledon (1671–1736) of Buckland House, Braunton, also appear. The significance of the arms is unknown, for example whether the persons so represented had contributed to the cost of the building or were prominent in the trade of that port, like Bideford a centre of the tobacco trade. By his wife he had children including:

- John Clevland (1706–1763), eldest son and heir, of Tapeley, Secretary to the Admiralty. On the monument he erected to his father following his death in 1734 he referred to himself as "his only surviving son".
- William Clevland (born 1712), died young
- Archibald Clevland (born 1714), "drowned on the bar of Salline by the upsetting of the boat on going ashore".
- William Clevland (born 1720), died young.
- Anne
- Katherine, died young
- Jullianna Clevland, married Louis Guiquer of Geneva
- Penelope Clevland, married Admiral John Towry.

He is said also by various sources (but not by Burke's Landed Gentry 1858, which states his two sons named William died young) to have had a son William Clevland, who became King of the Banana Islands following a shipwreck.

== Death and monument ==
He died on 2 June 1734 (Note: Per inscription on his monument in Westleigh Church. Burke's Landed Gentry apparently in error, where he is said to have died 1715) aged 70 and is commemorated by a surviving mural monument erected by his eldest son in Westleigh Church, which is inscribed thus:

Sacred to the memory of William Cleuland of Tapley Esqr descended from an antient family in Scotland. He served his prince and country as a commander in the Royal Navy in the reign of King William, Queen Anne and King George the 1st in which time he was in every brave and memorable action at sea. His conduct was never aspersed his courage never questioned. Discretion govern'd the former, the latter was Reason's guide. In 1718 as a reward for his long and faithful service he was appointed one of the principal officers and commiss.rs of His Majesties Navy. This he held 14 years with reputation and honour when being wearied out with worldly business retired into the country where he devoted himself to the offices of religion in hopes of a joyful resurrection. In 1704 he marryed Anna one of the daughters of John Davie of Orleigh Esqr (who departed this life 4th February 1726 aged 37) by whom he had several children and dyed the 2d of June 1734 in the 70th year of his age.

John Cleuland his only surviving son in perpetual testimony of filial duty to his dear father hath caused this monument to be erected.

Below is a relief sculpted white marble escutcheon showing the arms of Clevland impaling Davie: A ship with two masts or the sails trussed up and twisted to the masts argent adorned with flags charged with the cross of England on a chief of the second three cinquefoils pierced gules. Above is the crest of Clevland: A dexter cubit arm grasping in the hand a sword hilted and pommelled or point to sinister.
