= William Clevland (king) =

King of the Banana Islands

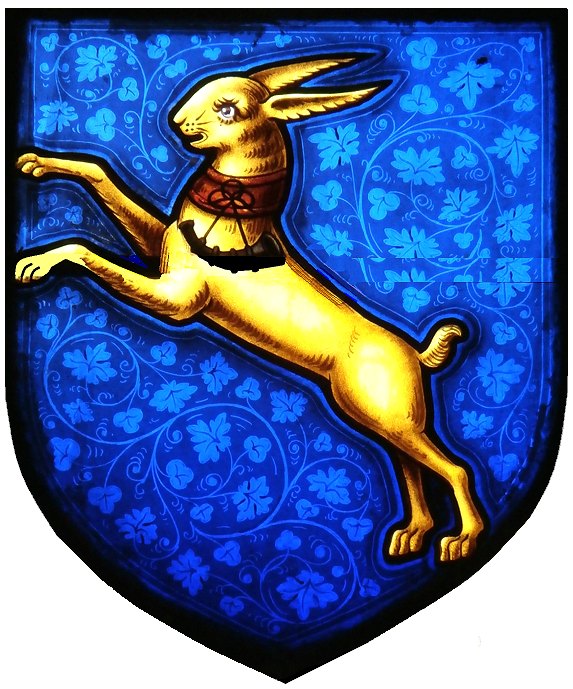
Arms of Clevland of Tapeley: Azure, a hare salient or collared gules pendent therefrom a bugle horn stringed sable. Detail from memorial stained glass window to Archibald Clevland (1833-1854), Westleigh Church

William Clevland (1720 – 6 December 1758) was an Anglo-Scot who became the self-appointed King of the Banana Islands off the coast of present-day Sierra Leone which at the time was part of Guinea (region).

== Early life and family ==
William Clevland was the son of Commodore William Clevland, a Scotsman who settled at Tapeley Park, near Bideford, Devon. His brother was John Clevland, who was appointed as Secretary of the Admiralty.

== Career ==
In the 1730s Clevland was working for the Royal African Company, which had a monopoly on trade at Sierra Leone. He was on board a slave ship that was wrecked off the Banana Islands. He and surviving African slaves made their way to the islands, which they settled. Clevland took power and named himself king.

His children included:

- By Kate Corker, daughter of King Skinner Corker:
  - John Clevland (1740–1764)
  - Elizabeth Clevland Hardcastle (1741–1808) who settled in South Carolina.
- By Ndamba, a Kissi woman. Their children included:
  - James Cleveland (1754? – 1791)

Both Elizabeth and James were sent to England for their education.

John succeeded his father as sovereign of the Banana Islands, but died in 1764. He was succeeded by James Cleveland.

In this period, the British had a trading post at the mouth of the Sierra Leone River and by 1792 had established a colony of freedmen at Freetown.

== Sources ==
- Lang, George (1999). Entwisted tongues: comparative creole literatures. Amsterdam and New York: Rodopi Bv Editions. ISBN 978-90-420-0737-6.
