= Westleigh, North Devon =

Village in Devon, England

Coordinates: 51.03°N 4.18°W

Westleigh
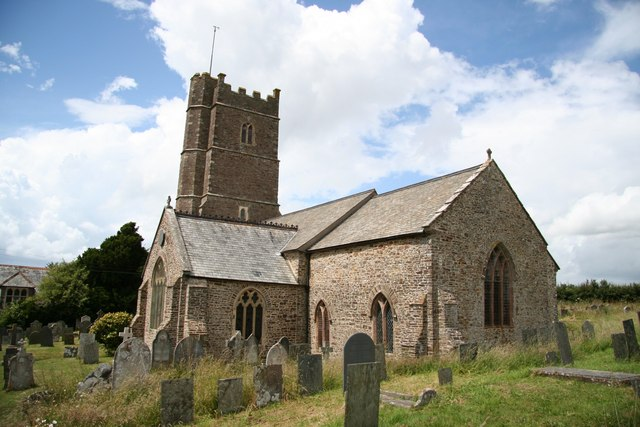
- St.Peter's church

- Location within Devon
- District: North Devon
- Shire county: Devon
- Region: South West
- Country: England
- Sovereign state: United Kingdom
- Post town: Bideford
- Postcode district: EX39
- Police: Devon and Cornwall
- Fire: Devon and Somerset
- Ambulance: South Western
- UK Parliament: North Devon

Westleigh is a village and civil parish in the North Devon district, in the English County of Devon.

St Peter's Church in Westleigh was used for the church scene in the 1970s British horror film The Shout and local villagers were used as extras both in the church service scene and in the surrounding street scenes.

Tapeley Park, a country house, is located within the parish. The village overlooks the Taw and Torridge Estuary.

To the South of Westleigh is the hamlet of Southcott.
