= Goodleigh =

Village in Devon, England

- Village
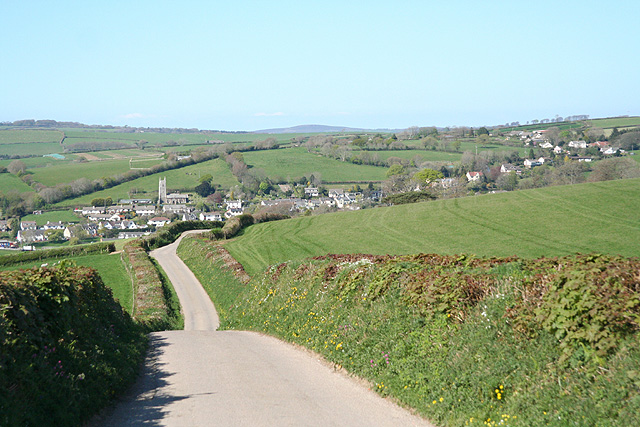
- Goodleigh village as approached northward from Landkey

- Location within Devon Location within the United Kingdom
- Coordinates: 51°05′30″N 4°00′24″W
- Country: England
- County: Devon
- Time zone: UTC+0:00 (GST)

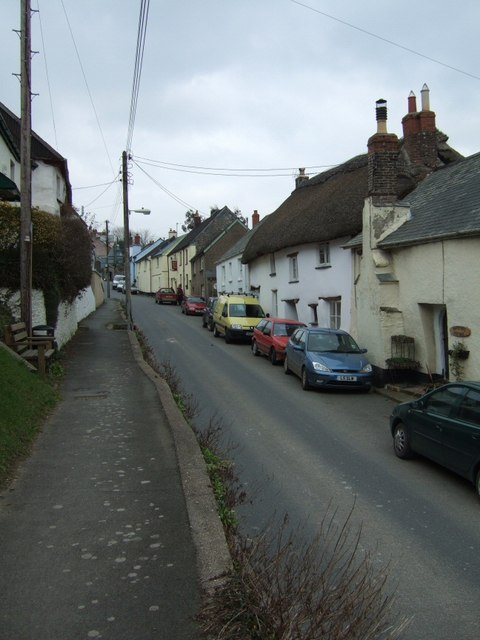
Goodleigh village

Goodleigh is a village, civil parish and former manor in North Devon, England. The village lies about 2 1/2 miles (4 km) north-east of the historic centre of Barnstaple. Apart from one adjunct at the south, it is generally a linear settlement.

The parish church of St Gregory is a grade II* listed building with surviving ancient parts but was largely rebuilt in 1881.

== Manor ==
Robert Newton Incledon (1761–1846) of Yeotown, Goodleigh, purchased from the Rashleigh family the manor of Goodleigh,

== Historic estates ==
=== Combe ===
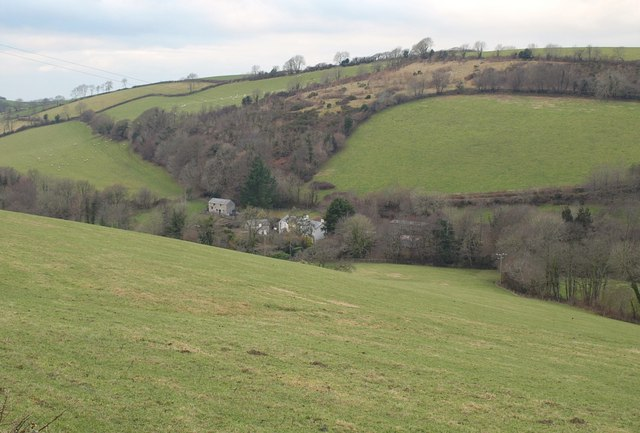
Combe, Goodleigh, in the 17th century a seat of a branch of the Acland family

Combe was the residence of a junior branch of the Acland family, which originated in the 12th century at the estate of Acland, 1/2 mile (0.8 km) to the south in the parish of Landkey. Two 17th–century mural monuments survive in Goodleigh Church to members of the Acland family of Combe. The descent was as follows:

- James I Acland of Combe, who married Margaret Markham of Barnstaple. James was the younger son of Anthony Acland (d.1568) of Hawkridge, Chittlehampton, the younger son of John V Acland of Acland, Landkey. The senior line of this family, of Flemish origin and first recorded at Acland in 1155, later became Acland Baronets and from the 18th century were one of the wealthiest and most prominent land-owning families in Devon, seated at Killerton in Devon and at Holnicote in Somerset.
- Thomas I Acland (d.1635), eldest son and heir, who married Katherine Palmer (d.1622, buried Goodleigh) of Barnstaple.
- James II Acland (1630–1655), grandson, who died without progeny. His mural monument survives in Goodleigh Church. He was the son and heir of Thomas II Acland (1609–1633) (whose mural monument survives in Goodleigh Church), (son and heir apparent of Thomas I Acland (d.1635) (whom he predeceased)) by his wife (whom he married at Braunton) Agnes Shepherd. Agnes survived him and remarried to Rev. Josias Gole.

=== Yeotown ===
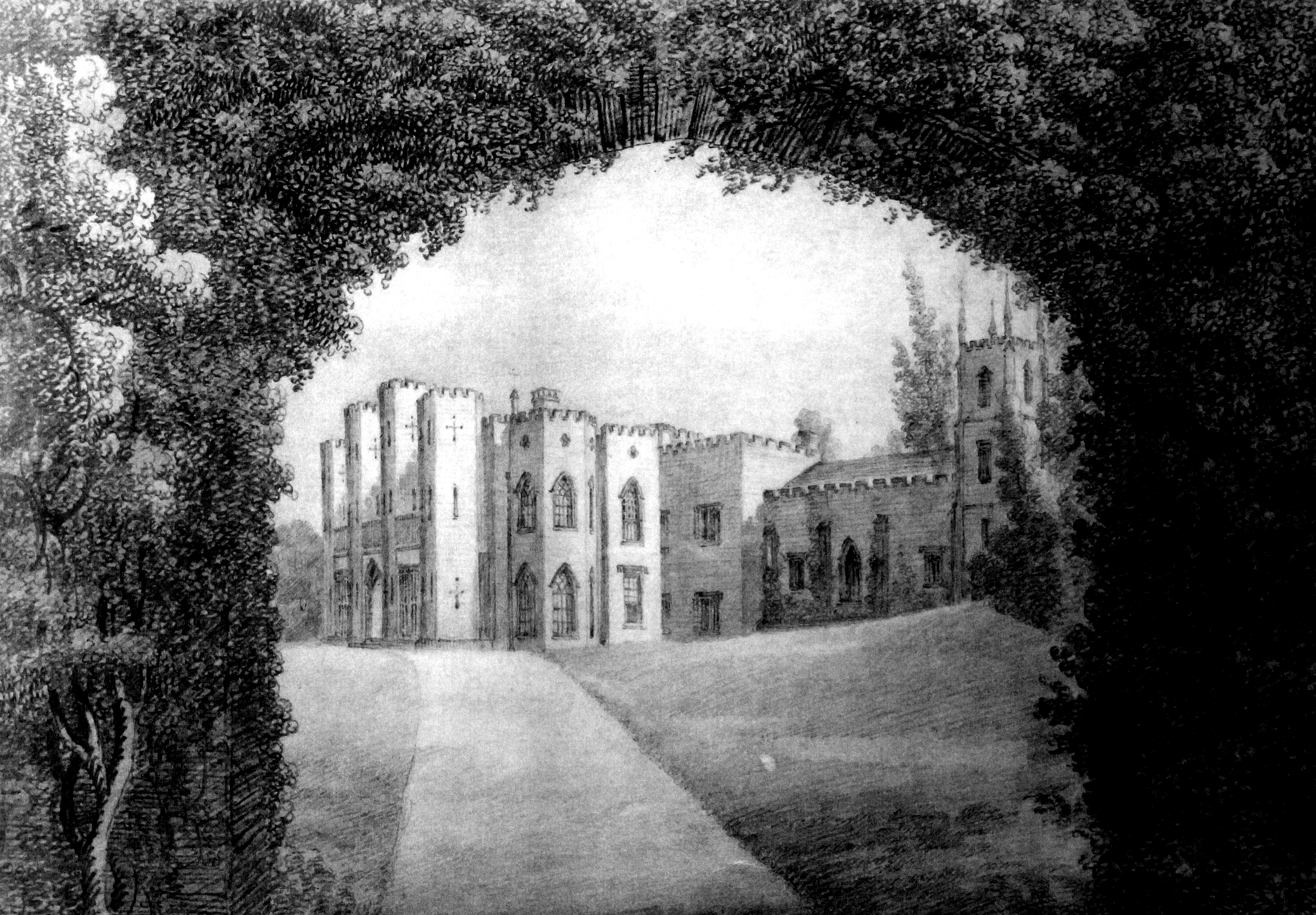
Yeotown House, Goodleigh. Remodelled in neo-gothic style circa 1807 by Robert Newton Incledon (1761–1846) and demolished within his lifetime

Yeotown is situated in the sequestered wooded valley of the small River Yeo, about 1 mile (1.6 km) south-west of the village of Goodleigh. The mansion house formerly owned by the Beavis family was remodelled in about 1807 in the neo-gothic style by Robert Newton Incledon (1761–1846), husband of Elizabeth Beavis and eldest son of Benjamin Incledon (1730–1796) of Pilton House, Pilton, near Barnstaple, an antiquarian and genealogist and Recorder of the Borough of Barnstaple (1758–1796). It was demolished during his lifetime and today only one of the large gatehouse survives, since converted into a farmhouse known as Ivy Lodge.
