= Incledon (surname) =

Incledon is a surname. Notable people with the surname include,

- Benjamin Incledon (1730–1796), English antiquarian
- Charles Incledon (1763–1826, English singer
- Marjorie Incledon (1891–1973), English artist
- Robert Incledon (1676–1758), English lawyer and Mayor of Barnstaple
