= Yeotown, Goodleigh =

Historic estate in Devon, England

Coordinates: 51.0813°N 4.0446°W

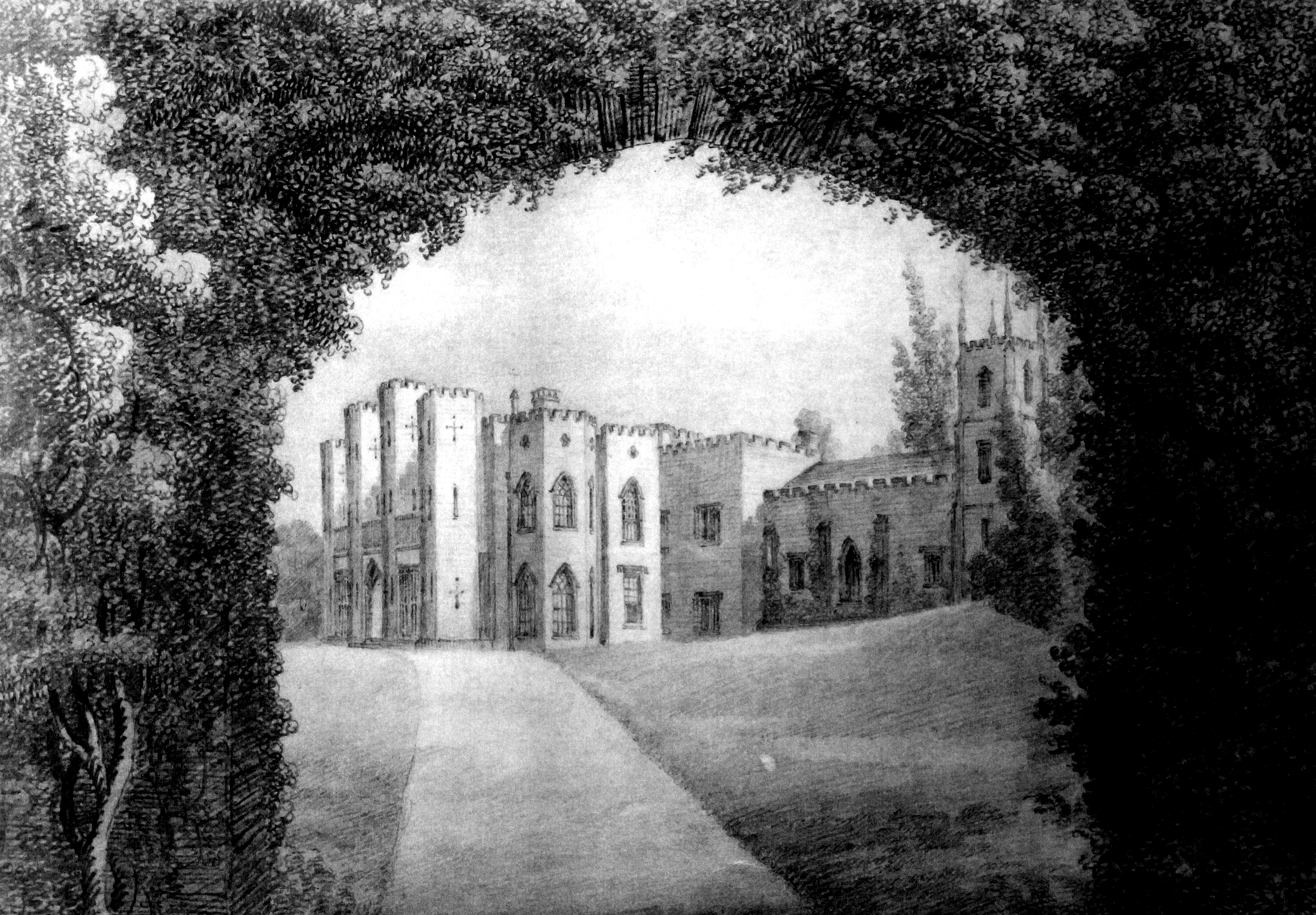
Yeotown House, Goodleigh. Remodelled in neo-gothic style circa 1807 by Robert Newton Incledon (1761-1846) and demolished within his lifetime

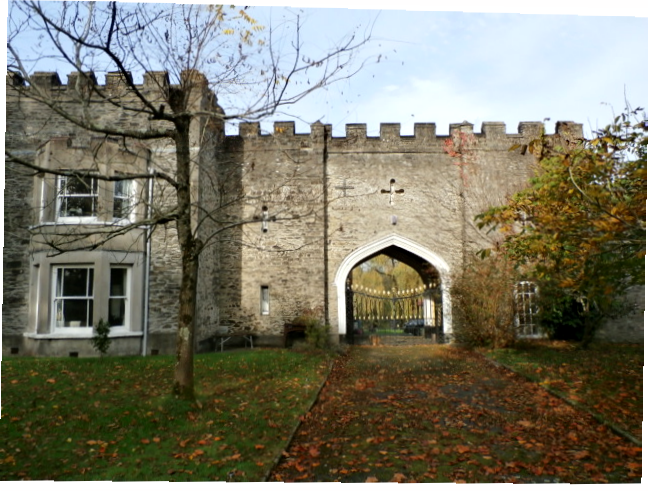
Neo-gothic gatehouse of demolished Yeotown House. The crenellated block at left with projecting windows is a later addition. Now known as Ivy Lodge, a farmhouse

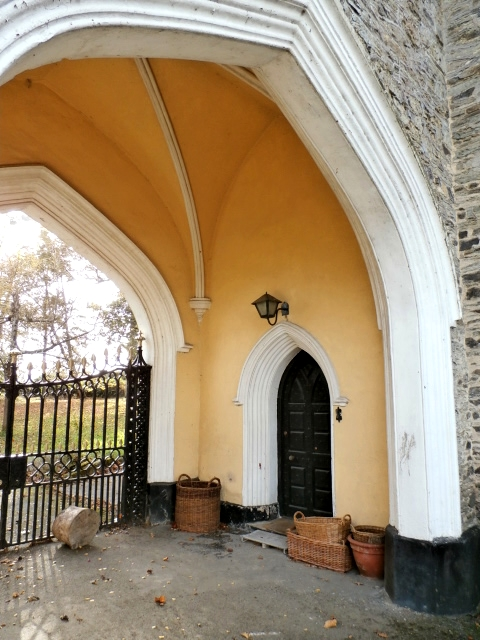
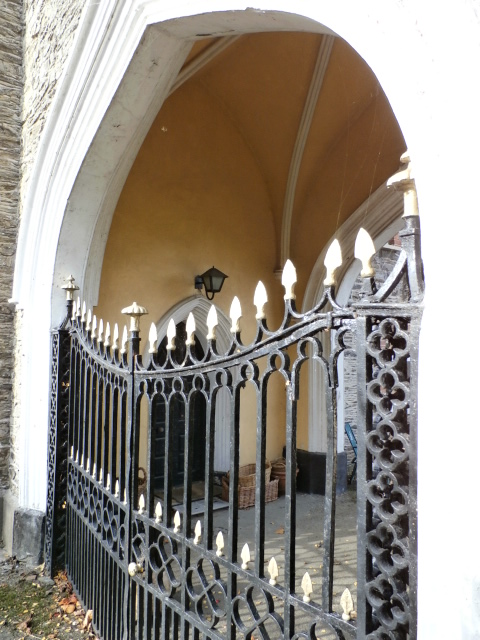
Detailed views of Gatehouse, Yeotown

Yeotown was a historic estate situated in the parish of Goodleigh, North Devon, about 1 1/2 miles north-east of the historic centre of Barnstaple. The mansion house was remodelled in about 1807 in the neo-gothic style by Robert Newton Incledon (1761-1846), eldest son of Benjamin Incledon (1730-1796) of Pilton House, Pilton, near Barnstaple, an antiquarian and genealogist and Recorder of the Borough of Barnstaple (1758–1796). It was demolished during his lifetime and today only one of the large gatehouse survives, since converted into a farmhouse known as Ivy Lodge. The surviving drawing of the house in the collection of the North Devon Athaneum in Barnstaple shows a large chapel, or small church, with a tall square three-storied pinnacled tower (presumably as is conventional at the west end) attached to the house.

== Location ==
The mansion house was situated in the sequestered wooded valley of the small River Yeo, about 1 mile south-west of the village of Goodleigh. Near to what Gribble (1830) called "Yeotown Lodge" (now Ivy Lodge) on the road from Goodleigh to Barnstaple is situated the stone marker of the eastern boundary of the parish of Barnstaple.

== Ownership ==
The earliest recorded owners of the estate were the Beavis family. Henry Beavis was Mayor of Barnstaple in 1738 and 1751; he was of a family who owned the manor of Clyst Satchville, Devon. His son, Col Henry Beavis (1736-1813), owner of the large estate of Kentisbury Barton. Col Beavis had no children of his own and adopted a daughter, Elizabeth, who became his sole heiress and the wife of Robert Newton Incledon (1761-1846). Incledon lived at Yeotown House with his wife, redesigning the front. The mansion was however demolished, for unknown reasons, during his lifetime.

=== Abandonment & demolition ===
The historian of Barnstaple Joseph Gribble wrote in 1830 concerning the River Yeo: "This stream... forms one of the most prominent objects of attraction from the late splendid but now desolate and forsaken mansion of Yeotown".

Today there survives only one of the large imposing castellated gate house lodges, with two square towers either side of the tall gothic arched entrance way, to which was later added a farmhouse with crenellated gable-end to match with bay-window. It is now a grade II listed building known as Ivy Lodge.
