= Hawkridge =

Hawkridge may refer to two places in England:

- Hawkridge, Somerset
- Hawkridge, Chittlehampton, North Devon

== See also ==
- Hawkeridge, Wiltshire
