= Recorder of Barnstaple =

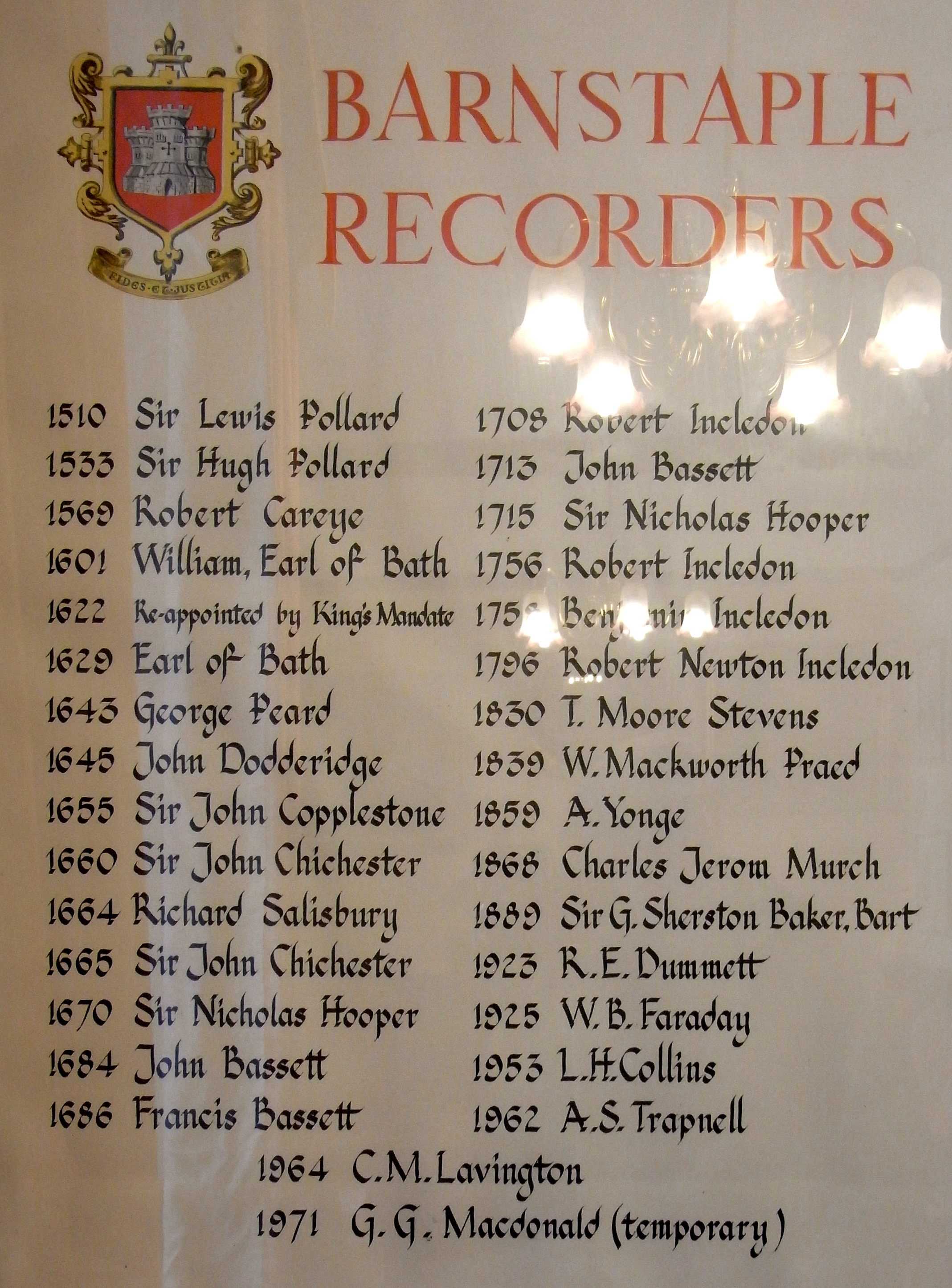
Framed list of the Recorders of the Borough of Barnstaple, displayed in the mayor's Parlour, Barnstaple

The recorder of Barnstaple was a recorder, a form of senior judicial officer, usually an experienced barrister, within the jurisdiction of the Borough of Barnstaple in Devon. He was usually a member of the local North Devonshire gentry. The position of recorder of any borough carried a great deal of prestige and power of patronage. The recorder of a borough was often entrusted by the mayor and corporation to nominate its Members of Parliament, as was the case with Sir Hugh I Pollard (fl. 1536, 1545), Recorder of Barnstaple, who in 1545 nominated the two MP's to represent the Borough of Barnstaple. In the 19th century a recorder was the sole judge who presided at a Quarter Sessions of a Borough, a "Court of Record", and was a barrister of at least five years' standing. He fixed the dates of the Quarter Sessions at his own discretion "as long as he holds it once every quarter of a year", or more often if he deemed fit.

== List of recorders of Barnstaple ==
- 1545-?: Sir Hugh I Pollard (fl. 1536, 1545) lord of the manor of King's Nympton in Devon, Sheriff of Devon in 1535/6 was in 1545 appointed Recorder of Barnstaple.
- 1560-?:Robert III Carey (c.1515-1587), lord of the manor of Clovelly in North Devon, was Member of Parliament for Barnstaple, Devon, in October 1553 and served as Sheriff of Devon in 1555–56. He served as Recorder of Barnstaple after 1560. Along with several other members of the Devonshire gentry then serving as magistrates he died of gaol fever at the Black Assize of Exeter 1587. His large monument survives in Clovelly Church.
- John II Dodderidge (1610–1659) of Bremridge in the parish of South Molton, near Barnstaple, entered Middle Temple on 26 June 1629 and was called to the bar on 19 May 1637. He was elected MP for Barnstaple in 1646 and 1654, for Bristol in 1656 and for Devon also in 1656, and chose to sit for Devon, but was prevented by Oliver Cromwell from taking his seat. In 1655 he was appointed recorder of Bristol. Subsequently he became Recorder of Barnstaple, a position of significant honour, having left pieces of plate to the corporation of Bristol. He became a bencher of the Middle Temple in 1658 and published The Opinions of Sundry Antiquaries ... Touching the Antiquity, Power, Order, State, Manner, Persons and Proceedings of the High-Court of Parliament in England.
- 1710/13-?: Sir Nicholas II Hooper (1654-1731) of Fullabrook and Raleigh, Pilton, Near Barnstaple, a lawyer who served as Tory Member of Parliament for Barnstaple 1695-1715. He entered the Inner Temple in 1671 and was called to the bar in 1678 and appointed Bencher in 1700 and later Serjeant-at-Law. He was appointed Queen’s Serjeant 1702–14 and King’s Serjeant 1714, which office he held until his death. He was knighted 7 June 1713. In 1687 he was appointed Deputy-Recorder, and by 1710/13 Recorder of Barnstaple.
- 1758-1796: Benjamin Incledon (1730-1796) (pronounced "Ingledon") of Pilton House, Pilton, near Barnstaple, an antiquarian and genealogist. He served as Recorder of Barnstaple from 1758 to 1796.
- Thomas Moore-Stevens (1782-1832), of Vielston, Buckland Brewer, later of Cross, Little Torrington, "Recorder of Exeter, Barnstaple, and Torrington". He was the son of Rev. Thomas Moore (1740-1802), vicar of Bishops Tawton by his wife (whom he had married in 1779) Christiana Stevens (1743-1828), sister of Henry Stevens (1739-1802). He succeeded to Cross and other property under an entail, and to Winscott under the will of Elizabeth Clevland, daughter and heir of Richard Stevens of Winscott and wife of John II Clevland (1734–1817), of Tapeley. He adopted the name and arms of Stevens, by royal licence dated 12 July 1817, on the death of John Clevland (1734-1817), 2nd husband of Elizabeth Stevens, as a condition of her will. He was of Winscott, BA Balliol College, Oxford, 1803, a barrister of the Middle Temple, and Recorder of Exeter, as recorded on his mural monument in Little Torrington Church. He married in 1821 Sophia Le Marchant (1798-1860), younger daughter of Rev. Joshua Le Marchant of Guernsey, and had two daughters, Sophia and Louisa, who married Frederick Haworth of Kensington, Middlesex. Sophia Stevens's diaries between the years 1817-1836 are held at the North Devon Record Office in Barnstaple (ref:A 251), but a large gap exists around the time of her husband's death. He was the presumptive heir and next-of-kin to John Rolle, 1st Baron Rolle (d.1842), (of the second creation of that title) his mother Christiana Stevens (d.1828) having been first cousin of John, Lord Rolle, who had only sisters and no children of his own. Lord Rolle however disposed of his property elsewhere under his will. Thomas Stevens died by suicide, as is recorded in the death notices in the 1832 Annual Register:

"14 Jan. At his seat, Cross, near Torrington, Thomas Stevens, Esq. recorder of Exeter, Barnstaple, and Torrington, and a major in the North Devon regiment of Yeomanry cavalry. Educated for the bar, he early displayed talents of a superior order, and in 1826 he was elected by the chamber of Exeter to fill the honourable and responsible office of recorder of that city. On Monday, January 9, Mr. Stevens sat in the court of quarter sessions in Barnstaple; and on Tuesday, at the quarter sessions in South Molton; and, on each of those days, he complained of indisposition in his head. A tumultuous assemblage of people at Torrington on the following days, called forth his active exertions both as a magistrate and an officer, and probably increased the excitement which disease had previously begotten in his mind. On Friday evening he wrote a letter to a gentleman, which bore strong indications of great mental agitation. In this perturbed state he retired to his room on the evening of Friday. In the morning (...) was heard from the dressing room, which induced Mrs. Stevens to hasten thither; and, on entering she caught her husband in her arms, deluged in blood flowing in torrents from a wound inflicted in his throat, which caused his death within a very short period".

== List of deputy recorders of Barnstaple ==
- Robert Incledon (1676–1758) of Pilton House, Pilton, near Barnstaple, a lawyer of New Inn, London, a Clerk of the Peace for Devon, and Deputy Recorder of Barnstaple and was twice Mayor of Barnstaple, in 1712 and 1721. In 1713 as mayor he supervised the building of the Mercantile Exchange (now known as Queen Anne's Walk, a grade I listed building ) on Barnstaple Quay, as recorded on the building by a contemporary brass plaque and sculpture of his armorials. He built Pilton House in 1746.

== Sources ==
- Besly, Joseph, Memorials of Barnstaple, Barnstaple, 1830, pp. 407–8, regarding duties and appointment of Recorder of Barnstaple.
