= Hawkridge, Chittlehampton =

Historic estate in north Devon, England

Coordinates: 51°00′46″N 3°58′50″W

Hawkridge
- Historic Estate and Farmhouse
- Interactive map of Hawkridge
- Country: England
- County: Devon
- Parish: Chittlehampton

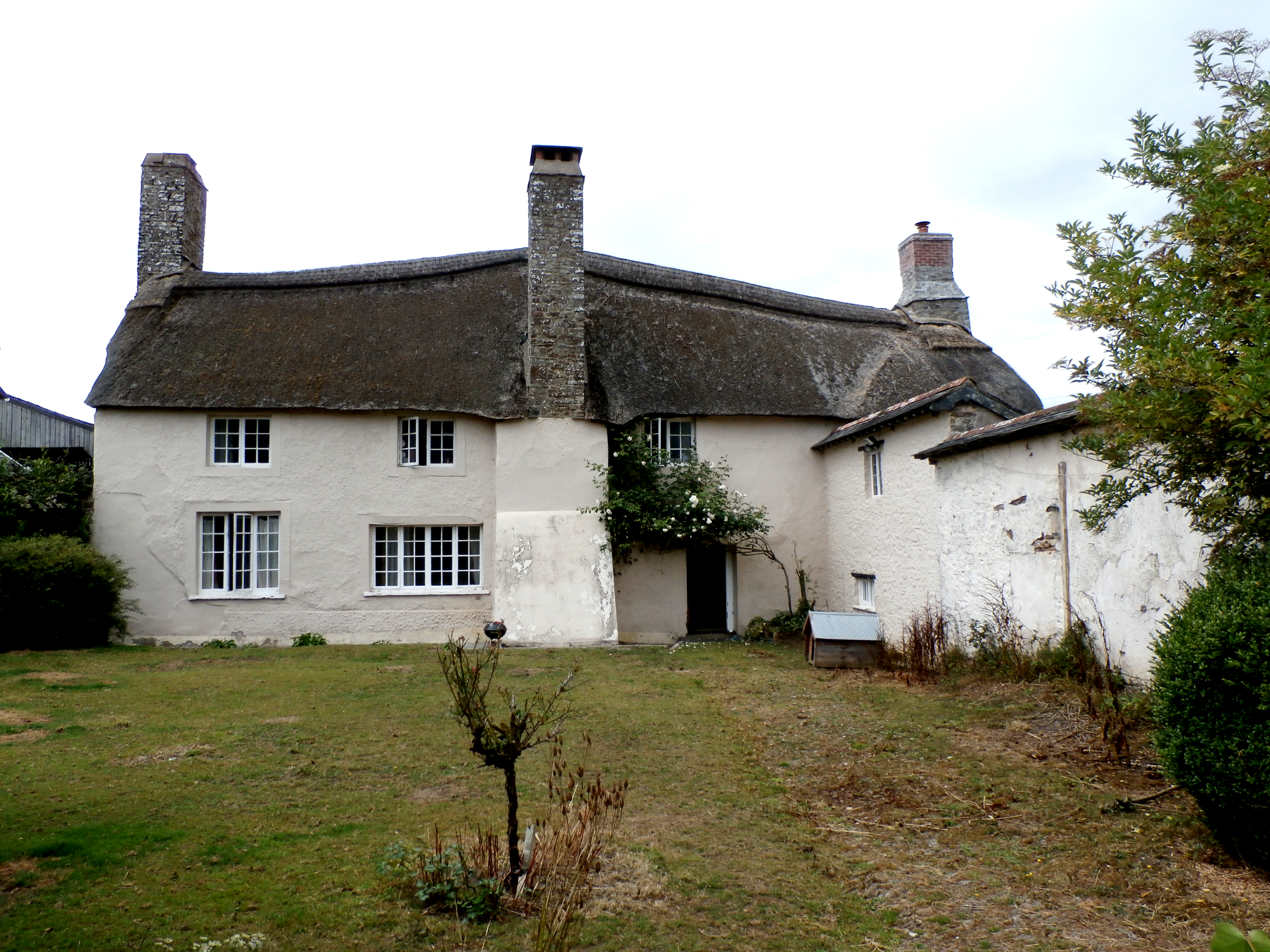
Hawkridge Barton, Chittlehampton

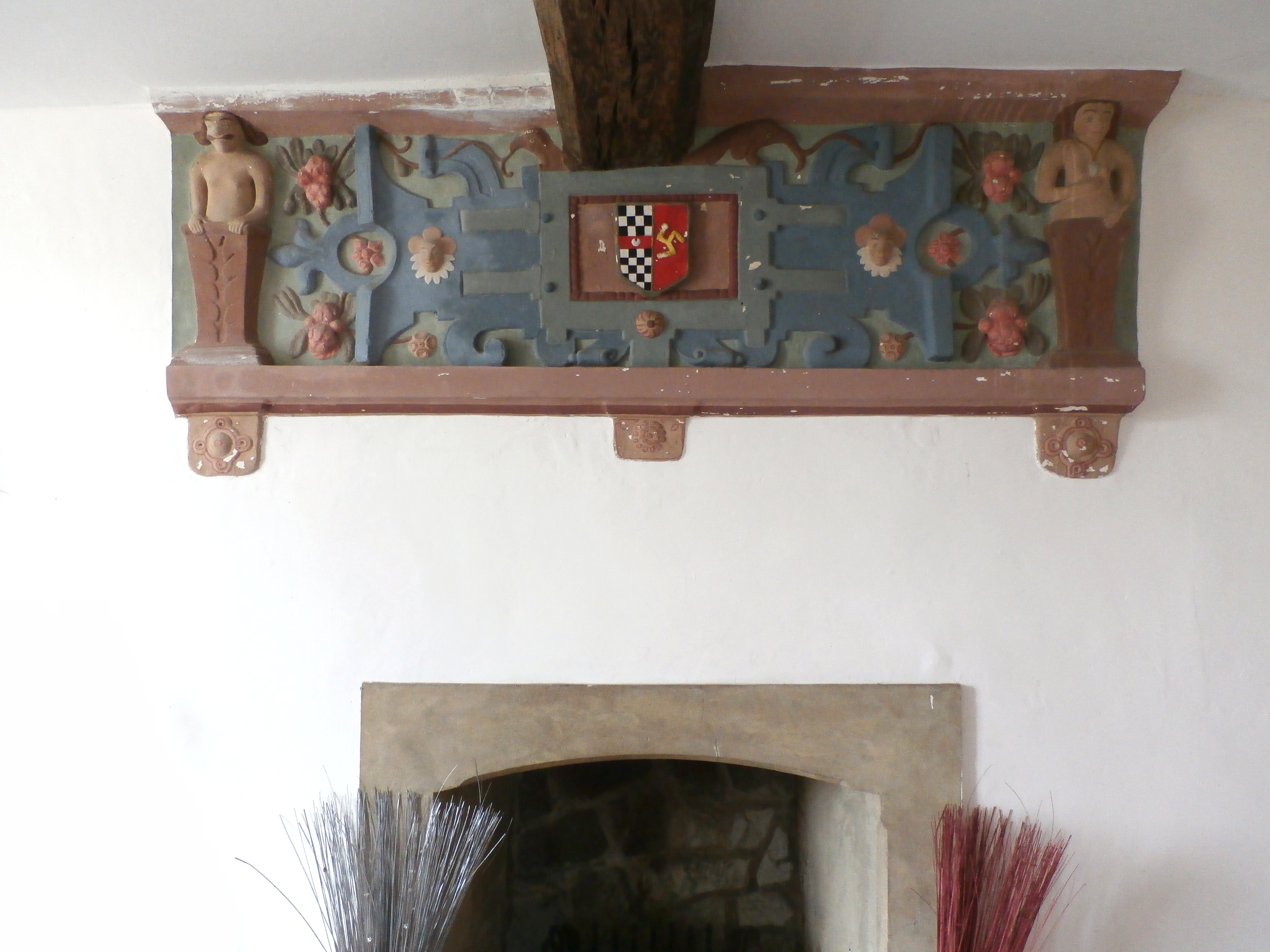
Plaster heraldic overmantel at Hawkridge Barton representing the 1615 marriage of Baldwin Acland and Elizabeth Tremayne

Hawkridge in the parish of Chittlehampton in North Devon, England, is an historic estate, anciently the seat of a junior branch of the Acland family which originated at nearby Acland, in the parish of Landkey and later achieved great wealth and prominence as the Acland Baronets of Killerton, near Exeter. The former mansion house is today a farmhouse known as Hawkridge Barton, a grade II* listed building. The Devon historian Hoskins (1959) stated of Hawkridge: "Externally there is nothing remarkable except a decaying avenue of ancient walnuts, so often the first indication of a 16th or 17th century mansion". The interior contains a fine plaster heraldic overmantel showing the arms of Acland impaling Tremayne, representing the 1615 marriage of Baldwin Acland (1593–1659) of Hawkridge and Elizabeth Tremayne.

== Descent ==
=== de Hawkridge ===
The earliest known holders of the estate was the de Hawkridge family, which took its surname from the estate, as the Devon historian Tristram Risdon (died 1640) stated: "Hawkeridge hath had lords so named". According to the Devon historian Sir William Pole (died 1635), the arms of this family were: Gules, a bend undée argent in sinister point a hawk on a perch or. Nothing is known about this family other than that the last in the male line was William de Hawkridge, who left a daughter and heiress named Alicia de Hawkridge, who married John Akelane (Acland) of Acland, in the parish of Landkey, North Devon, about 4 miles north of Hawkridge.

=== Acland ===
Arms of Acland: Chequy argent and sable, a fesse gules

After Hawkridge passed into the Acland family by the marriage of John Akelane to Alicia Hawkridge, it was held together with Acland in Landkey by seven generations of the family (see Acland, Landkey for details) until it was given by John Akeland of Akeland, who had married Elizabeth Cruwys (or Cruse), to his second son, Anthony.

==== Anthony Acland (died 1568) ====
Anthony Acland (died 1568) was the second son of John Acland of Acland, who gave him the estate of Hawkridge, where he established his own branch of the family. Anthony married Agnes, a daughter of John Courtenay (1466–1510) of Molland, North Devon, by his wife Joan Brett, the sister of Robert Brett (died 1540), who was lord of the manor of Pilland in the parish of Pilton. Courtenay was descended from the Courtenay family of Powderham, descended from Hugh Courtenay, 2nd Earl of Devon (1303–1377).

Anthony's second son was James Acland who established his own branch of the family in the parish of Goodleigh, about 5 miles north of Hawkridge; monuments to which family survive in Goodleigh Church.

==== Baldwin Acland (1533–1572) ====
Anthony's eldest son and heir was Baldwin Acland (1533–1572). He married Gertrude Stapleton (died 1604), daughter and heiress of George Stapleton of Rempstone, Nottinghamshire, by whom he had four sons and one daughter. Gertrude (possibly a sister of Anthony Stapleton (c.1514–1574), MP) inherited the manor of Rempstone from her cousin Faith Stapleton, daughter and heiress of Henry Stapleton of Rempstone, and sold it to Gabriel Armstrong. The arms of Stapleton of Rempstone (Argent, two bends wavy sable) are the same as the ancient arms of Stapledon of Annery, Monkleigh in North Devon, as visible on the monument of Walter de Stapledon Bishop of Exeter in Exeter Cathedral.

Baldwin's eldest surviving son was Anthony Acland of Hawkridge (see below) and his second son was John Acland (died 1641), of the parish of St Olave in the City of Exeter, a merchant who was Mayor of Exeter in 1627 and founded his own prominent but short-lived branch of the Acland family who were merchants in that city. His own second son was John Acland (1615–1674) of Exeter, also Mayor of Exeter (in 1666), but died without surviving male children, leaving two daughters as co-heiresses, both of whom married into the prominent Exeter family of Duck, Margery Acland (1656–1695) having married the lawyer Arthur Duck (1580–1648), MP. The eldest son of John Acland (died 1641) of Exeter was Baldwin Acland (1607–1672), Treasurer of Exeter Cathedral and one of the Worthies of Devon of the biographer John Prince (1643–1723), whose wife was his niece.

==== Anthony Acland (1568–1614) ====
Anthony Acland (1568–1614) of Hawkridge was Baldwin's eldest son and heir, aged only four at the death of his father. His mother Gertrude remarried to Leonard Yeo (fl. 1586) of North Petherwin, Devon, by whom she had a further son Edmond Yeo, whose mural monument survives in Chittlehampton Church, who married Elizabeth Killigrew, daughter of John Killigrew of Arwennack in Cornwall.

Anthony married his step-father's niece, Anna Weekes, the daughter of William Weekes of Honeychurch, Devon, by his wife Arminell Yeo, daughter of John Yeo of Hatherleigh. Their two children were son and heir Baldwin (see below), and a daughter Gertrude, who in 1611 at Chittlehampton married Abell Rolle (born 1583) of the wealthy, influential and widespread Rolle family of Devon.

==== Baldwin Acland (1593–1659) ====
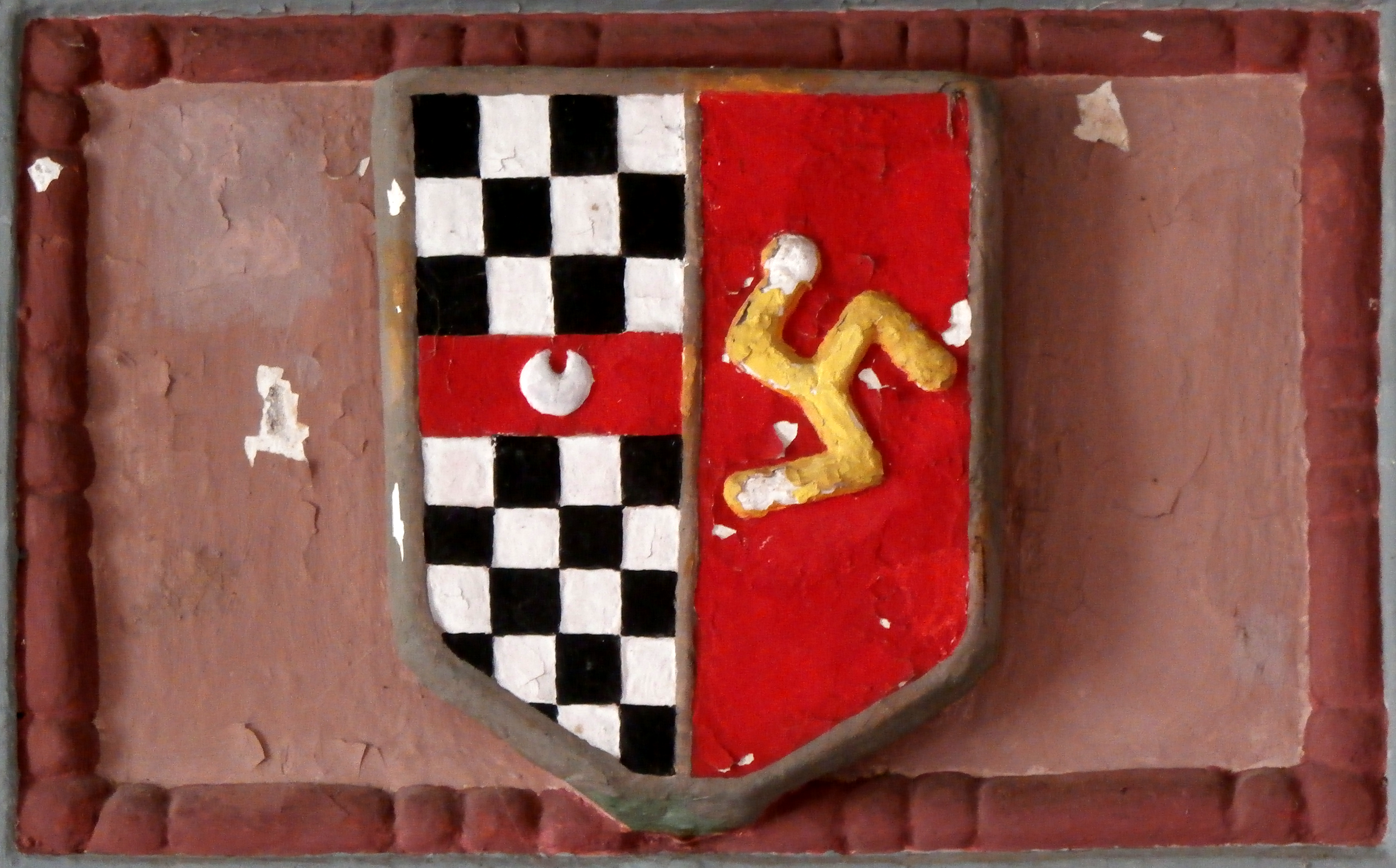
Detail of overmantel at Hawkridge Barton, showing the arms of Acland (with a crescent for difference) impaling Tremayne (Note: The Canting arms of Tremayne are Gules, three dexter arms conjoined at the shoulders and flexed in triangle or the fists clenched argent, from French trois mains ("three hands"))

Anthony's son, Baldwin Acland (1593–1659) married Elizabeth Tremayne at Lamerton in 1615, a year after his father's death. In the "Inner Room", next to the Great Hall at Hawkridge Barton survives a plaster overmantel showing the arms of Acland impaling Tremayne, representing this marriage. (Note: The overmantel consists of "a strapwork cartouche with small heads probably of Cain and Abel to each side flanked by foliage and figures of Adam and Eve, with the serpent above".) Elizabeth was the fifth daughter of Arthur Tremayne (1553–1635) of Collacombe in the parish of Lamerton, Devon, and his wife Mary, a daughter of Admiral Sir Richard Grenville (1542–1591), the famous captain of the Revenge.

==== Arthur Acland (born 1616) ====
Arthur Acland (born 1616) was Baldwin's son and heir. He had four sisters, Mary (born 1617), Anne, Elizabeth (born 1621) and Martha (died young in 1624). The pedigree of Acland of Hawkridge recorded in the Heraldic Visitation of Devon ends in 1620.

=== Chichester/Yeo ===
According to the Lysons' Magna Britannia (1822), Hawkridge was inherited in two moieties by the families of Yeo and Chichester and in about 1785 Charles Chichester "of Bath" sold his moiety to the Yeo's.

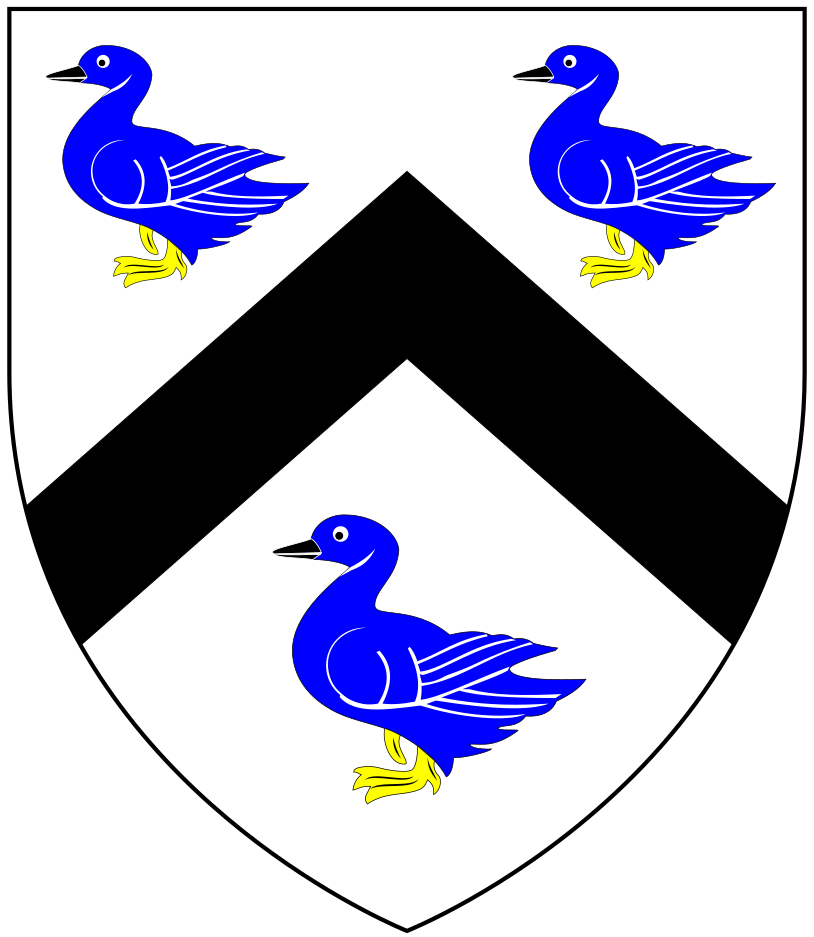
Arms of Yeo: Argent, a chevron sable between three ducks azure. (Note: Per research conducted by Sheila Yeo of the Yeo Society, based on stained glass depictions of Yeo arms in churches of Petrockstowe (Yeo of Heanton Satchville) and Hatherleigh (Yeo of Hatherleigh) both in Devon. The ducks are described as of various breeds by different sources. Heraldic sources give contradictory tinctures: Argent, a chevron between three shovelers sable (Vivian, p.834) and Argent, a chevron between three mallards azure (Pole, p.510). The Yeos quartered the arms of Sachville, Esse, Pyne, Jewe and Brightley.)

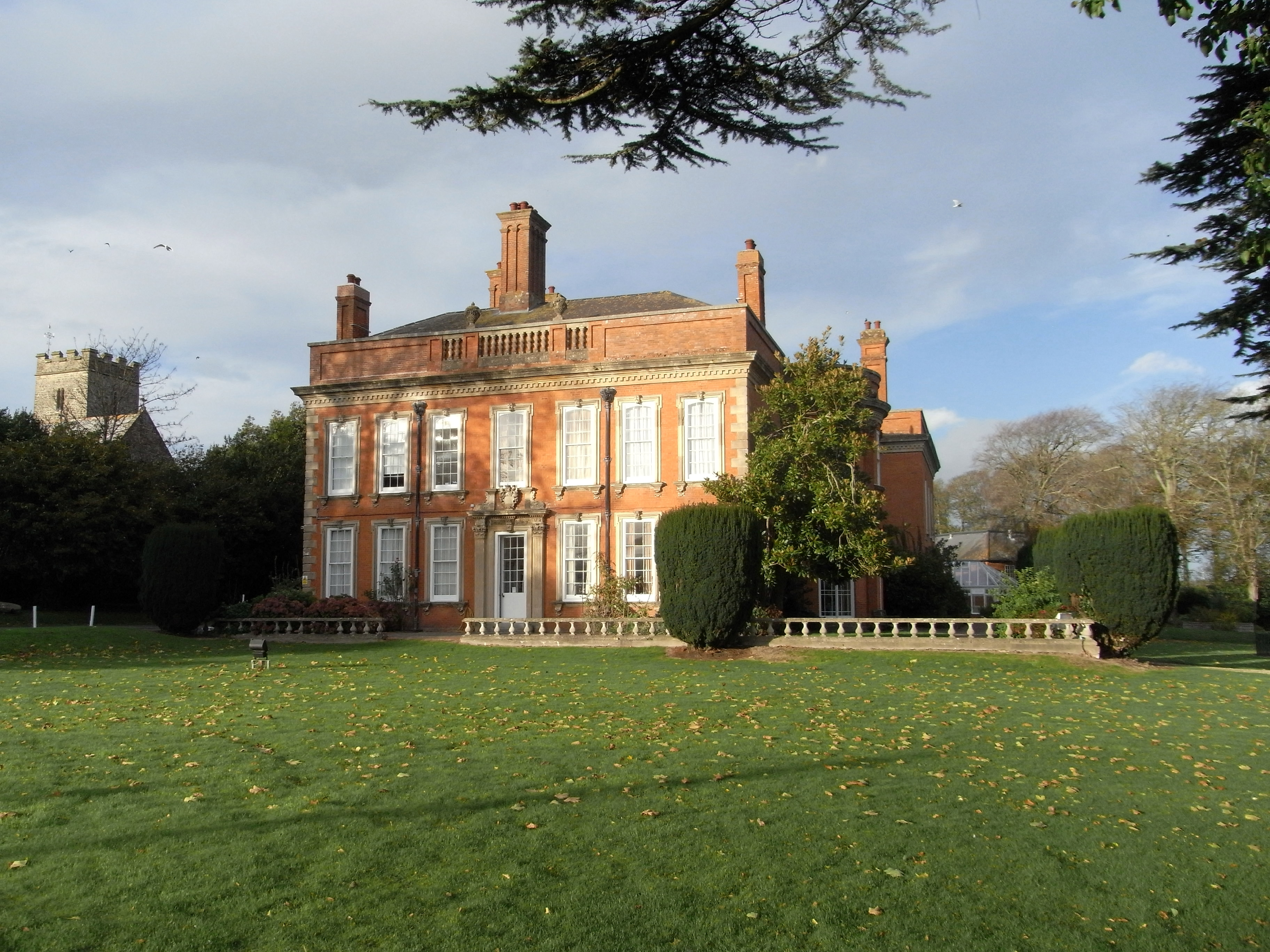
Fremington House, near Barnstaple. Built by Richard Acland (1679–1729), MP for Barnstaple 1708–13, later inherited by Barbor then Yeo

William Mounier Yeo (died 1809), an apothecary of The Mall, Clifton, near Bristol in Gloucestershire, who in his will dated 1809 bequeathed Hawkridge and Hawkridge Wood of 70 acres to trustees with instructions that they should sell the estate and pass the proceeds to his widow for the maintenance and education of his two younger infant sons, Beauple Yeo and George Barbor Roch Yeo. The will referred to: "All that farm with the messuages and tenements thereto belonging situate at Hawkridge in the parish of Chittlehampton in occupation of William Boulfield". He was the son of Rev. Beaple Yeo, Rector of Atherington, Devon, (across the River Taw from Hawkridge) and heir to his cousin Edward Rouse Yeo (1742–1782), (who sold the manor of Huish), MP for Coventry (1774–80). William Mounier Yeo married Phillis Arundell O'Neill (died 1846), only daughter and heiress of Clotworthy O'Neill, of Ireland, by his wife, Mary Arundell, eldest daughter and co-heiress of Thomas Arundell, of Trevelver, in the parish of St. Minver, Cornwall. The eldest son of William Mounier Yeo was William Arundell Yeo (died 1862) who inherited from his mother various properties in Cornwall and from the Barbor family the grand Georgian mansion of Fremington House, built by Richard Acland (1679–1729), MP for Barnstaple 1708–13), and the manor of Fremington, near Barnstaple, North Devon. The ancestry of Richard Acland of Fremington is not well recorded. He was the son of Richard Acland (died 1703), of Fremington, a merchant of Barnstaple, who purchased the Manor of Fremington in 1683 and was nominated Mayor of Barnstaple in 1688, but did not serve. Richard Acland married Susannah Lovering, one of the two daughters and co-heiresses of John Lovering of Hudscott in the parish of Chittlehampton. The other daughter, Dorothy Lovering, whose moiety of her paternal inheritance included Hudscott, married Samuel Rolle, MP, of Hudscott, whom Richard Acland succeeded as MP for Barnstaple.

The Acland family of Barnstaple and Fremington appears to have been a junior branch of the Aclands of Acland, but the exact relationship of the Aclands of Barnstaple to that family is unclear as the Barnstaple "mercantile family" of Acland is not mentioned in the Heraldic Visitations pedigree of the Acland "gentry family". The coat of arms of the two branches is identical, (Chequy argent and sable, a fesse gules) but the crests differ. It cannot be established from surviving records whether the Aclands of Fremington were descended from the Aclands of Hawkridge. The Yeo family did however inherit both Hawkridge and Fremington.

William Arundell Yeo was a Deputy Lieutenant for Devon and was High Sheriff of Devon in 1850 and married Eliza Bernard, daughter of Dr. C. E. Bernard, of Clifton, Bristol. The 1843 tithe award showed the manor of Raleigh (previously owned by Barbor) held between three owners: William Arundell Yeo, 147 acres; Robert Newton Incledon (of Yeotown, Goodleigh), who held 160 acres, together with William Hodge. William Mounier Yeo, as stated in his will, owned a reversionary interest in lands in Fremington and Barnstaple during the life of his aunt Mrs Agnes Roche.

Shortly before 1822 "Mrs. Yeo of Clifton", near Bristol, duly sold Hawkridge to Mr. Owen of Dolton.

Hawkridge appears to have existed subsequently for many years as a tenanted farm. In the 19th century the tenant was the Buckingham family. In 1903 the occupant was William T. Scoynes. In 1948 the occupant was Henry William John Hosking, a farmer.

== Sources ==
- Acland, Anne, A Devon Family: The Story of the Aclands, London and Chichester, 1981
- Andrews, Rev. J.H.B., Chittlehampton, Transactions of the Devon Association, vol.94, 1962, pp. 233–338, p. 250–1
- Vivian, Lt.Col. J.L., (Ed.) The Visitations of the County of Devon: Comprising the Heralds' Visitations of 1531, 1564 & 1620, Exeter, 1895
- Pevsner, Nikolaus & Cherry, Bridget, The Buildings of England: Devon, London, 2004, p. 260
- Pole, Sir William (died 1635), Collections Towards a Description of the County of Devon, Sir John-William de la Pole (ed.), London, 1791
- Risdon, Tristram (d.1640), Survey of Devon, 1811 edition, London, 1811, with 1810 Additions, p. 320, Hawkeridge
