= Incledon =

Historic estate in the parish of Braunton, North Devon, England

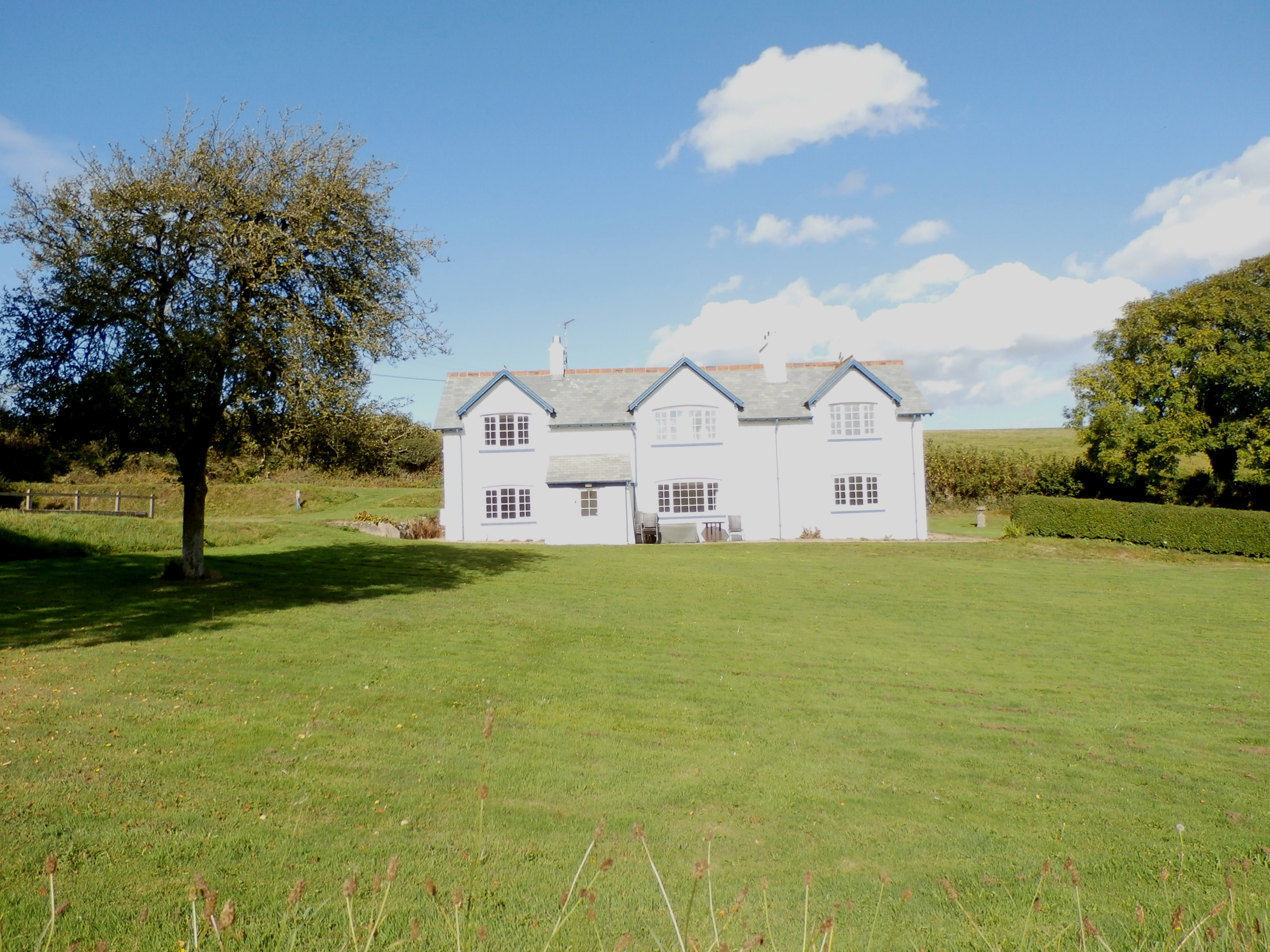
- Location: Braunton, North Devon, England

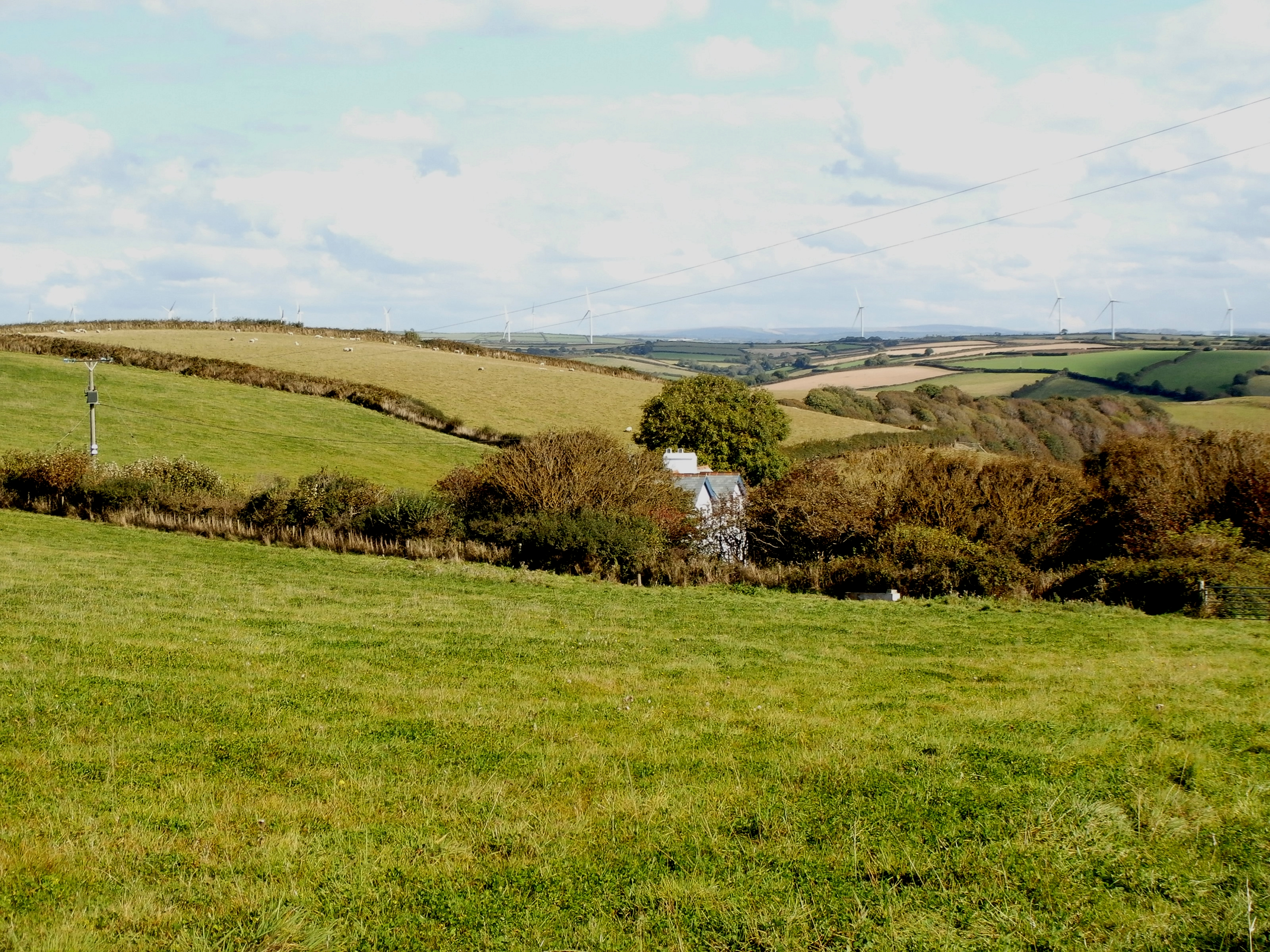
View over Incledon looking eastwards

Incledon in the parish of Braunton, North Devon, England, is an ancient historic estate which gave its name to the locally prominent de Incledon family (later Incledon, pronounced "Ingleton"), first recorded in 1160. It is situated one mile north-west of St Brannock's Church in Braunton. Its relationship to Incledon Hill in the parish of Georgeham, where is situated a modern farmhouse also called Incledon, 1 1/4 miles north-west of Incledon in Braunton, is unclear. In 1319 the Incledon family purchased the adjoining estate of Buckland, and the present Georgian Buckland House, 1/2 mile south-east of Incledon, is still occupied in 2014 by descendants of the Incledon-Webber family.

== Ownership ==
According to Vivian (1895), the first member of the family at Incledon was Robert de Incledon, living in 1160. The Book of Fees (probably 13th century) lists Incledene as held from the Honour of Barnstaple by "Nicholas de Ferariis" (Ferrers) and "Robert de Incledene". The property passed through the Incledon family until the death of John VII Incledon (1702-1746), of Buckland; his only son John Incledon (1741-1741) died an infant, leaving two daughters as his co-heiresses. The elder daughter, Mary (1736-1802), married in 1759 Philip Rogers Webber (1732-1819), JP and DL for Devon; their descendants still own the Incledon property.

== Notable family members ==
Robert Incledon (1676-1758) of Pilton House, Pilton, near Barnstaple, Devon, a lawyer and Mayor of Barnstaple in 1712 and 1721, was father of the antiquarian Benjamin Incledon (1730-1796), of Pilton; Benjamin's granddaughter Frances (living in 1890), was the last of the Incledons.

== Sources ==
- Burke's Genealogical and Heraldic History of the Landed Gentry, 15th Edition, ed. Pirie-Gordon, H., London, 1937, pp. 2390–1, pedigree of Incledon-Webber of Buckland
- Vivian, Lt.Col. J.L., (Ed.) The Visitations of the County of Devon: Comprising the Heralds' Visitations of 1531, 1564 & 1620, Exeter, 1895, pp. 497–9, pedigree of Incledon of Buckland
