= Robert Incledon =

British lawyer

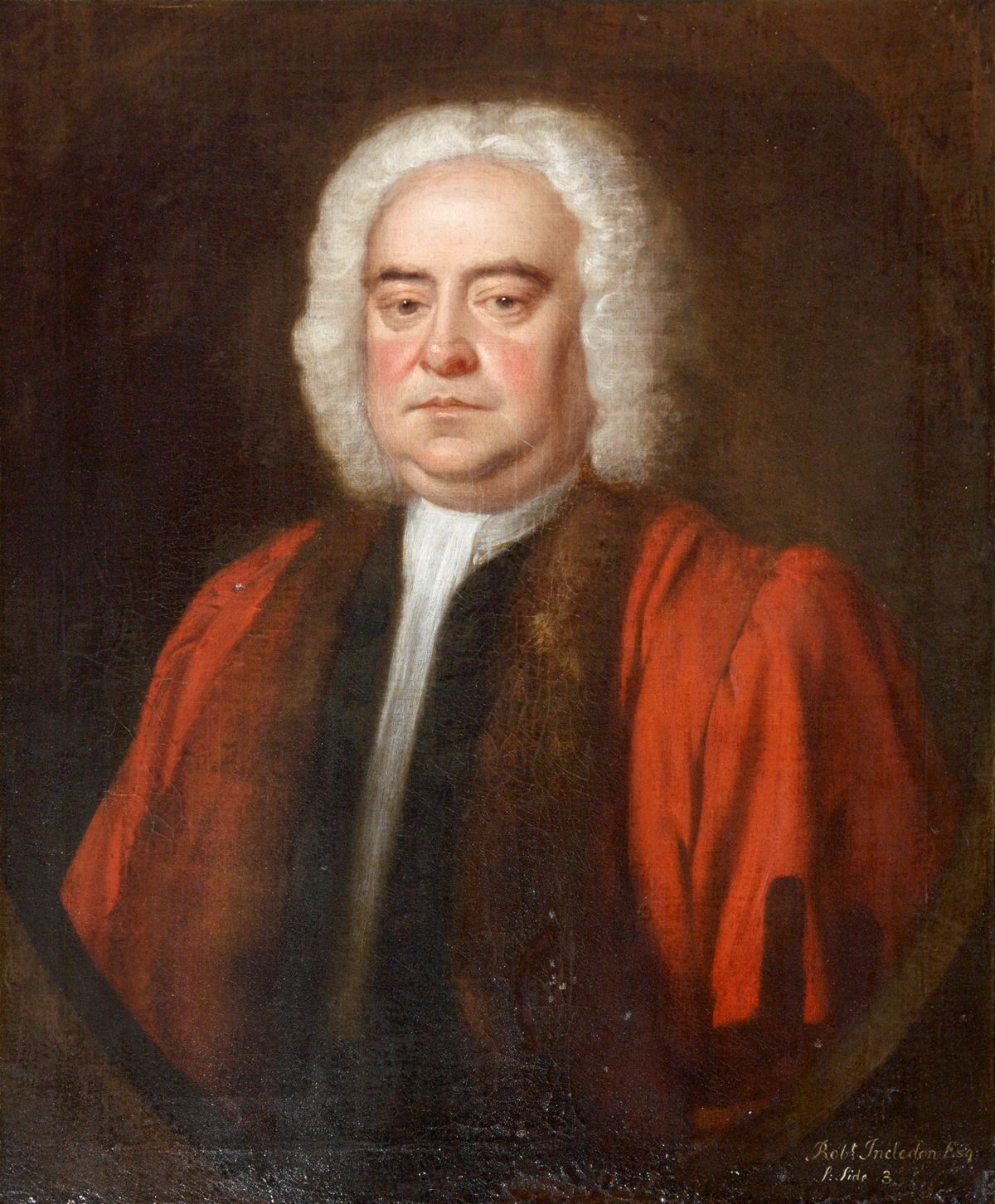
- Robert Incledon (1676-1758) of Pilton House. Portrait by Studio of Thomas Hudson (1701–1779), collection of Barnstaple Town Council, displayed in Barnstaple Guildhall

Mayor of Barnstaple
- In office 1712; 1721

Personal details
- Born: 1676
- Died: 9 December 1758 (aged 81–82)
- Spouse(s): Mary Lethbridge (d. 1709); Penelope Sandford
- Children: 4, including Benjamin

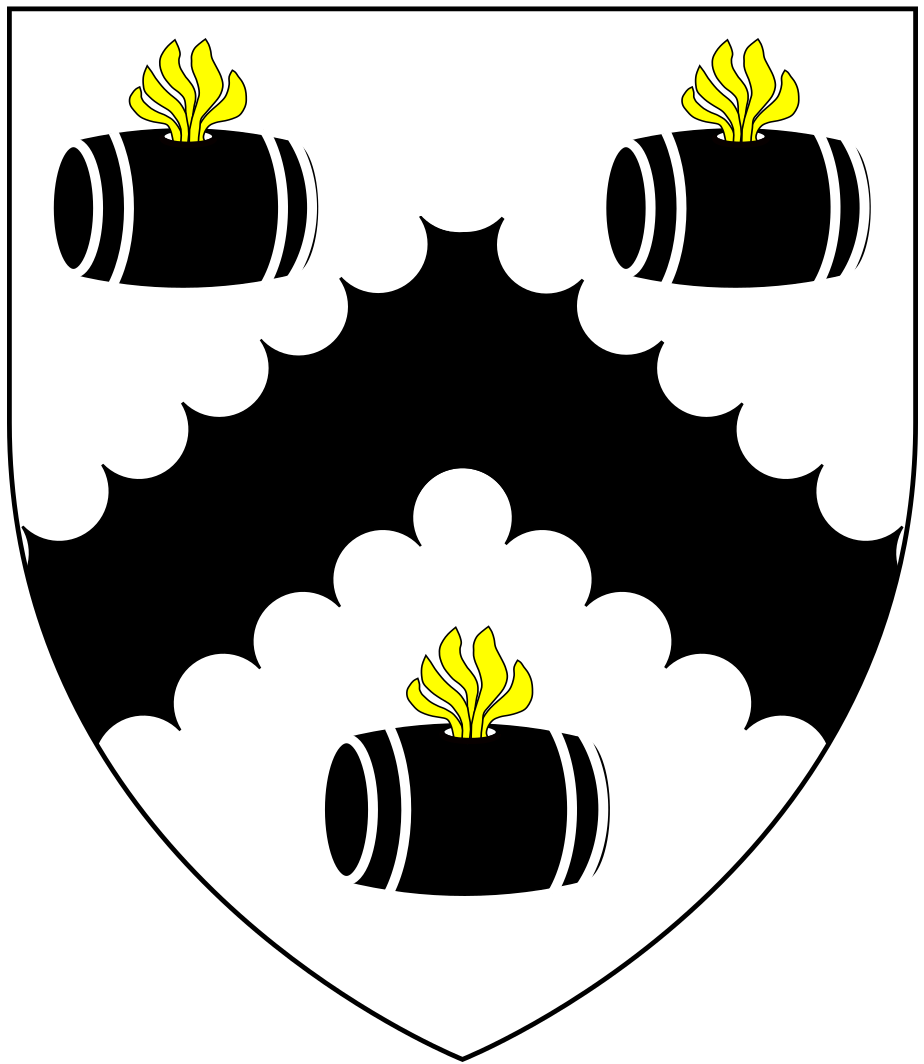
Arms of Incledon of Incledon and Buckland in the parish of Braunton, and of Pilton House, North Devon: Argent, a chevron engrailed between three tuns sable fire issuing from the bung hole proper Quasi-canting arms "incend-tun"

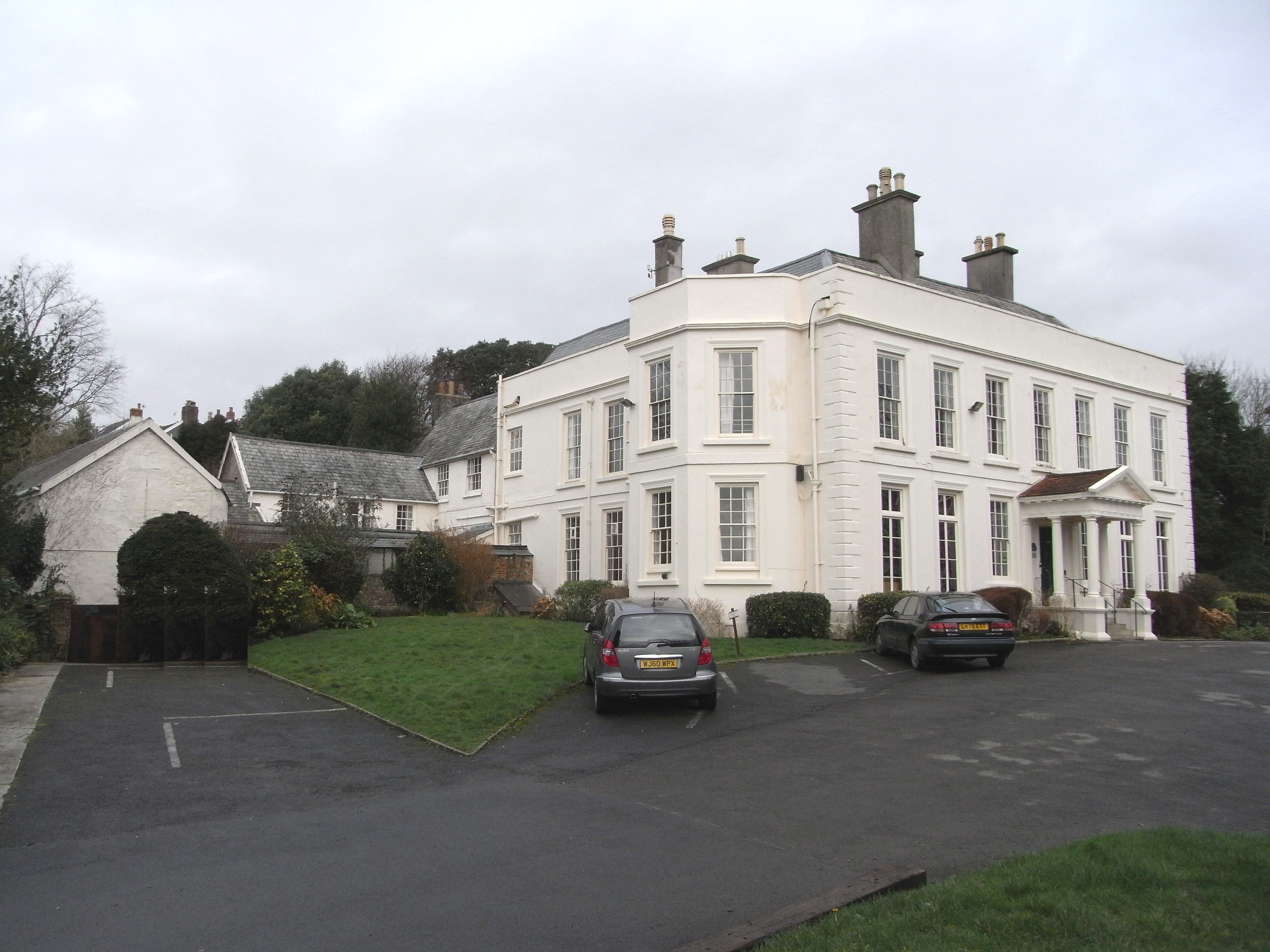
Pilton House, Pilton, near Barnstaple, Devon, built in 1746 by Robert Incledon (1676-1758)

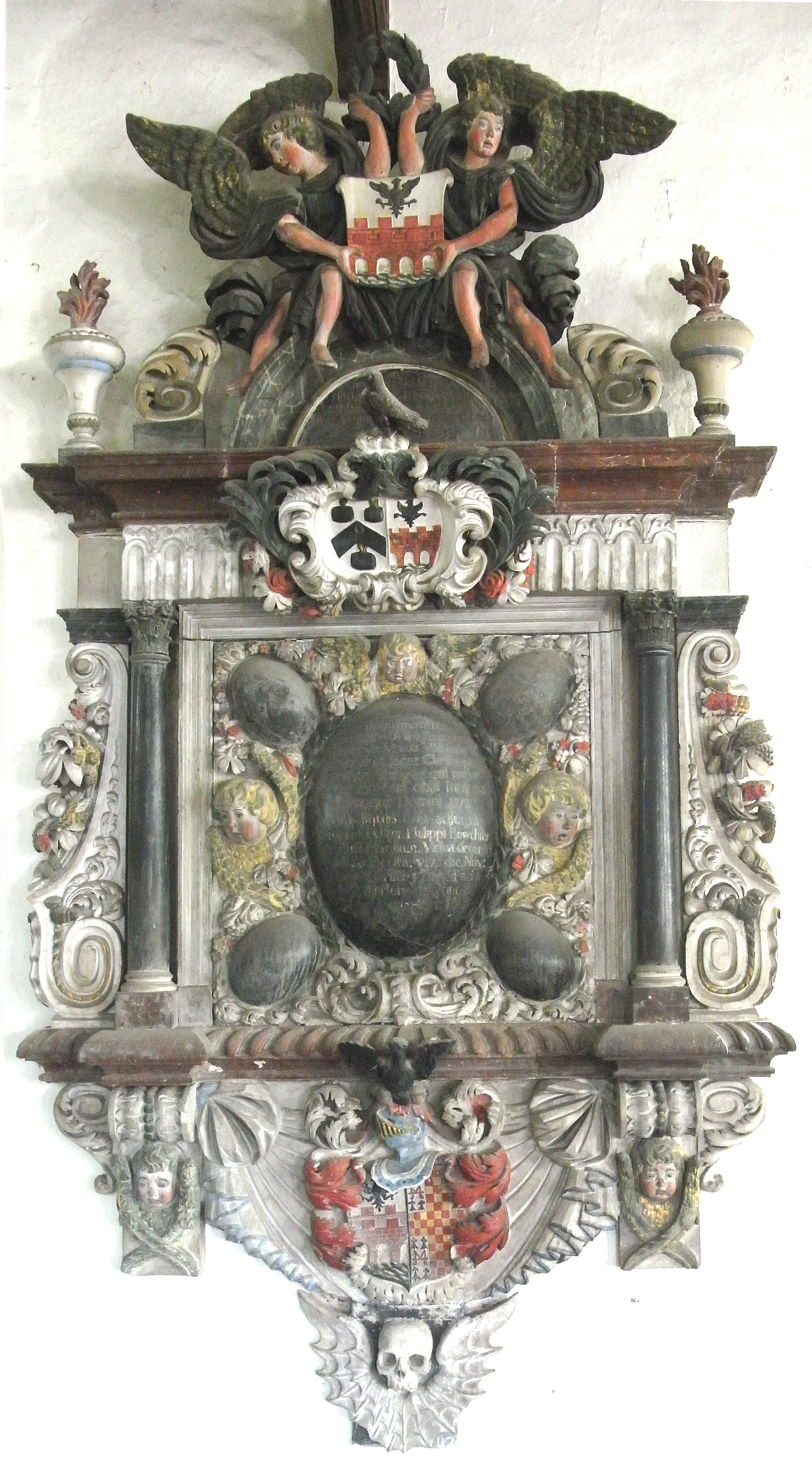
Mural monument in Pilton Church to Christopher Lethbridge (d.1713) of Westaway House, Pilton. Above the inscription are the arms of Robert Incledon (1676-1758) of Pilton House, impaling the arms of his first wife Mary Lethbridge (d.1709), a daughter of Christopher Lethbridge (Argent, over water proper a bridge of five arches embattled gules and over the centre arch a turret in chief an eagle displayed sable charged on the breast with a bezant)

Robert Incledon (1676–1758) of Pilton House, Pilton, near Barnstaple in North Devon, was a lawyer of New Inn, London, a Clerk of the Peace for Devon, Deputy Recorder of Barnstaple and was twice Mayor of Barnstaple, in 1712 and 1721. In 1713 as mayor he supervised the building of the Mercantile Exchange (now known as Queen Anne's Walk, a grade I listed building ) on Barnstaple Quay, as recorded on the building by a contemporary brass plaque and sculpture of his armorials. He built Pilton House in 1746.

== Origins ==
He was a member of the local ancient gentry family of de Incledon (later Incledon, pronounced "Ingleton"), which originated at the estate of Incledon, in the parish of Braunton, North Devon, which family is first recorded in 1160. He was the younger of the two sons of Lewis III Incledon (1636-1699) of Buckland House, Braunton, about 5 miles to the north-west of Pilton, by his second wife, whom he married at nearby Tawstock, Elizabeth Fane (d.1717), daughter of Hon. Robert Fane of Combe Bank, Sevenoaks, Kent, 7th son of Francis Fane, 1st Earl of Westmorland (1580-1629). Tawstock Court was the seat of Henry Bourchier, 5th Earl of Bath (1593-1654), whose wife was Rachell Fane (d.1681), aunt of Elizabeth Fane. Robert's elder brother was Henry Incledon (1671-1736) of Buckland and Incledon, who inherited the paternal estates, and whose ornate monument survives in Braunton Church.

== Builds Mercantile Exchange ==
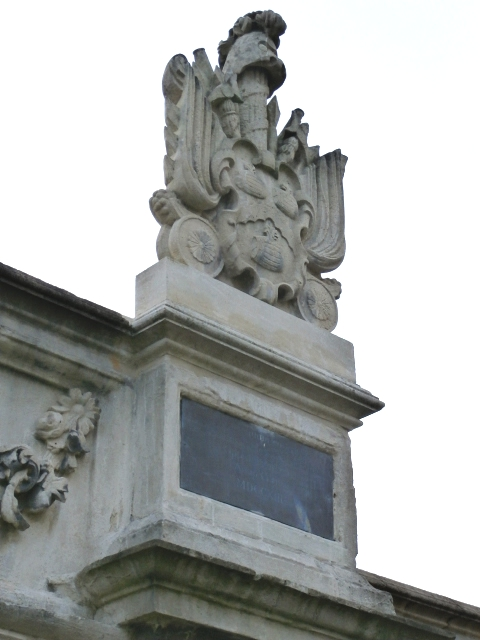
Arms and brass tablet relating to Robert Incledon on Queen Anne's Walk, Barnstaple, the construction of which he supervised in 1713

During his first mayoralty of the Borough of Barnstaple (1712–13) he was responsible for supervising the building of the Mercantile Exchange, a grade I listed building now known as Queen Anne's Walk, on Barnstaple Quay, as is recorded on the east parapet of the building by a sculpture of his armorials and a contemporary brass plaque inscribed in Latin as follows:

Faciendum curavit Robertus Incledon Generosus Oppidi Praefectus Anno Christi MDCCXIII ("Robert Incledon, Esquire, Prefect (i.e. Mayor) of this town, supervised the making. 1713")

Above is a plumed helm placed on a fasces, part of an antique trophy of arms.

== Marriages and children ==
Robert Incledon married twice:

- Firstly to Mary Lethbridge (d.1709), daughter of Christopher Lethbridge (d.1713) of Westaway House, Pilton, the latter of whose "big and sumptuous" mural monument survives in Pilton Church, by his wife Margaret Bowchier, daughter and heiress of Philip Bowchier (d.1687) of Westaway. At the base of the monument are shown impaled by Lethbridge the arms of the family of his wife Margaret Bowchier, a daughter of Philip Bowchier: Argent, a cross chequy gules and or between four water bougets gules each between four ermine spots. These are a differenced version of the arms of Bourchier, Earls of Bath, of nearby Tawstock Court: Argent, a cross engrailed gules between four water bougets sable. The Bourchier Earls of Bath (which name was spelled historically in various ways) died out in the male line in 1654 on the death of the 5th Earl. Philip Bowchier (d.1687) was the son of Rev. Roger Bowchier, vicar of Pilton during the Civil War. It is not known what relationship if any the Bowchiers of Westaway were to the Bourchiers of Tawstock. childless.

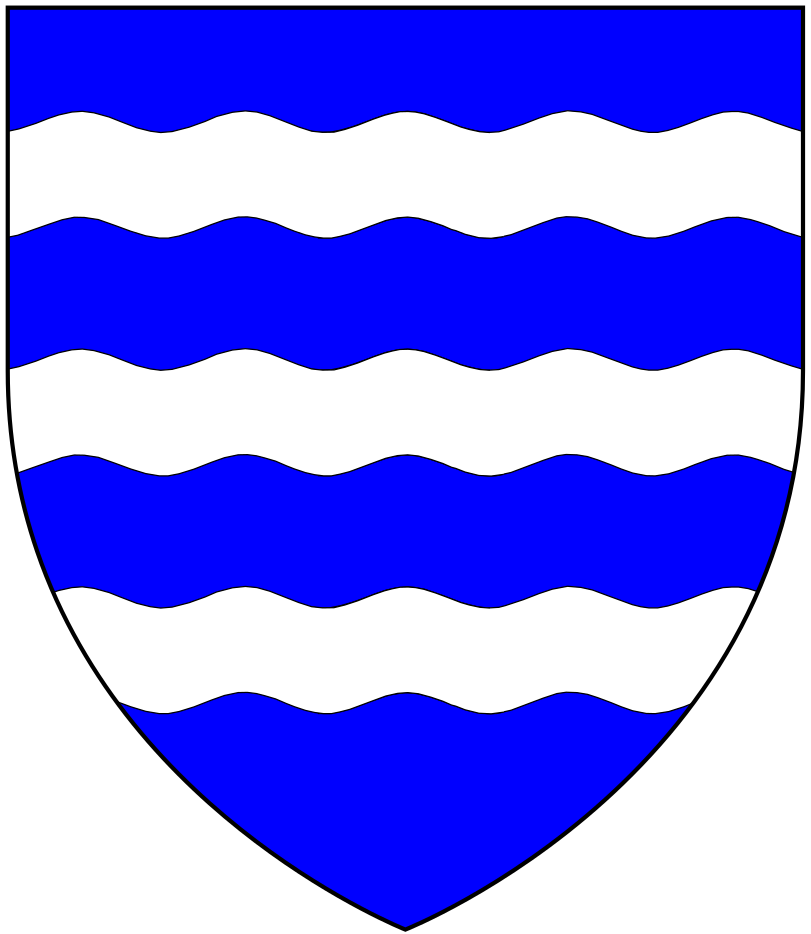
Arms of Sandford: Azure, three bars wavy argent, as seen atop monument to Robert Incledon

- Secondly to Penelope Sandford, daughter of John Sandford of Nynehead in Somerset, by whom he had issue:
  - James Incledon (d.1741), eldest son, who pre-deceased his father and died unmarried.
  - Benjamin Incledon (1730-1796), of Pilton House, 2nd and eldest surviving son and heir to his father. Known as "The Antiquary", he was a genealogist of the ancient gentry families of Devon and historian of the ancient Borough of Barnstaple. He served in the honourable position of Recorder of Barnstaple (1758–1796). He married Margaret Newton (d.1803), second daughter and co-heiress of John Newton of Tiverton. She died at The Castle, Barnstaple, on 8 September 1803.
  - Amy Incledon (1721-1782), eldest daughter, who in 1747 at Pilton married Charles Chichester (1723-1798) of Hall, Bishop's Tawton, Devon. Their eldest son and heir Charles Chichester (1750-1835) married Henrietta Webber (d.1835), 7th daughter of Philip Rogers Webber (1732-1819) of Buckland House, by his marriage to Robert Incledon's great-great-niece Mary Incledon (1736-1802), heiress of Buckland House.
  - Lucy Incledon (born 1724), 2nd daughter, who in 1760 at Milton Damerel married Peregrine Courtenay (1720-1785) "of Raleigh" (possibly Raleigh, Pilton, adjacent to Pilton House), 3rd son of Sir William Courtenay, 2nd Baronet (1675-1735) of Powderham, without children.

== Death ==
He died and was buried on 9 December 1758 in Pilton Church. He is commemorated twice in Pilton Church: by his own monument and by the depiction of the arms of Incledon impaling Lethbridge, he is commemorated on the "big and sumptuous" mural monument surviving in Pilton Church to his father-in-law Christopher Lethbridge (d.1713) of Westaway House, Pilton.

== Monument ==
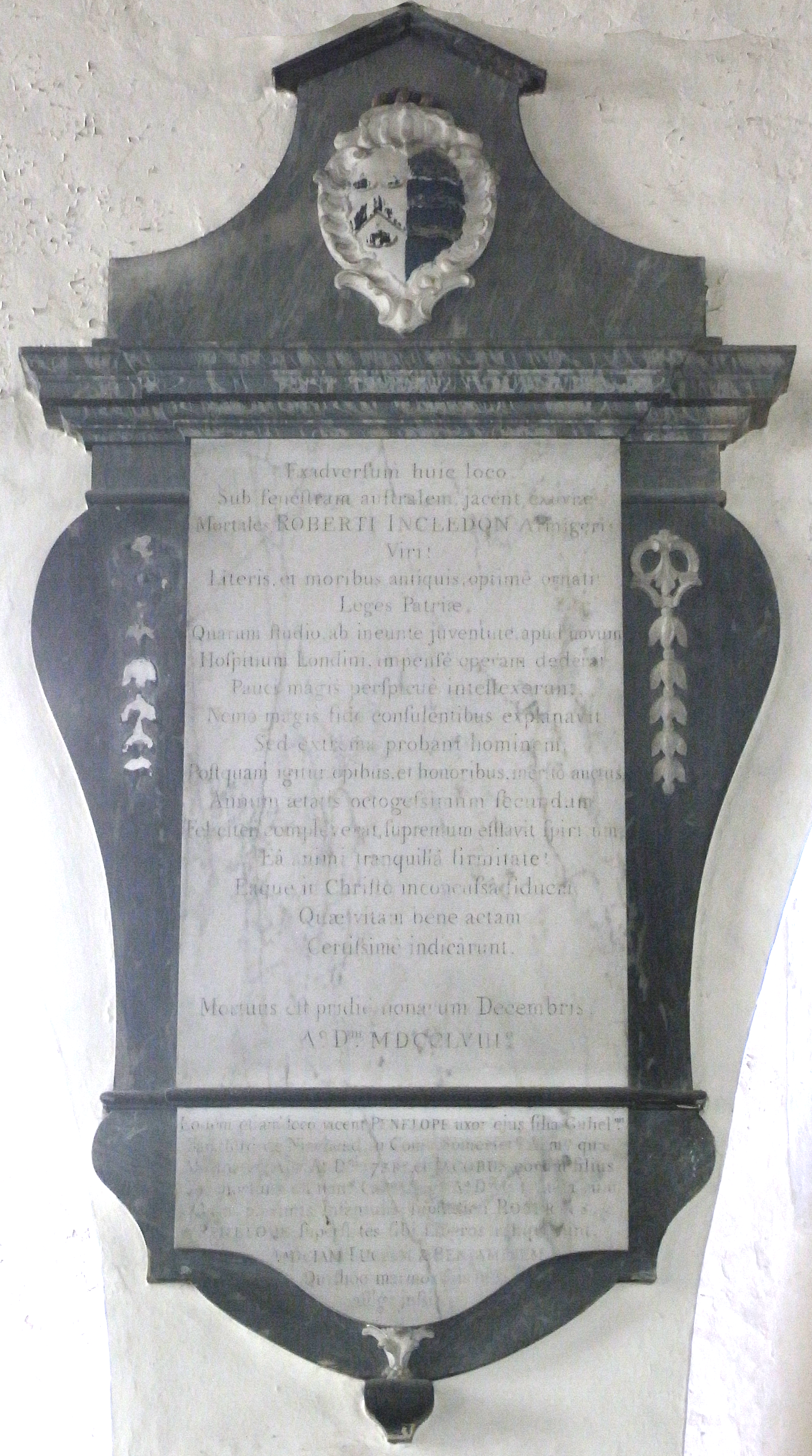
Mural monument to Robert Incledon in Pilton Church

His mural monument survives in Pilton Church inscribed as follows:

Exadversum huic loco sub fenestram australem jacent exuviae mortales Roberti Incledon Armigeri viri literis et moribus antiquis optime ornati leges patriae quarum studio ab ineunte juventute apud Novum Hospitium Londini impense operam dederat pauci magis perspicue intellexerunt nemo magis fide consulentibus explanavit sed extrema probant hominem postquam igitur opibus et honoribus merito auctus annum aetatis octogessimam secundum feliciter compleverat supremum efflavit spiritum ea animi tranquilla firmitate eaque in Christo inconcussa fiducia quae vitam bene actam certissime indicarunt mortuus est pridie nonarum Decembris A(nn)^{o} D(omi)^{ni}MDCCLVIII^{o}. ("Opposite to this place under the south window lie the mortal remains of Robert Incledon, Esquire, a man most well embellished in antique writings and customs. The laws of our country, to the study of which from his entering as a young man New Inn of London he gave immense work, few understood more clearly. No man with greater faithfulness interpreted to the magistrates but the ends prove the man (?). After therefore by his works and honours having enlarged in merit, he completed happily the eighty second year of his age, he breathed out his final breath of his spirit with a strong calmness and that in an unbroken faith in Christ which indicate most certainly a life well conducted. He died on the first day of the Nones of December in the year of our Lord the one thousandth seven hundredth and eighth".)

And inscribed below:

Eodem loco jacent Penelope uxor eius filia Guliel^{mi} Sandford de Ninehead in com(itatu) Somerset Arm(iger)^{i} quae mortua est April A(nn)^{o} D(omi)^{ni} 1738^{o} et Jacobus eorum filius qui mortuus est non. ... Aug A(nn)^{o} D(omi)^{ni} 174.. una cum q... plurimis infantulis supradicti Robertus & Penelope superstites reliquerunt Amiciam Luciam & Benjaminum qui hoc marmor suis hic affigi jussi... ("In the same place lie Penelope his wife a daughter of William Sandford of Nynehead in the county of Somerset, Esquire, who died in April in the year of our Lord 1738 and james the son of them who died on ... of August 174.. with many infants. The above Robert and Penelope left surviving Amicia, Lucy and Benjamin who ordered this marble to be affixed")

Above are shown the arms of Incledon: Argent, a chevron engrailed between three tuns sable fire issuing from the bung hole proper impaling: Sandford Azure, three bars wavy argent.

== Sources ==
- Burke's Genealogical and Heraldic History of the Landed Gentry, 15th Edition, ed. Pirie-Gordon, H., London, 1937, pp. 2390–1, pedigree of Incledon-Webber of Buckland
- Vivian, Lt.Col. J.L., (Ed.) The Visitations of the County of Devon: Comprising the Heralds' Visitations of 1531, 1564 & 1620, Exeter, 1895, pp. 497–9, pedigree of Incledon of Buckland
