= Benjamin Incledon =

English antiquarian and genealogist

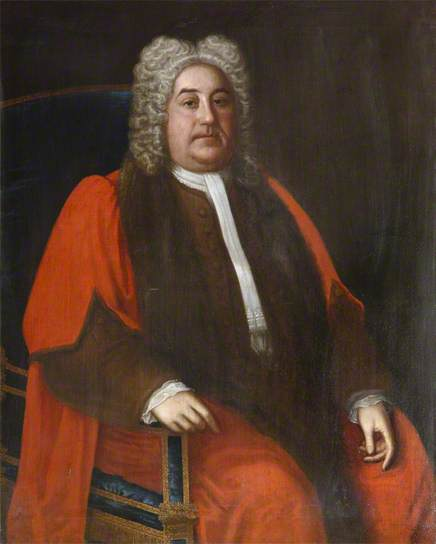
- Benjamin Incledon (1730–1796). Portrait by studio of Thomas Hudson (1701–1779), collection of Barnstaple Town Council, displayed in Council Chamber, Barnstaple Guildhall

Personal details
- Born: 1730
- Died: 7 August 1796 (aged 65–66) Barnstaple, Devon, England
- Spouse: Margaret Newton (m. 1757)
- Children: 2
- Parent: Robert Incledon (father)

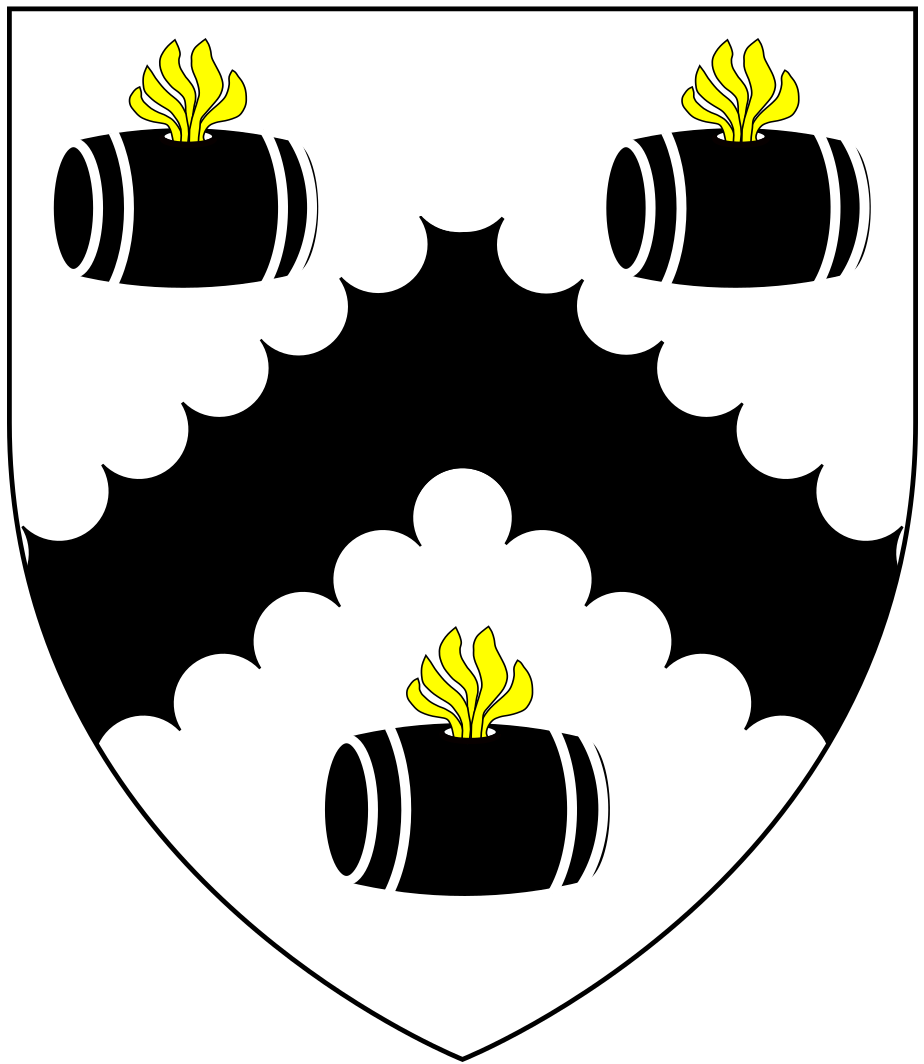
Arms of Incledon of Incledon and Buckland in the parish of Braunton, North Devon: Argent, a chevron engrailed between three tuns sable fire issuing from the bung hole proper.Canting arms "incend-tun"

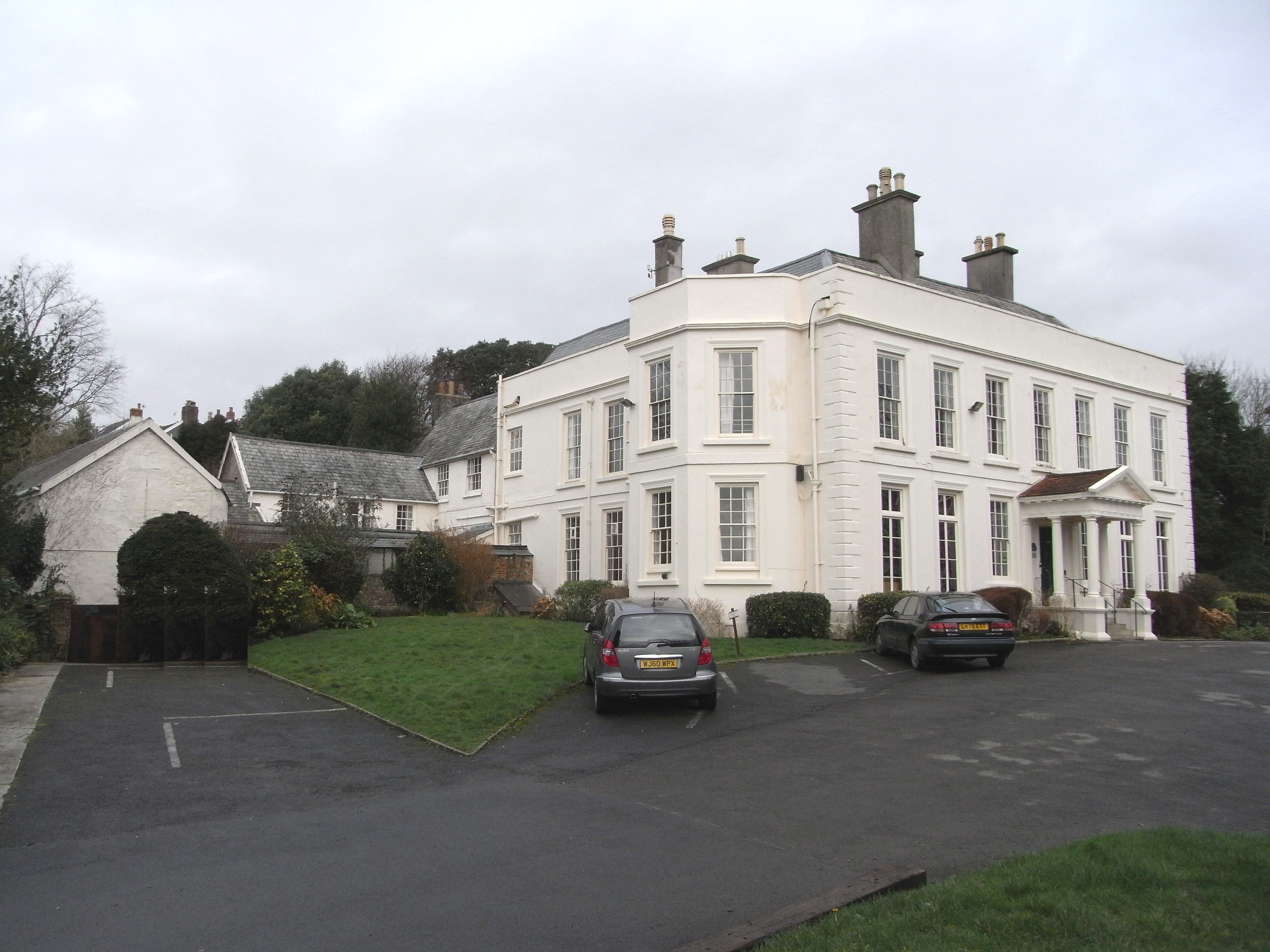
Pilton House, Pilton, near Barnstaple, Devon, home of Benjamin Incledon, built in 1746 by his father Robert Incledon (1676–1758)

Benjamin Incledon (1730–1796) (pronounced "Ingledon") of Pilton House, Pilton, near Barnstaple in North Devon, was an English antiquarian and genealogist. He served as Recorder of Barnstaple (1758–1796).

== Origins ==
Incledon was baptised at Pilton, near Barnstaple, Devonshire, on 6 June 1730. He was the second son and heir of Robert Incledon (1676–1758), builder of Pilton House, Deputy Recorder of Barnstaple and twice Mayor of Barnstaple, in 1712 and 1721, by his second wife, Penelope Sandford, daughter of John Sandford of Ninehead, Somerset. His father was buried at Pilton on 9 December 1758, aged 83, and his mother likewise on 30 April 1738. His family originated in the 12th century at the estate of Incledon in the parish of Braunton, near Barnstaple, in North Devon, and in 1319 purchased the adjoining estate of Buckland, which they later made their principal seat.

== Career ==
Benjamin Incledon was educated at Blundell's School in Tiverton, Devon, and in 1765 was elected as a feoffee of that foundation. He was also a trustee of Comyn or Chilcott's free English school at Tiverton.

With an ample patrimony, he interested himself all his life in the ancient families of Devonshire. The Devon historian Richard Polwhele referred to his skill in compiling pedigrees, and the Stemmata Fortescuana, which he drew up in 1795, form the basis of the genealogies in Lord Clermont's "History of the Family of Fortescue". For some unknown reason he refused to submit his pedigrees to the inspection of Polwhele, who thereupon addressed to him an angry letter, which is printed in the 'Gentleman's Magazine' for April 1791, p. 308, and in his 'Traditions,' i. 258–9.

Incledon printed at Exeter, in 1792, at his own expense, for the use of the governing body, a volume entitled "Donations of Peter Blundell and other Benefactors to the Free Grammar School at Tiverton", which was reprinted by the trustees, with notes and additions, in 1804 and 1826. He was thus the first historian of Blundell's School. The Register of Blundell's School (1904) states:

"At Blundell's he is remembered by many gifts and institutions, such as the picture of Samuel Wesley in the Library, the Register, the manuscript volume he compiled on the donations of Peter Blundell given by him to the Feoffees and now in the possession of the Governors; by the same book published at his own expense in 1792, the frontispiece therein now used on all the School Prizes and Books; the pictures of Blundell and Popham in the Big School. Although these pictures were received after his death, their receipt was doubtless due to his exertions".

His account of St. Margaret's Hospital at Pilton appeared in the Archæologia, xii. pp. 211–14. His manuscript collections on the Fortescues are deposited with Lord Fortescue at Castle Hill. The rest of his papers seem to have been dispersed. From 1758 until his death he was Recorder of Barnstaple, and took great delight in its municipal records. In Gribble's "Memorials of Barnstaple" (1830) are copies of his lists of its mayors and members.

== List of works ==
- Copies of inscriptions on monuments and tombstones in the churches and churchyards of 128 Devonshire parishes, situated in the rural deaneries of Barnstaple, Shirwell, South Molton, Chumleigh, Torrington, Hartland, Holsworthy, Tiverton, Collumpton, Honiton, Aylesbeare, Ottery and Moreton. Transcribed in the years, 1769–72, 1774–6, 1779–81 and 1788–93. In three volumes formerly held in the Muniment Room of the North Devon Athenaeum, Barnstaple, now in the North Devon Record Office, Barnstaple.

== Marriage and children ==
In 1757 at Tiverton he married Margaret Newton (died 1803), second daughter and co-heiress of John Newton of Tiverton. She died at the Castle, Barnstaple, on 8 September 1803. He left children including:

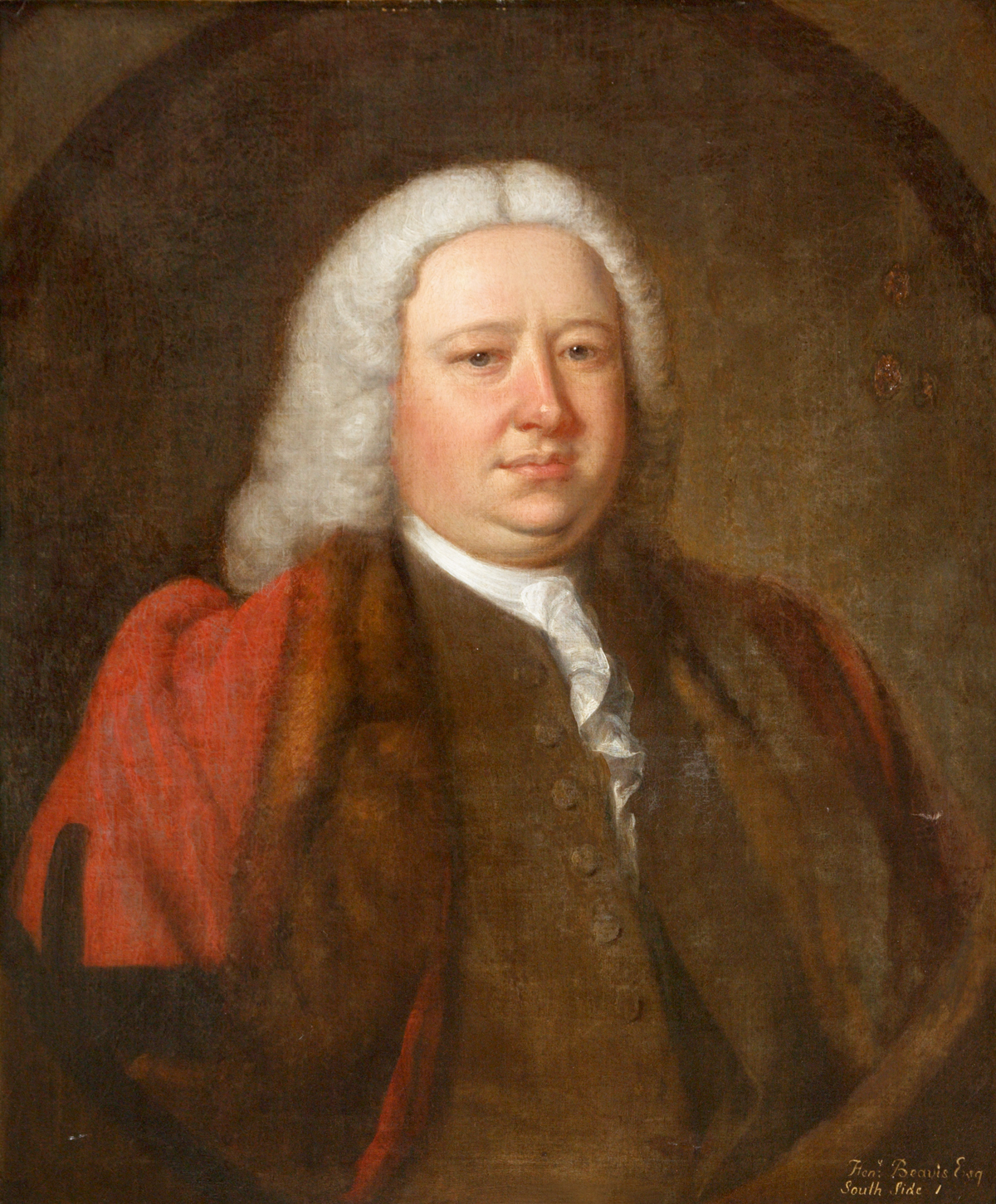
Henry Beavis, Mayor of Barnstaple in 1738 and 1751, father of Col. Henry Beavis of Yeotown, Goodleigh, North Devon, who was father-in-law of Robert Newton Incledon (1761–1846). Portrait by studio of Thomas Hudson (1701–1779), Collection of Barnstaple Town Council, displayed in Barnstaple Guildhall

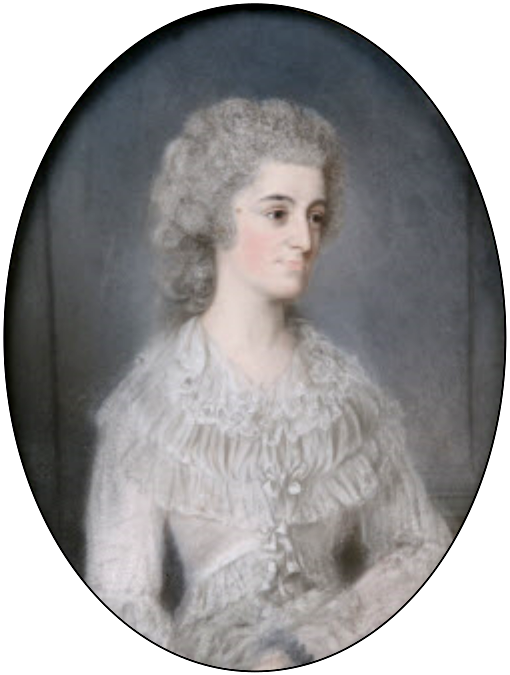
Betty Incledon, wife of Thomas Rose Drew (1740–1815), pastel by Lewis Vaslet (1742–1808), collection of Dunster Castle

- Robert Newton Incledon (1761–1846), eldest son and heir, who in 1797 married Elizabeth Beavis, the adopted daughter of Col. Henry Beavis of Yeotown, Goodleigh, son of Henry Beavis, Mayor of Barnstaple in 1738 and 1751, the latter whose portrait survives in Barnstaple Guildhall. On 5 July 1803 Henry Beavis was appointed by the King as Lieutenant-Colonel Commandant (of 441 men) of the Barnstaple Volunteer Infantry (one of several regiments then being raised nationwide to defend against a possible French invasion by Napoleon) and in 1826 was trustee of the Barnstaple charity established by the will of John Phillips (died 1734), whose executor had been the Colonel's father Henry Beavis. The senior line of the family of Beavis had been from the 16th century lords of the manor of Clyst Satchville, Devon. In 1822 Clist House was the seat of Lord Graves, whose father Lord Graves had purchased it from the executors of "Miss Beavis" (died 1801). In 1806 Robert sold Pilton House to James Whyte and in 1807 was resident at Yeotown House, the mansion house on his wife's family estate of Yeotown, which he re-built with neo-Gothic facade of his own design, of which survives today only a castellated lodge with two square towers and a crenellated bow-window, known as Ivy Lodge. Robert purchased the manor of Goodleigh, whose tenants were exempt from toll at the markets and fairs at Barnstaple, from the Rashleigh family. He left two daughters, including Margaret Incledon, the last of the Incledon family, alive in 1890, jointly lords of the manor of Goodleigh in 1850. The large inscribed grave-slab of Robert and his wife Elizabeth survives in the south aisle of the chancel of Pilton Church.
- Betty Incledon (1738-), who in 1782 married Thomas Rose Drew (1740–1815) of Wooton FitzPaine, who inherited The Grange, Broadhembury, Devon, on the death of his elder brother. Individual oval portraits Betty and her husband painted by Lewis Vaslet (1742–1808) survive in the collection of Dunster Castle in Somerset. She died without children.

== Death ==
Incledon died at Barnstaple, after a long illness, on 7 August 1796.
