= Lewis Vaslet =

English painter

- Born: 1742; York, Yorkshire, England
- Died: 1808 (aged 65–66); Bath, Somerset, England
- Spouse: Juliet Elizabeth Booth Clarke (m. 1776)

Lewis II Vaslet (1742–1808) was an English portrait painter. His most common works were small or miniature oval pastels in the style of the Irish painter Hugh Douglas Hamilton (c. 1740–1808), showing head and shoulders at 3/4 orientation, often viewed slightly from below.

== Origins ==
He was born in 1742 in York, the son of Andrew (or André) Vaslet (1694–1768), who ran a boarding school for young ladies in York. Andre was the son of Lewis I (alias Louis, Ludovici) Vaslet (1666–1731), a Huguenot school teacher and headmaster of Fulham School, west of London, (later known as Burlington House School) who in 1723 in The Hague published a translation of Cellarius, and in 1731 in London published a trilingual dictionary. Lewis I purchased Fulham House from Colonel George Howard. Lewis I's gravestone records that he "bestowed great pains upon the teaching of the young through a period of 45 years".

== Career ==
Lewis II commenced his career as a soldier, and was an ensign when stationed in Gibraltar. He soon abandoned that profession and travelled to Italy to study painting. In 1770 and 1771, then resident in York, and having obtained many clients from amongst the local gentry, he submitted miniature portraits for assessment and display at the Royal Academy in London. In about 1775 he moved to Bath in Somerset, where he lived for the rest of his life.

== Marriage and children ==
In 1776 at Bath he married Juliet Elizabeth Booth Clarke, of the parish of St Michael's, Bath.

== Works ==
In 1787 he advertised his repertoire in the mediums of "oils, miniature, crayons &c." as including:

"Views of gentlemen’s seats etc., also game, live and dead fish, fruits, flowers, hot house plants and insects etc., so combined and put together as to compose desirable furniture pictures and proper for the ingenious imitation of such ladies who are proficient in drawing needlework embroidery etc."

== Surviving works ==
His surviving works include:

- A group of 14 pastels in the New Common Room at Merton College, Oxford
- pastels of members of Merton College, Oxford, in private collections.

== Death and burial ==
Vaslet died in 1808, having written his will in 1806 (at Caroline Buildings in the parish of Lyncombe and Widcombe, Somerset).

== Sources ==
- Jeffares, Neil, Dictionary of Pastellists before 1800, on-line edition
