= Buckland, Braunton =

Historic estate in Devon, England

Coordinates: 51.1188°N 4.1677°W

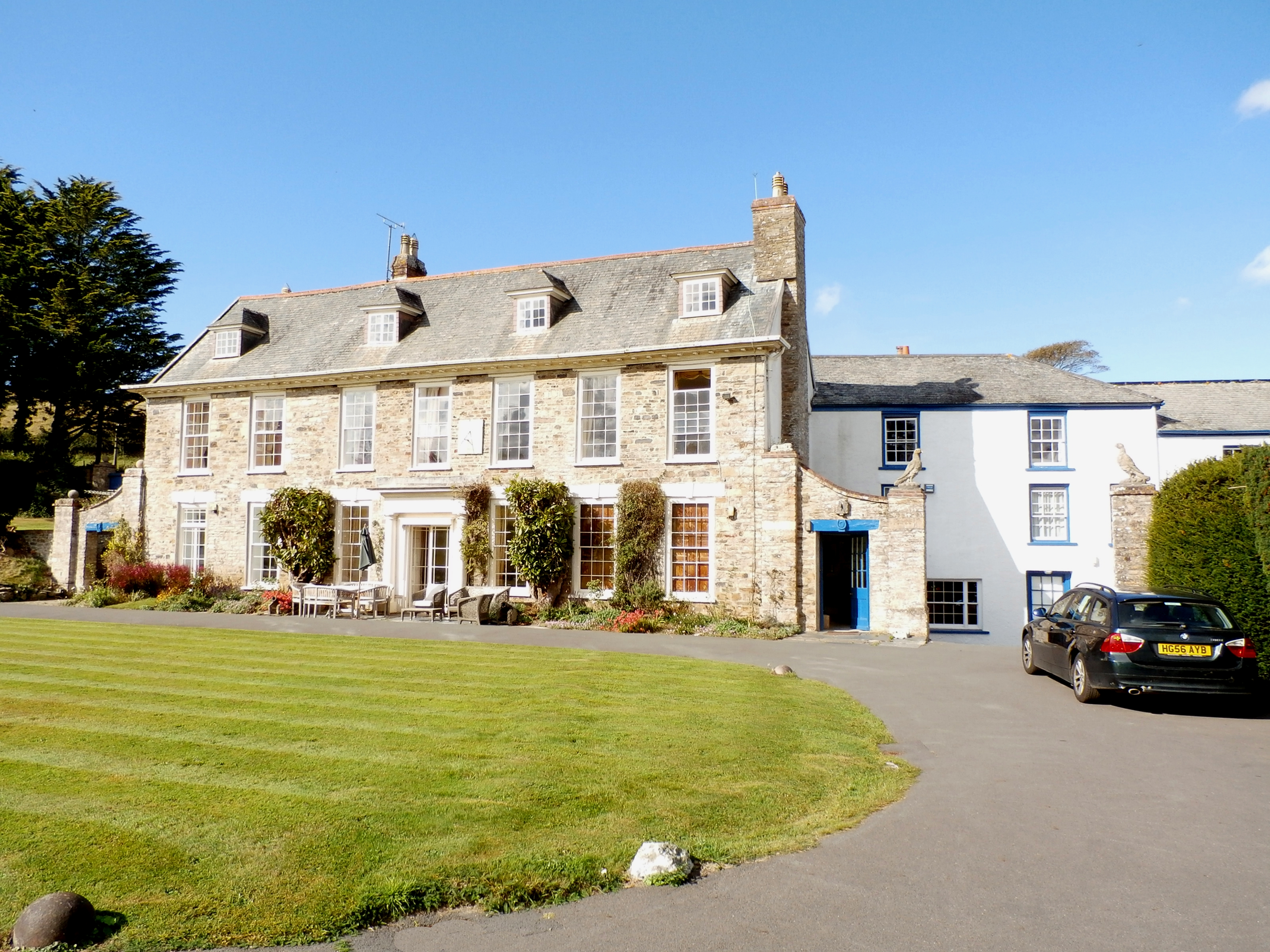
Buckland House, Braunton. The present Georgian facade dates from 1762. The gatepiers on the right are topped with the Incledon crest of a falcon.

Buckland in the parish of Braunton, North Devon, England, is an ancient historic estate purchased in 1319 by Godfrey II de Incledene of Incledon, the adjoining estate about 1/2 mile to the north-west, whose family (later Incledon), is first recorded in 1160. The estate lies half a mile north-west of St Brannock's Church in Braunton.

== Ownership ==
According to Vivian (1895), the first recorded member of the family was Robert de Incledon, living in 1160. The Book of Fees (probably 13th century) lists Incledene as held from the Honour of Barnstaple by "Nicholas de Ferariis" (Ferrers) and "Robert de Incledene". The property passed through the Incledon family until the death of John VII Incledon (1702–1746), of Buckland; his only son John Incledon (1741–1741) died an infant, leaving two daughters as his co-heiresses. The elder daughter, Mary (1736–1802), married in 1759 Philip Rogers Webber (1732–1819), JP and DL for Devon; their descendants still own the property.

The owner of the estate in 1937, William Beare Incledon-Webber (born 1872) was also lord of the manor of nearby Croyde and Putsborough.

== Manor house ==
Buckland Manor, or Buckland House, a Grade II* listed mansion remodelled in the 18th century, was still occupied in 2014 by descendants of the Incledon-Webber family, formerly prominent in the political and commercial life of nearby Barnstaple and North Devon. The south front is a rebuilding of 1762, with seven bays, a porch with Tuscan columns and a plain cornice, and four attic dormers. Two rear wings – one from the early 17th century, the other later and extended in the 18th century – form a three-sided courtyard. A further large three-storey wing was added to the right, set back, in the 18th century.

A threshing barn with attached horse engine house, dated 1712, is next to the north-west corner of the house and also Grade II* listed. The listing states: "Complete massive gearing beam with horse-driven vertically shafted winding cog makes this a rare and unusually complete survival". Three sets of outbuildings nearby are listed at Grade II: a former slaughter-and-salting-house with wash-house, potato-store with loft over and cider-house, all probably 17th century; a shippon (cowshed) dated 1660 with 18th-century root store and bullock shed; and further from the house, 18th-century stables with a loft.

== Sources ==
- Burke's Genealogical and Heraldic History of the Landed Gentry, 15th Edition, ed. Pirie-Gordon, H., London, 1937, pp. 2390–1, pedigree of Incledon-Webber of Buckland
- Vivian, Lt.Col. J.L., (Ed.) The Visitations of the County of Devon: Comprising the Heralds' Visitations of 1531, 1564 & 1620, Exeter, 1895, pp. 497–9, pedigree of Incledon of Buckland
