= Pilton House, Pilton =

Georgian mansion house in Devon, England

Coordinates: 51.0875°N 4.0610°W

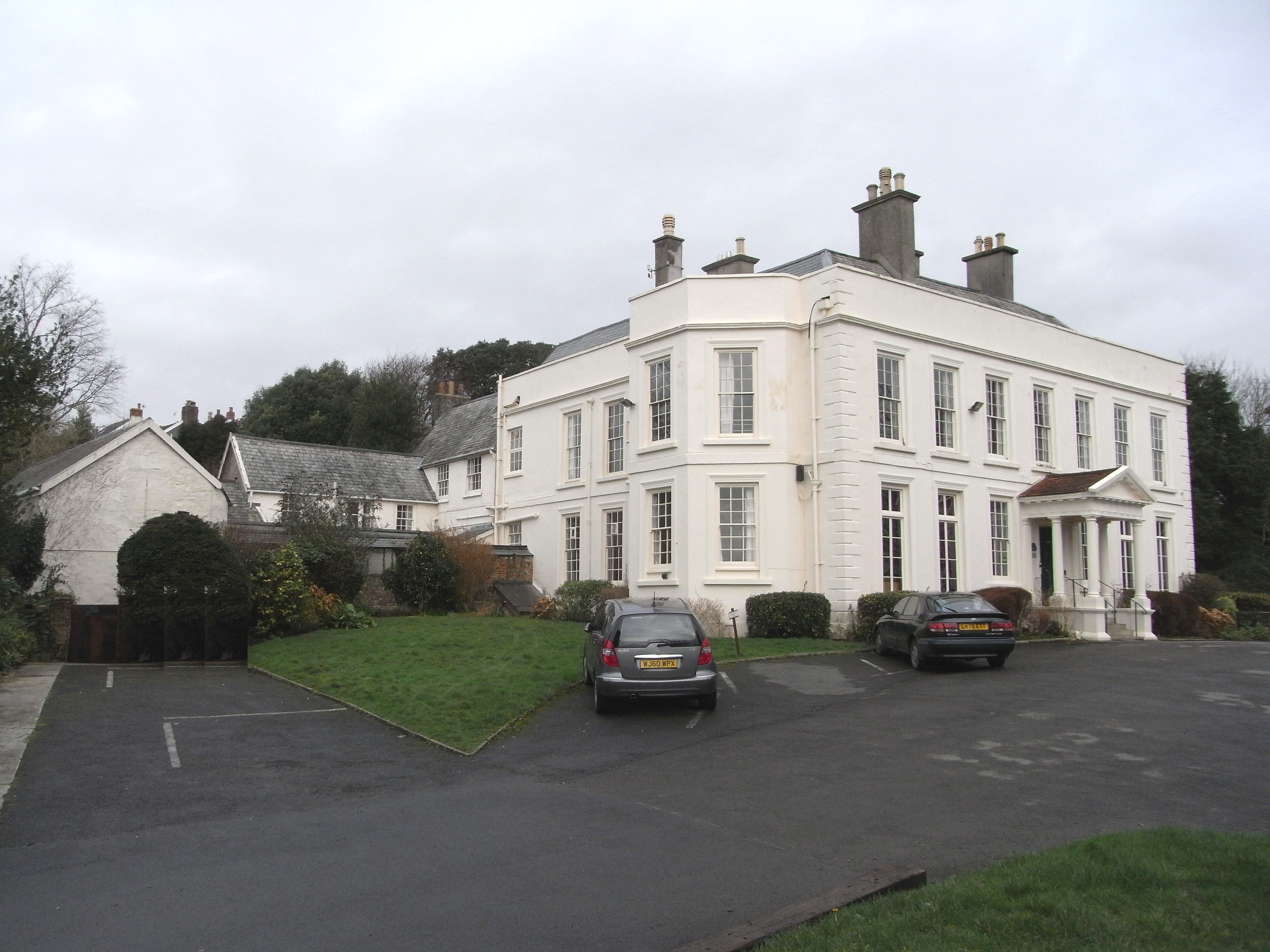
Pilton House, near Barnstaple, Devon, built in 1746 by Robert Incledon (1676-1758)

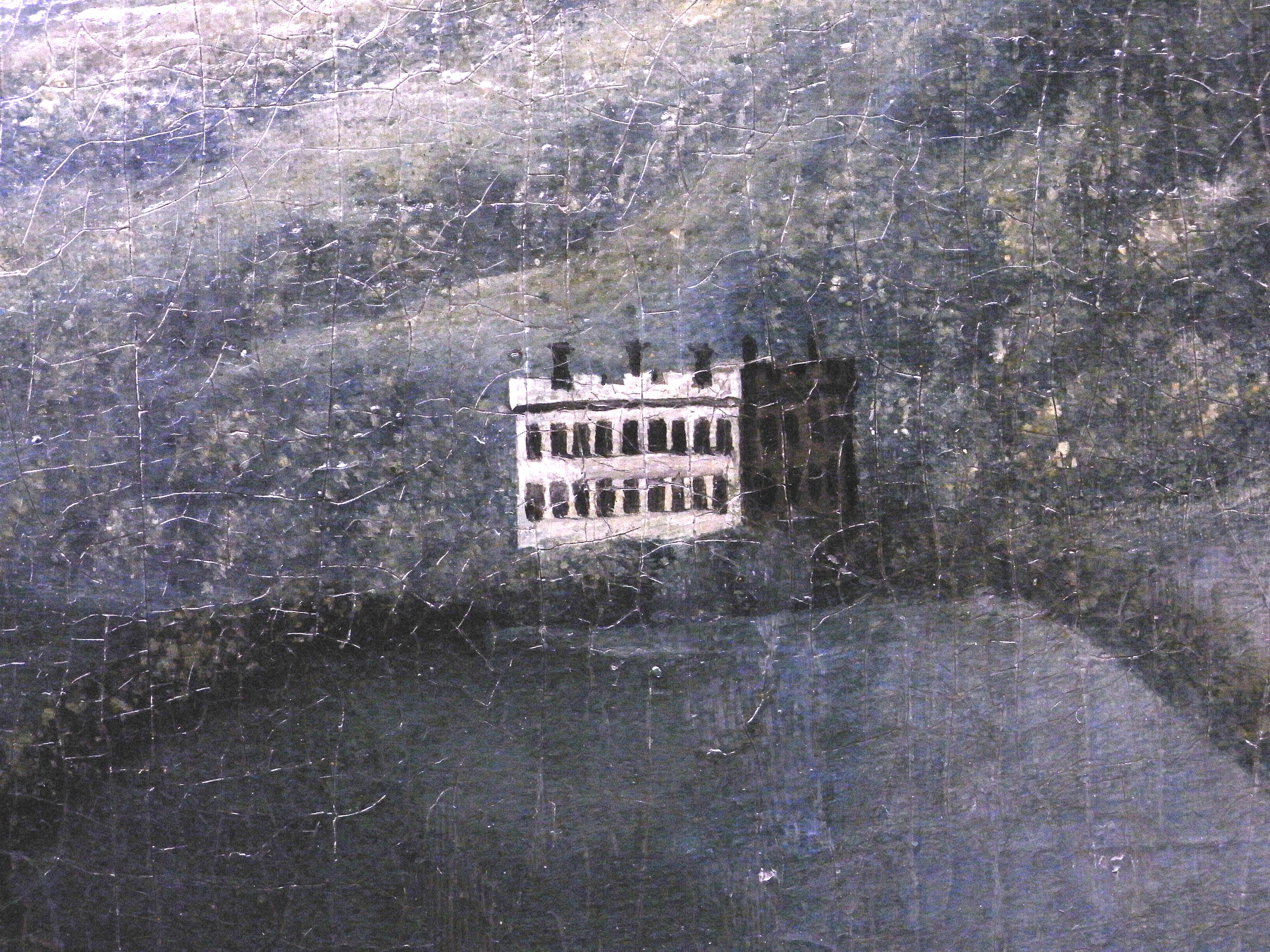
Crenellated mansion house on or near site of Pilton House, detail from an undocumented 18th century (?) oil painting (see below) now in the Museum of Barnstaple and North Devon, showing a distant view from the west bank of the River Taw, of the adjacent towns of Barnstaple and Pilton

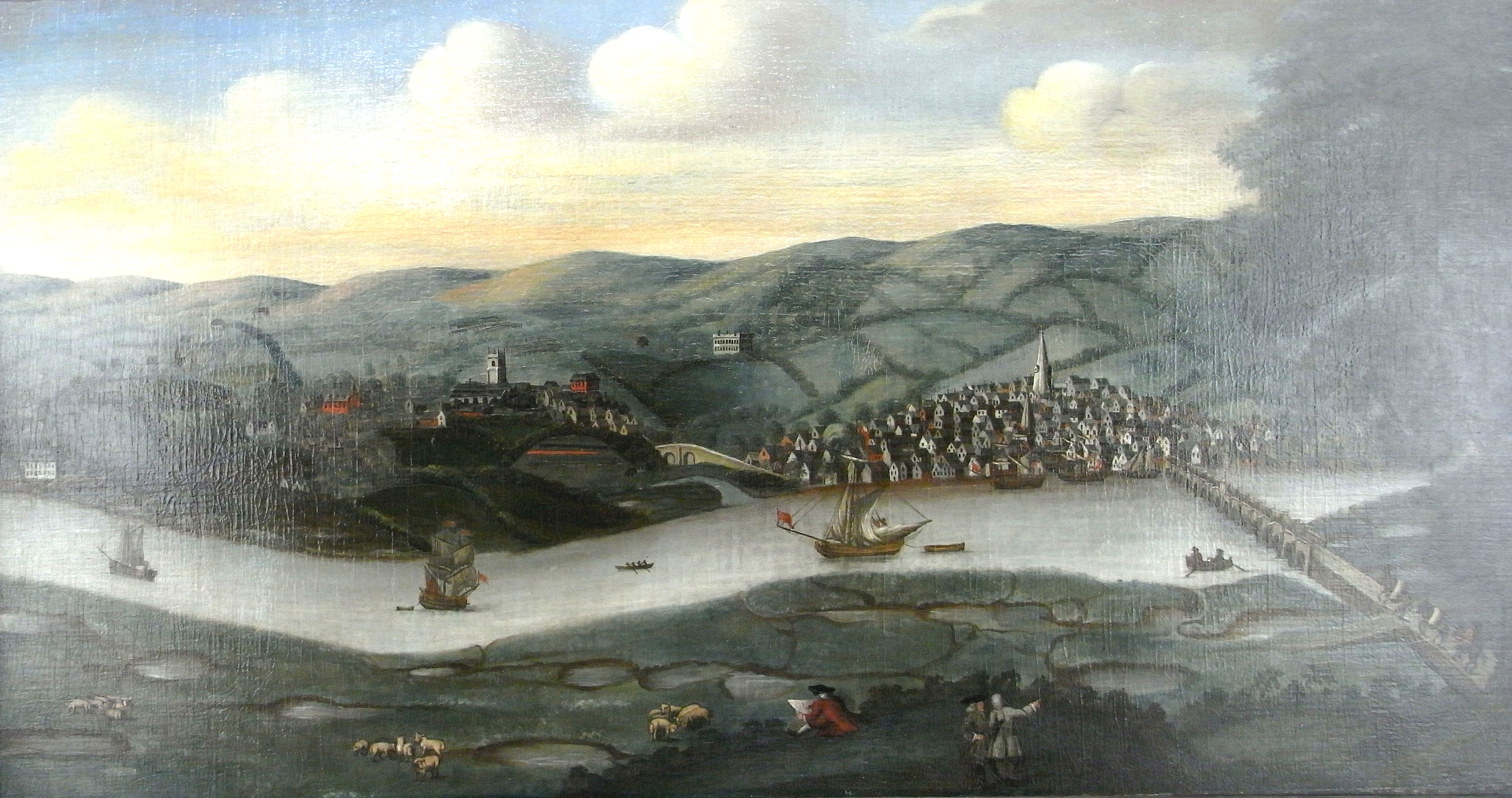
18th century view of Pilton (left) and Barnstaple (right), divided by the small River Yeo, flowing into the broad River Taw (foreground). Left: St Mary's Church, Pilton; Pilton Bridge over the River Yeo. The centrally placed crenellated white mansion house appears to represent Pilton House. Right: St Peter's Church, Barnstaple, with spire; Barnstaple Long Bridge over River Taw. Undocumented 18th century (?) oil painting now in the Museum of Barnstaple and North Devon

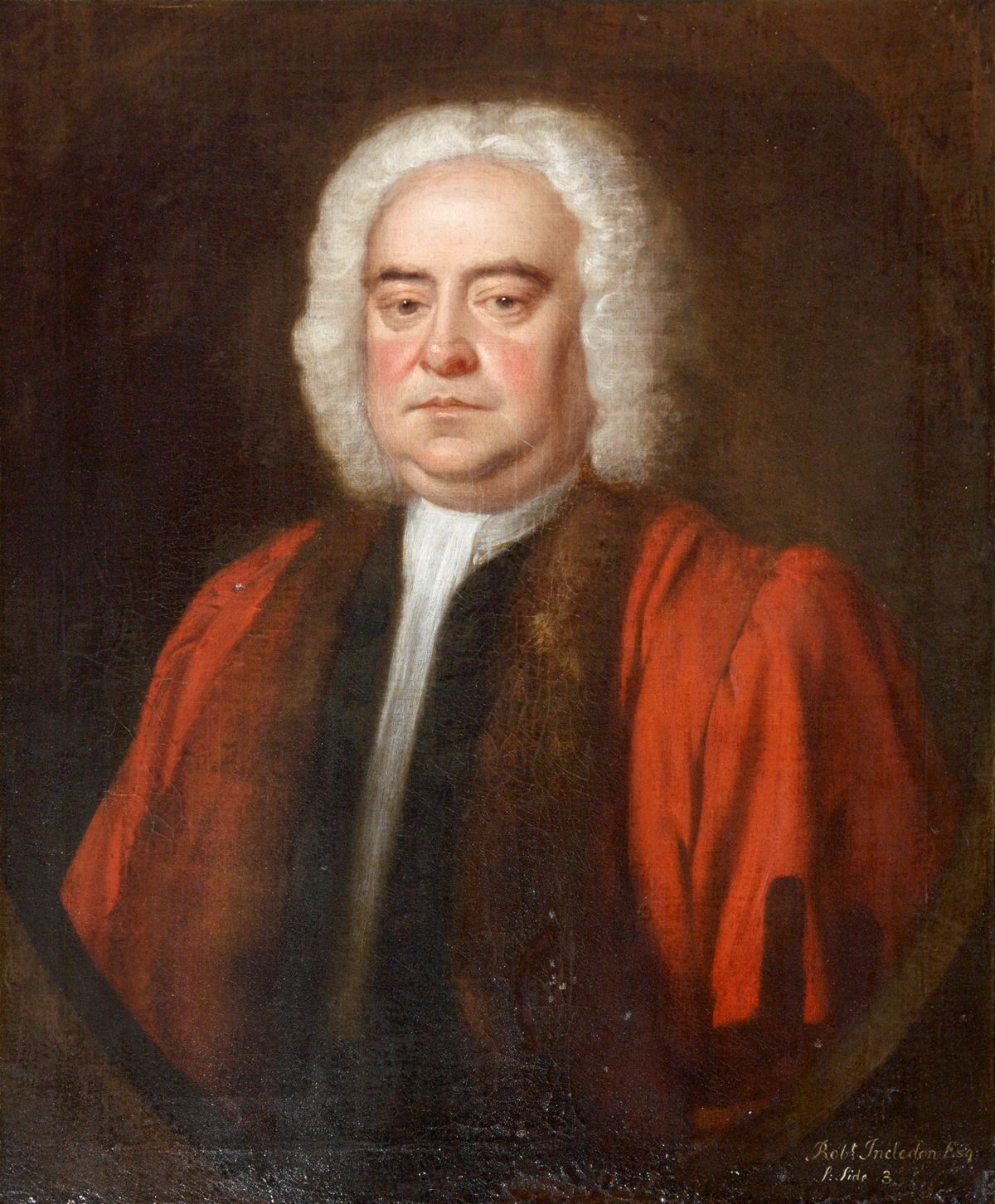
Robert Incledon (1676-1758) builder of Pilton House in 1746. Portrait by Studio of Thomas Hudson (1701–1779), collection of Barnstaple Town Council, displayed in Barnstaple Guildhall

Pilton House in the parish of Pilton, near Barnstaple, North Devon, Ex31, is an historic grade II listed Georgian mansion house built in 1746 by Robert Incledon (1676-1758), twice Mayor of Barnstaple, who was from nearby Braunton. It is situated almost in the centre of the ancient town of Pilton, but had formerly extensive grounds covering at least 20 acres, which extended down "Pilton Lawn", now built over, to the River Yeo. It later served as the residence for various Members of Parliament for Barnstaple, for which it was well suited being only a 10-minute walk from the centre of that town, yet in a secluded situation with extensive grounds, and sufficiently large and grand for entertaining borough officials and electors.

== History ==
No records detailing the history of the site of Pilton House before the 18th century survive on available title deeds. It is believed to occupy the site of the demolished mediaeval Pilton Priory. Reed (1985) states that the site was part of the Pilton Priory lands purchased following the Dissolution of the Monasteries by the lawyer George Rolle (d.1552) of Stevenstone, founder of the influential and wealthy Rolle family, and quickly re-sold by him in 1545 piecemeal and at a profit.

=== Ownership ===
Pilton House was built in 1746 by Robert Incledon (1676-1758), a lawyer of New Inn, London, Clerk of the Peace and Deputy Recorder of Barnstaple and twice Mayor of Barnstaple, in 1712 and 1721. He was a member of the local ancient gentry family of de Incledon (later Incledon, pronounced "Ingleton"), which originated at the estate of Incledon, in the parish of Braunton, which family is first recorded in 1160. In 1806, Robert's son, Benjamin Incledon (1730-1796), "The Antiquary", sold Pilton House to James Whyte; in 1849, beset by financial difficulties, Whyte put the estate up for sale. The next owner was Sir William Fraser, 4th Baronet (1826-1898), a politician, author and book collector.

By 1880, Pilton House was the residence of Charles Henry Williams (1834-1908; known as Charles Henry Basset, from 1880), a naval and military officer, JP and Deputy Lieutenant for Devon, and Conservative Party Member of Parliament for Barnstaple, 1868–1874. He was master of the Devon and Somerset Staghounds between 1887 and 1893, and provided much assistance in establishing the Barnstaple Staghounds, for which purpose he provided Pilton House as occasional accommodation for hounds and hunt staff when hunting in the vicinity.

In 1893, the occupant was Major General Hugh Chichester (1836-1896), JP, of the Royal Bengal Artillery, Of an ancient family seated at Raleigh, Chichester's great-grandmother was Amy Incledon, eldest daughter of Robert, who built Pilton House.

In 1948 the estate was acquired by the Barnstaple Old People's Housing Association and continues in that use in 2014.

== Sources ==
- Reed, Margaret A., Pilton: Its Past and Its People, Barnstaple, 1985
- Burke's Genealogical and Heraldic History of the Landed Gentry, 15th Edition, ed. Pirie-Gordon, H., London, 1937, pp. 2390–1, pedigree of Incledon-Webber of Buckland
- Vivian, Lt.Col. J.L., (Ed.) The Visitations of the County of Devon: Comprising the Heralds' Visitations of 1531, 1564 & 1620, Exeter, 1895, pp. 497–9, pedigree of Incledon of Buckland
- Pevsner, Nikolaus & Cherry, Bridget, The Buildings of England: Devon, London, 2004
