= Barnstaple Yeo =

Tributary of the River Taw in Devon, England

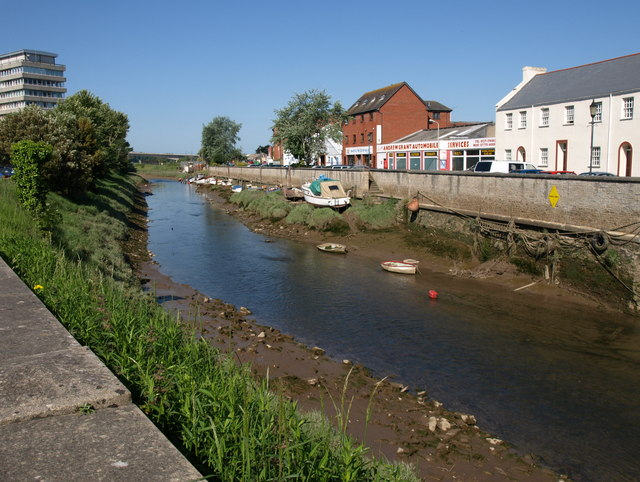
The tidal River Yeo in Barnstaple

The Barnstaple Yeo, also known as the River Yeo, is a tributary of the River Taw, which enters the Taw at Barnstaple in Devon, England. It is one of several rivers of the same name, including another tributary of the Taw, the Lapford Yeo.

The Barnstaple Yeo rises on Berry Down, south of Combe Martin, and flows south through the grounds of Arlington Court and past the village of Chelfham and into the River Taw at Barnstaple. The river length from source to mouth is 12 miles (20 km).

The last mile of the river is tidal and prone to flooding both when in spate, but also from the sea. A plan has been put forward to divert the river through an 82 feet (25 m) channel in Pilton Park in Barnstaple to alleviate extreme flooding events.
