= Sir Arthur Chichester, 3rd Baronet =

English landowner and politician

Sir Arthur Chichester, 3rd Baronet (c. 1662–1718), of Youlston Park, Devon was an English landowner and politician who sat in the House of Commons in two periods between 1685 and 1718.

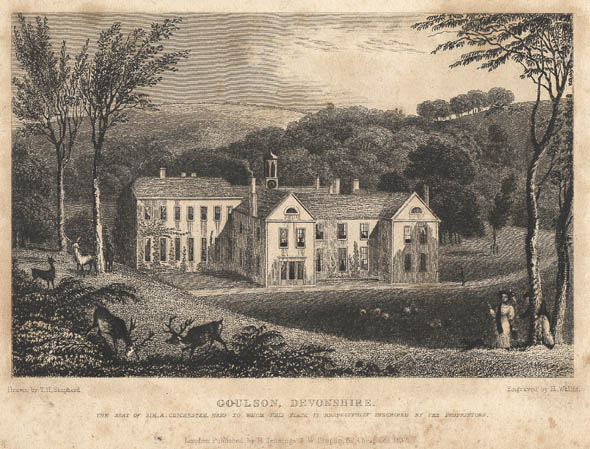
Youlston Park, Devon

Chichester was the second son of Sir John Chichester, 1st Baronet and his second wife, Mary Colly. He succeeded to the baronetcy on the death of his brother Sir John Chichester, 2nd Baronet in September 1680. He married Elizabeth Drewe, daughter of Thomas Drewe of Broadhembury Grange on 15 April 1684. In 1684, having sold the family estate of Raleigh and acquired a new one at Youlston, near Barnstaple, he became a freeman of Barnstaple.

In 1685, Chichester was elected Member of Parliament for Barnstaple and was re-elected to the Convention parliament in 1689. He did not stand in 1690 and remained out of parliament until returned for Barnstaple again at the 1713 general election. He was returned unopposed again at the 1715 general election.

Chichester died on 3 February 1718. He had four sons and six daughters. He was succeeded in the baronetcy by his son John who was also MP for Barnstaple.

Parliament of Great Britain
Preceded by John Basset; Richard Lee	Member of Parliament for Barnstaple; 1685–1690; With: John Basset; Richard Lee	Succeeded by Sir George Hutchins; Arthur Champneys
Preceded by Sir Nicholas Hooper; Richard Acland	Member of Parliament for Barnstaple; 1713–1718; With: Sir Nicholas Hooper; John Rolle	Succeeded by John Rolle; John Basset
Baronetage of England
Preceded by John Chichester	Baronet (of Raleigh); 1680-1718	Succeeded by John Chichester
