= Yeo Vale =

Historic estate in Devon, England

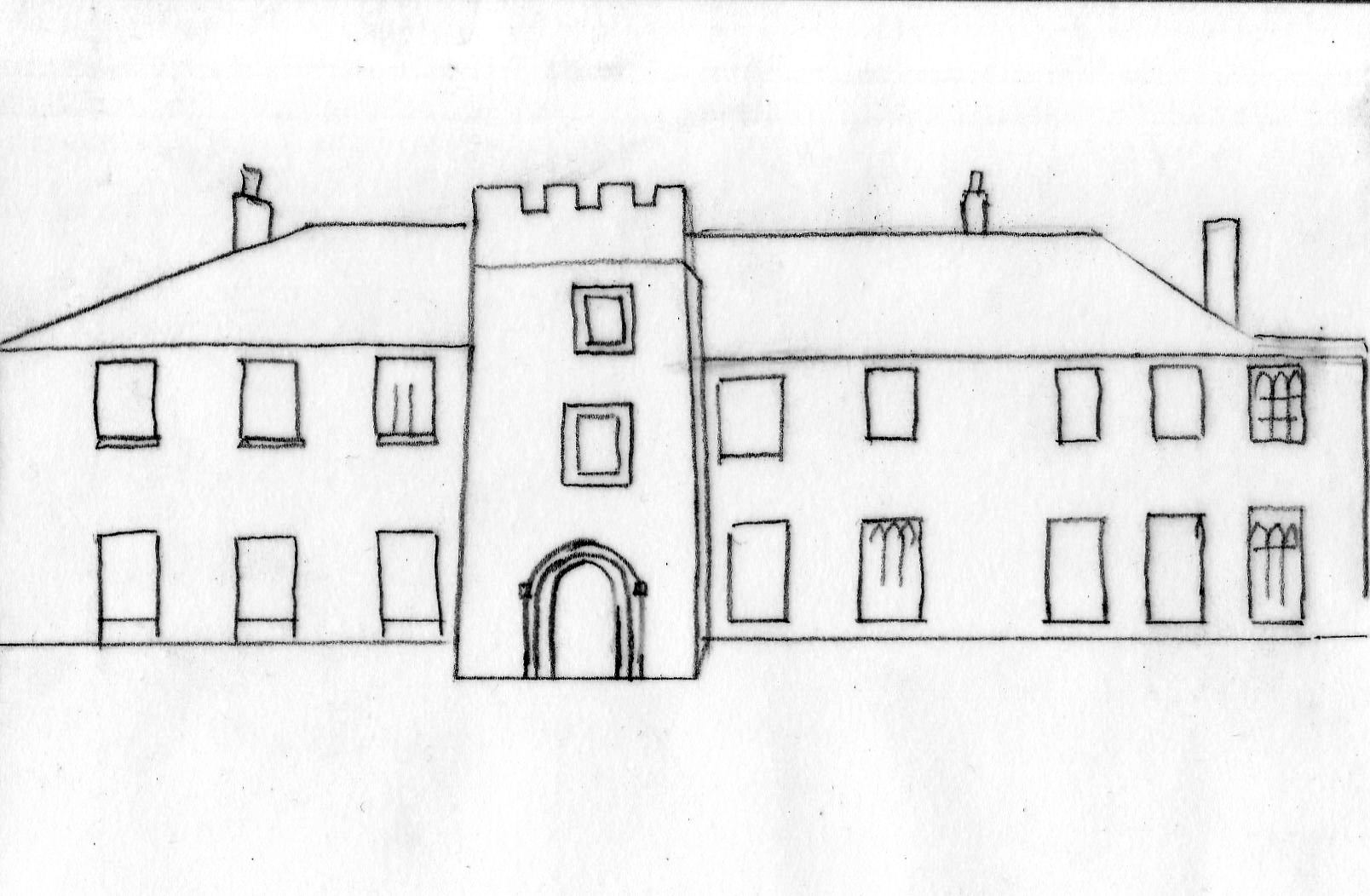
Yeo Vale House, south front, drawing from photograph of derelict house circa 1960. The rubble-stone built crenellated entrance tower is mediaeval, the stucco facade behind is Georgian (18th century)

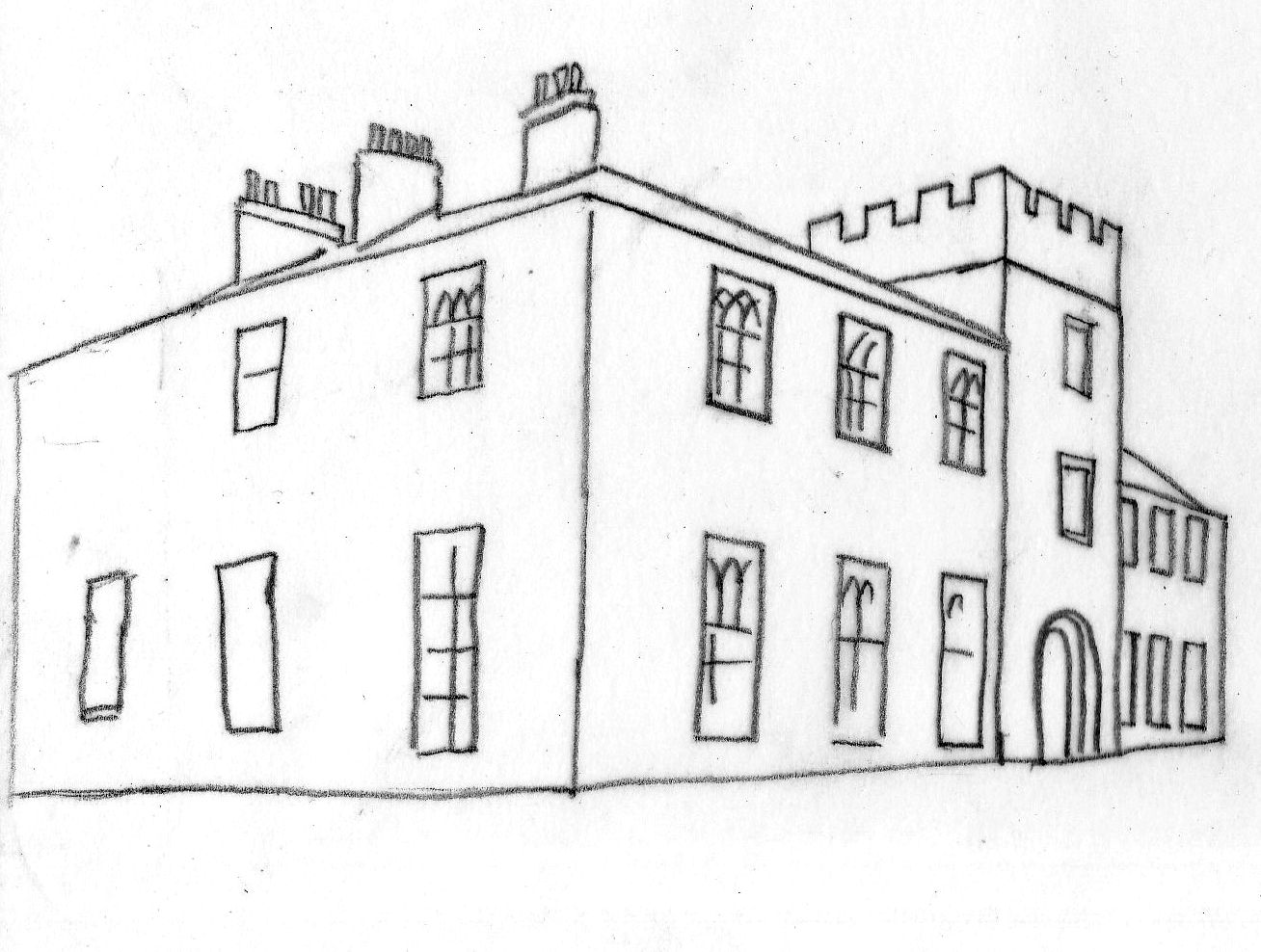
Yeo Vale House, view from south-west

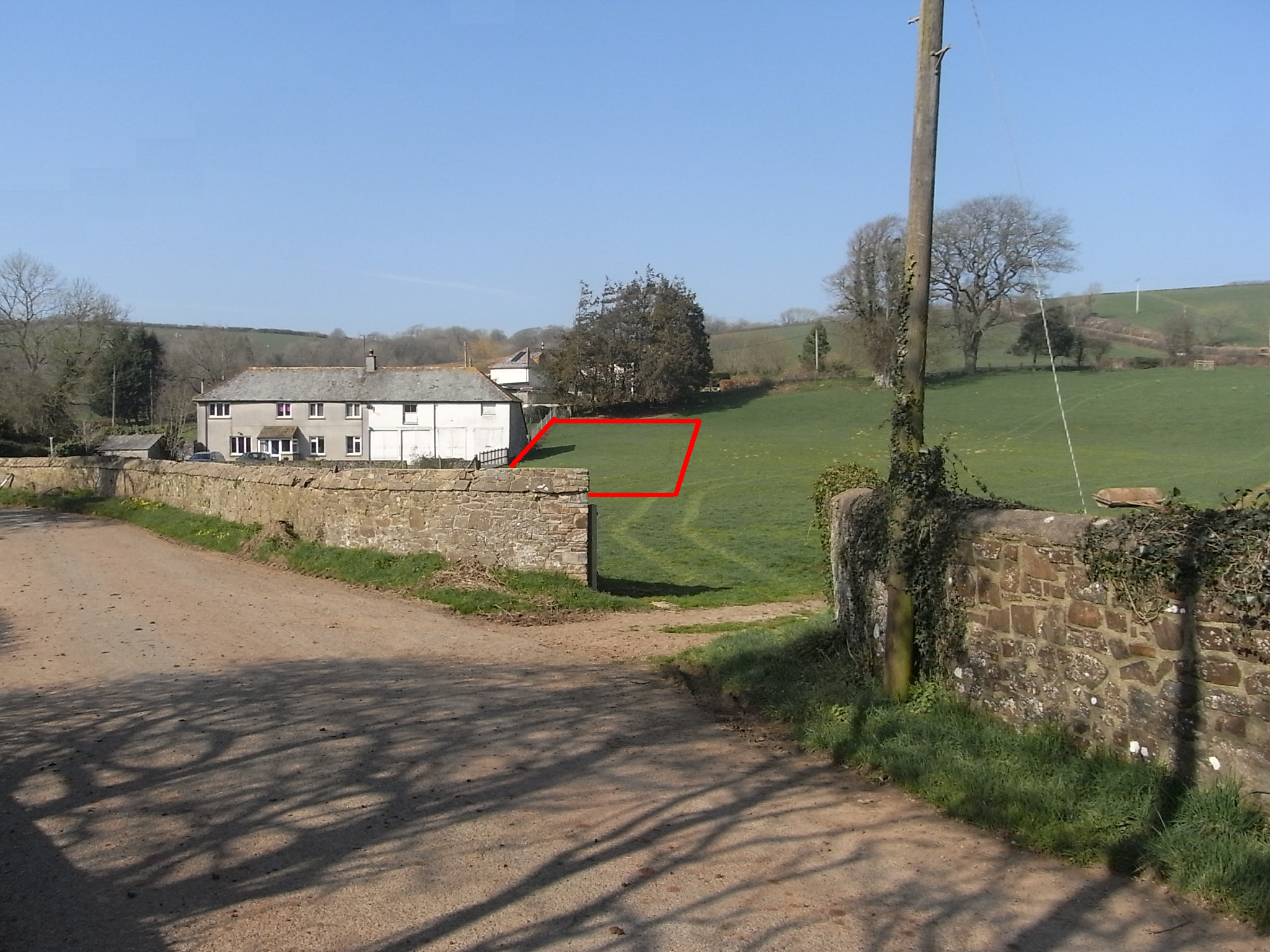
Approximate footprint (marked in red) of Yeo Vale House, demolished in 1973. (Note: View from west. The remaining building is the former stable-block, converted in 1962 by the Westaway family to a farmhouse, now called Yeo Vale cottages.)

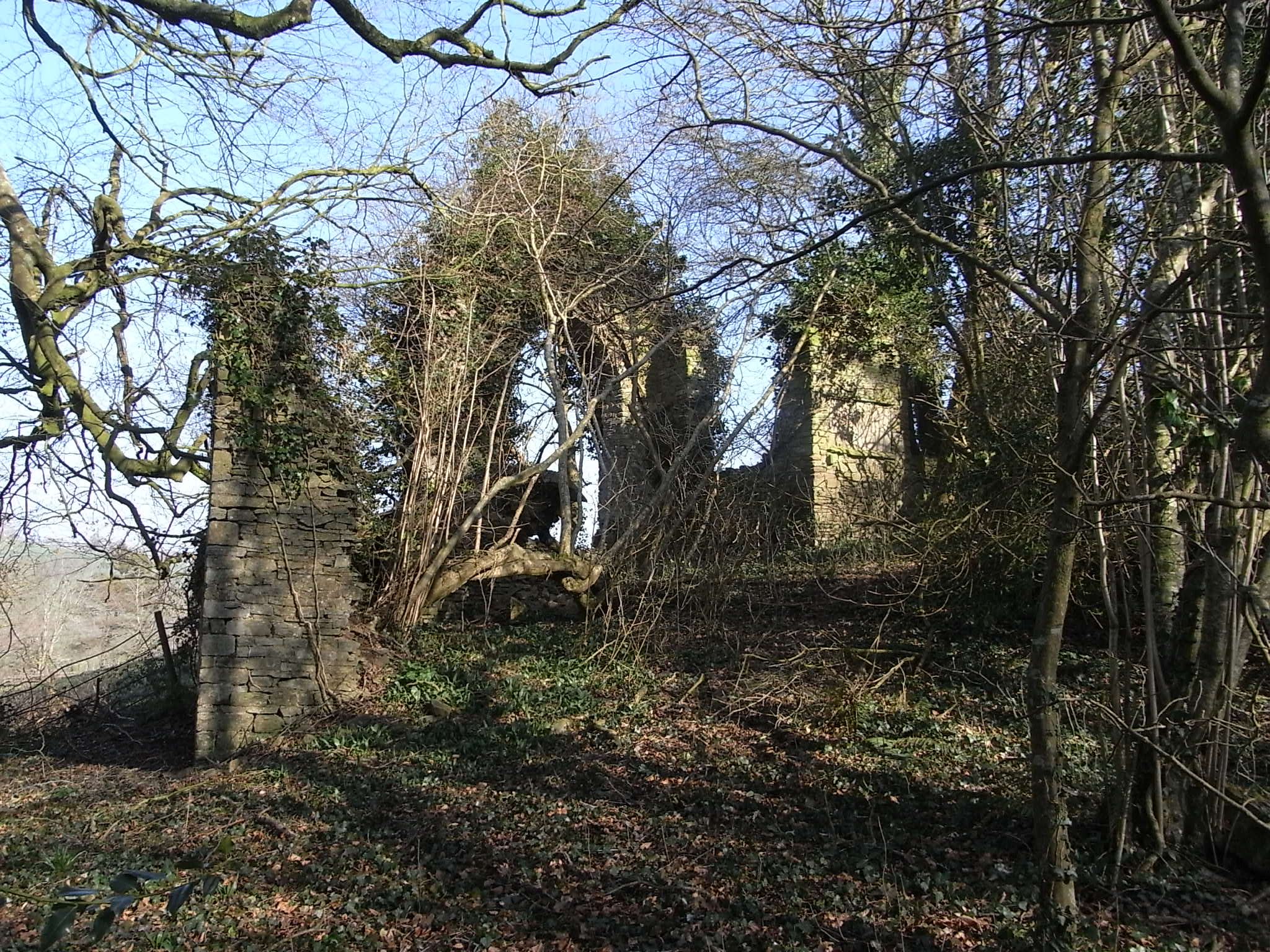
Ruins of mediaeval chapel formerly attached to Yeo Vale House, licensed by the Bishop of Exeter in 1375 and again in 1408, dismantled early 19th century and removed to present location on a hill 1/4 mile south of house to create a folly. Looking eastwards into chancel. On the right-hand pier is the tomb-stone dated 1400 to a member of the Giffard family referred to in the Survey of Devon by Risdon.

Yeo Vale (anciently Yeo) is an historic estate in the parish of Alwington in North Devon, England. The grade II listed mansion house known as Yeo Vale House, situated 1 mile east of Alwington Church and 3 miles south-west of Bideford, incorporating a 15th-century gatehouse, was demolished in 1973, having been abandoned as a residence in 1938 and having fallen into a dilapidated state. it was situated in the valley of the River Yeo, a small river flowing into the River Torridge immediately above Bideford. The barton or farmhouse survives, to which was attached the mansion house, together with various out-buildings and stone walls. A private mediaeval chapel was formerly attached to the mansion house and in the early 18th century was demolished and rebuilt as a folly on a hill about 1/4 mile south of the mansion house. It survives today as a ruin overgrown with trees and ivy.

== Descent ==
The estate is not mentioned in the Domesday Book of 1086.

=== at Yeo ===
The earliest known holder was the at Yeo (alias atte Yeo) family, which took their surname from the estate. The last male member of the family was Thomas at Yeo, who left a daughter and sole heiress Jone at Yeo (according to Pole (died 1635)) or Sir Walter at Yeo, who left a daughter and sole heiress Emma at Yeo (according to Vivian, 1895). Both sources agree however that the heiress Jone or Emma married Geoffrey Giffard, who was living in 1439, to the descendants of which marriage passed the estate of Yeo. Robert atte Yo is recorded in the Devon Lay Subsidy of 1332. It is not known if the at Yeo family was related to the prominent Yeo family, who bore arms Argent, a chevron between three mallards azure, which prospered in North Devon in various branches, most notably at Heanton Satchville, Petrockstowe until the 16th century, at nearby Huish until the late 18th century and at Fremington House until 1880.

=== Giffard ===
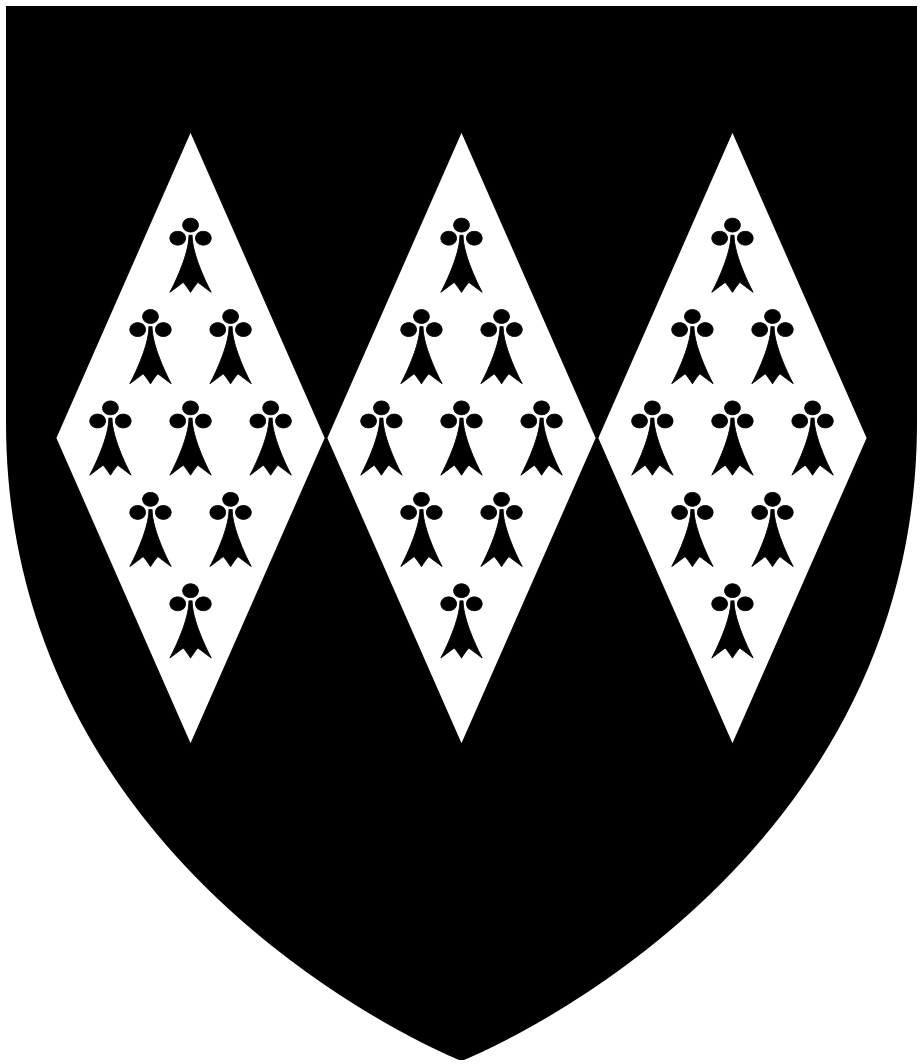
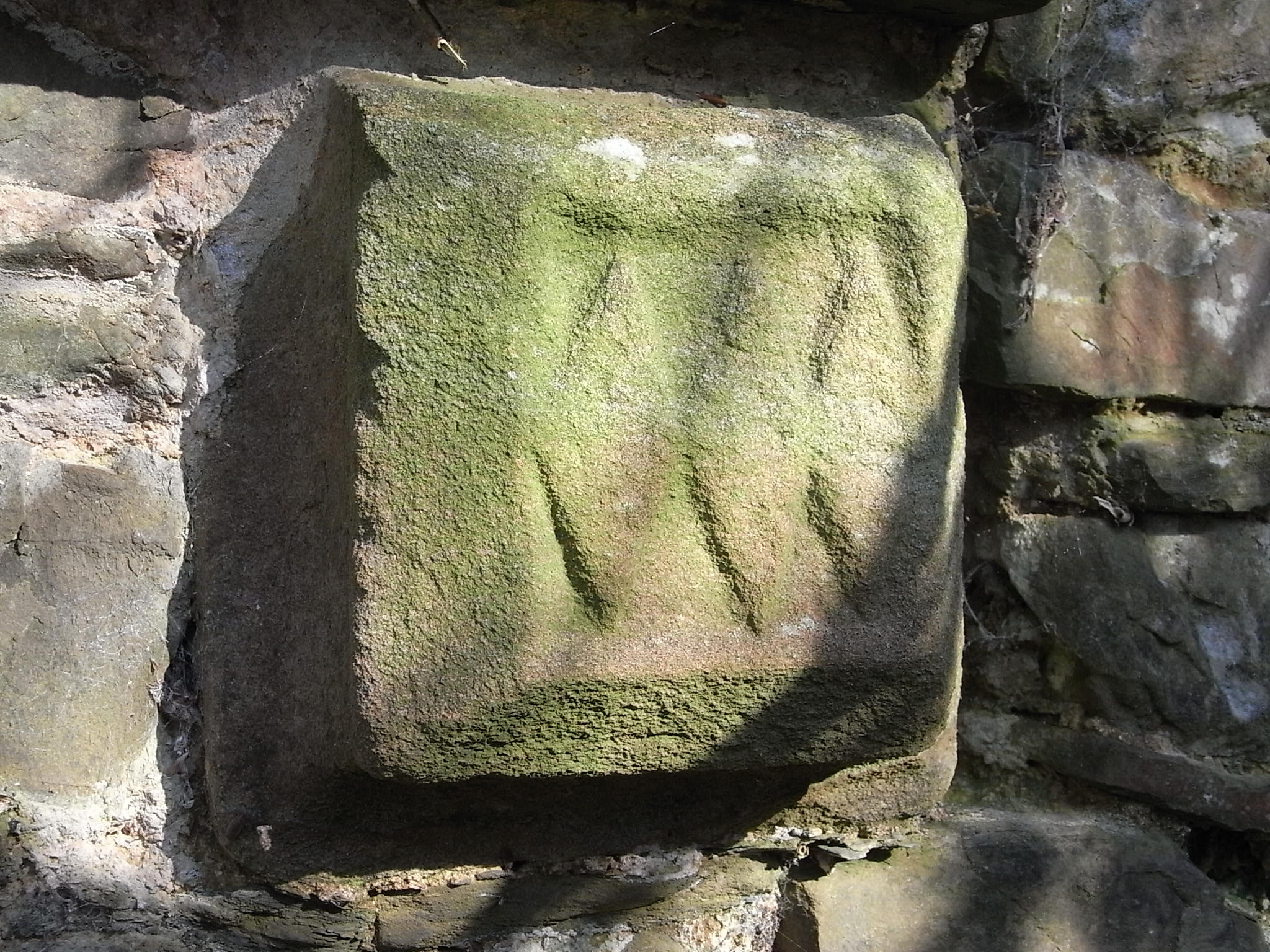
Left: Arms of Giffard of Yeo & Halsbury: Sable, three fusils conjoined in fesse ermine; right: Mediaeval relief-sculpted stone showing arms of Giffard family of Yeo, in ruined mediaeval Yeo Vale Chapel

Monumental brass of Wilmota Giffard (d.1581), heiress of Giffard of Yeo, first wife of Sir George Cary of Cockington. St Saviour's Church, Tor Mohun

The Giffard family of Yeo was a parallel branch of the more prominent and longer-lived Giffard family of Halsbury in the parish of Parkham, North Devon, about 1 mile south-west of Yeo. The Giffard family of North Devon was descended from the Anglo-Norman magnate Walter Giffard, 1st Earl of Buckingham (died 1102), Lord of Longueville in Normandy. His descendants, via a female branch which adopted the surname Giffard, in the 13th century held lands in Devon including the manors of Whitchurch, Wear Giffard, Clovelly Lamerton and Awlescombe. Branches of the family later were seated at Halsbury, Yeo, Brightley in the parish of Chittlehampton, at Tapeley and at Milton Damerell.

- Geoffrey Giffard (fl.1439), who married Emma or Jone at Yeo, the heiress of Yeo. He was the son of Simon Giffard (fl.1410), by his first wife Emma de Bowey, a daughter and co-heiress of John de Bowey, and was 5th in descent from Walter Giffard of Clifford, whose nephew was Bartholomew Giffard (fl.1290) of Halsbury, the first of the family seated at Halsbury, which estate he obtained by marriage to the heiress of Peter de Halsbury.
- John Giffard (son), who married a certain Isabella.
- Robert Giffard (son), who married Radigand (Latinized to Radigunda) Dennis, daughter and sole heiress of Gilbert Dennis of Gidicott (about 9 miles south of Yeo) in the parish of Bradford, Devon, and lord of the manor of Bradford. Gilbert Dennis was the eldest son of Thomas Dennis (by his first wife Alice Bamfield) of Holcombe Burnell in South Devon, himself the son of Walter Dennis of Gidicott. The Dennis family is first recorded in Devon in the 12th century, one branch at Orleigh, about 1 mile south of Yeo, and the other at Gidicott. Both branches had armorials containing three Danish battle-axes, supposedly referring to their Danish origins. The arms of Dennis of Orleigh Azure, three Danish battle-axes or survive in a fragment of ancient stained glass in the Yeo Vale Chapel forming the north transept of Alwington Church. The arms of the Dennis family of Gidicott (whose ancestors were the Giffards of Halsbury) and later of Holcombe Burnell were: Ermine, three Danish battle axes gules.
- John Giffard (died 1487) (eldest son and heir), who married Joan Cooke, daughter of Christopher Cooke of Thorne and died without children.
- Leonard Giffard (born 1467) (younger brother and heir), who married Lucy Tremayle, daughter of Thomas Tremayle, Justice of the Common Pleas.
- Thomas Gifford (died 1536) (eldest son and heir), who married twice, firstly to Katherine Chudleigh, daughter of James Chudleigh and secondly to Elizabeth Dennis, a daughter of William Dennis of Orleigh, Sheriff of Devon in 1466. In 1528 his younger brother William Giffard was appointed Rector of Bradford, which manor and advowson the family had earlier inherited from the Dennis family of Gidicott.
- John Giffard (died 1540/1) (son, by father's first wife Katherine Chudleigh), who married Margaret Milliton, daughter of John Milliton of Meavy. She survived her husband and remarried to Robert Cary (died 1586), lord of the manor of Clovelly, 7 miles west of Yeo, a magistrate who died of jail fever at the Black Assize of Exeter 1586 and whose monument survives in Clovelly Church. He left an infant daughter as his sole heiress, Wilmot Giffard (born 1541), successively the wife of John Bury (1540–1574) lord of the manor of Colleton, Chulmleigh (whom she divorced) and of Sir George Cary of Cockington. John Bury was aged 3 at the death of his father and became a ward to a person unknown. He was said by Pole to have been "simple". He married twice, firstly when both parties were aged only 13, contrary to ecclesiastical law, to Wilmot Giffard, without children. He was divorced from her by Archbishop of Canterbury Matthew Parker in 1560 and she remarried to Sir George Cary (1541–1616) of Cockington, South Devon, Lord Deputy of Ireland, and half-nephew of her step-father Robert Cary of Clovelly.

=== Cary ===
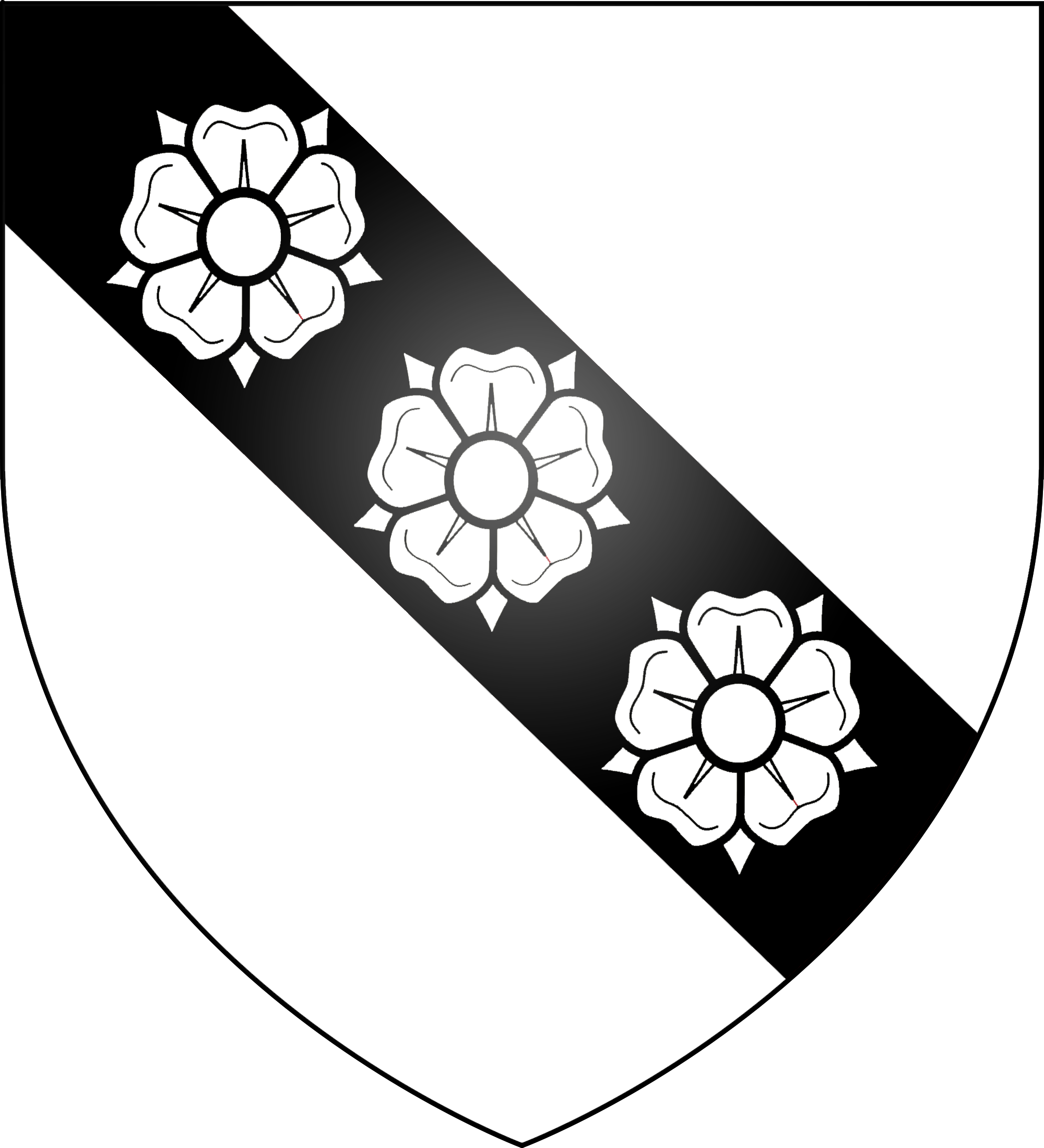
Arms of Cary: Argent, on a bend sable three roses of the field

- Sir George Cary (1541–1616) of Cockington, who married as his first wife Wilmot Giffard (born 1541), heiress of Yeo, by whom he had children two daughters, who died without issue, and two sons who also died without issue, namely Thomas Cary and Sir George Cary, who was killed in the Irish Wars and predeceased his father. he married secondly to Lettice Rich, daughter of Robert Rich, 1st Earl of Warwick (1559–1619), without issue. His heir to his seat of Cockington was his nephew George Cary, 5th son of his younger brother John Cary of Dudley, Staffordshire, and husband of Elizabeth Seymour, a daughter of Sir Edward Seymour, 1st Baronet (died 1613), grandson of Edward Seymour, 1st Duke of Somerset, Lord Protector. His heir to Yeo Vale, however, was Sir Edward Cary of Dungarvon, Ireland, the second son of his younger brother John Cary of Dudley
- Sir Edward Cary (died 1654) of Dungarvon, Ireland, and of Bradford, Devon (elder nephew). He was knighted in Ireland in 1625 by his cousin Henry Cary, 1st Viscount Falkland. He died in 1654 and was buried in Marldon Church, South Devon. "In the east window of the south aisle are some remains of old glass, bearing the arms of the Cary family. In the chancel are several old tombstones, one, with an inscription in memory of Edward Cary, bears the date 1654" (Stabb). He married Margaret Blackhurst of Lancashire, whose monument survives in Marldon Church.
- Sir George Cary (died 1678)(eldest son and heir), of Torr Abbey, South Devon, which he purchased in 1662.

=== Bruton ===
In about 1683 Yeo Vale was sold by the Cary family to John Bruton, whose descendant William Bruton in 1769 sold it to Rev. Hooper Morrison.

=== Morrison ===
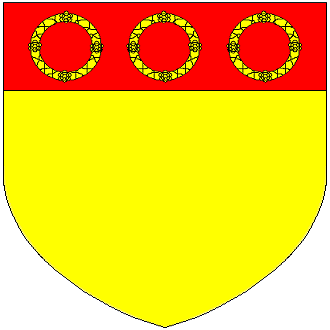
Arms of Morrison: Or, on a chief gules three chaplets of the first

The Morrison family of Yeo Vale bore the same armorials as Sir Charles Morrison, 1st Baronet (1587–1628) of Cashiobury House in Watford, Hertfordshire.

==== Rev. Hooper Morrison (1737–1798) ====
Rev. Hooper Morrison (1737–1798), purchased Yeo Vale from William Bruton. He was the only son of Rev. Thomas Morrison by his wife Elizabeth Hooper, daughter of Sir Nicholas Hooper (1654–1731) of Fullabrook, Braunton and Raleigh, Pilton in Devon, Tory Member of Parliament for Barnstaple 1695-1715. In 1795 he acquired from Richard Bennett-Coffin (died 1796), lord of the manor of Alwington, a lease for one life of Ley Mills and of the waste ground near Alwington Church for the erection of a stable. Long after his death, his daughters in 1836 (as recorded by a surviving inscribed stone tablet) erected on this land Alwington Schoolhouse, which survives today. The stables are today a house ("The Old Stables"). He married Charlotte Orchard (1735–1791), daughter of Paul Orchard (died 1740) of Kilkhampton, Cornwall and Hartland Abbey, Devon. Her mural monument survives in the Yeo Vale Chapel in Alwington Church. She was the sister of Paul Orchard (1739–1812) of Hartland Abbey, who bequeathed the Abbey to her son and his nephew Rev. Thomas Hooper Morrison (1768–1824).

===== Monument to wife =====
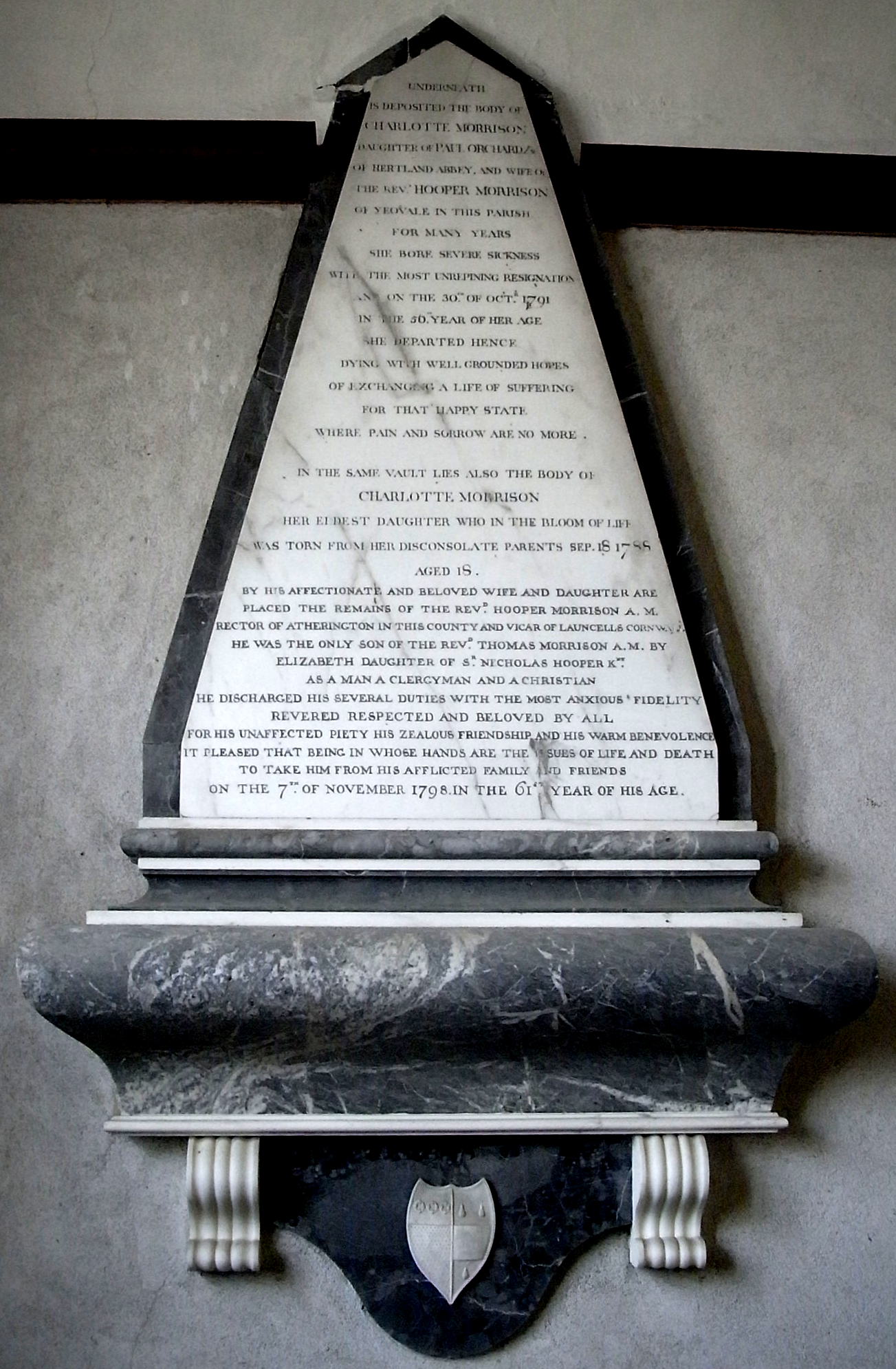
Mural monument to Charlotte Orchard, wife of Rev. Hooper Morrison. Yeo Vale Chapel, Alwington Church

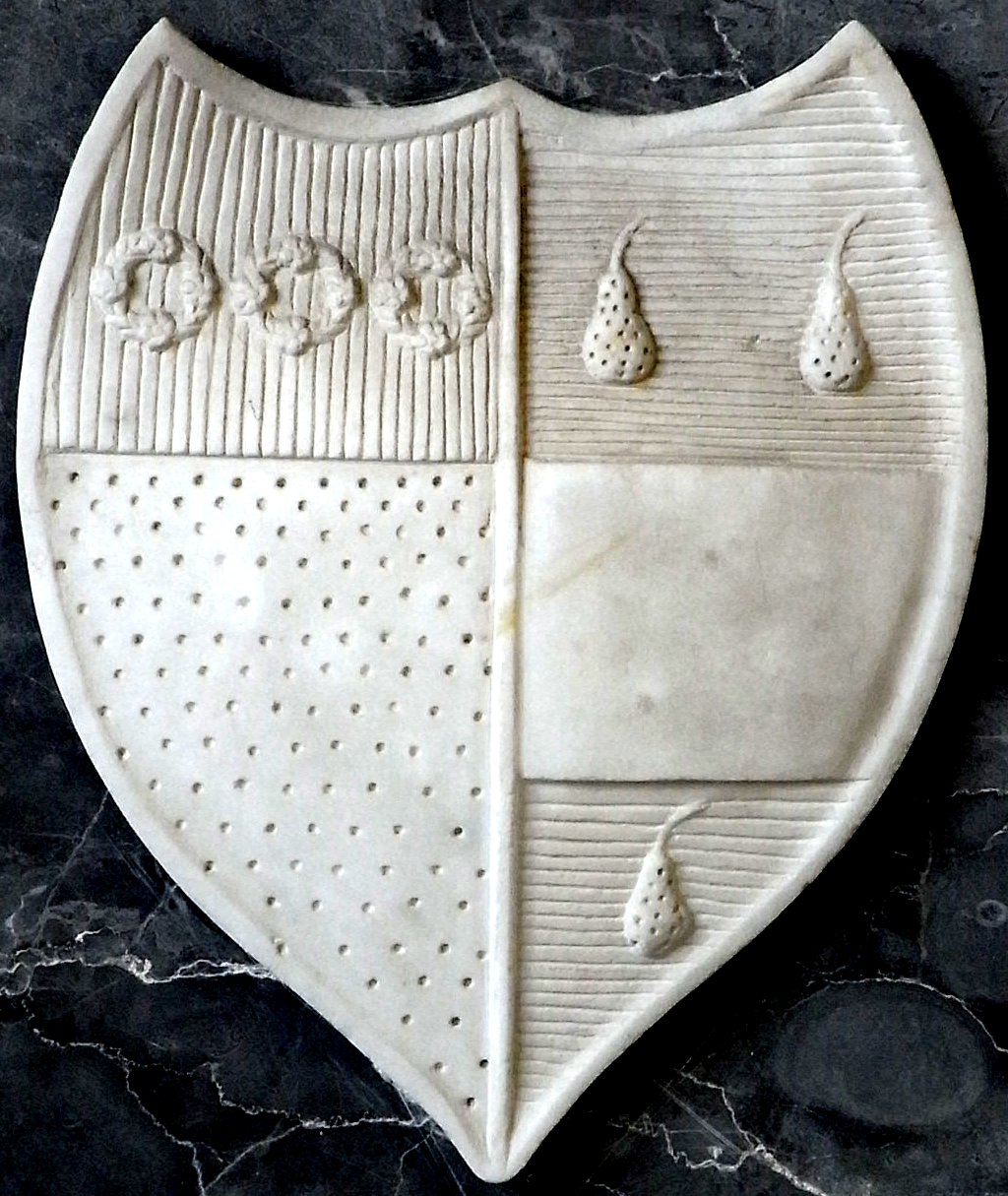
Escutcheon showing hatched arms of Morrison impaling Orchard. Detail from Charlotte Orchard's mural monument. (Note: Arms: Or, on a chief gules three chaplets of the first (Morrison) impaling Azure, a fess argent between three pears pendant or (Orchard))

A mural monument to Charlotte Orchard (1735–1791) survives in the Yeo Vale Chapel of Alwington Church, in the shape of an obelisk, inscribed as follows:

Underneath is deposited the body of Charlotte Morrison daughter of Paul Orchard Esq. of Hertland (sic) Abbey and wife of the Rev. Hooper Morrison of Yeo Vale in this parish for many years. She bore severe sickness with the most unrepining resignation and on the 30th of Oct^{r} 1791 in the 56th year of her age she departed hence dying with well grounded hopes of exchanging a life of suffering for that happy state where pain and sorrow are no more.

In the same vault lies also the body of Charlotte Morrison her eldest daughter who in the bloom of life was torn from her disconsolate parents Sep. 18 1788 aged 18.

By his affectionate and beloved wife and daughter are placed the remains of the Rev^{d} Hooper Morrison A.M., rector of Alwington in this county and Vicar of Launcells, Cornwall. He was the only son of the Rev^{d} Thomas Morrison A.M., by Elizabeth daughter of S^{r} Nicholas Hooper K^{nt}. As a man, a clergyman and a Christian he discharged his several duties with the most anxious fidelity. Revered, respected and beloved by all for his unaffected piety, his zealous friendship and his warm benevolence, it pleased that Being in whose hands are the (is)sues of life and death to take him from his afflicted family and friends on the 7th November 1798 in the 61st year of his age

==== Rev. Thomas Hooper Morrison (1768–1824) ====
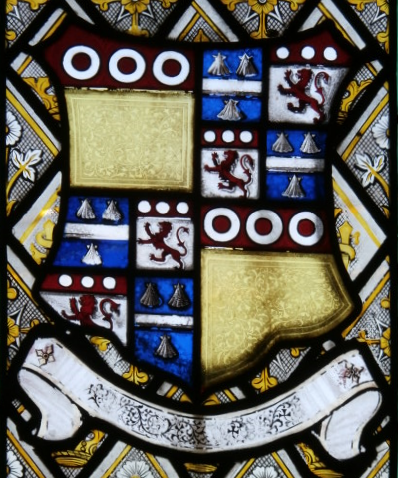
Arms of Rev. Thomas Hooper Morrison, detail from 1861 Eleanora Hammett memorial window, Yeo Vale Chapel, Alwington Church. (Note: Arms: Quarterly of 4, 1& 4: Or, on a chief gules three chaplets of the first (Morrison, here shown with annulets argent not chaplets or); 2&3: quarterly of 4: 1&4: Azure, a fess between three escallops argent (erroneous arms of Orchard, which should be: Azure, a fess argent between three pears pendant or); 2&3: Argent, a lion rampant gules on a chief of the last three plates (erroneous, for Smith Baronets of Isleworth, Middlesex, of which family was the mother of Paul Orchard), should be: Azure, a lion rampant or on a chief argent a mullet gules between two torteaux)

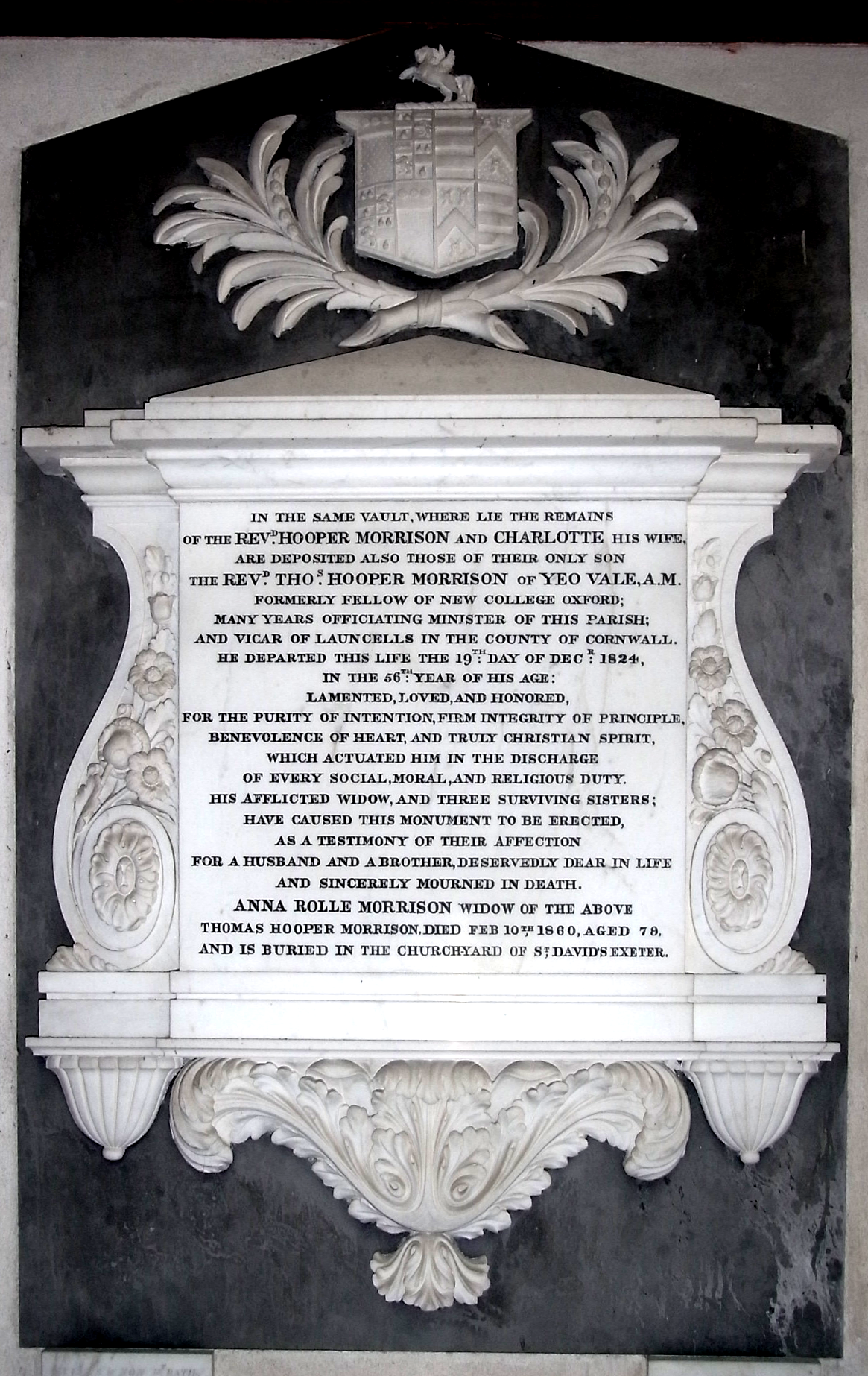
Mural monument to Rev. Thomas Hooper Morrison, in Yeo Vale Chapel of Alwington Church

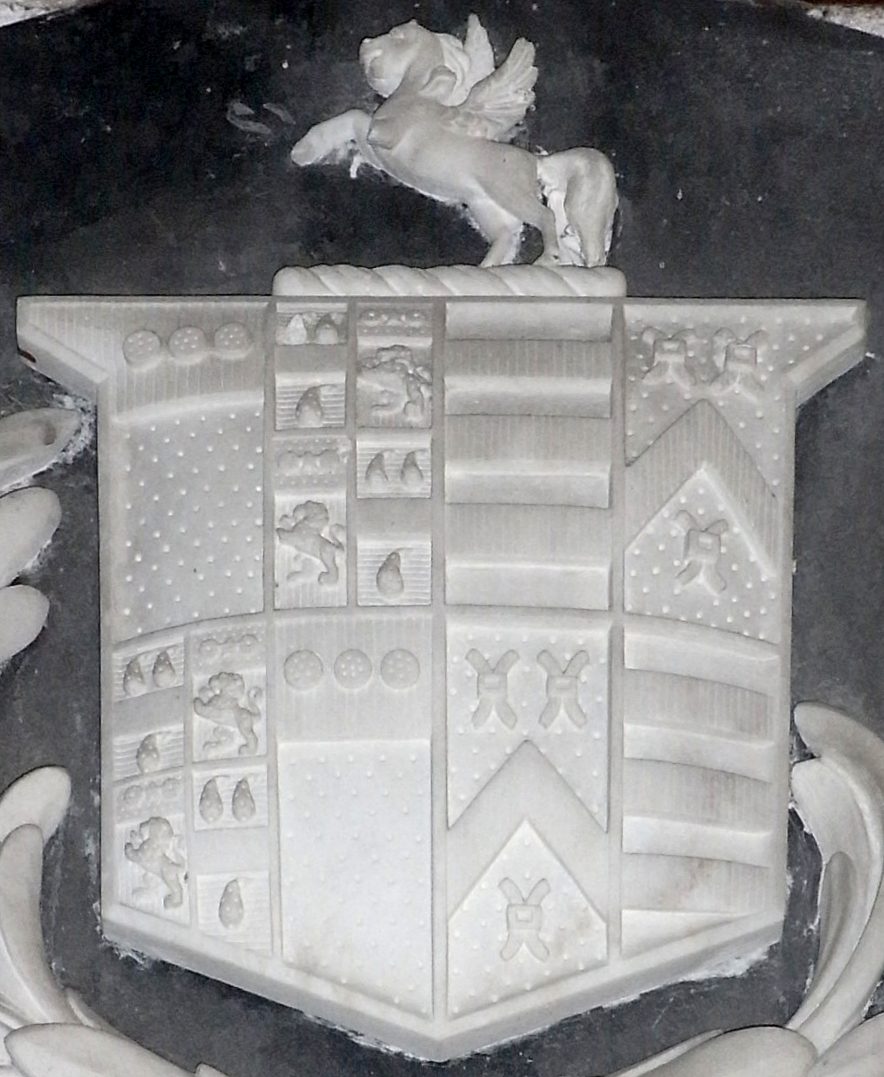
Arms of Rev. Thomas Hooper Morrison (quartering Orchard) impaling arms of Wollocombe, his wife's family. Detail from his mural monument.

Rev. Thomas Hooper Morrison (1768–1824) (son), a Fellow of New College, Oxford (MA 1794), a JP for Devon, Rector of Alwington and in 1799 appointed Vicar of Launcells, Cornwall, by his uncle Paul Orchard. He was bequeathed Hartland Abbey, Devon, by the will of his uncle Paul Orchard (1739–1812) of Hartland Abbey, but never lived there as it was occupied by Orchard's widow Bettina Lawley until her death in 1833. He also owned the estates of Gallsham in Hartland and Alderscombe, Kilkhampton, Cornwall, the ancient seat of the Orchards. He married Anna Rolle Wollocombe (1781–1860), daughter of Thomas Stafford Wollocombe (1741–1814), Colonel of the Devonshire Militia and Lt-Col. of the 2nd Foot Regiment (The Queens), of Bridestowe, Devon. He is remembered for the rousing sermon he gave in Hartland Church on Sunday 21 December 1794, during a time of great fear of a possible invasion by French Revolutionaries, to the newly formed North Devon Volunteers, at the request of that regiment's Lieutenant-Colonel Commandant, his uncle Paul Orchard (1739–1812) of Hartland Abbey (by whom he was later bequeathed Hartland Abbey, and to whom he erected a monument in Hartland Church). It was published shortly afterwards at Exeter under the title The Duty of Arming for the Defence of Our Country in Time of Danger and copies were sold throughout Devon. He warned of the "Political system of this mad infatuated people who are alternately threatening mankind with the contagion of their principles or appalling them with the horror of their crimes" and preached:

... were but some few hundreds of the enemy now to land in any part of the Kingdom where there might be no regularly disciplined forces to guard it (and our own part, situated as we are on the very coast, is as much exposed to an invasion as any) how would it provoke a man of the least feeling and spirit to see ruin and devastation spread on every side by only a handful of them ... to behold, perhaps, the country all around you in flames, your fields laid waste, your houses destroyed, everything valuable plundered from you; to behold your wives and daughters exposed to the brutal lusts of your haughty and insolent conquerors; to see your aged decrepid parents and your innocent helpless children inhumanly treated - perhaps murdered - by a plundering enemy, or exposed to want, to indigence and famine; and to stand yourselves all the while helpless and inactive, tame spectators of the misery... It is given to you now my brethren, to do what ye will then wish for in vain: arm then, arm ye brave; a noble cause, the cause of Heaven, the cause of religion, the cause of your country, the cause of everything that is dear and valuable to you as men, as Englishmen, as Christians, of everything that can contribute to your happiness here and hereafter now demands your zeal and assistance; for the attempts of our neighbours on the Continent are not only to loosen every tie of obedience and to involve us in the wildest anarchy and confusion, but to deny the existence of a God...

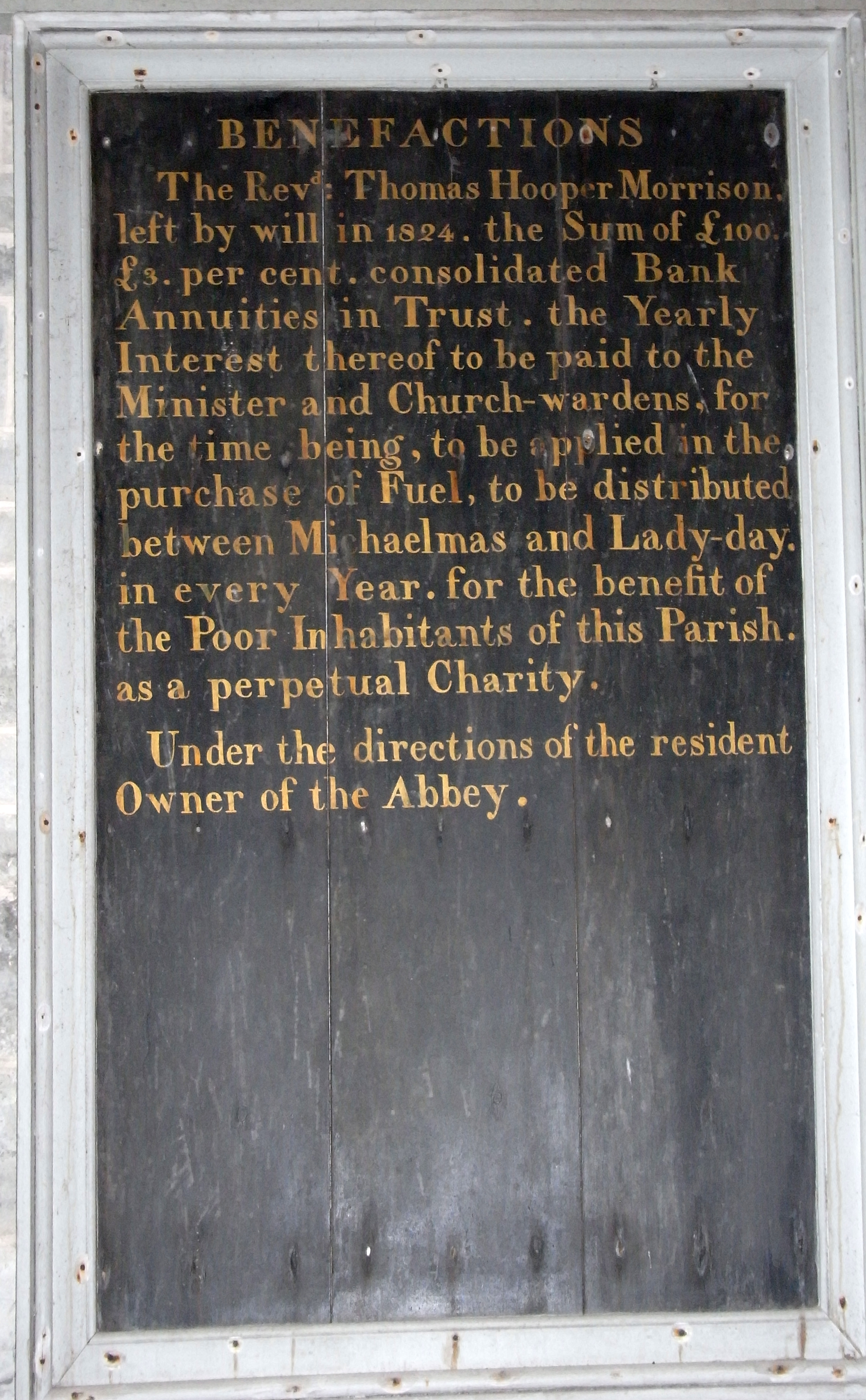
Benefactions board, St Nectan's Church, Hartland, recording the bequest of Rev. Thomas Hooper Morrison

He died in 1824 without male children. Among his charitable bequests was £3 per annum for coals for the poor of Hartland, which is recorded on a large benefactions board (next to a similar one for Paul Orchard) in the tower of St Nectan's Church, Hartland, inscribed as follows:

Benefactions. The Rev^{d} Thomas Hooper Morrison left by will in 1824 the sum of £100 £3 per cent. Consolidated Bank Annuities in trust, the yearly interest thereof to be paid to the Minister and Church-Wardens for the time being to be applied in the purchase of fuel to be distributed between Michaelmas and Lady Day in every year for the benefit of the poor inhabitants of this parish as a perpetual charity. Under the directions of the resident owner of the Abbey

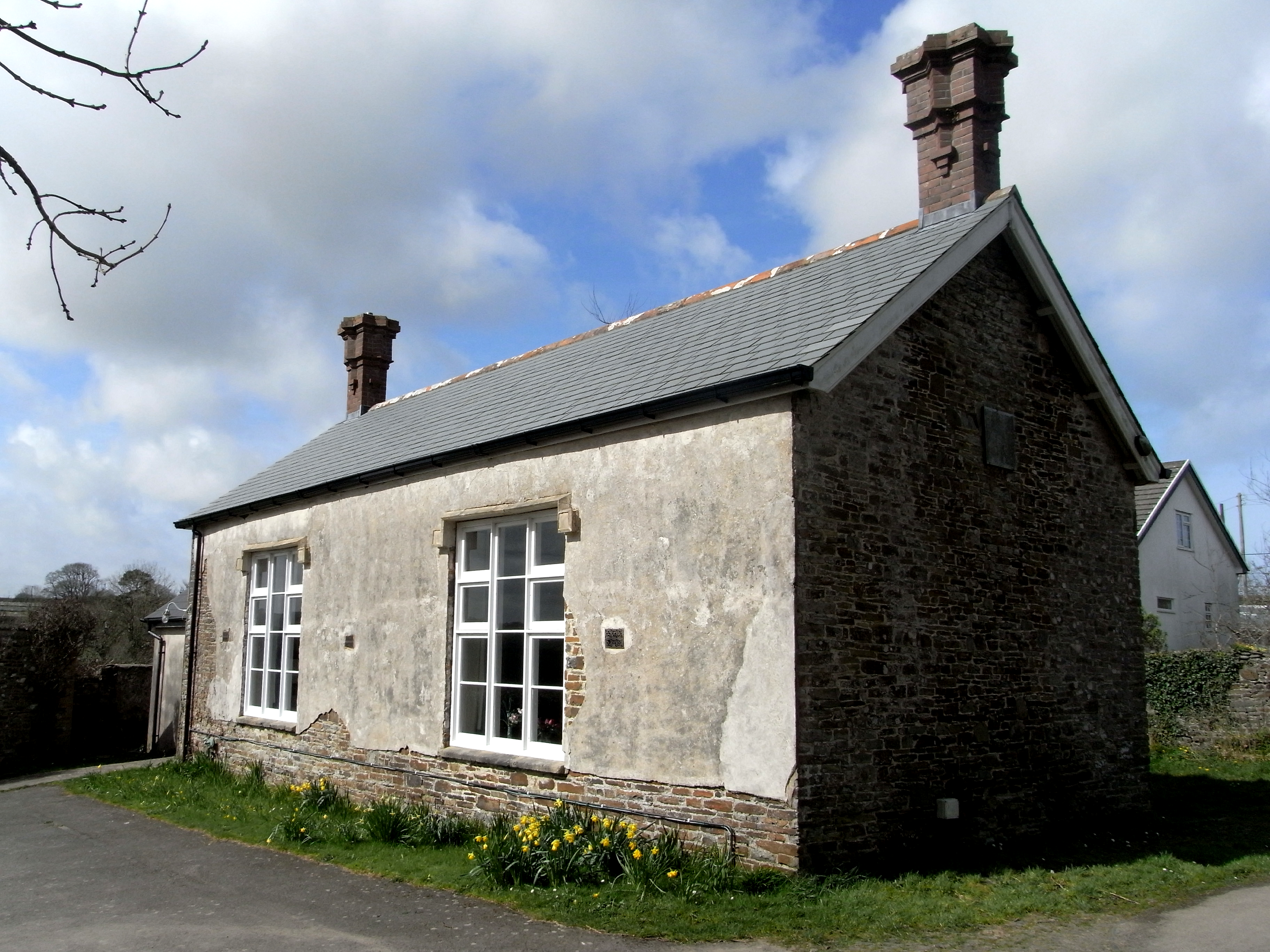
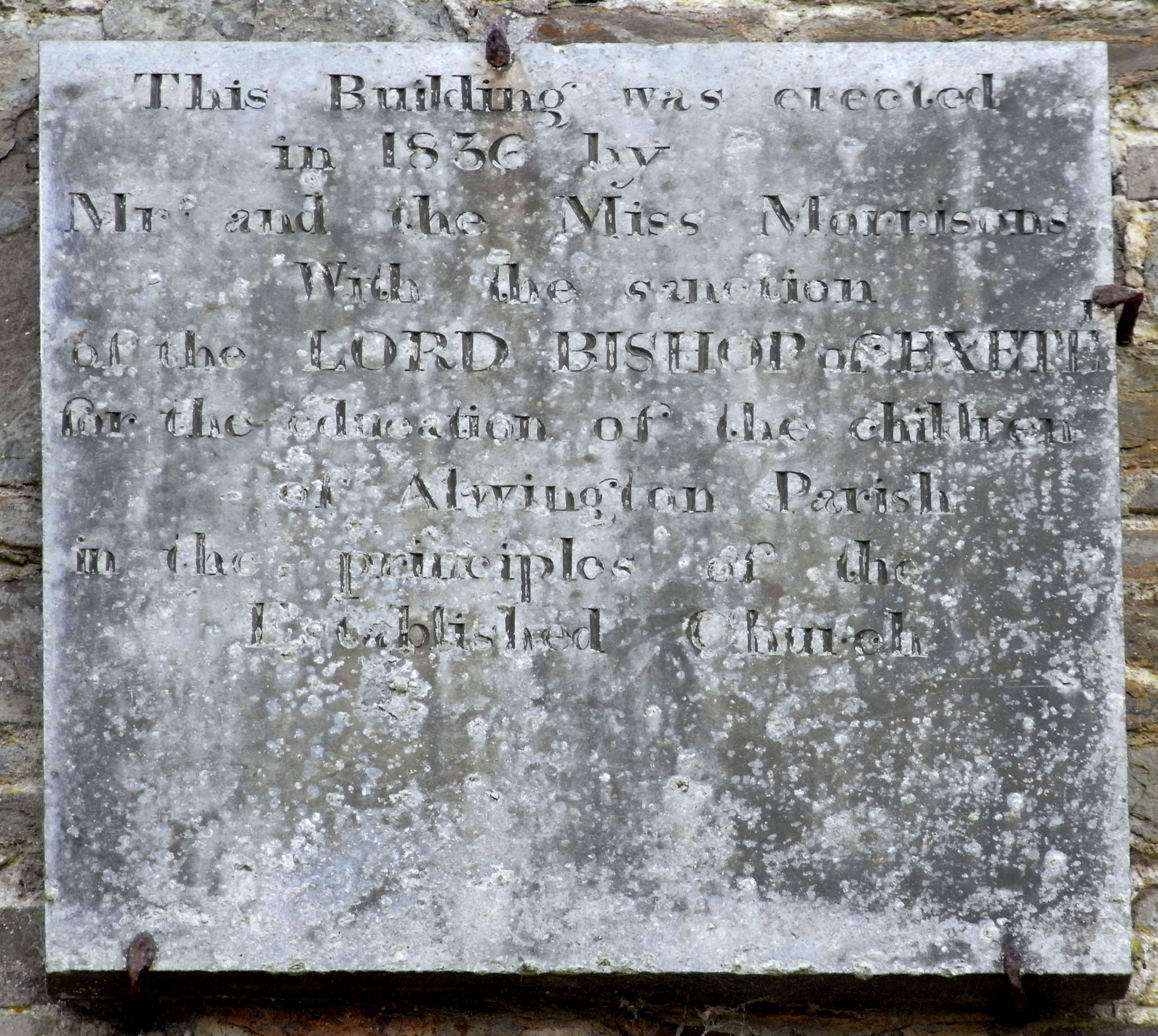
Left: The Schoolhouse, Alwington, erected in 1836 by the widow and sisters of Rev. Thomas Hooper Morrison (1768–1824), as recorded by a stone tablet (right) inscribed: "This building was erected in 1836 by Mr^{s} and the Miss Morrisons with the sanction of the Lord Bishop of Exeter for the education of the children of Alwington parish in the principles of the Established Church"

In 1836 his widow and three surviving sisters built Alwington Schoolhouse, next to the parish church, as is recorded on an inscribed date stone. Hartland Abbey passed by entail to his cousin Lewis William Buck (1784–1858), of Moreton House (alias Daddon House), near Bideford, MP for Exeter 1826-32 and for North Devon 1839-57, the grandson of his mother's sister Anne Orchard (1730–1820), wife of George Buck (1731–1794) of Daddon. Yeo Vale, however, passed to his sister Elizabeth Rebecca Orchard Morrison (died 1840), wife of Capt. James Hammett (1782–1851), Royal Horse Artillery, of 18 Lansdowne Crescent, Bath, the son of Rev. Richard Hammett (1736–1796), Rector of Clovelly (whose mural monument survives in Clovelly Church) and brother of Sir James Hamlyn, 1st Baronet (1735–1811), born James Hammett, lord of the manor of Clovelly. James Hammett was heir to the estate of Gore Court, Otham, Kent, property of his mother Priscilla Hendley, daughter and heiress of William Hendley (1686–1762) of Gore Court.

=== Hammett ===
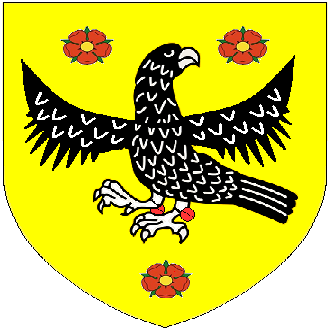
Arms of Hammett: Or, a falcon sable belled gules between three roses gules leaved vert

The Hammett family originated in the parish of Woolfardisworthy neat Clovelly. Rev. Richard Hammett (1736–1796) was the younger son of Richard Hammett (1707–1766) of Kennerland, in the parish of Clovelly (or Woolfardisworthy), Devon, by his wife Elizabeth Risdon (1710–1787), daughter and sole heiress of Philip Risdon, Gentleman. The mural monument to his parents survives in Holy Trinity Church, Woolfardisworthy.

- Capt. James Hammett (1782–1851), Royal Horse Artillery, who married the heiress of Yeo Vale, Elizabeth Rebecca Orchard Morrison (died 1840). He had by her two daughters, Dora Charlotte Hammett (died 1835), who died unmarried, and Eleanora Elizabeth Morrison Hammett (1821–1861), who in 1838 at Bath Abbey married John Townsend Kirkwood.

=== Kirkwood ===
==== John Townsend Kirkwood (1814–1902) ====
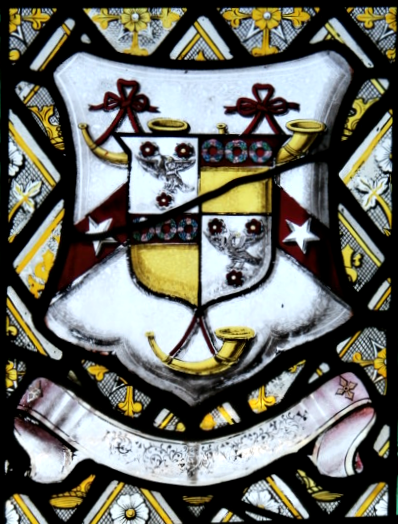
Arms of John Townsend Kirkwood (1814–1902) with inescutcheon of pretence of Hammett, for his wife Eleanora Elizabeth Morrison Hammett (1821–1861), heiress of Yeo Vale. Detail from 1861 Eleanora Hammett memorial window, Yeo Vale Chapel, Alwington Church. (Note: Arms: Argent, on a chevron gules between three bugle-horns or stringed of the second three mullets of the first (Kirkwood). Inescutcheon: Quarterly of 4: 1 & 4: Or, a falcon sable belled gules between three roses gules leaved vert (Hammett, with field shown here argent instead of or); 2 & 3: Or, on a chief gules three chaplets of the first (Morrison))

John Townsend Kirkwood (1814–1902), of Glencarha, County Mayo, Ireland, 34 Imperial Square, Cheltenham, Gloucestershire, and Boldrewood, Burghfield Common, Berkshire, later JP for Devon, who married the heiress of Yeo Vale and of Gore Court, Eleanora Elizabeth Morrison Hammett (1821–1861). He owned the Customs House at Bideford (apparently inherited via the Orchards) and land in the Devon parishes of Alwington, Littleham, Parkham, Beaford, Swimbridge, Hartland, Cheriton Fitzpaine and Cadeleigh. He was the only surviving son of Col. Tobias Kirkwood (1779–1859), of the 40th and 64th Regiments, of Castleton, County Mayo, Ireland, (who had served in New Brunswick, Canada) by his wife Catherine (Amelia) Coffin (born New Brunswick, Canada, died 1881), daughter of General John Coffin (1751–1838), Governor of St John's, New Brunswick, 3rd son of Nathaniel Coffin, Cashier of the Customs at Boston, Massachusetts, and brother to Admiral Sir Isaac Coffin, 1st Baronet (1759–1839). John Coffin was a descendant of the ancient Coffin family of Portledge, lords of the manor of Alwington (in which parish was situated Yeo Vale), and married Ann Matthews (died 1839, buried at Bath, daughter of William Matthews of St John's Island, South Carolina. The Kirkwood family became established in western Ireland in the early 17th century, and by the early 18th century were seated at Castleton and Moyne Abbey, County Mayo. In 1770 Andrew Kirkwood (died 1810) purchased Castletown Manor in Sligo from John Knox, and was succeeded by his son Samuel Kirkwood, himself succeeded by his brother Tobias Kirkwood (died 1839/59) in 1837. John Townsend Kirkwood inherited in 1839 and sold to Thomas Jones on 8 June 1839 The arms of Kirkwood were: Argent, on a chevron gules between three bugles or stringed of the second three mullets of the first. In 1876 John Townsend Kirkwood "of Cheltenham", owned 8,345 acres in county Mayo and 444 acres in county Sligo. His brass memorial tablet survives in the Yeo Vale Chapel of Alwington Church inscribed as follows:

"To the memory of John Townsend Kirkwood late of Yeo Vale formerly of the Royals and 64th Reg^{ts}. Born 7th Oct^{r} 1814 died in Tenerife Jan^{y} 10th 1902 and was buried there".
By his wife Eleanora Hammett he had eight sons and three daughters:

- Major James Morrison Kirkwood (1839–1907), of Yeo Vale, eldest son and heir, Royal North Devon Yeomanry. (see below)
- Townsend Molloy Kirkwood (1842–1919), second son, of the Bengal Civil Service, who inherited Gore Court from his mother. He married Ellen Pleydell-Bouverie, a relative of the Earl of Radnor, but died without issue, when Gore Court was inherited by his next younger brother.
- Hendley Paul Kirkwood (1844–1920), third son, of Newbridge House, Bath and of Gore Court, who married Charlotte Fell and died without issue.
- William Montagu Hammett Kirkwood (1850–1926), fourth son, a barrister who married twice but died without issue. He inherited Gore Court on the death of his elder brother Hendley.
- John Andrew Hammett Kirkwood (1854–1855), fifth son, died young.
- Sir Walter Guy Coffin Kirkwood (1856–1935), sixth son, of Gore Court, Secretary to the Post Office for Scotland. His descendants inherited Gore Court.
- Col. Carleton Hooper Morrison Kirkwood (1860-post 1937), seventh son, of the Wiltshire Regiment.
- Lt-Col. Richard Hammett Kirkwood (1861–1928), eighth son, of the Devonshire Regiment

==== James Morrison Kirkwood (1839–1907) ====
Major James Morrison Kirkwood (1839–1907) (eldest son and heir), of Yeo Vale, Royal North Devon Yeomanry. In 1871 he married Isabel Brockman (died 1926).

==== John Hendley Morrison Kirkwood (1877–1924) ====
Lt-Col. John Hendley Morrison Kirkwood (1877–1924), DSO, (eldest son and heir), of Yeo Vale. He served as a JP for Devon and as Conservative Member of Parliament for South East Essex (1910–12). He was Lt-Col. of 1st Royal Irish Rifles and a Captain in the Royal North Devon Hussars. He served in the Boer War and in World War I in the 4th Dragoon Guards, the Ist Life Guards and in the Household Battalion. In 1902 he married Gertrude Lyle, eldest daughter of Sir Robert Park Lyle, 1st Baronet (1859–1923) of Greenock. By March 1916 he sold 4,000 acres of his County Mayo estate and his Sligo estate to the Congested Districts' Board.

==== Sir Robert Lucian Morrison Kirkwood (1904–1984) ====
Sir Robert Lucian Morrison Kirkwood, KCMG, (1904–1984) (eldest son and heir). He married Sybil Attenborough, daughter of Edward Attenborough of Hertford House, Nottingham. In about 1928, shortly after his father's death, he sold Yeo Vale to Stephen Berrold and in 1937 lived at 7 Eaton Place, Belgravia, London. His other residences were Haven House, Sandwich, Kent, and Craigton, Irishtown, Jamaica. His only son Francis Lyle Kirkwood (1933–2008) died aged 75 on 20 August 2008 in Botswana, killed on safari in a mini-bus accident.

=== Berrold ===
In about 1928 Yeo Vale was purchased by Stephen Berrold, described by Lauder (1981) as "a strange, shadowy figure, possibly part foreign, described as the local mystery-man, with strange comings and goings, and 'dark people' to wait on him". He had lived in Palestine, from where he brought his staff, including a Persian chauffeur and two Arabic or Muslim maids. he was believed by locals to have been a Secret Service Agent, or a foreign spy. He did not mix with the local North Devon gentry, but always invited the villagers to Yeo Vale for an annual Christmas party and gave generous presents to the local children. He kept a private aircraft at Stibb Cross, which on occasion he piloted to London. He was nevertheless described by his long-term gardener as "always a gentleman to us". He had an argument (concerning the felling of trees) with John Westaway, the farmer who occupied the barton adjoining the mansion house, and in 1938 he moved to Stodden Park, near Petersfield in Hampshire, having deserted Yeo Vale never to return. His wife died soon after, which greatly affected him. He packed all her clothes into her Buick car and ordered his chauffeur to drive it off a cliff at Stodden Park, which he refused to do, upon which Berrold buried it in a pit and set it alight. He later married a French woman and moved to Africa. He retained ownership of the building, which was "literally abandoned and left to die... It stood for many years deserted and empty, gazing forlornly out across the fields, like a dog patiently waiting for its master to return. But he never did". The house soon became dilapidated, but nevertheless was given a grade II listing in 1955, and Mr Westcott obtained a licence from the local council to demolish it in 1973.

=== Westaway ===
The estate of Yeo Vale is now owned by the Westaway family, who operate there a large dairy cattle farm. It is believed the site of Yeo Vale house is still owned by the heirs unknown of Stephen Berrold.
