= George Carey (Lord Deputy) =

Member of the Parliament of England

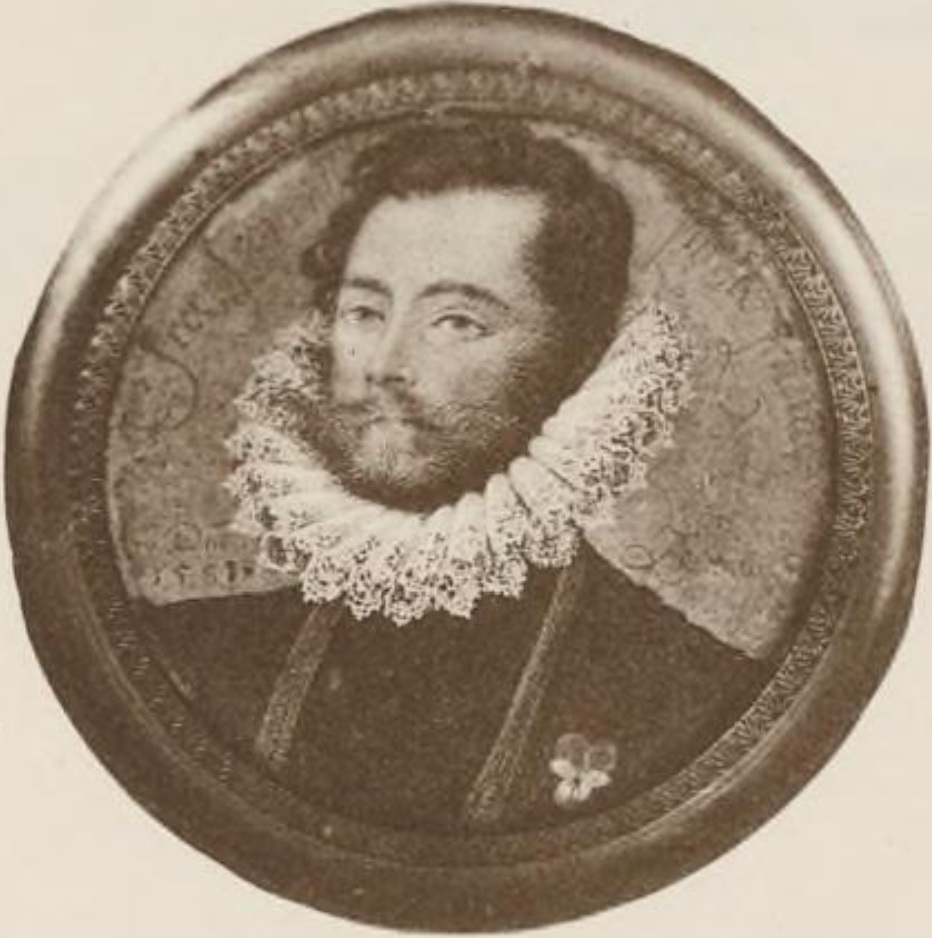
Sir George Cary, miniature portrait dated 1581 by Isaac Oliver

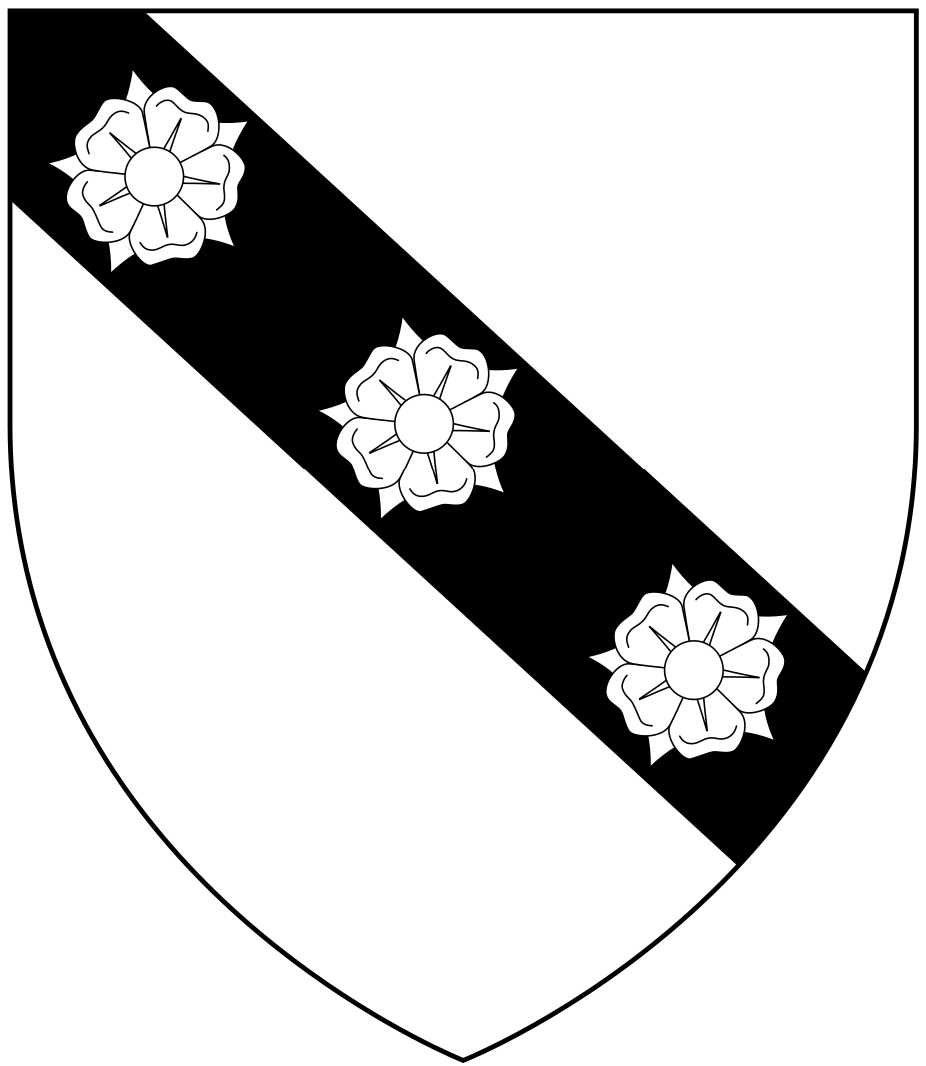
Arms of Cary: Argent, on a bend sable three roses of the field

Sir George Carey (or Cary; (Note: Many sources refer to him as "Cary", but the Oxford Dictionary of Biography and History of Parliament use "Carey".) c. 1541 – 15 February 1616), JP, DL, of Cockington in the parish of Tor Mohun in Devon, England, was Lord Deputy of Ireland from May 1603 to February 1604.

He should not be confused with his near namesake and second cousin Sir George Carew, later Earl of Totnes, who also held posts in Ireland at the same period.

== Origins ==
He was the eldest son and heir of Thomas Cary (died 1567) lord of the manor of Cockington, by his wife Mary Southcott, a daughter of John Southcott of Indio, Bovey Tracey, Devon, who was a clerk of the peace. Thomas Cary's Easter Sepulchre type monument survives in St Saviour's Church, Tor Mohun. Thomas Cary was the second son of Robert Cary (died 1540), lord of the manor of Clovelly in Devon.

== Career ==
After education at the Inner Temple (1558), Cary became captain of the Devon militia by 1572, a Justice of the peace from c. 1579, and deputy lieutenant from 1587. He was Member of Parliament for Dartmouth in 1586, and for the county seat of Devon in 1588. He was treasurer-at-war to Robert Devereux, 2nd Earl of Essex during his campaign in Ireland in 1599 and was appointed a Lord Justice in September 1599 (when Essex left the country) and again, in 1603 (on the departure of Charles Blount, 8th Baron Mountjoy).

In 1601, Cary was responsible for the introduction of a newly debased Irish coinage and was accused in the Exchequer of Pleas of enriching himself in the process. Although the case was prolonged for several years nothing was ultimately proven, which may explain the words free from all filthy fraud that are inscribed on Isaac Oliver's miniature portrait of him (illustrated above).

== Marriages and children ==
Monumental brass of Wilmota Giffard (d.1581), first wife of Sir George Cary. St Saviour's Church, Tor Mohun

Cary married twice:

Firstly in about 1561, to Wilmota Giffard (1540/1–1581), daughter and sole heiress of John Giffard of Yeo Vale, Alwington, North Devon, and step-daughter of Robert Cary (died 1586) of Clovelly, Devon, half-uncle to Sir George Cary. Cary was her second husband; she was previously the wife of John Bury (1540–1574) of Colleton in the parish of Chulmleigh, Devon, whom she had married when both parties were aged only 13, and contrary to ecclesiastical law. Bury was said by Pole to have been "simple", and the couple were divorced in 1560 by Matthew Parker, Archbishop of Canterbury. Her monumental brass survives in St Saviour's Church, Tor Mohun. Its inscription states that she had two sons and three daughters by Carey. These included:

- Thomas Cary, died childless;
- Sir George Cary, killed in the Irish Wars and stated by Risdon (died 1640) to have been "a great commander in the wars". He predeceased his father and died childless;
- Jana Cary, died childless;
- Anna Cary, first wife of Sir Richard Edgcumbe (1571–1639) of Mount Edgcumbe, Cornwall, MP for Grampound and Bossiney. She also died childless.

Secondly Cary married Lettice Rich, a daughter of Robert Rich, 1st Earl of Warwick (1559–1619), they had no children; she remarried to Sir Arthur Lake, MP.

== Succession ==
As his own children all died without issue, his heir to Cockington was his nephew George Cary, the fifth son of his younger brother John Cary of Dudley, Staffordshire, and husband of Elizabeth Seymour, a daughter of Sir Edward Seymour, 1st Baronet (died 1613), of Berry Pomeroy in Devon, grandson of Edward Seymour, 1st Duke of Somerset, Lord Protector and uncle of King Edward VI.

== Quartered arms ==
Quartered arms of Sir George Cary

The arms of Sir George Cary, of four quarters, as displayed on the monumental brass to his first wife and on his father's monument, are as follows:

- 1st: Argent, on a bend sable three roses of the field (Cary, with a crescent for the difference of a second son);
- 2nd: Or, three piles in point azure (Bryan of Tor Bryan, Devon, for Jane de Bryan, a daughter and co-heiress of Sir Guy de Bryan (died 1396) of Tor Bryan, Devon, wife of Sir John Cary;
- 3rd: Gules, a fess between three crescents argent (Holleway of Holway in North Lew, for Margaret Holleway, daughter and heiress of Robert Holleway, wife of Sir John Cary (d.1395) (son of Margaret de Bryan), Chief Baron of the Exchequer);
- 4th: Azure, a chevron argent between three pears pendant or (de Orchard), Sir Philip Cary (died 1437) of Cockington (great-grandfather of Thomas Cary (died 1567) married Christiana Orchard, daughter and heiress of William Orchard of Orchard in Somerset.

== Sources ==
- Willis, Browne (1750). Notitia Parliamentaria, Part II: A Series or Lists of the Representatives in the several Parliaments held from the Reformation 1541, to the Restoration 1660 ... London. p. 1.
- Pole, Sir William (died 1635), Collections Towards a Description of the County of Devon, Sir John-William de la Pole (ed.), London, 1791.
- Vivian, Lt.Col. J.L., (Ed.) The Visitations of the County of Devon: Comprising the Heralds' Visitations of 1531, 1564 & 1620. Exeter, 1895.

Political offices
Preceded by Lord Mountjoy	Lord Deputy of Ireland; 1603–1604	Succeeded by Sir Arthur Chichester
