= Manor of Raleigh, Pilton =

Coordinates: 51.0940°N 4.0507°W

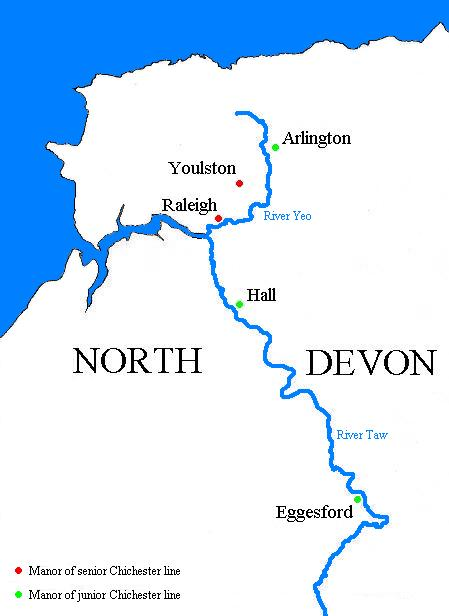
Location of historic Chichester family manors: Raleigh in the parish of Pilton; Youlston in the parish of Shirwell; Arlington; Hall in the parish of Bishops Tawton; Eggesford

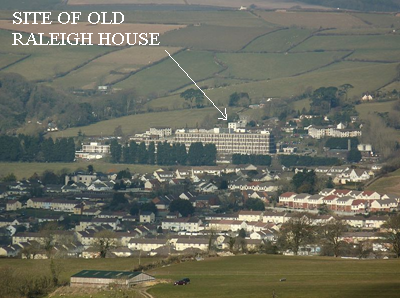
View from south from Codden Hill of site of former manor house of Raleigh, in the parish of Pilton, Devon. It was immediately north of the present large building of North Devon District Hospital

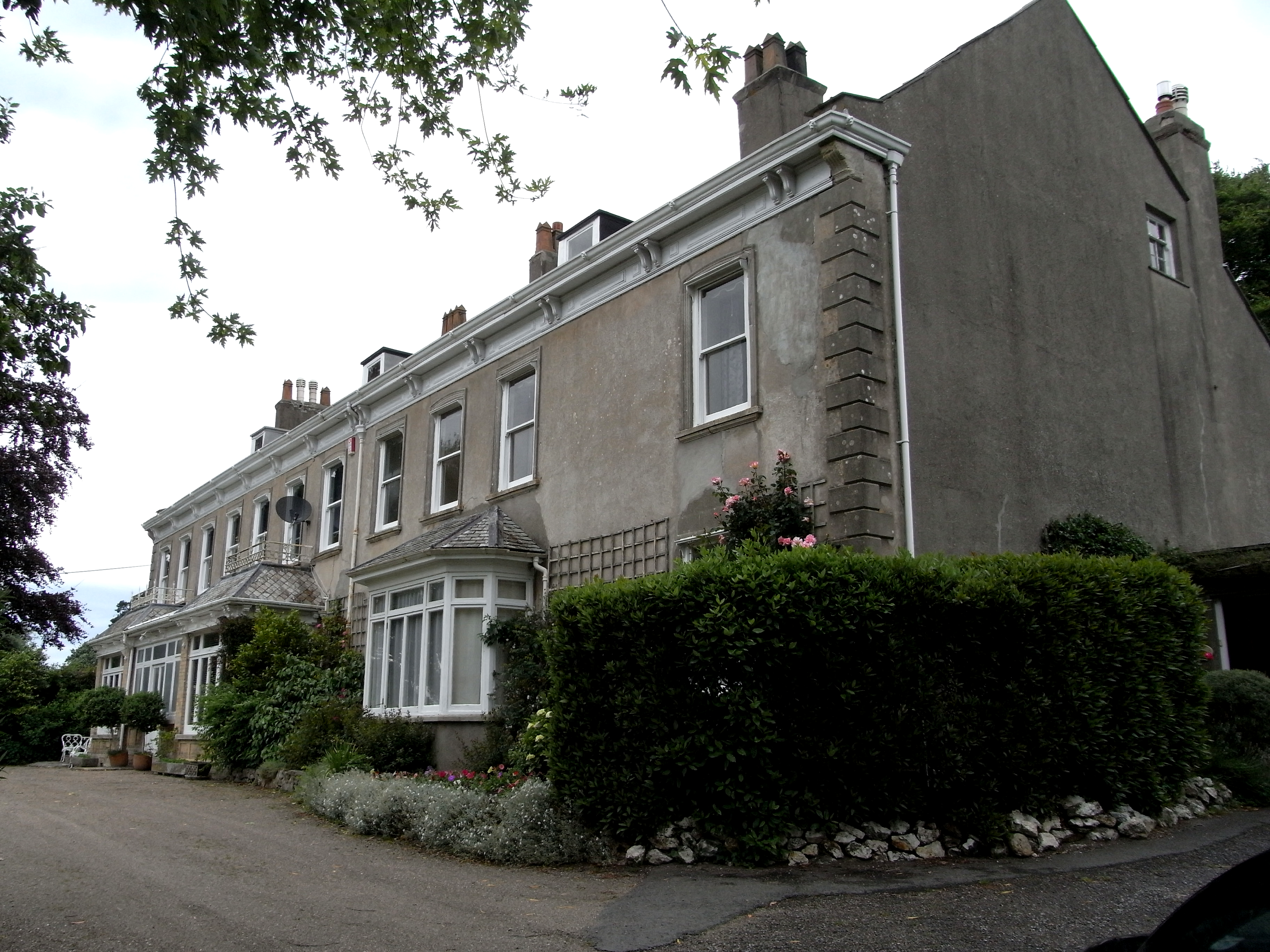
New Raleigh House, built after 1745 by Nicholas Hooper on ground immediately above the site of the ancient manor house of the Chichesters, reported as in ruins in 1745

The historic manor of Raleigh, near Barnstaple and in the parish of Pilton, North Devon, England, was the first recorded home in the 14th century of the influential Chichester family of Devon. It was recorded in Domesday Book of 1086 together with three other manors that lay within the later-created parish of Pilton. The manor lies above the River Yeo on the southern slope of the hill on top of which stand the ruins of the Anglo-Saxon hillfort called Roborough Castle. Part of the historic manor of Raleigh is now the site of the North Devon District Hospital.

Pilton as a borough had existed long before the Norman Conquest and was one of the most important defensive towns in Devon under the Anglo-Saxons; it is now a northern suburb of Barnstaple. On modern maps, an area of the Yeo valley on the eastern edge of Pilton is marked as Raleigh.

== Domesday Book ==
Under the heading Terra(e) Ep(iscop)i Constantiensis ("Lands of the Bishop of Coutances" (Geoffrey de Montbray (died 1093)) and under the sub heading Infra scriptas t(er)ras tenet Drogo de Ep(iscop)o ("The undermentioned lands Drogo holds from the Bishop"), is the following entry for Raleigh, 28th of 99 Devon holding of the Bishop (translated into English): "Raleigh. Brictric held it before 1066. It paid tax for 1/2 hide. Land for 4 ploughs. In lordship 1 plough; 4 slaves; 1 virgate, 4 villagers and 4 smallholders with 1 plough and 1 virgate; meadow 2 acres; pasture 5 acres; woodland 30 acres; 2 cattle; 30 sheep; 16 goats. Value formerly and now 30 shillings". Drogo was probably "Drogo son of Mauger" mentioned in another nearby entry and was one of the Bishop's knights and his largest tenant in Devon, and held about 70 manors from him. On the death of Geoffrey de Mowbray in 1093 his heir was his nephew Robert de Mowbray, Earl of Northumbria (died 1125), who rebelled unsuccessfully against King William II in 1095 and forfeited his lands to the crown. King William II then re-granted most of the de Mowbray lands to Juhel de Totnes (died 1123/30), the first feudal baron of Barnstaple. The manor thus became a constituent part of the Feudal barony of Barnstaple and the barons remained the feudal overlords for many centuries. In the Book of Fees Raleigh was in the same ownership as Challacombe, which was also a Domesday manor held by Drogo from the Bishop of Coutances. In the 19th century Challacombe was sold by the Chichesters to the Fortescues of Filleigh.

== Raleigh family ==
The holders of Raleigh through the 14th century were a family that took its name from the manor, the Raleigh family of Raleigh. The early ancestry of this Raleigh family, along with that of other Devon Raleigh families, has been studied in much depth, largely as a result of enquiries into the origins of the famous Elizabethan adventurer Sir Walter Raleigh, but no clear early pedigree has emerged. This Raleigh family also held the manor of "Auvrington" (Arlington, Devon), as recorded in the Book of Fees, held from the overlord Philip de Culumbars (died 1342), of Nether Stowey, 2nd husband of Eleanor FitzMartin, sister and one of two co-heiresses of William FitzMartin (died 1326), feudal baron of Barnstaple. Arlington was thus also inherited by the Chichesters from Raleigh.

Thomasine Raleigh, daughter and eventual sole heiress of Sir John de Raleigh of Raleigh married Sir John Chichester. Her Inquisition post mortem states that she died on 7 August 1402.

== Chichester ==
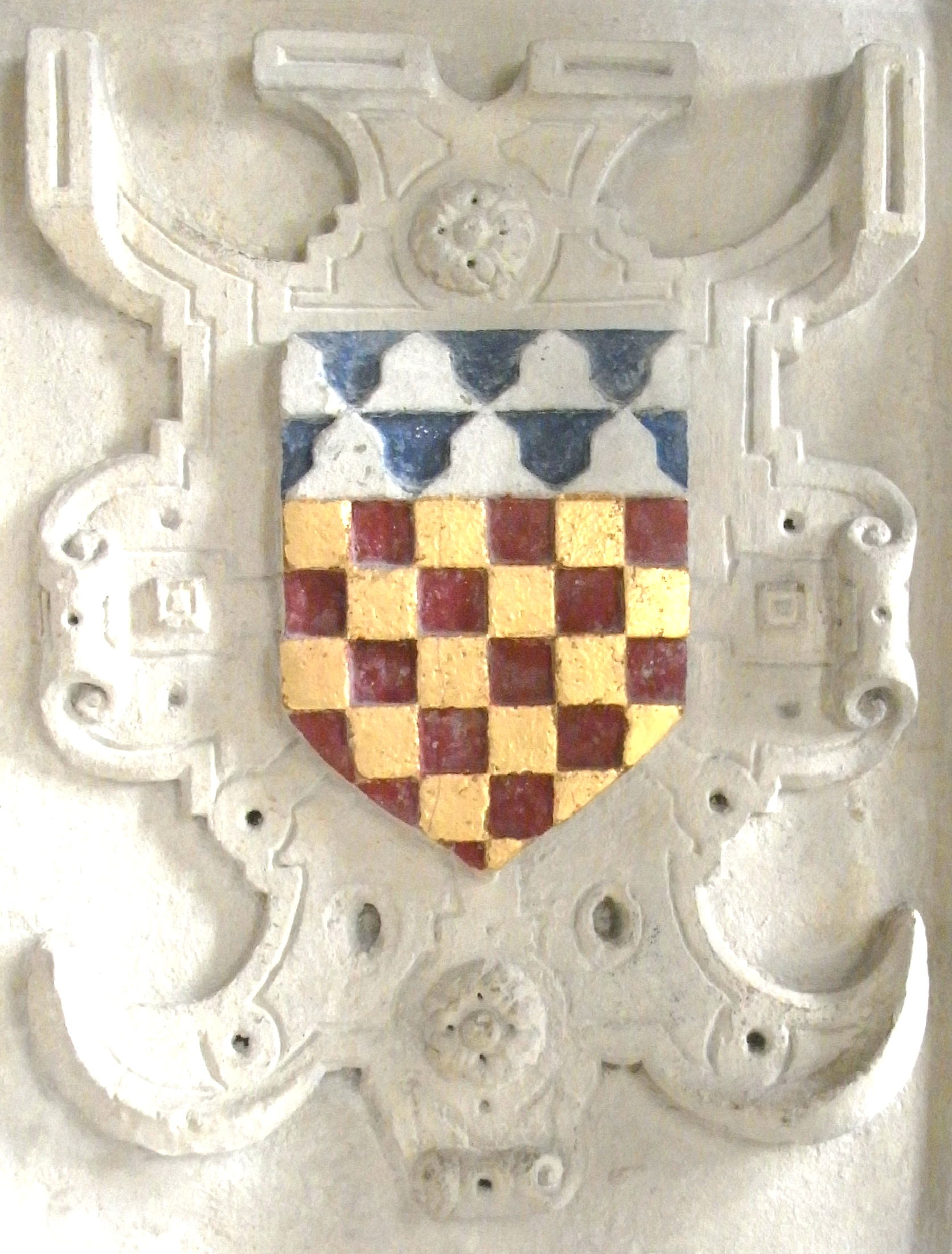
Arms of Sir John Chichester (d.1569), Pilton Church, Devon

John Chichester (fl.1365)
John Chichester (fl.1365) married in about 1365 Thomasine de Raleigh (died 1402), daughter and heiress of Sir John de Raleigh. He was lord of the manors of Treverbin in Cornwall and of Beggerskewish and Donwer in Somerset. According to Sir Alexander Chichester, Bart., he was the son of Sir Roger Chichester, who was knighted in 1346 at the Siege of Calais and later fought at the Battle of Poitiers in 1356. According to the Heralds' Visitation of Devon his father was John Chichester, 7th in descent from Walleran de Cirencester alias Chichester, himself descended from a brother of Robert of Chichester, Bishop of Exeter in 1155–1160. According to the Ledger Book of Tor Abbey, in 1237 Walleran did homage to William de Raleigh for the manor of South Pool.

Sir John Chichester (1385–1437)
Sir John Chichester (1385–1437) (son), who fought in the Battle of Agincourt (1415) in the retinue of the Sieur de Harrington. He married Alice Wotton, daughter and co-heiress of John Wotton of Widworthy. He survived his wife and died 14 December 1437.

Richard Chichester (1423–1496)

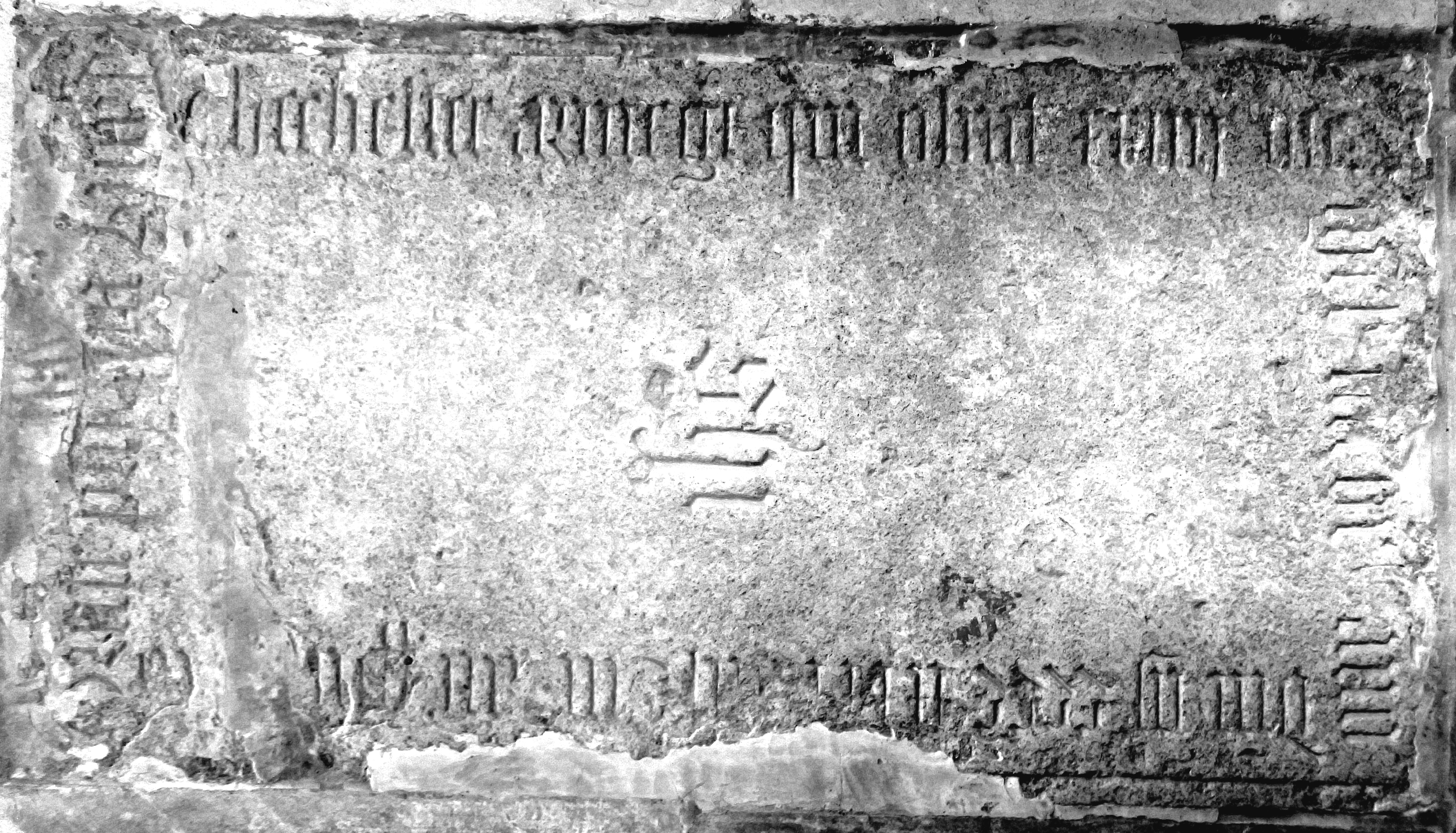
Ledger stone of Richard Chichester (d.1496)

Richard Chichester (1423–1496), (son), was a minor aged 14 on his father's death. He served as Sheriff of Devon in 1469 and 1475. He married firstly Margaret Keynes, daughter of Nicholas Keynes of Winkleigh; secondly Elizabeth Sapcott (died 1502), who survived him, daughter of Sir John Sapcott. He died 25 December 1496 and his Inquisition post mortem was taken in 1498. His tomb slab exists set into the floor of the chancel aisle of Pilton Church. Their second son Richard Chichester married Thomasine de Hall (died 1502), the heiress of Hall, in the parish of Bishops Tawton, and founded that line of the family, whose descendants (in a female line) still own the estate in 2012. His heir was his grandson John Chichester (died 1537/8). He was predeceased by both his sons:
- John Chichester (died 1477) (eldest son by Margaret Keynes), married Thomasine Steyning, who survived him, daughter of William Steyning. Predeceased his father, died without issue.
- Nicholas Chichester (c. 1447 – before 1496), (younger son by Margaret Keynes and heir to his brother), married Christine Paulet

Sir John Chichester (c. 1474 – 1537)
Sir John Chichester (c. 1474 – 1537) (son and heir of Nicholas Chichester (d.pre-1496) and heir to his grandfather), married firstly in about 1490, Margaret Beaumont (died 1507), daughter and co-heiress of Hugh Beaumont of Shirwell by his wife Thomasine Wise. Secondly Joan Brett, sister of Robert Brett (died 1540), lord of the manor of Pilland in the parish of Pilton, and the last steward of Pilton Priory before its dissolution and widow of John Courtenay (died 1510) of Molland; she survived her husband and remarried Henry Fortescue. His will was witnessed by his brother-in-law Robert Brett (died 1540). The manorial account book for Raleigh of the year 1506/7 survives. His eldest son by his second wife Joan Brett was Amyas Chichester (1527–1577), to whom he granted his manor of Arlington, and who established that line of the family, created Chichester Baronets of Arlington Court in 1840.

Sir John Chichester (c.1516/22-1569)
Sir John Chichester (c. 1516/22-1569), (grandson), MP, Sheriff of Devon 1552 and 1557. He was the son of Edward Chichester (c. 1496 – 1522) (second and eldest surviving son of Sir John Chichester (c. 1474 – 1537), whom he predeceased) by his wife Lady Elizabeth Bourchier (d.24 August 1548), a daughter of John Bourchier, 1st Earl of Bath (1470–1539). Lady Elizabeth's monumental brass, depicting a small kneeling figure with separate inscription, exists in St Brannock's Church, Braunton, Devon. Sir John Chichester's elaborate monument (without effigy) exists in Pilton Church. He married Gertrude Courtenay, a daughter of Sir William Courtenay (1477–1535) of Powderham. He obtained from the crown (after having been leased to Richard Duke (died 1572), of Otterton) the rectory, parsonage, glebe, tithes oblations and advowson of the former Pilton Priory, after the Dissolution of the Monasteries. He bequeathed these to his son and heir in his will. These rights had passed under another lease to George Turrell by 1591.

Sir John Chichester (1549–1586)
Sir John Chichester (1549–1586) (eldest son), of Raleigh, Sheriff of Devon in 1576/7. He married Anne Denys, daughter of Sir Robert Dennis (died 1592) of Holcombe Burnell, MP. He died of gaol fever contracted whilst acting as a magistrate at the Lent Black Assizes of Exeter in 1586.

Sir Robert Chichester (1578–1627)
Sir Robert Chichester (1578–1627) (son). His monument with kneeling effigies of himself and his two wives exists in Pilton Church. He married firstly Frances Harrington (died 1615), who received a stately funeral in Pilton church attended by many eminent persons. She was the daughter of John Harington, 1st Baron Harington of Exton (1539–1613) and a co-heiress of her brother John Harington, 2nd Baron Harington of Exton (1592–1614). By her he had a daughter Anne Chichester who married Thomas Bruce, 1st Earl of Elgin (1599–1663). Secondly he married Ursula Hill, daughter of Robert Hill of Shilston.

Sir John Chichester, 1st Baronet (1623–1667)
Sir John Chichester, 1st Baronet (1623–1667) (son by 2nd wife Ursula Hill)

Sir John Chichester, 2nd Baronet (c. 1658 – 1680)
Sir John Chichester, 2nd Baronet (c. 1658 – 1680) (son), died without children.

Sir Arthur Chichester, 3rd Baronet (c. 1662 – 1718)
Sir Arthur Chichester, 3rd Baronet (c. 1662 – 1718) (brother). In 1689 he moved permanently to Youlston Park in the parish of Shirwell, long owned by the family and used as a second seat, inherited by Sir John Chichester (c. 1474 – 1537) from his first wife Margaret Beaumont (died 1507), and sold the manor of Raleigh to Devonshire-born Arthur Champneys, a City of London merchant, who due to his control of Raleigh and its tenants, succeeded him as one of the MP's for the Rotten Borough of Barnstaple in 1690.

== Champneys ==
Arthur Champneys (c.1658–1724) sold Raleigh in 1703 to Sir Nicholas Hooper (1654–1731), his fellow MP for Barnstaple in 1701.

== Hooper ==
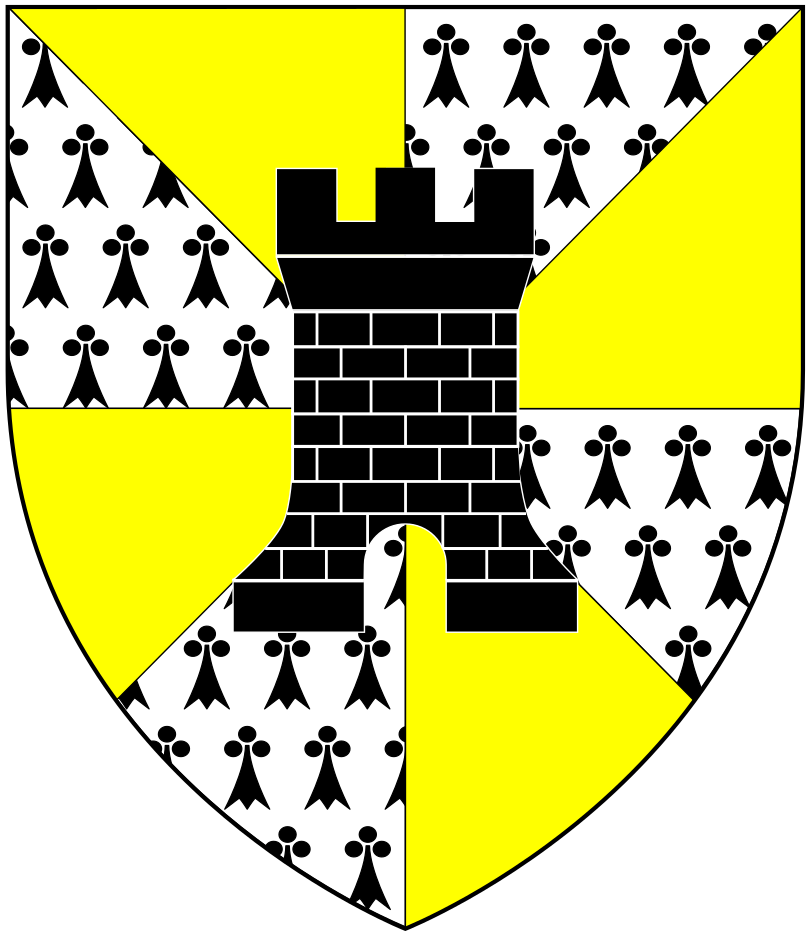
Arms of Hooper

Sir Nicholas Hooper (1654–1731), MP for Barnstaple 1695–1715. In the return to the Dean Milles' Questionnaire of about 1745, the manor house of Raleigh was described as "Rawleigh in Ruins" (in response to the question "Are there any gentlemen's seats and remarkable improvements in the parish?"). His son Nicholas Hooper rebuilt Raleigh House on an adjacent site slightly higher up the hill, which building survives today. Nicholas Hooper married Mary Davie (1688–1762), eldest daughter and co-heiress of Sir William Davie, 4th Baronet (1662–1707) of Creedy in the parish of Sandford, near Crediton in Devon, by his first wife Mary Steadman (died 1690/1), daughter and heiress of ..... Steadman of Downside, Midsomer Norton, Somerset. The marriage was childless.

Nicholas Hooper's heir was his sister Elizabeth Hooper (died 1726), who married John Bassett (1683–1721), of Heanton Punchardon, MP for Barnstaple 1718–1721.

== Courtenay ==
Peregrine Courtenay (1720–1785) was described as "of Raleigh" by Vivian (1895). He was the 3rd son of Sir William Courtenay, 2nd Baronet (1675–1735) of Powderham and was the husband of Lucy Incledon (born 1724), 2nd daughter of Robert Incledon (1676–1758) of Pilton House, Pilton, which adjoins Raleigh to the south.

== Bassett ==
In 1793 Francis Bassett, who never lived at Raleigh, sold some land in Raleigh to Robert Newton Incledon. Incledon sold land in Raleigh in 1885, which was resold in 1894 and again in 1919. In the mid-18th century John Bassett Esq., was the last person to live in the Old Manor House, and appointed Rev. George Foss as chaplain to the private chapel.

== Marriott ==
In 1813 Christopher Marriott, Esq., was resident at Raleigh, as the mural monument he erected in Pilton Church to his sister Georgina Marriott (1791–1813) records.

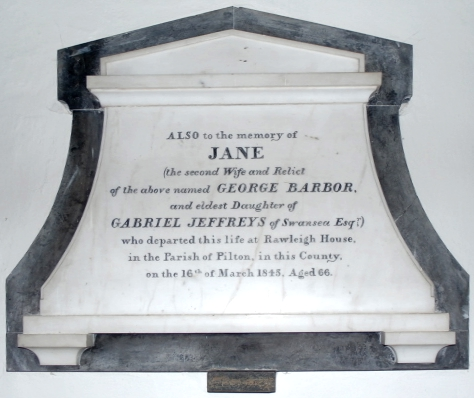
Mural monument in Fremington Church to Mrs Jane Barbor, widow of George Barbor

== Barbor ==
Jane Jeffreys (1779–1845), "Mrs Barbor", the widow of George Barbor (1756–1817) of Fremington House, about three miles (5 km) west of Barnstaple, was resident at "Rawleigh House" from at the latest 1830 until her death in 1845 as is recorded on her mural monument in Fremington Church.

The heir of the Barbor family, lords of the manor of Fremington, was William Arundell Yeo, who is later recorded as a landowner at Raleigh (see below).

== Various ==
The 1843 tithe award showed manor of Raleigh held between three owners:

- William Arundell Yeo (died 1862), 147 acres. He was lord of the manor of Fremington, near Barnstaple, and resident at Fremington House, which manor he had inherited from George Acland Barbor.
- Robert Newton Incledon (of Yeotown, Goodleigh), who held together with William Hodge 160 acres.
- William Hodge, who held together with Robert Newton Incledon 160 acres.

== Sources ==
- Reed, Margaret, Pilton its Past and its People, Barnstaple, 1985 (first published 1977).
- Vivian, Lt.Col. J.L., (Ed.) The Visitations of the County of Devon: Comprising the Heralds' Visitations of 1531, 1564 & 1620. Exeter, 1895.
