= Arthur Champneys =

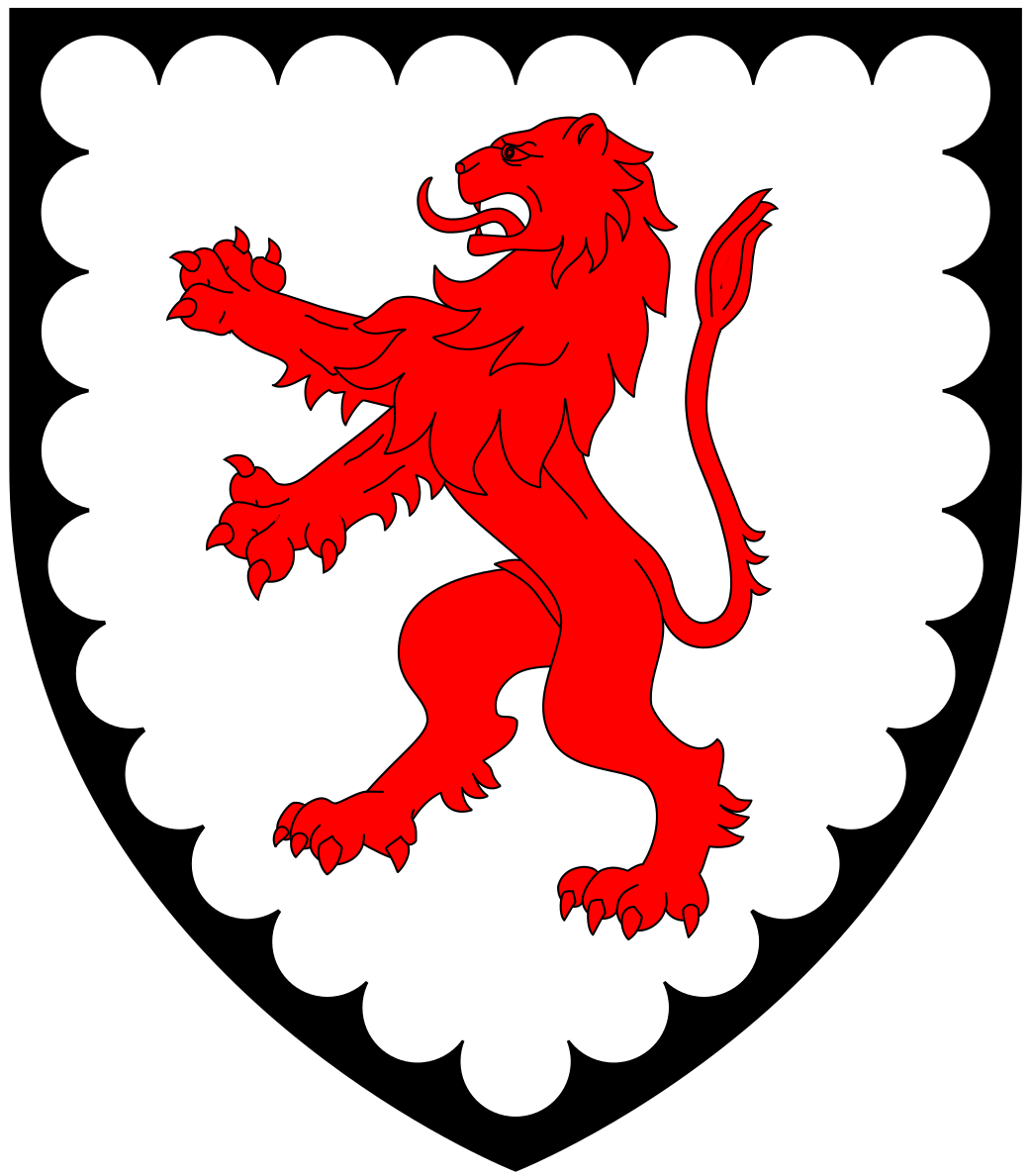
Arms of Champneys: Argent, a lion rampant gules a bordure engrailed sable

Arthur Champneys (c. 1658 – 1724) of Raleigh House in the parish of Pilton, Devon, and of Love Lane in the City of London, England, was a wealthy merchant and a Member of Parliament for Barnstaple (near Pilton), in Devon, from 1690 to 1705.

== Origins ==
Sign at entrance to today's "Cogworthy Farm", anciently the mansion house of "Cockworthy", seat of the de Cockworthy family, lords of the manor of Yarnscombe and later of the Champneys family He was a younger son of John Champneys (1605-1681) of Cockworthy (today "Cogworthy" Farm) in the parish of Yarnscombe, Devon, educated at Oxford University, whose mural monument formerly existed in Yarnscombe Church, by his second wife Anne Upton, 3rd daughter of John Upton (1590-1641) of Lupton in the parish of Brixham, Devon, an MP for Dartmouth in Devon. Anne's mother was Dorothy Rous (or Rowse) (d. 1644), a daughter of Sir Anthony Rous (c. 1555-1620), MP, of Halton Barton (one of Cornwall's richest residents) and sister of Francis Rous (1579-1659), MP and theologian.

== Career ==
Champneys' election as one of the two MPs for Barnstaple was due to his having in 1689 purchased the important manor of Raleigh in the parish of Pilton, adjoining the town of Barnstaple, from Sir Arthur Chichester, 3rd Baronet, whom he succeeded as MP for Barnstaple in 1690. The manor of Raleigh controlled the electorate of at least one seat within the Rotten Borough, and until 1566 the Chichester family had been lords of the manor of "Barnstaple Castle Manor" or "Castle Court". In 1703 Champneys sold Raleigh to Sir Nicholas Hooper (1654–1731), his fellow MP for Barnstaple in 1701.

== Marriage and children ==
He married Hannah Ingram (1673-1693), a daughter of Sir Arthur Ingram (1617-1681), of the parish of St. Andrew's, Holborn, City of London, and of Bucknall, Lincolnshire, knight, a merchant, a Citizen of the City of London and a member of the Spanish Company, which was very active in Barnstaple. One of her sisters Anne Ingram married Nathaniel Herne (1668-1722), MP for Dartmouth 1699-1713 and nephew of Sir Joseph Herne, Governor of the East India Company 1690–2. Another of her sisters Philadelphia Ingram married a son of Sir Robert Barnham, 1st Baronet (MP Maidstone, 1660, 1661–79). Hannah died aged 20, leaving one daughter.

== Death and burial ==
He died in 1724 in London and was buried on 2 April 1724 at the Church of St Dionis Backchurch (demolished 1878) in the City of London. The large mural monument to his father-in-law in the chancel of that church made reference to him as follows:

Near this place lies the body of Sir Arthur Ingram, knt. Spanish Merchant, and Citizen of London, descended from a family in Lincolnshire. He died Sept. 12, an. Dom. 1681, aet suae 64, leaving behind him a mournful widow, Dame Anne Ingram, daughter of William Lowfield, citizen of London, and four young children; viz. Robert, Arthur, Hannah, and Anne. Also the body of the above-said Hannah, who married Arthur Champneys, of Raliegh, (sic) in Devon, Esq. and leaving one daughter, died May 1, A. D. 1693, aetat. suae 20. Also the body of the above-said Dame Anne Ingram; who, continuing a widow, and performing all other acts of love and tenderness to her children, died truly and heartily lamented by them, March 29, A. D. 1702, aet. suae 59; to whose memory her two sons, Robert and Arthur, have erected this monument. Also, the body of the above-said Robert Ingram, esq. who died June 11, 1745, aetat. 76. Also the body of the above said Arthur Ingram, esq. who died May 29, 1749, aet. 77. Durum sed levius fit patientia quicquid corrigere est nefas. Thy will be done !

== Sources ==
- Cruickshanks, Eveline, biography of "Champneys, Arthur (c.1658-1724), of Raleigh House, nr. Barnstaple, Devon and Love Lane, London", published in History of Parliament: the House of Commons 1690-1715, ed. D. Hayton, E. Cruickshanks, S. Handley, 2002 CHAMPNEYS, Arthur (c.1658-1724), of Raleigh House, nr. Barnstaple, Devon and Love Lane, London | History of Parliament Online
