= Nicholas Hooper (1654–1731) =

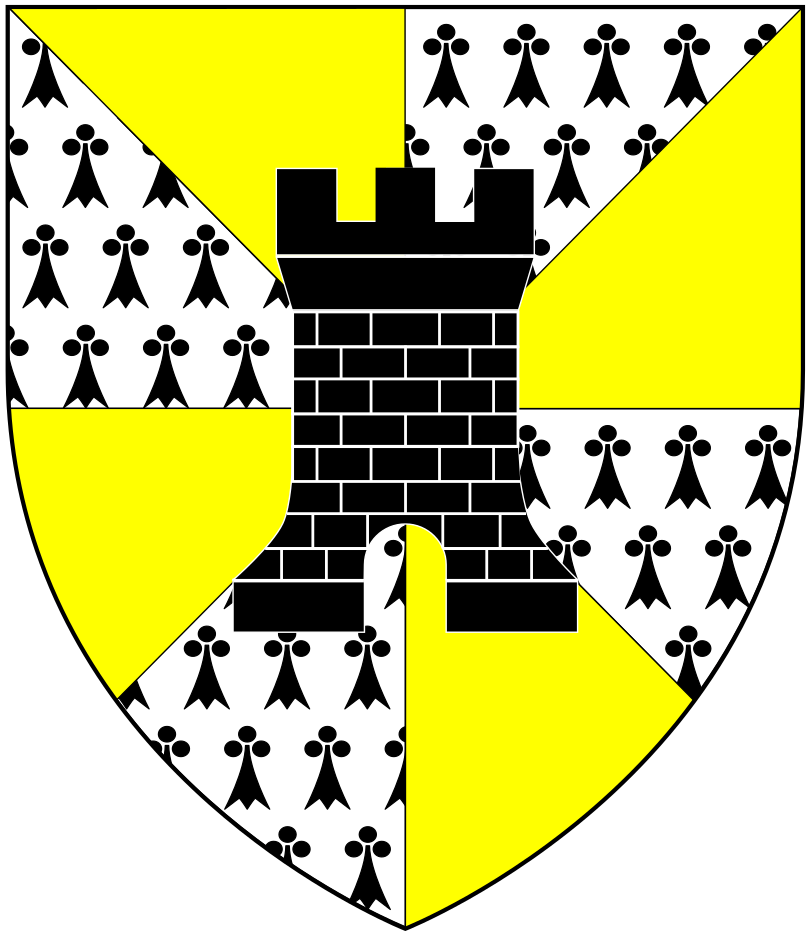
Arms of Hooper of Fullabrook: Gyronny of eight or and ermine, over all a castle triple-towered sable

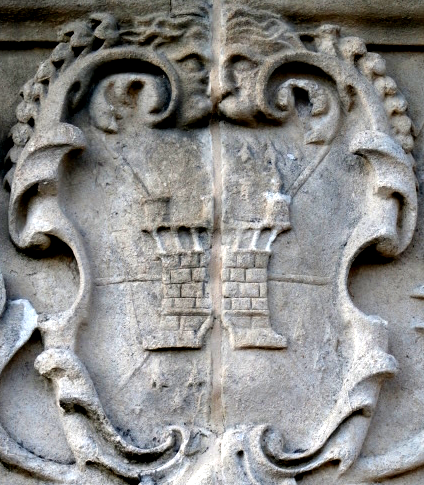
Arms of Sir Nicholas II Hooper (1654–1731): Gyronny of eight or and ermine, over all a castle triple-towered sable. Detail from parapet of The Mercantile Exchange (Queen Anne's Walk) (1713) Barnstaple

Sir Nicholas II Hooper (1654–1731) of Fullabrook, Braunton and Raleigh, Pilton in Devon, was a lawyer who served as Tory Member of Parliament for Barnstaple 1695–1715.

== Origins ==
He was the son of Nicholas I Hooper of Fullabrook, Braunton, Devon, 5 1/2 miles north-west of Barnstaple, by his wife Melior Pyne (1630–1703) (whose mural monument survives in the Church of Our Lady, Upton Pyne, near Crediton), 4th daughter of Edward Pyne (1595–1663) of East Down, Devon. A certain Richard Hooper was Mayor of Barnstaple in 1660 and 1674.

== Education ==
He was educated at Barnstaple Grammar School and in 1671 entered Gonville and Caius College, Cambridge.

== Career ==
He entered the Inner Temple in 1671 and was called to the bar in 1678 and appointed Bencher in 1700 and later Serjeant-at-Law. He was appointed Queen’s Serjeant 1702–14 and King’s Serjeant 1714, which office he held until his death. He was knighted 7 June 1713. In 1687 he was appointed to the locally honourable position of Deputy-Recorder, and by 1710/13 Recorder of Barnstaple.

== Marriage and children ==
In 1686 he married Elizabeth Stokes (d. 1731), daughter of Thomas Stokes of Otterton, Devon, by whom he had 2 sons, who both died childless, and 1 daughter:

- Nicholas III Hooper, who rebuilt Raleigh House on an adjacent site slightly higher up the hill, which building survives today. He died childless.
- Elizabeth Hooper (d.1726), heir to her brother Nicholas III Hooper, who in 1713 married John Bassett (1683–1721), of Heanton Punchardon and Umberleigh, Devon, MP for Barnstaple 1718–1721. She survived her husband and remarried to Rev. Thomas Morrison, and was buried at Bath Abbey. Her descendant Rev. Hooper Morrison in 1769 purchased the estate of Yeo Vale, Alwington, Devon, and married Charlotte Orchard (d.1791), whose monument survives in the Yeo Vale Aisle of Alwington Church, sister and in her issue heiress of Paul II Orchard (1739–1812) of Hartland Abbey. In 1810 Rev. Thomas Hooper Morrison (1767–1824) was the owner of Yeo Vale, Alwington and of Hartland Abbey.

== Landholdings ==
- Raleigh House, Pilton (now the site of the North Devon District Hospital, Barnstaple), which he purchased from his fellow MP Arthur Champneys in 1703. It has a commanding view over the town of Barnstaple. It was inherited by his son-in-law John Basset, MP, who was the owner as recorded in Dean Milles' Questionnaire of about 1745.
- Tithes of Pilton. He was the impropriator of the great and small tithes of Pilton, held in fee, excluding a small part held by the Rectory of Barnstaple. As such, due to the historical duties of the former Priory of Pilton, he was responsible for repairing the chancel of Pilton Church.
- Fullabrook in the parish of Braunton, Devon
- 62 Boutport Street, later The Golden Lion Inn, Barnstaple, outside the South Gate, the former town house of the Bourchier Earls of Bath of nearby Tawstock Court, which he purchased. It contains an important decorated barrel-vaulted plaster ceiling, and displays the arms of the Spanish Company.
- Burridge's, a tenement in Shirwell.

== Donations ==
On the tower of the parish church of St. Calixtus, West Down, (near Fullabrook), is a tablet which records its demolition in 1711 and its rebuilding in 1712, toward the cost of which "Sir Nicholas Hooper knt. of Fullabrook" donated £21. He also presented the clock and its bells.

== Death and burial ==
He died on 13 May 1731, a few months after his wife, and was buried at Barnstaple, with "his magnificent funeral attracting some caustic comment".

== Monuments ==
His arms Gyronny of eight or and ermine, over all a castle triple-towered sable are one of about 12 sculpted in stone on the parapet of Queen Anne's Walk in Barnstaple, which building(formerly known as the Mercantile exchange) was completed in 1713, representing several of the principal local dignitaries. These arms are also shown on a series of small enamelled brasses formerly displayed under the portico of the building but now on display on the staircase of Barnstaple Guildhall, his arms are shown in enamel, with tinctures, with the name "Hooper" inscribed on the frame.

These gyronny arms, with variant tinctures, were also borne by possibly related families including:

- Howper of Musbury, Devon (16th century);
- George Hooper (1640–1727), of Grimley, Worcestershire, Bishop of Bath and Wells. The arms Gyronny of eight or and ermine, over all a castle triple-towered sable appear on a funeral hatchment in Rodden Church, Somerset, relating to his daughter Abigail Hooper (1684–1763), whose husband was John Prowse of Axbridge. Her monument survives in Axbridge Church.
- Rev. James Hooper (d.1787), builder in about 1740 of Hendford House in Yeovil, Somerset;
- Hopper of Shincliffe, Durham;
- Hopper of Witton Castle, County Durham.

== Sources ==
- Cruickshanks, Eveline & Hanham, Andrew A., biography of Hopper, Nicholas (1654–1731), of the Inner Temple; Barnstaple and Braunton, Devon published in History of Parliament: House of Commons 1690–1715, ed. D. Hayton, E. Cruickshanks, S. Handley, London, 2002
- Venn, John, Biographical History of Gonville and Caius College 1349–1897, 2 volumes, Vol.1, Cambridge, 1897, p.445
