= John William Taylor =

English philanthropist

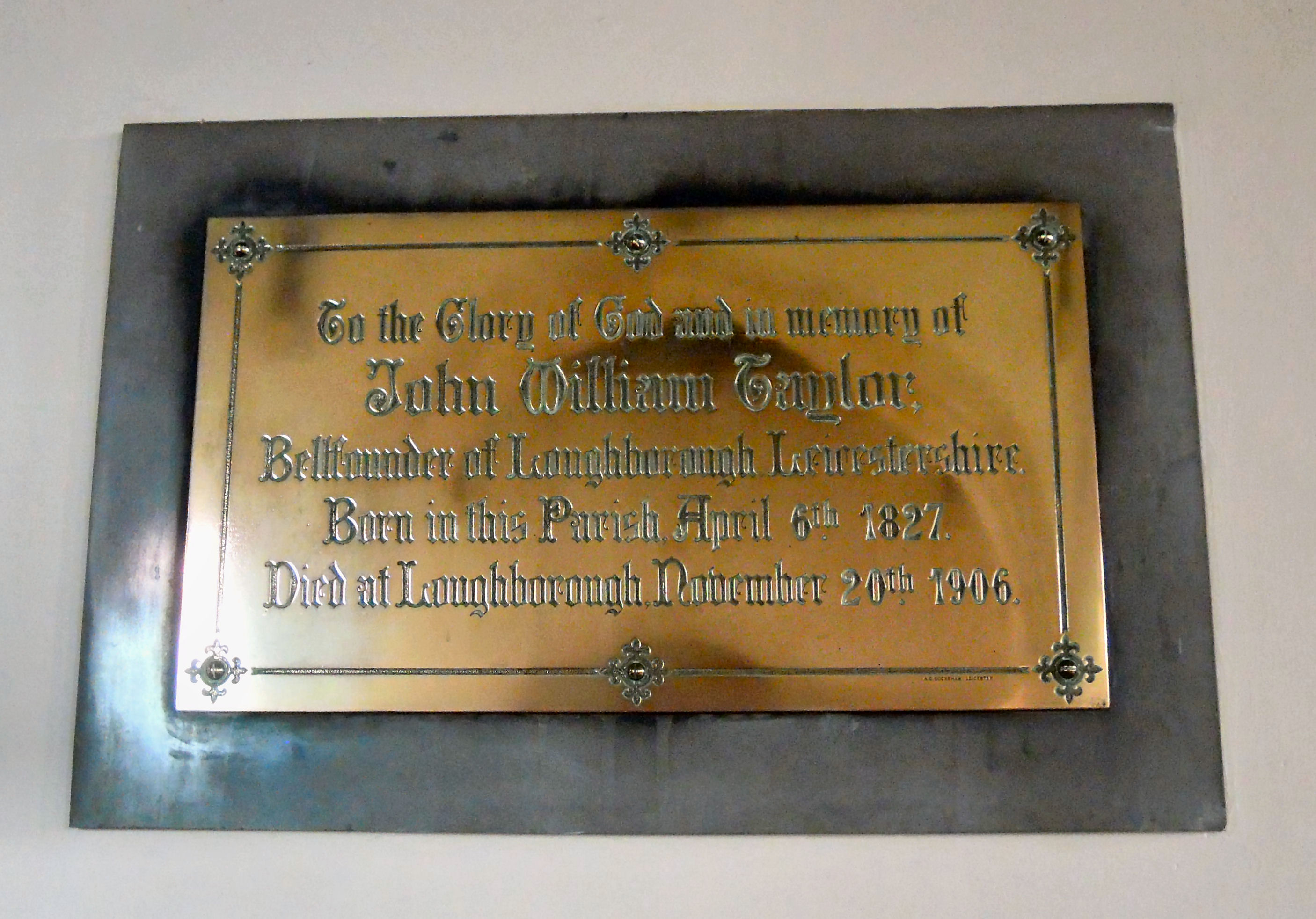
Memorial to John William Taylor in St Mary and St Benedict's church in Buckland Brewer, Devon

John William Taylor (6 April 1827–20 November 1906) was a philanthropist and bellfounder and a member of the John Taylor & Co dynasty of bellfounders based in Loughborough in Leicester.

== Biography ==
He was born in Buckland Brewer near Bideford in Devon in 1827, the eldest son of Amelia née Jones (1799–1880) and John Taylor (1797–1858), a bellfounder who, soon after his marriage in 1825 went to Buckland Brewer where he set up his bellfoundry. From here he took orders for all over the country and cast the peal of six bells for St Nectan's Church in nearby Hartland, Devon. John William Taylor was baptised in the parish church of St Mary and St Benedict in Buckland Brewer on 24 September 1827. The family lived in Buckland Brewer until at least 1837, when his sister Amelia Jones Taylor was born in Oxford where the family had a bellfoundry. By 1839 the family had removed to Loughborough where John Taylor set up another foundry.

John William Taylor became a bellringer, for a board dated 1847 in the belfry of Loughborough parish church records that in that year there was rung a peal of Grandsire Triples during which John W. Taylor rang the third bell. In 1852 aged 25 he married Eliza Brayley (1827–1910) of Loughborough. They had seven children: John William Taylor (1853–1919); Mary Elizabeth Taylor (1855–1937); Pryce Thomas Taylor (1860–1940); Charles Stuart Taylor (1862–1920); Edmund Denison Taylor (1864–1947); Horace Newcombe Taylor (1868–1924), and Owen Jemson Taylor (1870–1950);

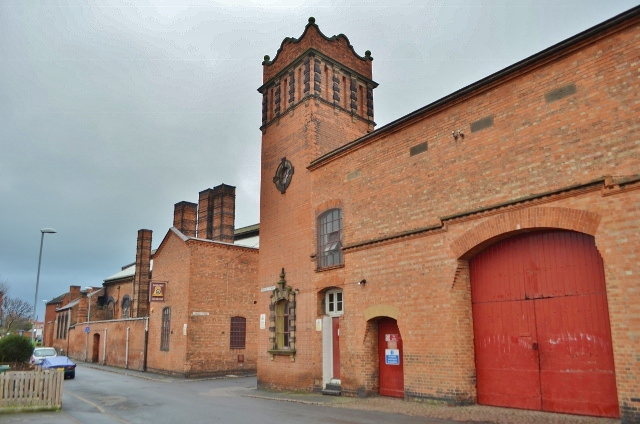
Taylor's bell foundry in Freehold Street, Loughborough, in late 2011

In 1856 he disagreed with the eminent horologist E. B. Denison over the matter of bellhanging, describing the eminent Denison's views as "most bad in principle."

On the death of his father John Taylor in 1858 he and his younger brother Pryce Jemson Jones Taylor (1835–1862) carried on the business, inscribing their bells 'John Taylor and Co., Loughborough', a tradition that continues to this day. In the same year he purchased land on Freehold Street and Chapman Street on which to build a new foundry. On the death of his brother Pryce aged just 27 in 1862 he assumed sole control of the company; at this time he began to consider a problem that was to occupy his thought for the next 30 years - namely, why it was that bells sounded out of tune. He wrote to the Hon. E. B. Denison, "I have almost a dread of attempting to harmonize bells up to A ... but I flatter myself at being able to reach G satisfactorily." He fell out with Denison over the specifications for the great peal of bells that was being planned for Worcester Cathedral, but Denison eventually won the argument and the bells were cast to his specification. The result confirmed Taylor's unease over the casting, and it was left to his son John William Taylor II to remodel and recast them many years later. However, Denison and Taylor overcame their differences, with Taylor naming his son Edmund Denison Taylor.

In 1881 under his management John Taylor & Co cast Great Paul, which hangs in the south-west tower of St Paul's Cathedral and which, at 16 1/2 long tons (16,800 kg) was the largest bell in the British Isles until the casting of the Olympic Bell for the 2012 London Olympics. For many years Taylor continued with attempting to realise a "true-harmonic" in bell casting until in 1896 the company perfected its five tone principle of bell tuning resulting in the first peal of tuned bells to be hung in Norton church tower near Sheffield. At around this time Taylor made a great advance in the process of moulding bells when he obtained "...a complete set of iron shells for bells up to four tons". With these "bellcases" he was able to mould bells in his foundry and have them cast at "a foundry with which I am connected".

John William Taylor died in Loughborough in 1906 aged 79. In his will he left an estate valued at £47,614 16s 2d. A commemorative plaque in his memory is located on the foundry's tower wall.
