= Deanery of Hartland =

Administrative unit of the Church of England

The Deanery of Hartland is part of the Archdeaconry of Barnstaple, one of the four archdeaconries in the Diocese of Exeter.

== Parishes of the Hartland Deanery ==
The parishes of the Hartland Deanery are:

- Abbotsham
- Alwington
- Appledore St Mary's Church, Appledore
- Bideford Church of St Mary, Bideford
- Buckland Brewer St Mary and St Benedict
- Bucks Mills
- Clovelly
- Hartland St Nectan's Church, Hartland
- Landcross, Devon
- Littleham
- Lundy
- Monkleigh
- Northam Church of St Margaret of Antioch, Northam
- Parkham
- Weare Giffard
- Welcombe St Nectan's Church, Welcombe
- Woolfardisworthy, Torridge
