= St Nectan's Church, Hartland =

Church in Devon, England

- Parish Church of St Nectan
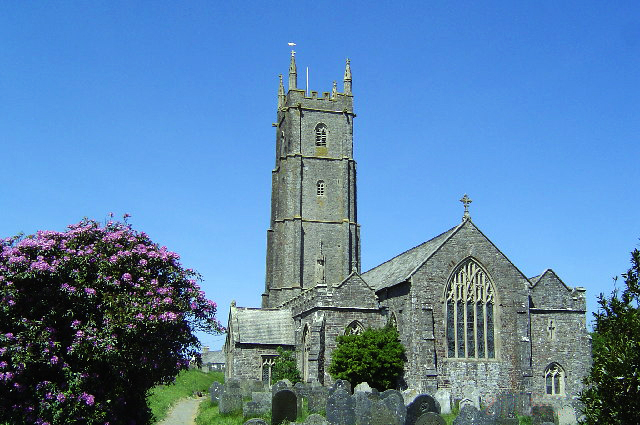
- Church of St Nectan
- St Nectan's Church, Hartland
- 50°59′42″N 4°30′59″W
- Country: United Kingdom
- Denomination: Church of England
- Churchmanship: Broad Church
- Website: www.achurchnearyou.com/hartland-st-nectan/

History
- Status: Parish Church
- Founder: Gytha, Countess of Wessex
- Dedication: Saint Nectan

Architecture
- Style: Gothic

Specifications
- Capacity: 600
- Length: 137 ft
- Materials: stone and rubble

Administration
- Province: Canterbury
- Diocese: Exeter
- Archdeaconry: Barnstaple
- Deanery: Hartland
- Parish: Hartland (Hartland Coast Team)

Clergy
- Rector: The Revd Jane Skinner; Team Rector

The Church of St Nectan is the parish church of Hartland, Devon, England. Sometimes referred to as the "Cathedral of North Devon", it is located in the hamlet of Stoke, about 1.5 miles (2.4 km) west of the town of Hartland. It is dedicated to Saint Nectan.

== History ==
Saint Nectan was one of many Celtic hermits and missionaries associated with early Christian sites in south-west Britain, South Wales and Ireland in the fifth and sixth centuries. A well 100 metres from the church is the reputed site of his hermitage.

The history of the area is obscure; however, the first recorded building here was a collegiate church served by twelve secular canons founded c. 1050 by Gytha, Countess of Wessex (mother of King Harold). Traditionally the church was founded in thanksgiving for the preservation of her husband's life in a storm at sea; a better tradition associates her husband Godwin, Earl of Wessex and holder of the royal manor of Harton, with the foundation.

Nothing is known of the earliest building nor whether it was rebuilt or enlarged when the collegiate church was replaced by a house of Augustinian regulars at Hartland Abbey in the twelfth century.

The current building, believed to date from 1360, replaced the earlier church on the site, of which only the font still remains and is thought to date from 1170. The 128 ft tower, rising in four stages, claimed to be the highest in Devon, has for centuries been a landmark to sailors at sea. It was built about sixty years after the rest of the church and it contains a peal of six bells cast in nearby Buckland Brewer by John Taylor & Co and last rehung in 1952, weighing practically 3 tons. The arch of the tower, open today, once housed a musicians' gallery where the 'church orchestra' of fiddles, double bass, flute and clarinet played for services.

=== Notable features ===
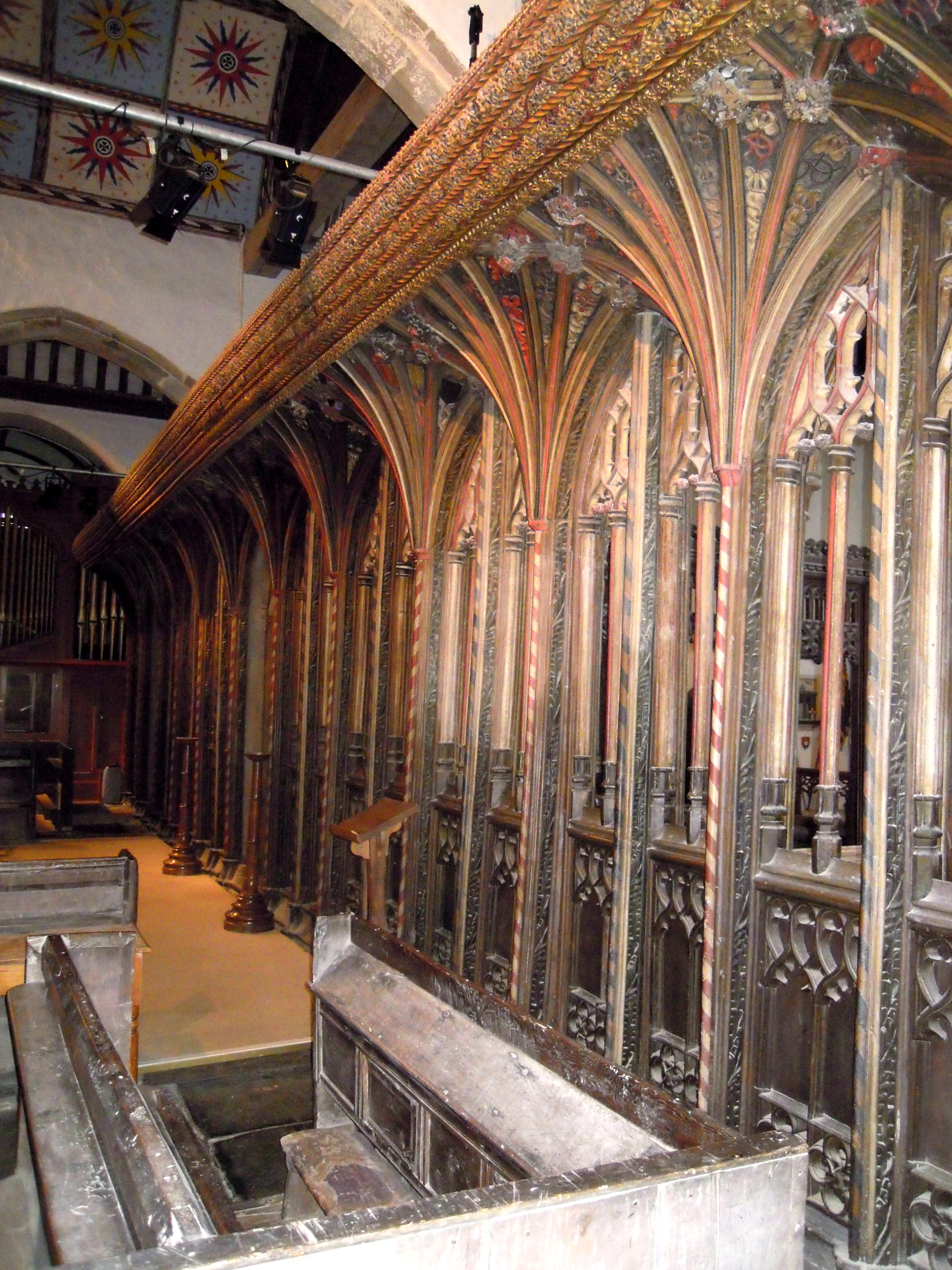
The 15th-century rood screen

The magnificent rood screen (the finest in North Devon), dating from 1450, is a massive structure of eleven bays, 45 ft 6 in long, 12 ft 6 in high and 5 ft 10 in wide at the top. Earlier times saw both the organ and seating on top of the screen. Other features of interest include the fine Norman font and the old wagon roofs. The monuments include an elaborate medieval tomb-chest, a small brass of 1610 and a metal-inlaid lid of a churchyard tomb of 1618.

The church contains a set of five windows by the glass painters Caroline Townshend and Joan Howson which depict the history of the parish. A further window by Townshend & Howson is installed at St John's chapel of ease in Hartland Square. The main east window and the tower window are by Christopher Webb. There are at least two windows by Alfred Beer, the south window in the sanctuary and the east window in the chancel chapel; it is possible that the removed but retained glass from the south chancel chapel window is also his.

The whole building is fitted out with a fine if plain set of pews, mostly dating from the 16th-century.

The graveyard of St. Nectan's is the burial place of Mary Norton (1903–1992), a children's writer, whose most famous work is The Borrowers.

== List of clergy ==
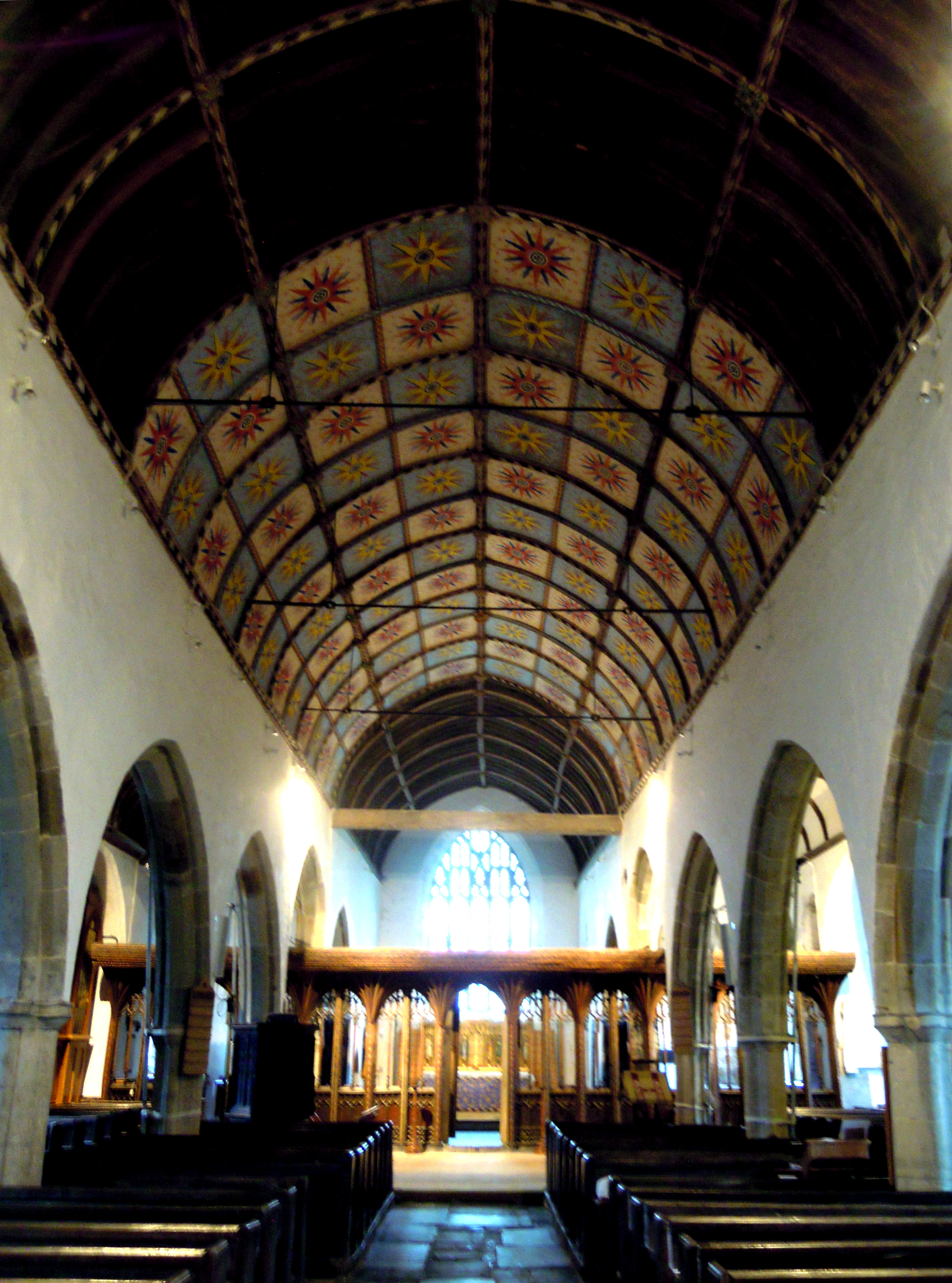
View down the nave showing the wagon-roof

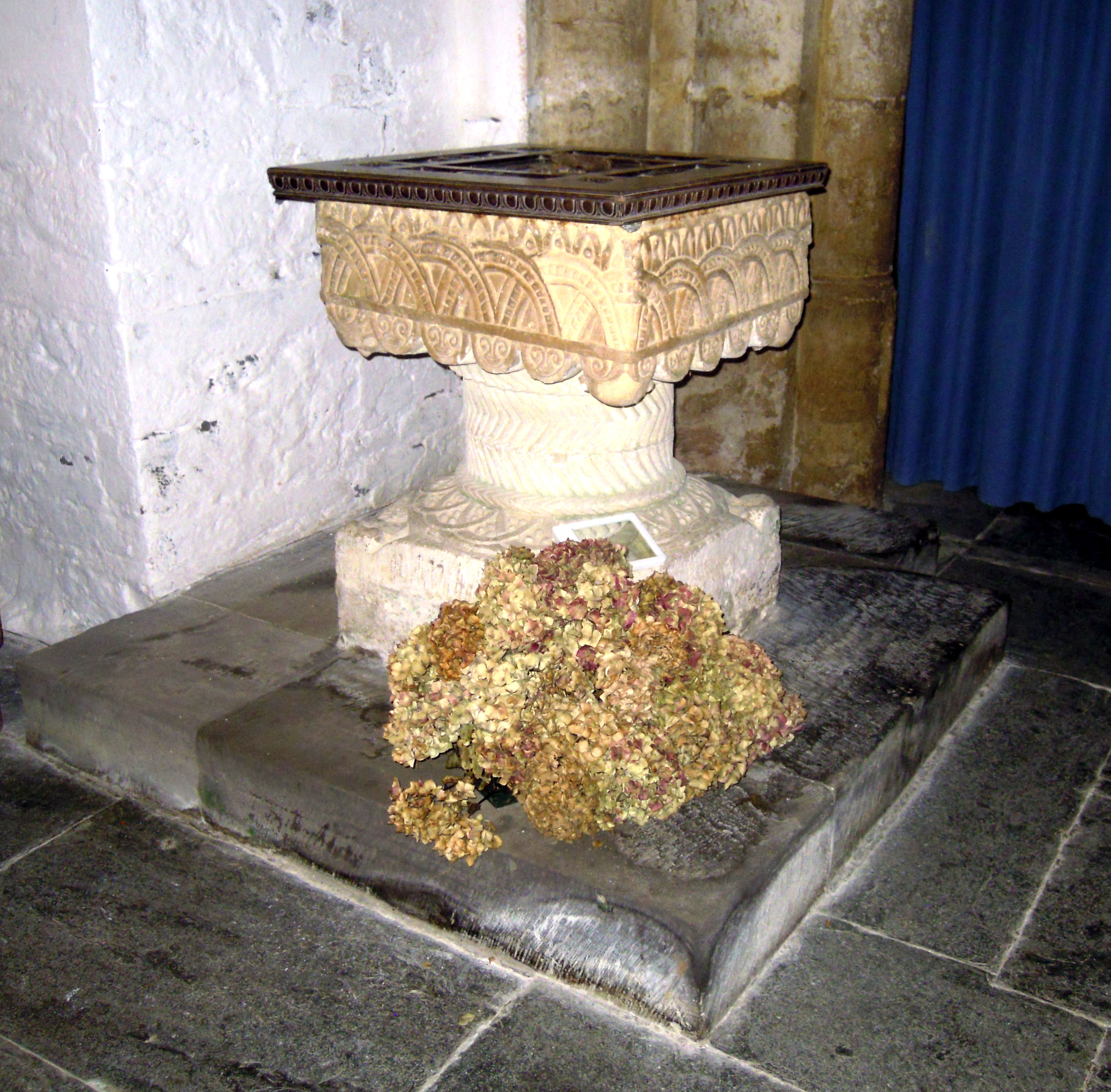
The Norman font

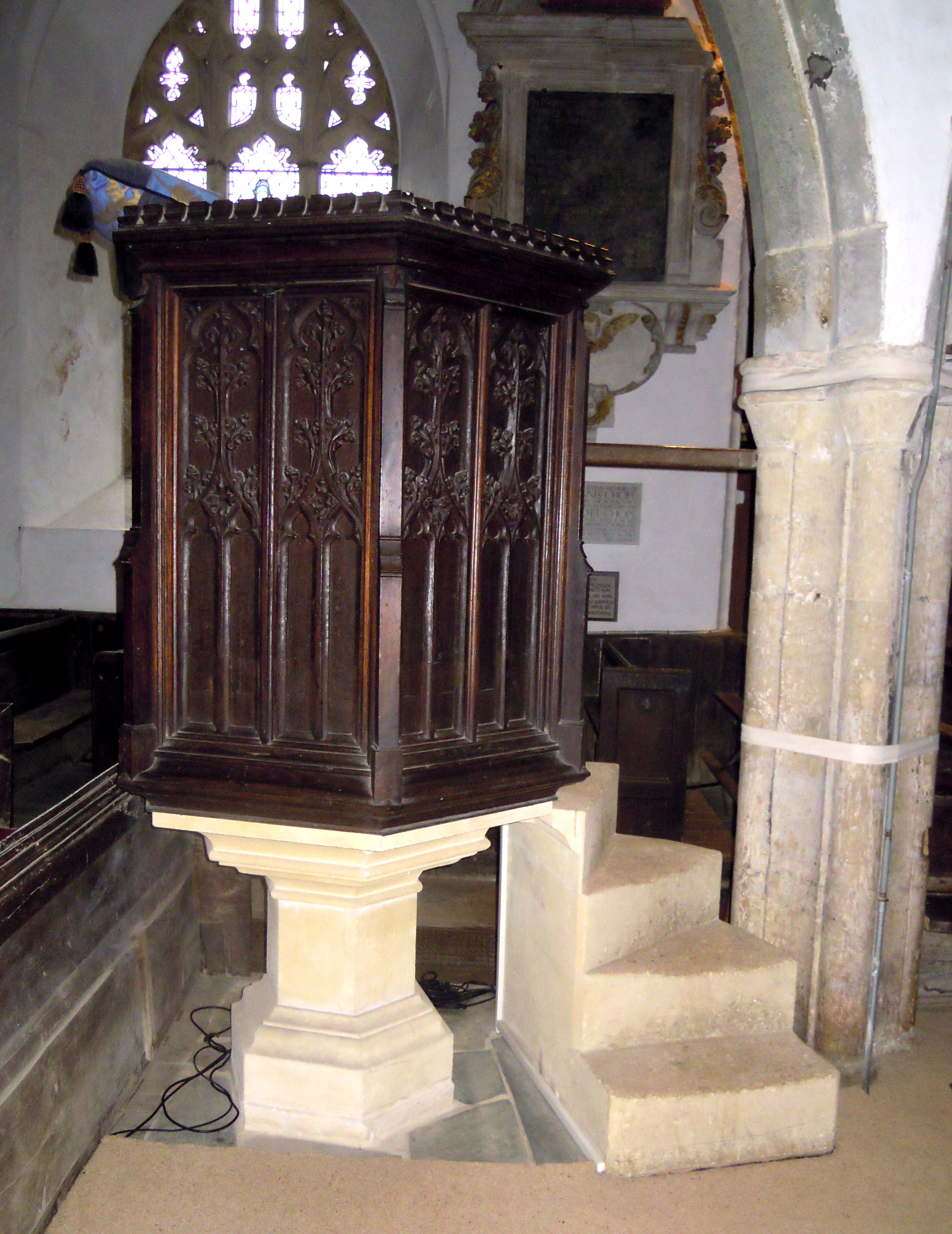
The pulpit

Period	Perpetual Curate
1543-1547	The Reverend John Husband
1598-1627	The Reverend Thomas Dove
1627-1646	The Reverend William Churton MA
1646-1676	The Reverend George Mountjoy BA
1677-1705	The Reverend William Orchard
1708-1726	The Reverend Robert Forster
1726-1739	The Reverend Canon James Harcourt DD
1739-1752	The Reverend Kenrick Prescot DD
1752-1755	The Reverend William Morris
1755-1796	The Reverend Francis Tutte MA
1796-1859	The Reverend William Chanter BA
1859-1865	The Reverend Thomas How Chope BA
Period	Vicar of Hartland
1865-1906	The Reverend Thomas How Chope BA
1907-1917	The Reverend Edgar Albert Luff MA
1917-1953	The Reverend Prebendary Ivon Lancelot Gregory BD
1953-1966	The Reverend Andrew T. H. Jones MA
1966-1977	The Reverend F. Harold Lockyear
1978-1980	The Reverend Louis M. Coulson Priest in Charge
1980-1993	The Reverend Louis M. Coulson
Period	Hartland Coast Team Ministry (Minister with special responsibility for Hartland)
1994-2001	The Reverend David J. Ford BD, Team Vicar
2003-2006	The Reverend Colin Hodgetts BA, Associate Minister
2006-2007	The Reverend Colin Hodgetts BA, Hon. Ass. Minister
2007-2012	The Reverend Shirley Henderson BA, Team Vicar
2012-2015	The Reverend Shirley Henderson BA, Team Rector
2016-2018	The Reverend Brenda Jacobs BA, Team Rector

2018 - The Reverend Jane Skinner Team Rector

== Services ==
Sunday:

- 1st: 11:00 Morning Worship
- 2nd: 11:00 Sung Eucharist
- 3rd: 10:00 Breakfast Church - all-age worship at the Church Rooms The Square Hartland
- 4th: 11:00 Sung Eucharist
- 5th: 11:00 Team Service at varying locations

Weekdays (in the Church Rooms):

- 08:30 Morning Prayer (except Wednesday)
- 11:00 Holy Communion (Wednesday)

== See also ==
- North Devon Coast AONB
