= Orleigh Court =

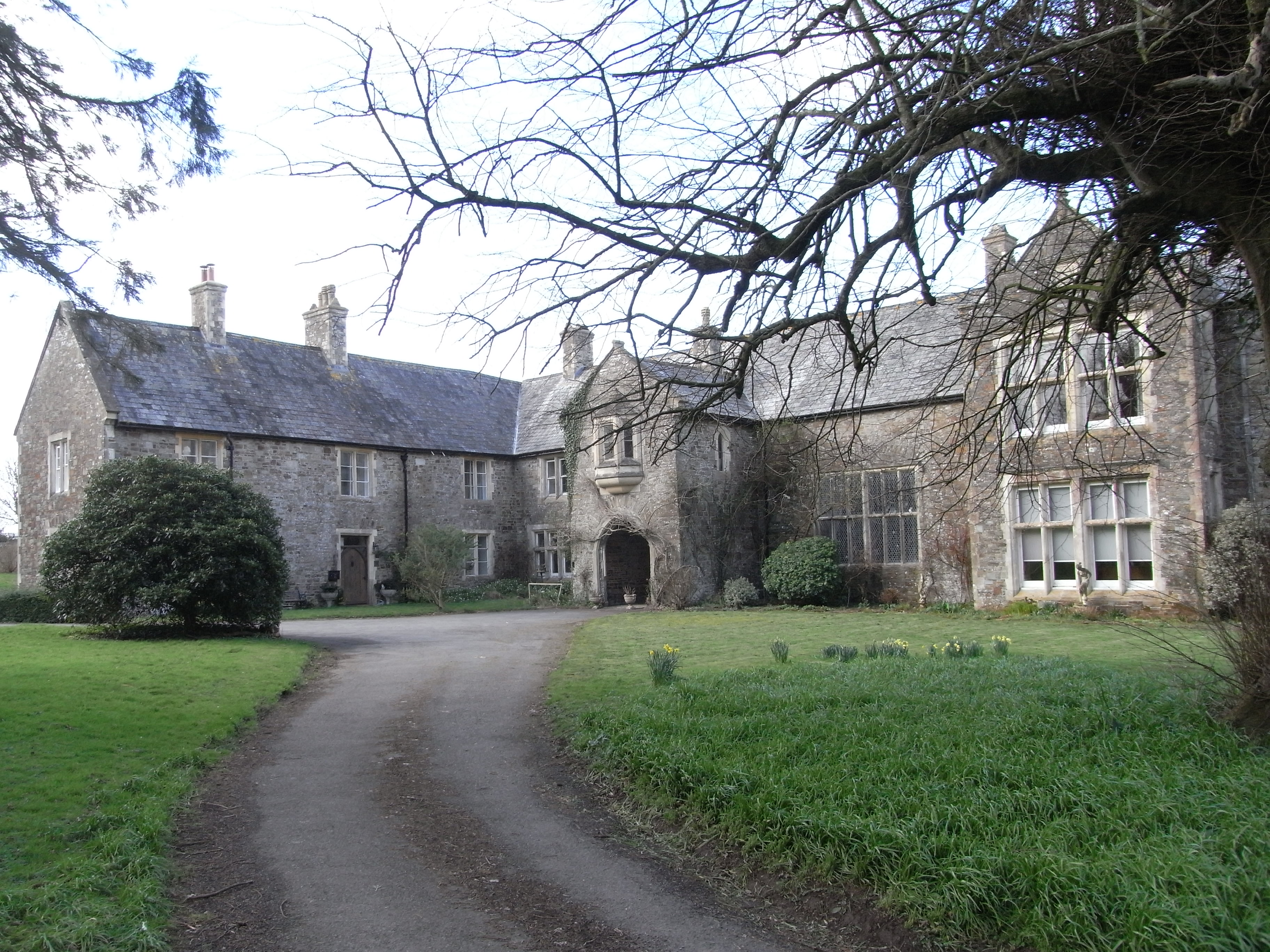
- The front of Orleigh Court

- Location within Devon
- 50.9783°N 4.2382°W
- Location: Buckland Brewer, Devon, England

History
- Built: Early/mid 14th century, but much remodelled

Site notes
- Architect(s): Various, latest major changes by J. H. Hakewill c.1870

Listed Building – Grade I
- Official name: Orleigh Court
- Designated: 22 January 1952
- Reference no.: 1170935

Orleigh Court is a late medieval manor house in the parish of Buckland Brewer about 4 miles (6.4 km) south-west of Bideford, North Devon, England. It is a two-storeyed building constructed from local slate stone and has a great hall with a hammer-beam roof, installed in the late 15th century.

The building was substantially altered in the early 18th century and remodelled after 1869. It was redeveloped for multiple occupancy in the 1980s and is now divided into about twelve apartments. It was the birthplace of the famous explorer and discoverer of the source of the River Nile, John Hanning Speke (1827–1864).

== History ==
=== Early ===
The earliest parts of the building to survive were built by a member of the Denys family. The hall, which is 30 ft x 20 ft and has 5-foot-thick walls, has been dated by the form of decoration around the doorways to the early to mid-14th century. In 1416, a licence for a chapel at the house was granted by Bishop Stafford, and it has been speculated that the room over the porch was used for this.

During the late 15th century the hall was remodelled and it is clear that some of the work was based on that already done at nearby Weare Giffard Hall; identical carving on the porches of both buildings shows that the same mason was employed for at least part of the work. The main improvement, though, was the construction of a fine four-bay hammerbeam roof to the main hall, again clearly influenced by, though somewhat less ornate than the one at Weare Giffard. The hammer-beams are supported on carved stone corbels representing figures, one of which holds a shield displaying the arms of the Denys family (three battleaxes). Sitting on the ends of the hammer-beams were a series of ten carved sitting heraldic beasts, each around two feet tall.

A few alterations were made during the late 16th century, such as the addition of a staircase to the left of the porch, and the insertion of a large window into the hall to the right of the porch. The last male member of the Denys family of Orleigh was Anthony Dennis (died 1641), to whom a mural monument survives in the Orleigh Chapel in St Mary and St Benedict's Church, Buckland Brewer. (Note: Mural monument to Anthony Dennis (d.1641), his second wife, and his eleven children in Buckland Brewer church.) When he died in 1641 he left three daughters as co-heiresses and they conveyed the property to trustees in 1661. In 1684 the trustees sold it to John I Davie (died 1710), a prominent tobacco merchant from Bideford.

=== Davie family ===
...the chief Mansion of Mr Davie, who having a predilection for Watermouth has intentions either of letting or disposing of this place.

— Rev. John Swete who passed by near Orleigh in 1797 and wrote of it in his journal.

John I Davie died in 1710 and is commemorated by a large mural monument in the Orleigh Chapel of St Mary's Church, Buckland Brewer. his son and heir, Joseph Davie (died 1723), embarked on a series of improvements to the interior. These included, in the hall, the installation of an ornamental fireplace, and the addition of fire buckets decorated with the Davie arms and the date 1721 — they remained in place until the early 20th century. Other additions made at this time included a new inner hall accessed from newly created doors by the side of the fireplace, and rainwater heads on the east front of the building, which bear the Davie arms as well as those of Pryce, which refer to Joseph Davie's wife, Juliana Pryce, who died aged 28 in 1720. Joseph himself died in 1723, but the building stayed in the Davie family until 1807, when it was in the ownership of Joseph Davie Bassett, who built Watermouth Castle and moved there. In that year Orleigh Court was either sold, or according to local tradition, lost in a game of cards, to Major Edward Lee.

=== Lee, Speke and Rogers ===
After Edward Lee's death in 1819, the house passed to his nephew, the politician John Lee Lee (1802–1874), who did not live there but let it to his sister and her husband, William Speke. Born at Orleigh in 1827 was their son John Hanning Speke, the celebrated explorer who discovered the source of the River Nile. From 1845 the house was occupied by other tenants: (Note: Col. Bayly from 1845 to 1856, and Capt. Audley Mervyn-Archdale from 1856 to 1869.) In 1869 Orleigh was sold to Thomas Rogers, who employed the architect J. H. Hakewill to make extensive changes to the house, including the replacement of most of the windows, including a new oriel window in the porch, complete reworking of the north range and the addition of a wood-panelled dining room. Hakewill also built two Mock Tudor lodges in the grounds. Orleigh was inherited by his son William Henry Rogers (born 1868), who made a few alterations to it, such as replacing some of the dry-rot infested panelling in the hall with 16th-century decorated panels which he had discovered in a loft over the stables, and which he surmised had been removed from the original dining room.

William Henry Rogers was an antiquarian and he included a history of Orleigh Court in a booklet about Buckland Brewer, published in 1938. However, by 1939 he had sold the house, which was then converted into multiple occupation until after World War II when it was left empty and decaying. In 1952 it was made a listed building, but remained empty until 1982, when work began to convert it into apartments. In 1986 the owner attempted to sell by auction at Sotheby's the ten 15th-century wooden animal carvings that had decorated the hammer-beams, but their provenance was investigated and they were deemed to be fixtures of a listed building, so they were returned and the owner was prosecuted. As a result of this incident the listing status of the building was increased to Grade I. As of 2011, the building is divided into a number of apartments and is surrounded by eight acres of communal grounds.

== Sources ==
- Cherry, Bridget & Pevsner, Nikolaus (1989). The Buildings of England – Devon. Harmondsworth: Penguin. ISBN 0-14-071050-7.
- Emery, Anthony (2006) Greater Medieval Houses of England and Wales, 1300–1500: Southern England
- Rogers, W. H. (1926). "Orleigh: An Ancient House". Report & Transactions of the Devonshire Association. 58.
- Rogers, W. H. (1938) Buckland Brewer, reprinted 2000, Snetzler, M.F. (Ed.), Barcott, Buckland Brewer
