= St Nectan's Church, Welcombe =

Coordinates: 50°56′17″N 4°31′24″W

Church of Saint Nectan
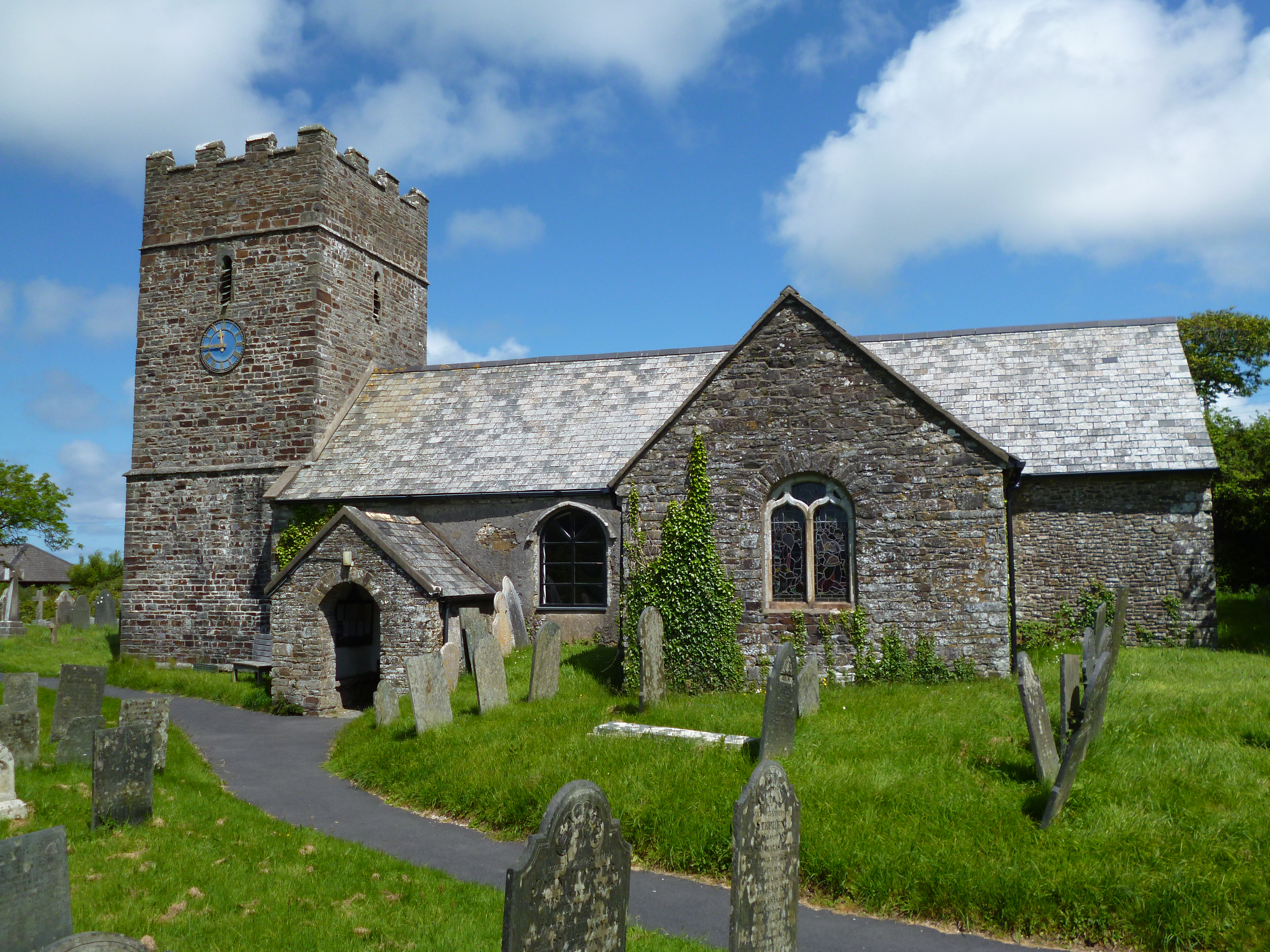
- Church of Saint Nectan
- Denomination: Church of England
- Churchmanship: Broad
- Website: www.welcombe.net www.achurchnearyou.com/welcombe-st-nectan/

History
- Dedication: Saint Nectan

Administration
- Province: Canterbury
- Diocese: Exeter
- Archdeaconry: Barnstaple
- Deanery: Hartland
- Parish: Welcombe (Hartland Coast Team Ministry)

Clergy
- Priest(s): Currently in Interrgnum; Priest-in-Charge

St Nectan's Church is the parish church of Welcombe, on the border of Devon and Cornwall.

W. G. Hoskins writes "St Nectan's Chapel was one of the many medieval chapels in the vast parish of Hartland. It lies in unspoiled country, altogether Cornish in appearance and feeling, with views down the combes to the Atlantic. Welcombe was raised to parochial status in 1508, when the church was enlarged by the addition of the north and south transepts. The square-headed screen (early 14th century) is of unique interest. It is, except for its cornice (which is later and much resembles that at Hartland) by far the earliest remaining screen in Devon. The lectern is Jacobean and the pulpit restored Tudor." The church was 'restored' in 1883-84 and a vestry added in 1911. The tower contains six bells, four cast in 1731.

According to Nikolaus Pevsner the building is early medieval, including the low western tower. The pulpit has narrow early Renaissance panels. There is a holy well near the church.
