= Church of St Mary and St Benedict, Buckland Brewer =

Church in Devon, England

Coordinates: 50°57′57″N 4°15′11″W

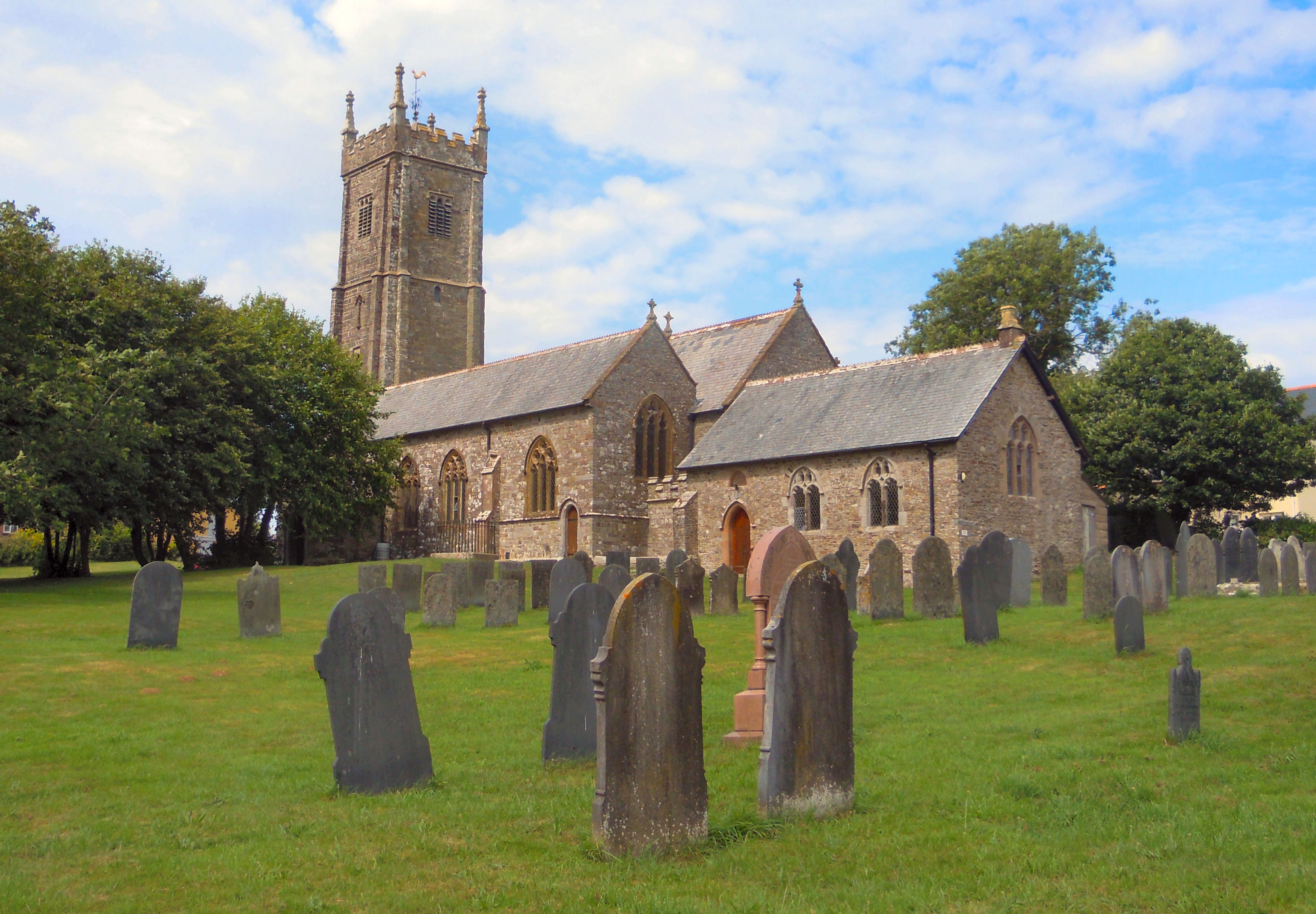
The church of St Mary and St Benedict in Buckland Brewer in North Devon

St Mary and St Benedict is the Church of England parish church for the village of Buckland Brewer near Bideford in North Devon. It is part of the benefice of the Hartland Coast Team Ministry. This falls within Hartland Deanery, in the Archdeaconry of Barnstaple in the Diocese of Exeter. Begun in the 14th century with 15th-century additions and retaining several architectural features from the first church of about 1100, the building was much restored in the 19th century and has been a Grade II* listed building on the Register of Historic England since 1958.

== History ==
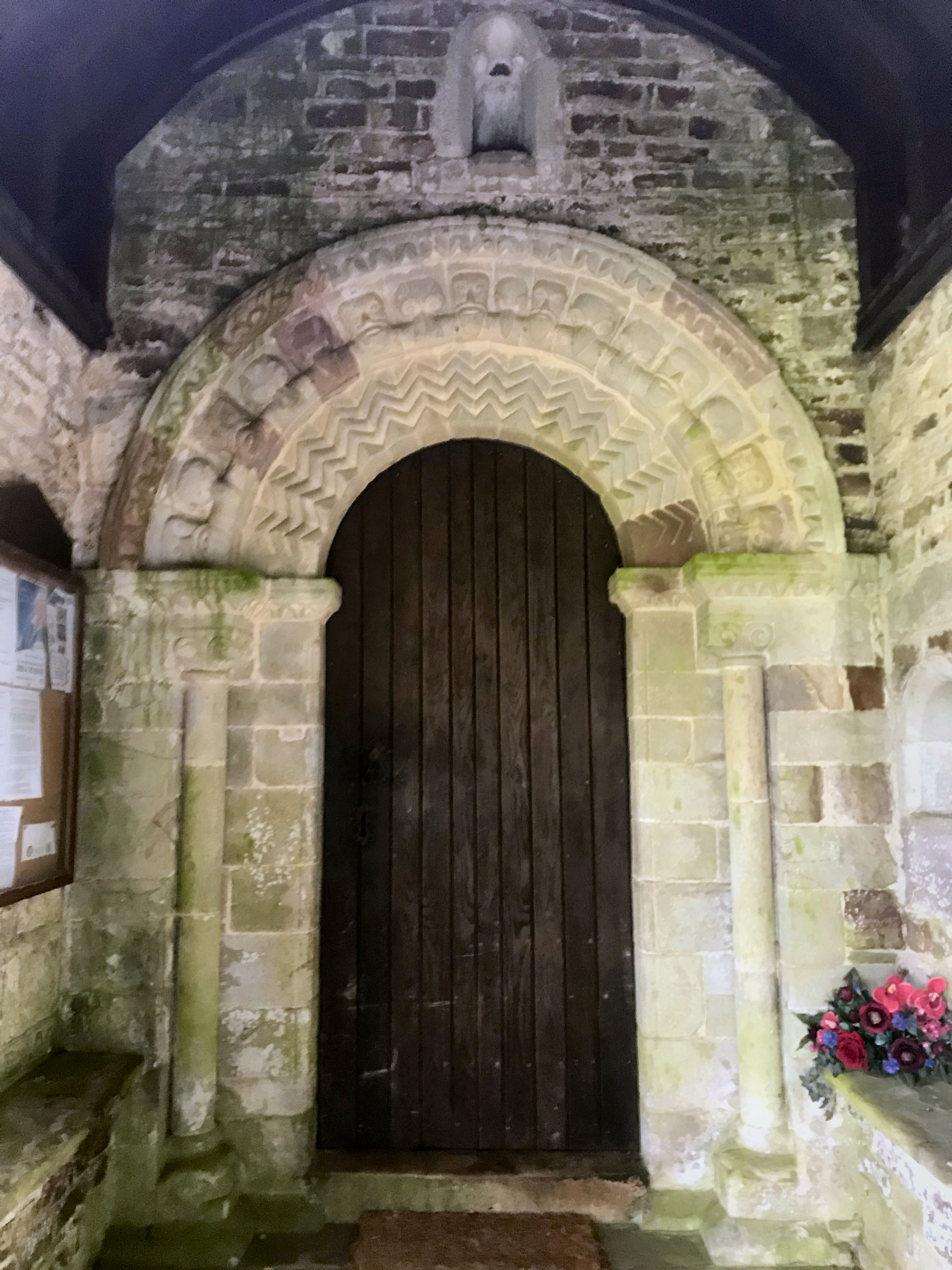
The carved Norman doorway dates to about 1100 while the image niche above the doorway dates to about 1200

The third church to stand on the site, the first was probably built in about 1100. The earliest recorded incumbent, Sir Walter de Denetone, was appointed in 1279. This first church was destroyed by fire in about 1390 apart from the carved and decorative Norman arched doorway which survived and which continues to serve as the main entrance to the church on the south side. Rebuilt in about 1399, the living originally belonged to Torre Abbey but was seized by Henry VIII in 1539 since when it has remained in the gift of the sovereign. The church was struck by lightning and almost destroyed by fire in 1769, (pillars near the Orleigh Chapel in the north-east corner still show fire damage). The church was hit by severe storms in 1877 leading to the restoration work of 1878 to 1880.

== Design ==
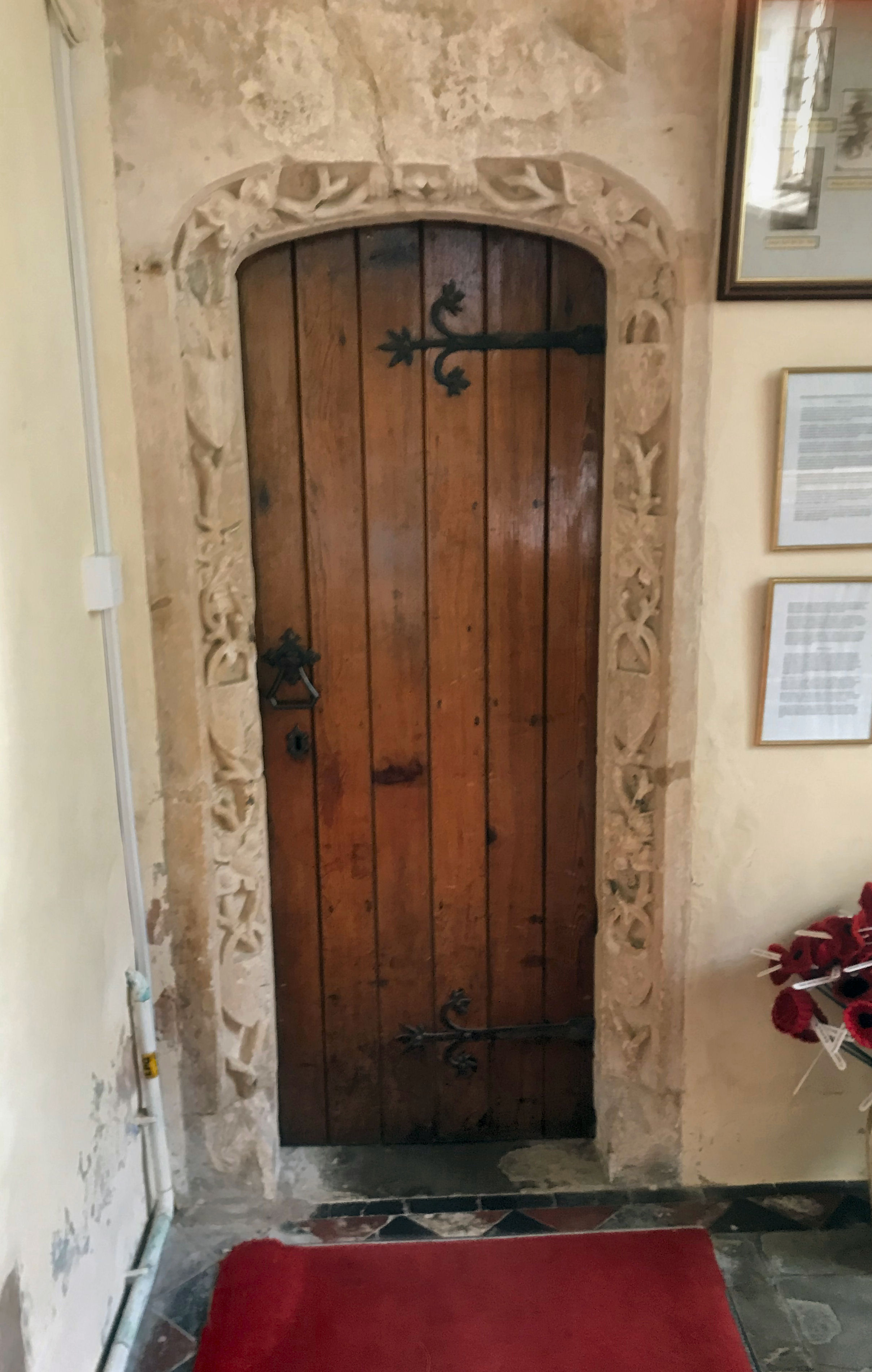
The 16th-century moulded stone priest's door was deliberately damaged during the English Civil War

The present church was begun in about 1399 and is built of squared and coursed slatestone with ashlar to the tower. The nave, south aisle and chancel were extensively restored by architect Samuel Hooper of Hatherleigh in 1878–80. Beside the chancel is the north chapel (the "Orleigh Chapel" - one of the oldest surviving parts of the church along with the tower) featuring several interesting wall monuments while the nave has a south aisle and porch. The east end of the south aisle is connected via a 16th-century moulded stone priest's door carved with decoration of leaves, branches and shields (partially deliberately damaged during the English Civil War) leading to a late 19th-century passageway with a crenellated wall. At the end of this passage is located the former 15th-century parish schoolroom (said by some to have been a chapel dedicated to St. Stephen) restored in 1880 and used today as a parish hall. This large room is fitted with a Perpendicular-style east window dating to the restoration of 1880 and a two-bay south front with a pointed-arched doorway of 1880 and two 15th-century two-light cinquefoiled windows. The rest of the church has windows dating to the Victorian restoration of 1878–80.

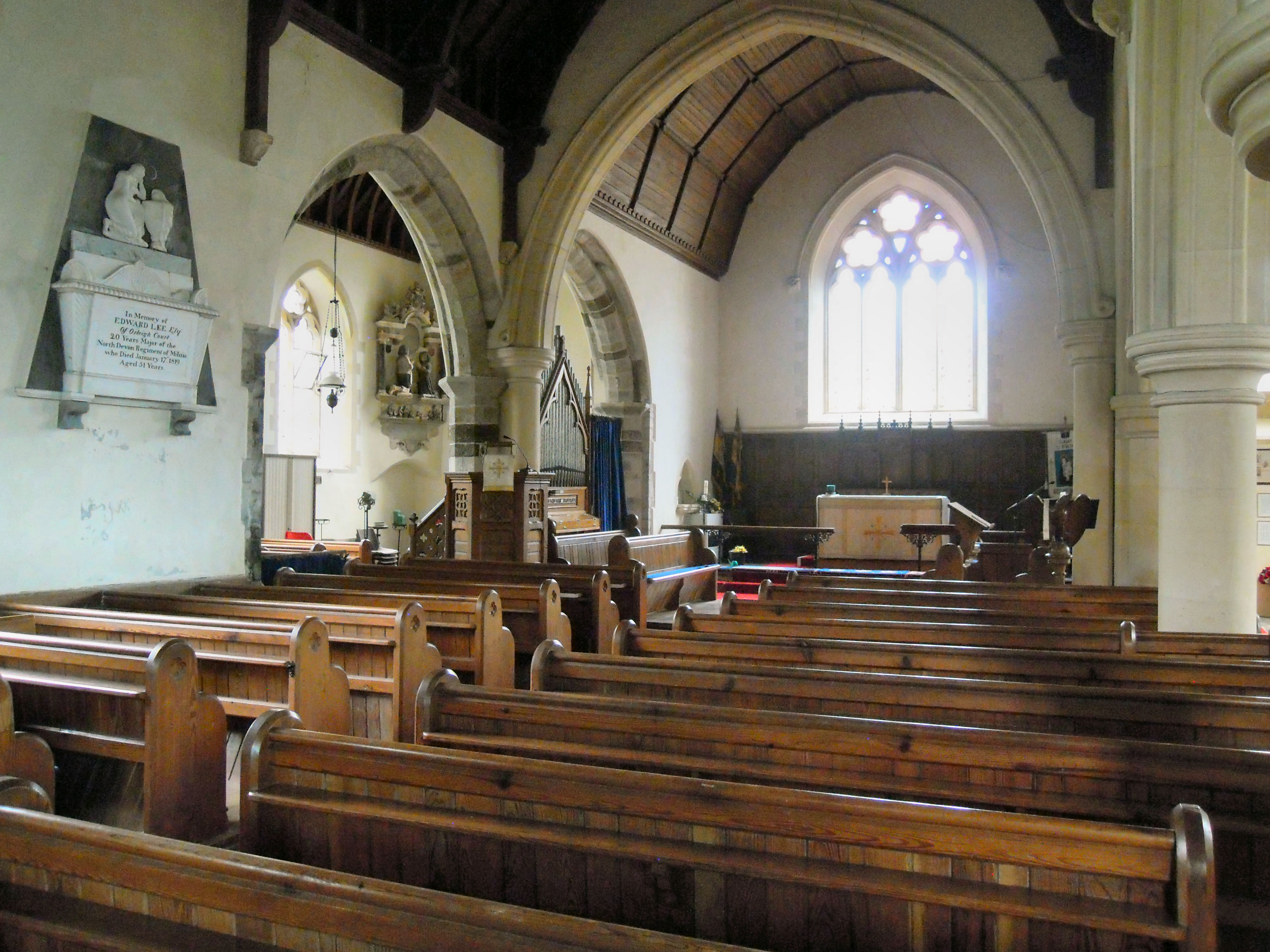
View from the nave towards the chancel with the Orleigh Chapel in the corner

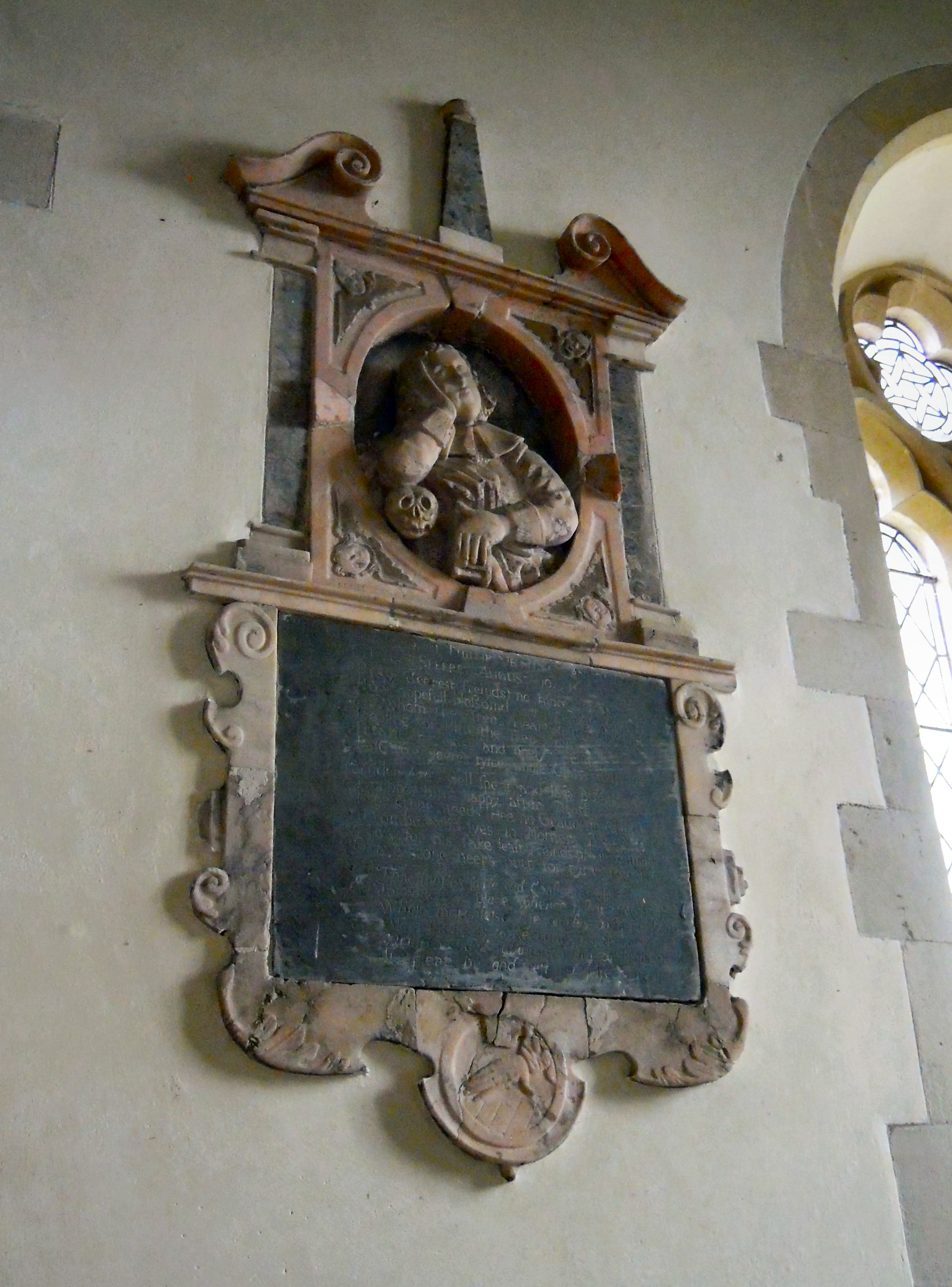
Demi-figure memorial to Phillip Vening who died in 1658 aged six

In the chancel are two 19th-century piscinae, that on the right being fitted with part of a 14th-century cusped head; the nearby panelled reredos is late Victorian, as are the boarded waggon roof to the chancel and the arch-braced roofs to the nave and the south aisle. The chancel has a two-bay arcade to the north leading to the Orleigh Chapel dating to the 14th century while the chancel arch is of the 19th century. The nave has a 15th-century five-bay arcade on its south side. In the chancel are 19th-century choir stalls, benches, pulpit, lectern and tower screen. The pulpit contains eight oak panels from a previous three-decker pulpit in the church. The unusual urn-shaped font is carved from local stone with gadrooning and dates to 1771.

The south aisle has five bays to the nave and is fitted with Decorated-style windows with the string course continuing above the 16th-century stone chamfered and carved pointed-arched priest's door. The gabled porch dates to the 15th century, while an 18th-century sundial is fitted above the 15th-century doorway. Inside the porch a 14th-century stoup can be found to the right while an image niche above the Norman doorway dates to about 1200. This doorway is decorated with a round arch of three orders with carved beakhead and chevron ornamentation.

The three-stage church tower to the west of the building is 76 feet high and it and the three-light Perpendicular window are 15th-century. The peal of six bells were recast in the village in 1825 and again in 1899 by John Taylor of Loughborough, the founder of which was born in the village and who is commemorated by a brass plaque in the church.

== The churchyard ==
The churchyard is the burial place of local Anglicans and Methodists and formerly of Bible Christians. In the churchyard are three burials from World War II with their distinctive Commonwealth War Graves Commission headstones.

== Monuments ==
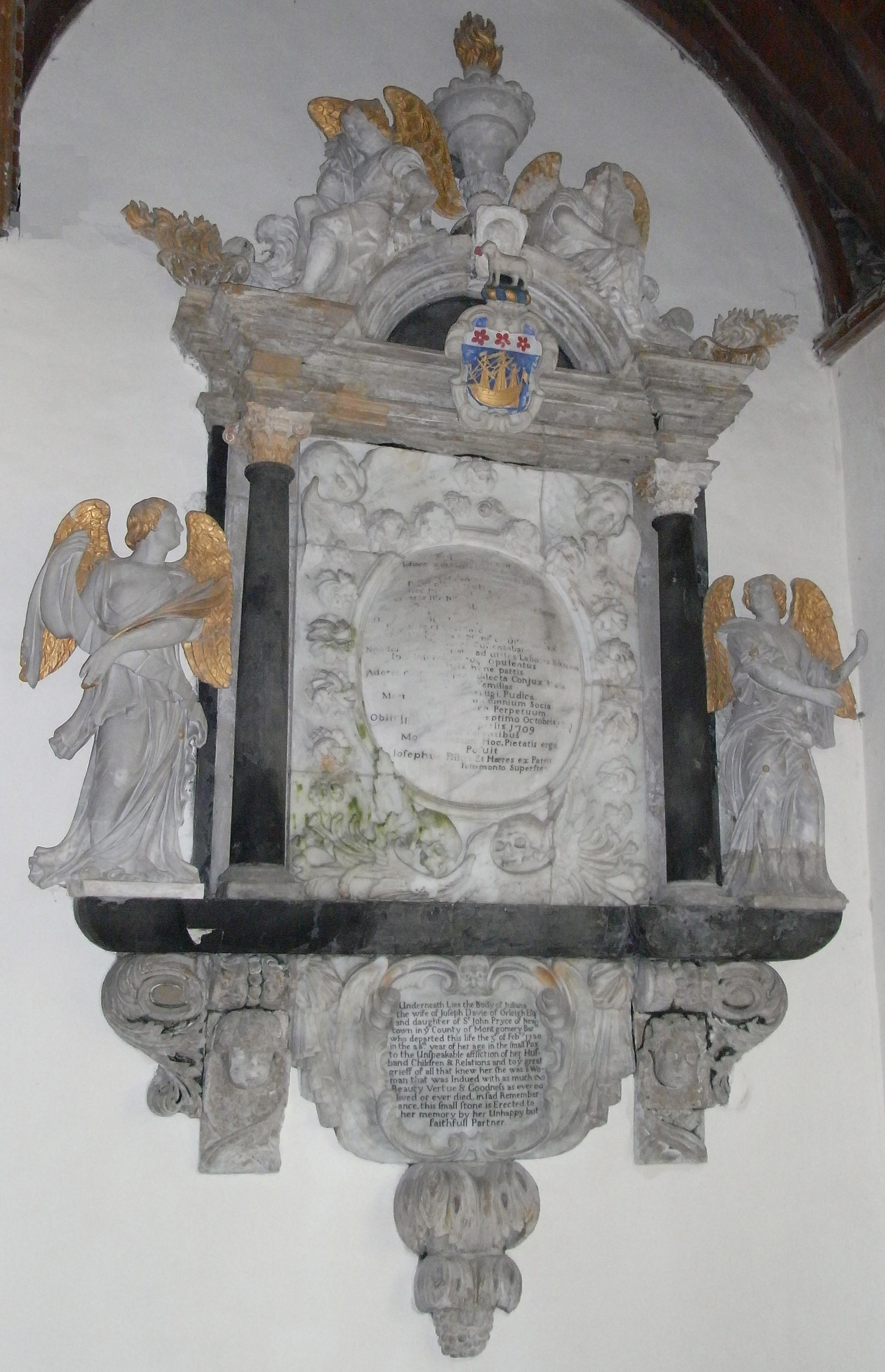
Wall monument to John Davie (died 1710), tobacco merchant of Bideford

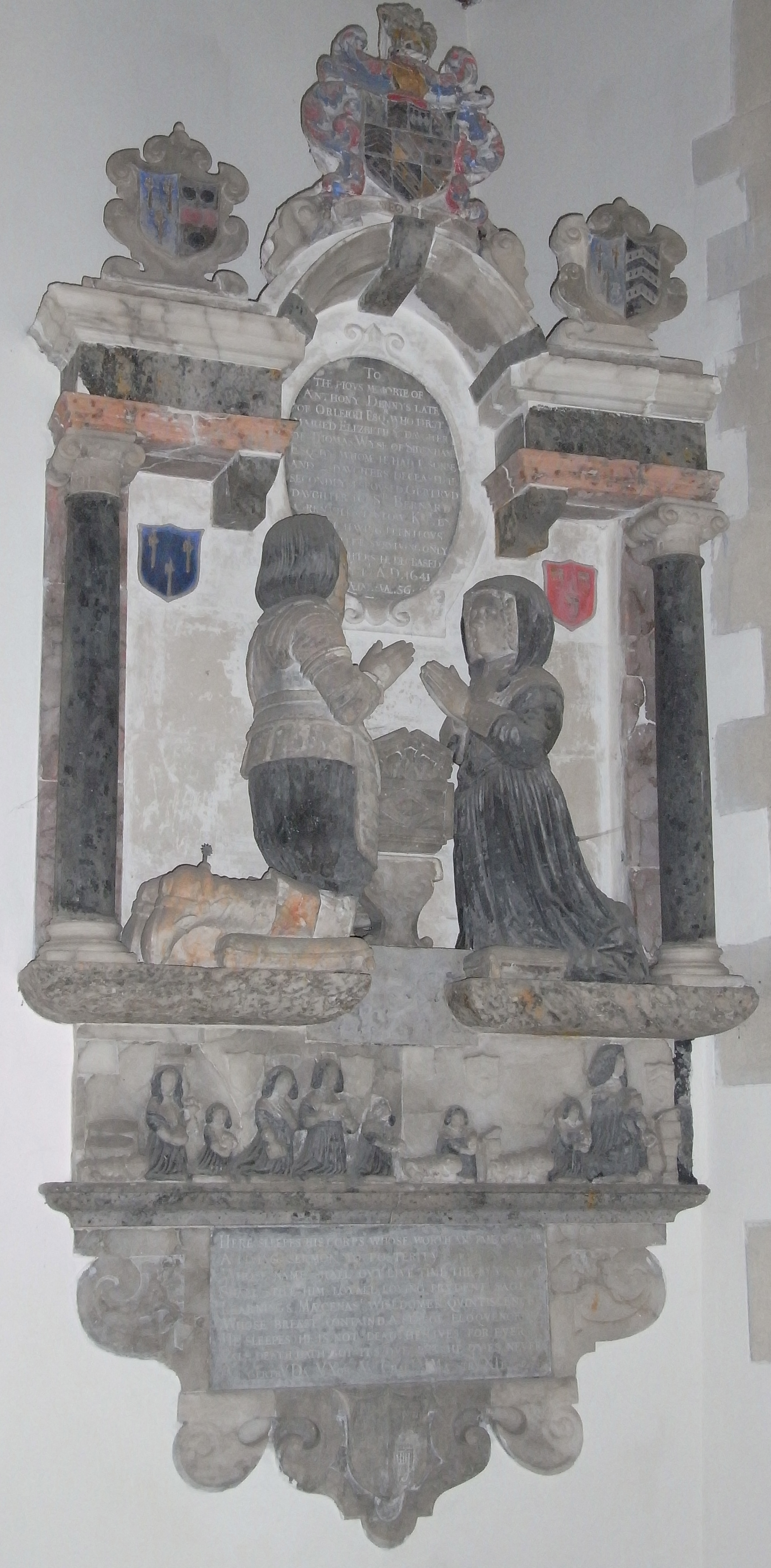
The mural monument of 1643 in the "Orleigh Chapel" to Anthony and Gertrude Dennis

In the Orleigh Chapel is the elaborate and decorative wall monument to John Davie (1640-1710) who as an alderman in 1682 took statements in the Bideford witch trial. The monument also commemorates his wife Mary (died 1709) while the lower inscription records the death of their daughter-in-law Juliana Davie who died in 1720 of smallpox. In 1684 he bought Orleigh Court in Buckland Brewer.

Nearby is the mural monument to Anthony Dennis (died 1641) of Orleigh Court and his second wife Gertrude Grenville flanked by Ionic columns. Beneath them are figures of his eleven children, eight of whom are kneeling and three lying down, indicating their deaths in infancy. The tablet was erected in 1643.

Between these monuments is the demi-figure memorial to Phillip Vening, son of Phillip and Elizabeth Vening, who died in 1658 aged six and which is of coloured marble with inscriptions in black slate. He is shown leaning his head on his right hand, the right elbow being supported by a skull.

There are also monuments to, among others, John Taylor (1827-1906), the Loughborough bellfounder, who was born in the village. The south aisle has a stone tablet monument to Midshipman William Radford Caddy who drowned in 1823 while attempting to rescue a colleague while serving on HMS Windsor Castle and above is another to his father John Caddy (died 1822). In the south-east corner of the church are memorials to the men of the village who died during World War I and World War II.

== Gallery ==
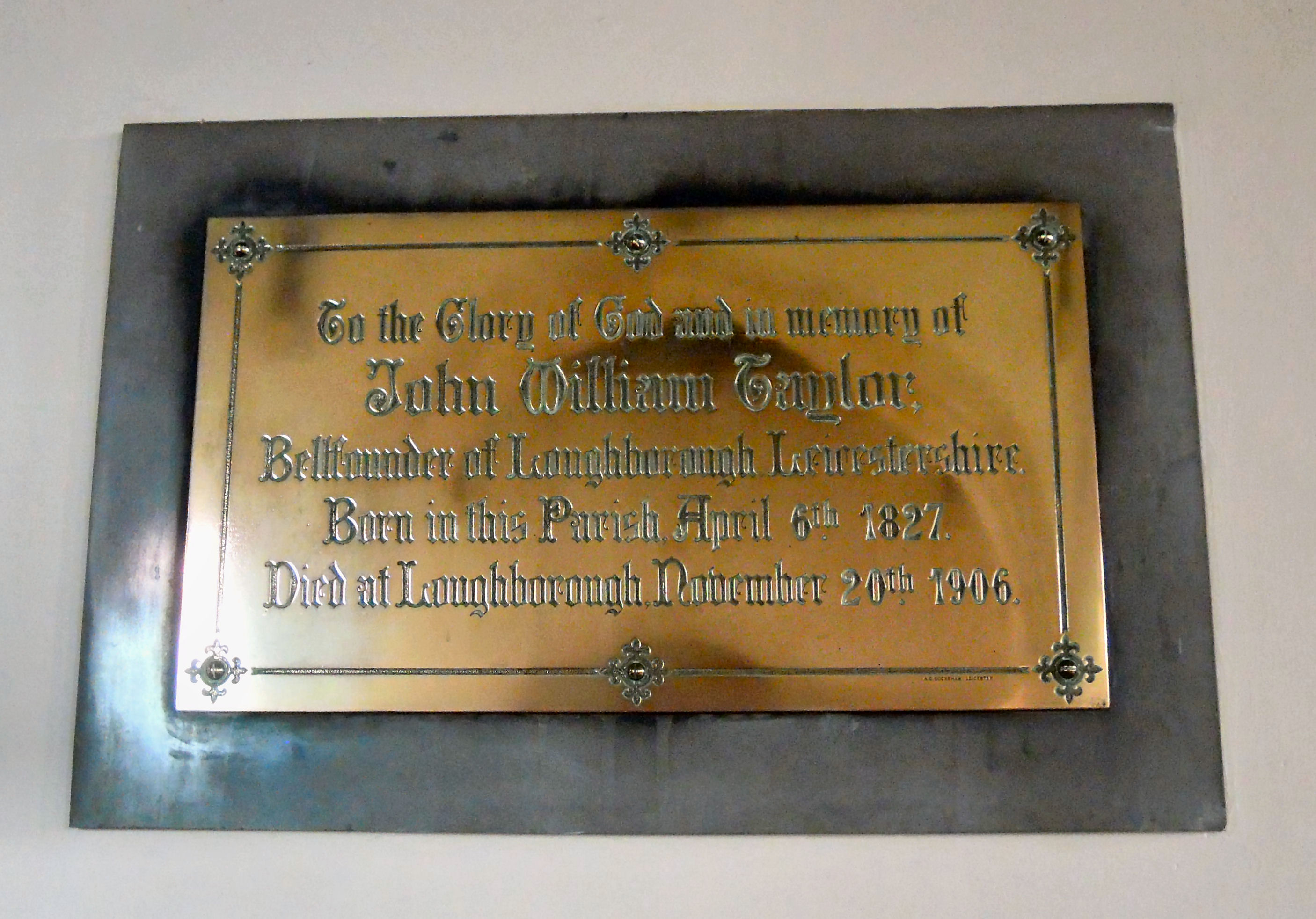
Memorial to John William Taylor, bellfounder of Loughborough

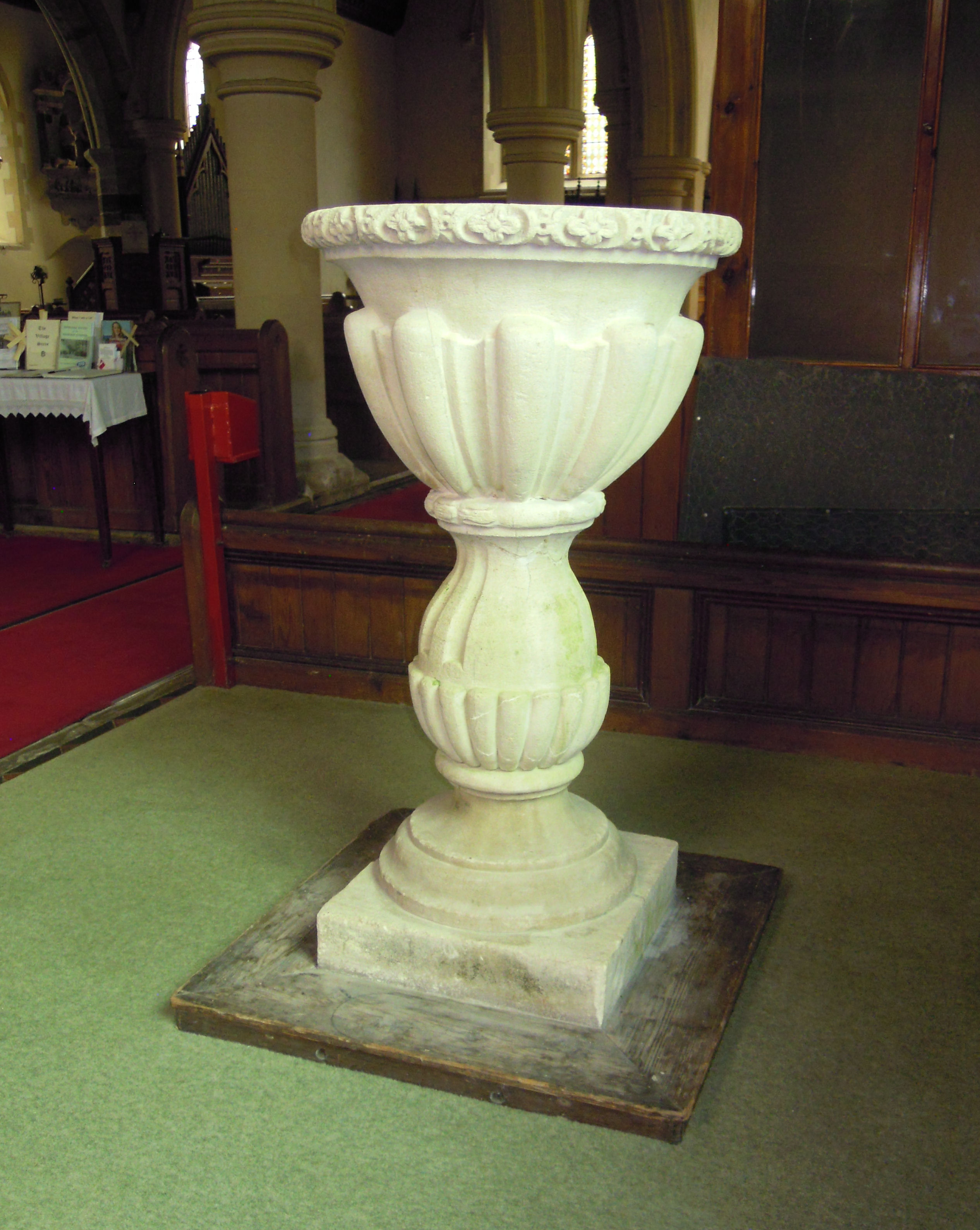
The baptismal font dates to 1771
