= Nectan of Hartland =

5th-century Welsh and Cornish saint

Saint Nectan
- The Holy Martyr Nectan
- Born: c. 468 AD; Wales
- Died: c. 510 AD; Newton, Hartland, Devon
- Venerated in: Catholic Church, Anglican Communion, Eastern Orthodox Church
- Feast: 17 June
- Patronage: Hartland, Devon

Saint Nectan, sometimes styled Saint Nectan of Hartland, was a 5th-century holy man who lived in Stoke, Hartland, in the nowadays English, and at the time Brythonic-speaking, county of Devon, where the prominent St Nectan's Church, Hartland is dedicated to him.

== Life ==
A "Life of Nectan", along with an account of the finding of his body and a collection of miracle stories, can be found in a 14th-century manuscript now in Gotha. The "Life" has been dated to the end of the 12th century.

Its account holds that Nectan was born in Ireland but moved to Wales when he was young in 423 AD, the eldest of the 24 children of King Brychan of Brycheiniog (now Brecknock in Wales). Nectan heard of the great hermit of the Egyptian desert, Saint Anthony, and was inspired to imitate his way of life. Seeking greater solitude, Nectan and his companions left Wales, intending to settle wherever their boat happened to land. Nectan and his companions wound up on the northern coast of Devon at Hartland, where they lived for several years in a dense forest. The saint's family would visit him there on the last day of the year. Later, he relocated to a remote valley with a spring.

At Hartland, Nectan lived in the solitude of a remote valley where he helped a swineherd recover his lost pigs and in turn was given a gift of two cows. Nectan's cows were stolen and after finding them he attempted to convert the robbers to the Christian faith. In return, he was attacked by robbers who cut off his head. The same authority says that he picked his head up and walked back to his well before collapsing and dying. Seeing this, the man who killed St Nectan went out of his mind, but the other thief buried him. From that time, miracles began to take place at St Nectan's tomb. Local tradition says that wherever the blood from Nectan's severed head fell, foxgloves grew.

Nectan is also associated with St Nectan's Glen and Waterfall at Trethevy, near Tintagel, in Cornwall, where it is claimed he spent some time as a hermit. Nectan is believed to have sited his hermitage above the waterfall. According to legend, he rang a silver bell in times of stormy weather to warn shipping of the perils of the rocks at the mouth of the Rocky Valley.

Nectan is also said to have appeared in 937, on the eve of the Battle of Brunanburh. A young man from Hartland felt himself afflicted with the plague and called upon God and St Nectan to help him. Nectan appeared to the young man just after midnight and touched the afflicted area of his body, healing him. When King Athelstan heard of this, asked for more information about St Nectan. The young man urged the king to have faith in St Nectan and he would be victorious. After the battle, Athelstan visited Hartland and donated property to the saint's church.

== Veneration ==
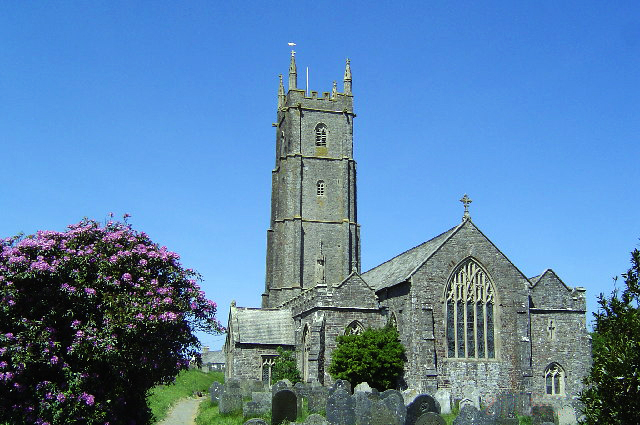
Church of Saint Nectan at Stoke by Hartland

After Nectan's death, a considerable cult grew up around his shrine and this continued to be popular throughout the Middle Ages, supported both by Saxon kings and Norman lords. Lyfing, Bishop of Crediton, approved the translation of his body as an accomplished fact, providing bells, lead for the roof, and a sculptured reliquary for the church. Furthermore, Nectan's staff was decorated with gold, silver and jewels. Manors were given to the church to endow it against pirates.

The church and shrine were restored and in the possession of the Augustinian canons from the adjoining Hartland Abbey from the 12th century until such monastic orders were disestablished during the Reformation. A number of other churches in Devon are dedicated to St Nectan, but only two ancient ones: Welcombe, just south of Hartland, and probably originally Ashton (now St John the Baptist). There is also a medieval chapel of Saint Nectan near St Winnow in Cornwall as well as a church dedicated to St Nectan in the village of Ashcombe in Devon.

Nectan's feast day is 17 June, the traditional day of his death (traditionally around 510), which was kept in Launceston, Exeter and Wells; there is still a tradition of taking foxgloves to his well on that day. Other dates include the 18 May, 14 February and 4 December (the date of his translation).

=== Patronage ===
Nectan is the patron saint of Hartland, Devon.

== See also ==
- St Nectan's Church, Welcombe
