= John Davie =

English merchant (1640–1710)

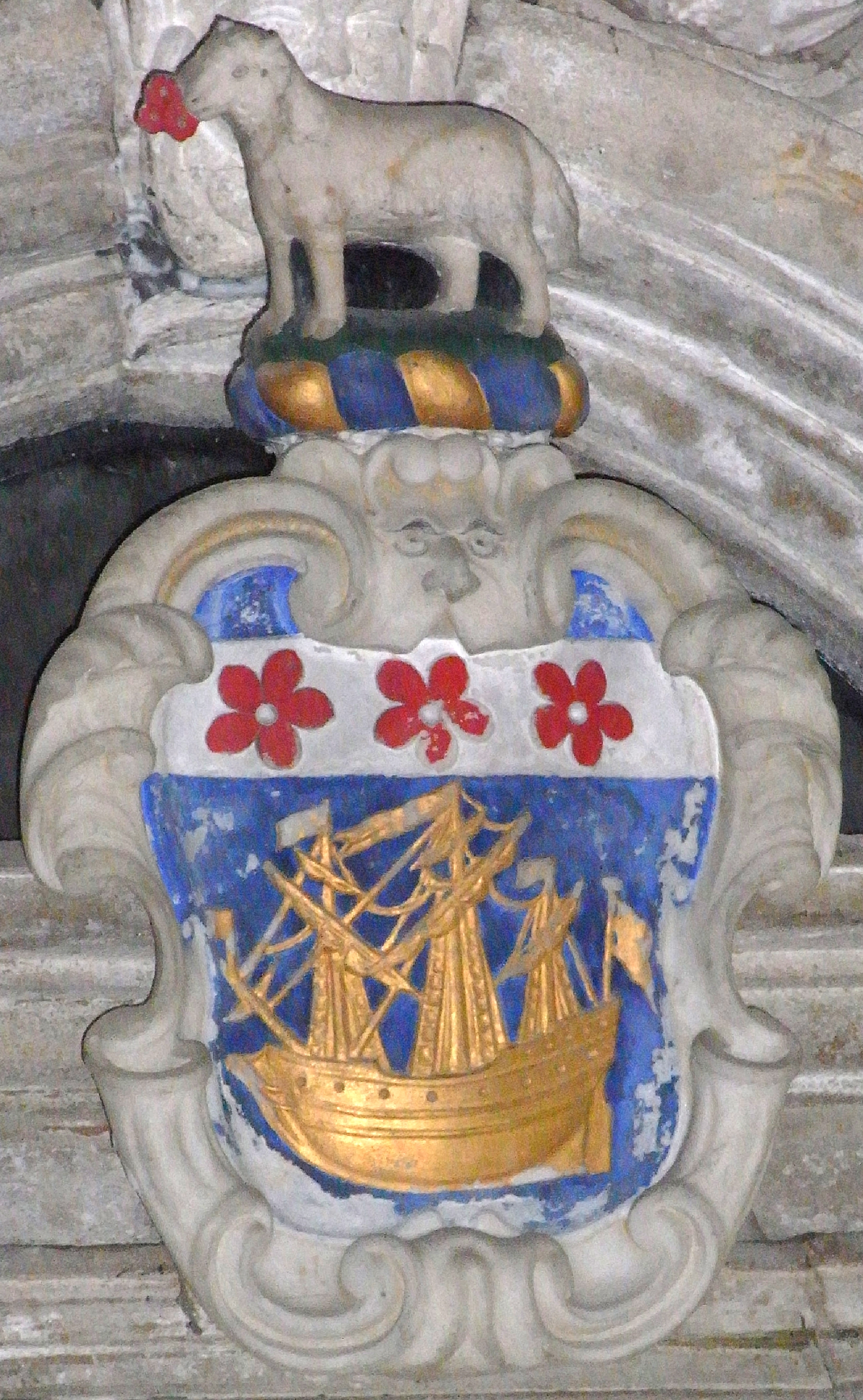
Arms of John Davie (died 1710) of Orleigh Court: A ship with two masts or the sails trussed up and twisted to the masts argent adorned with flags charged with the cross of England on a chief of the second three cinquefoils pierced gules; crest: A mount vert thereon a lamb passant argent in the mouth a sprig of cinquefoil gules slipped vert. Above the Davie mural monument in Buckland Brewer Church, North Devon

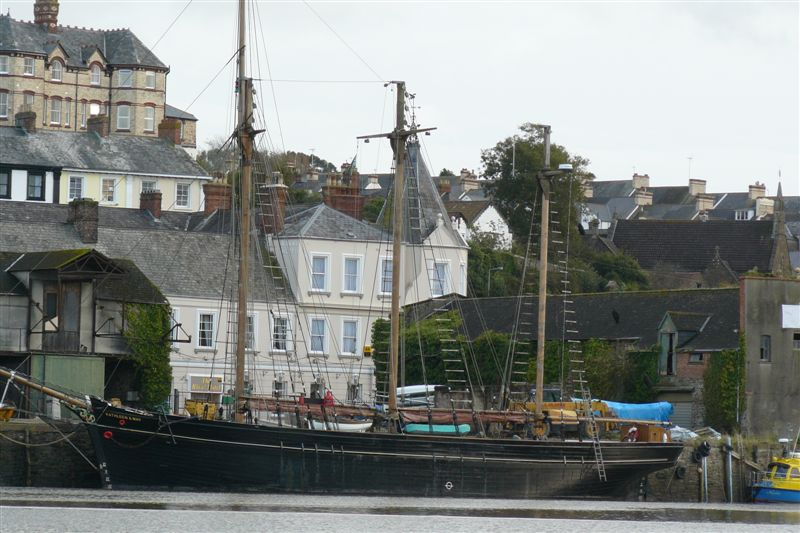
Colonial House (now the Royal Hotel), East-the-Water, Bideford, built by John Davie, in which original decorative plaster ceilings survive, of significant architectural and historic importance. In front is moored the ship Kathleen and May

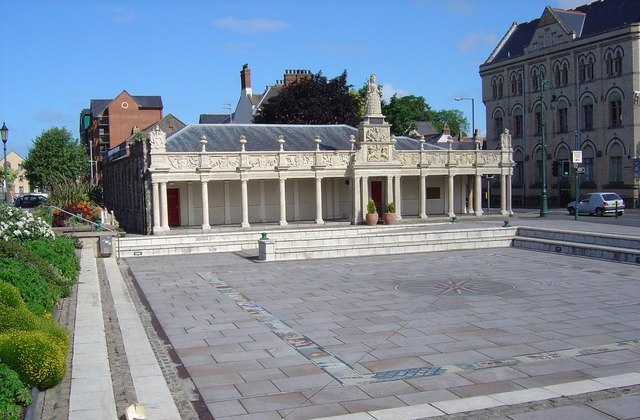
The arms of Davie appear as one of about 10 sculpted in stone on the frieze of the Mercantile Exchange (now called Queen Anne's Walk) in Barnstaple built in 1708 on the quayside. John Davie may therefore have been a contributor to the building costs, and was possibly a user of the Exchange. The arms of Incledon and Clevland also appear, two of his sons-in-law

John Davie (1640–1710) of Orleigh Court in the parish of Buckland Brewer, Devon, England, was a prominent tobacco merchant from Bideford, Devon. His Bideford town house which he built in 1688, was Colonial House, now the Royal Hotel, in which survive several 17th-century decorative plasterwork ceilings, said by Pevsner & Cherry (2004) to be amongst the best in Devon, and a grand staircase.

== Origins ==
John Davie was the son of John Davie by his wife Marie Sutton who were married in 1638. The Devon topographer Rev. John Swete wrote in 1797 of the family's origin: "The family of Davie is supposed to have assumed its appellation from de Via, or de Way, their antient seat in or near the parish of Harwood (possibly Horwood, 3 miles east) three miles south east of Biddeford. The place also where this name long flourished was Uppecott in the parish of Beauford near Great Torrington which hereditarily descended unto it from Gilbert (surnamed thereof) who owned it in Edward II's reign. Of this stock is Sir J. Davie of Creedy".

== Career ==
He was active in the tobacco trade, of which Bideford was one of the main centres in England. In 1682 he was an alderman and took statements in the Bideford witch trial. In 1684 he bought Orleigh Court in the parish of Buckland Brewer, near Bideford.

== Marriage and progeny ==
He married Mary Luscombe (died 1709) by whom he had the following progeny:

- Joseph Davie (died November 1723), who inherited Orleigh Court. His grandson was John III Davie (died 1793) who in 1763 married Eleanora Basset, sister and heiress of Col. Francis Basset (died 1802) of Heanton Court, lord of the manors of Heanton Punchardon and Umberleigh, the last male member of the senior line of the Basset family, one of the leading ancient gentry families of North Devon. John III's son was Joseph Davie Basset (1764–1846), who in accordance with the requirements of his maternal inheritance adopted the surname Basset. He sold Orleigh in 1807 and in 1825 built Watermouth Castle in the parish of Berrynarbor, Devon, as his new residence.
- Henrietta Maria Davie, who on 6 May 1700 married Walter Moyle, MP.
- Anne Davie, who in 1704 married Commander William Clevland (1664–1734), Royal Navy, of Tapeley in the parish of Westleigh, near Bideford, and was the mother of John Clevland, Secretary to the Admiralty and William Clevland who became King of the Banana Islands.
- Mary Davie (1680–1710), who in 1698 at Bideford married Henry Incledon (1671–1736) of Buckland House in the parish of Braunton, Devon. Her elaborate mural monument, displaying the arms of Davie, survives in Braunton Church.

== Mural monument ==
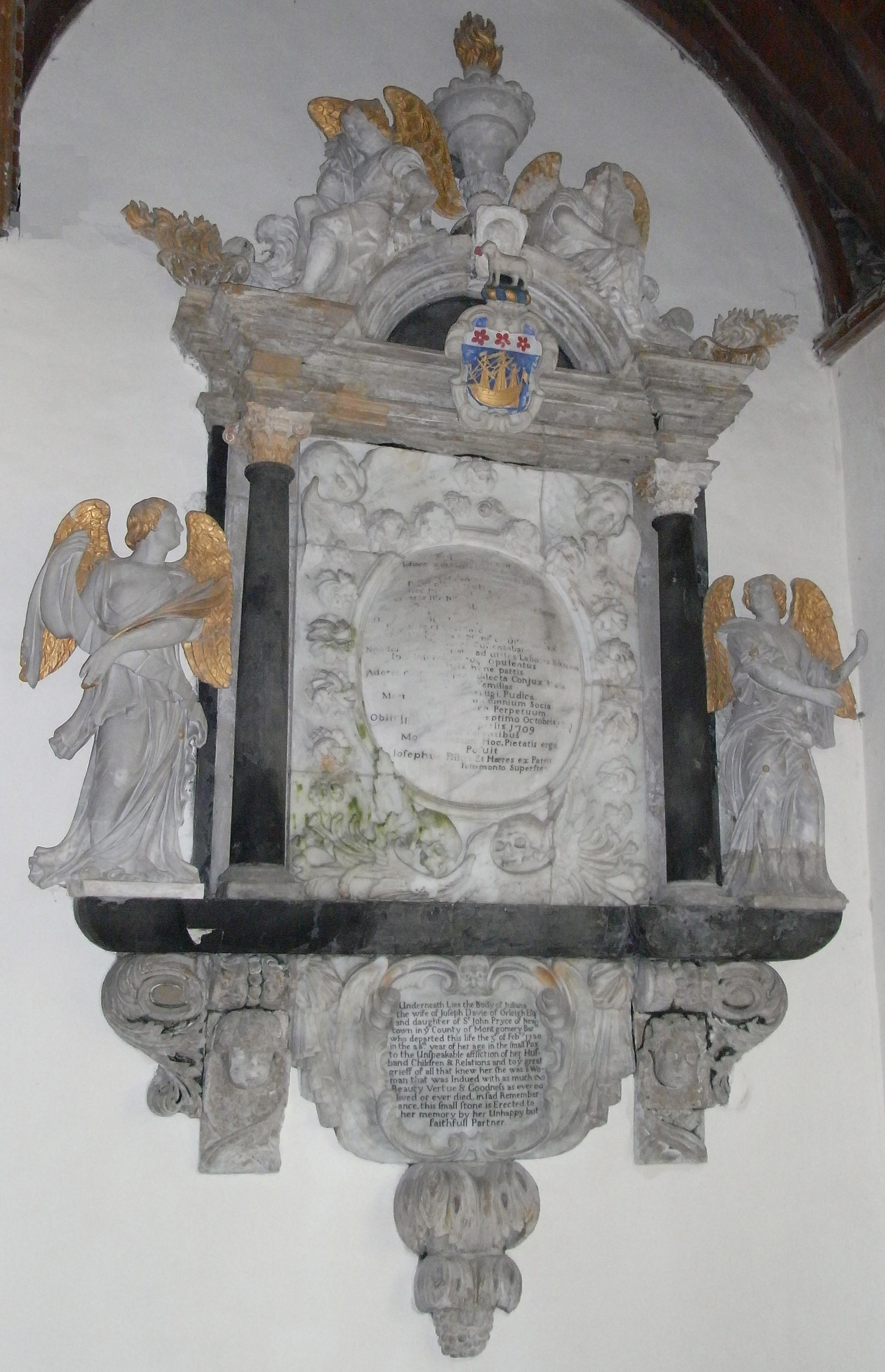
Mural monument to John Davie (died 1710) and his wife, west wall of North Aisle Chapel ("Orleigh Chapel"), Buckland Brewer Church, Devon

A mural monument to John Davie (died 1710) and his wife Mary survives, affixed high on the west wall of the North Aisle Chapel ("Orleigh Chapel"), in Buckland Brewer Church, Devon. On a large central white marble roundel is inscribed the following Latin text, now partly worn-away, transcribed by W.H. Rogers:

Subtus jacent Johannes et Mariaa Davie de Orleigh in comitatu Devoniae par amantissimum. Felici olim juncti connubio nec jam dissiti sepulchro. Mercator ille hisce regionibus praeclarus consiliis operibus exemplo Biddefordensibus suis ita benefecit ut commercium heic loci cum illo simul et floruisse et cecidisse paene videatur. Charitate plenus optima et diffusissima pauperes sustentabat non tam dando quam ad utiles labores Bovocando (sic, i.e. PRovocando) ipse interea factus opulentus divitiis bene partis. Aderat omni tempore dilecta conjux Maria mater familias pia constans frugi pudica. Marito fida curarum omnium socia et solamen perpetuum. Obiit: hic vicesimo septimo Octobris 1710, illa quarto Aprilis 1709. Optimis parentibus monumentum hoc pietatis ergo posuit Josephus filius et haeres ex patris testimento superstes.

Which may be translated into English literally as follows:

Below lie John and Mary Davie of Orleigh in the county of Devon, equally loving. Once fortunate joined in marriage yet now split asunder by the grave. He was a famous merchant in these regions, in his counsel, works. By his example thus he benefitted his fellow Bidefordians, to the extent that it almost seemed commerce of that place seemed both to have flourished and to have fallen with him. Full with charity the best and most widespread he was sustaining the poor not so much by giving as by calling them forth to useful labours. Meanwhile he himself was made wealthy with riches well-gained. In all this time was present his beloved wife Mary, a pious mother of a household, pious, constant, frugal and modest. A perpetual comfort and a faithful companion of all his cares. They died: he, on the 27th of October 1710; she, on the 4th of April 1709. To the best parents this monument of piety therefore Joseph, surviving, placed, his son and heir by the will of his father.

On a tablet underneath is inscribed:

Underneath lies the body of Juliana the wife of Joseph Davie of Orleigh, Esq., and daughter of sr. John Pryce of Newtown in ye County of Montgomery, Bar(on)et. who departed this life the 5th of Febry. 1720 in the 28th year of her age in the small pox to the unspeakable affliction of her husband children and relations and to ye great grieff of all that knew her. She was a woman that was indued with as much beauty virtue and goodness as ever lived or ever died. In sad remembrance this small stone is erected to her memory by her unhappy but faithfull partner.

== Sources ==
- Baring-Gould, Sabine. Devonshire Characters and Strange Events, London, 1908
- Lang, George. Entwisted Tongues: Comparative Creole Literatures, Amsterdam and New York, 1999
- Rogers, W.H., "Buckland Brewer", first published 1938, reprinted 2000, Snetzler, M.F. (Ed.), Barcott, Buckland Brewer
