= Buckland Brewer =

Village in Devon, England

Coordinates: 50.965°N 4.252°W

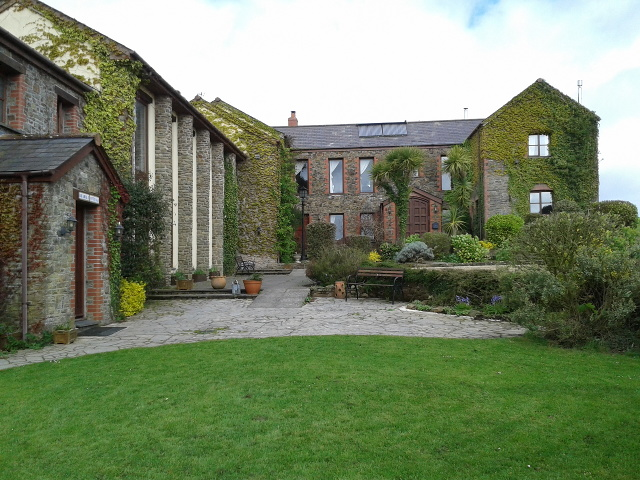
- Barton Court

- Location within Devon
- Population: 794 (2011 Census)
- OS grid reference: SS4220
- District: Torridge
- Shire county: Devon
- Region: South West
- Country: England
- Sovereign state: United Kingdom
- Post town: Bideford
- Postcode district: EX39
- Dialling code: 01237
- Police: Devon and Cornwall
- Fire: Devon and Somerset
- Ambulance: South Western
- UK Parliament: Torridge and Tavistock

Buckland Brewer is a village and civil parish in the Torridge district of Devon, England, 4.7 miles south of Bideford. Historically the parish formed part of Shebbear Hundred. According to the 2001 census it had a population of 777, increasing to 794 at the 2011 census The village is part of Waldon electoral ward. The population for this at the same census was 1,679.

== Population ==
Historical population figures show a variable trend of increased and decreased population. Torridge District Council historical data shows the following populations:

- 1801: 872
- 1901: 644
- 2001: 777

== Religion ==
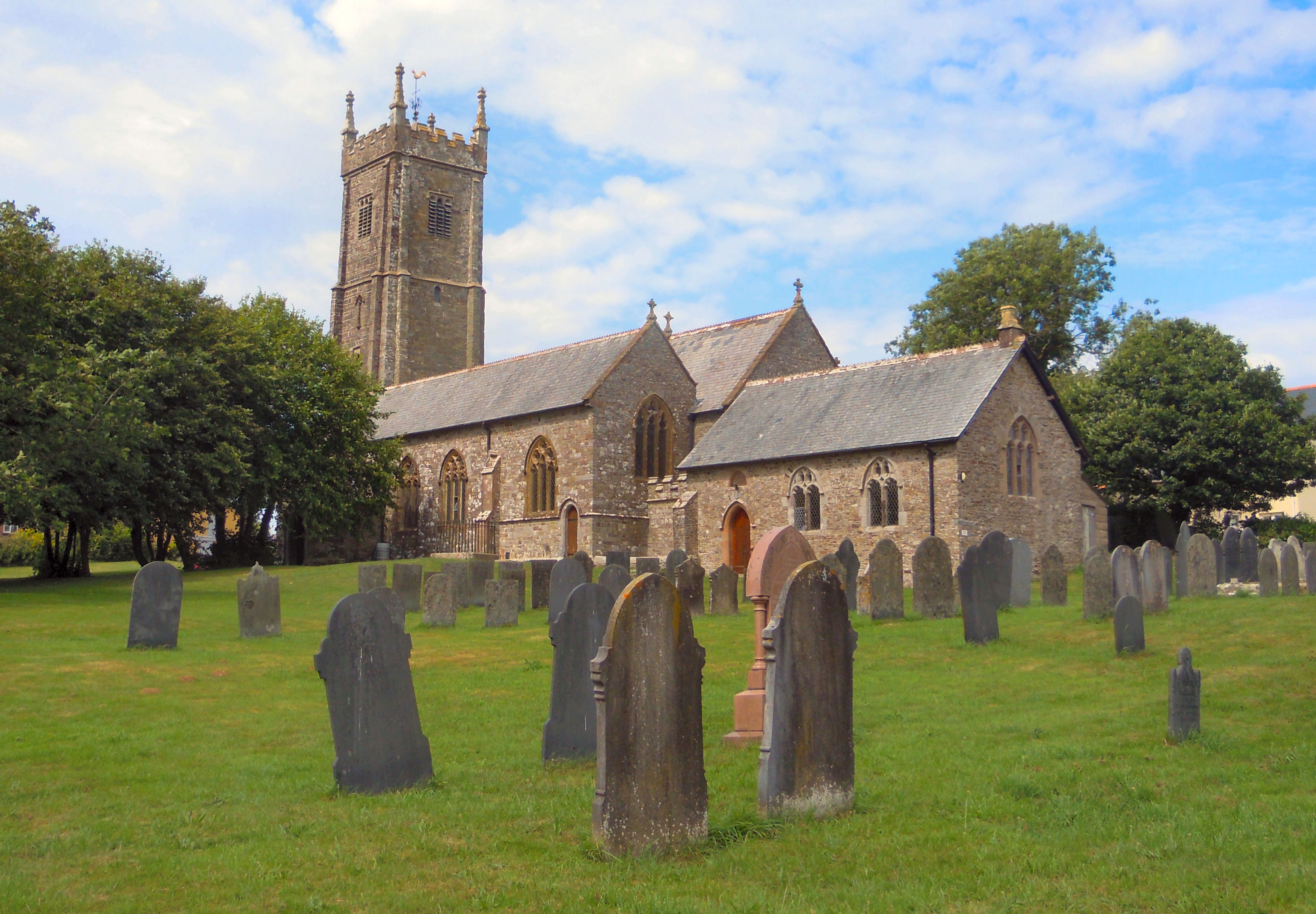
The church of St Mary and St Benedict

The parish church of St Mary and St Benedict (Church of England) is part of the benefice of the Hartland Coast Team Ministry. This falls within Hartland Deanery, in the Archdeaconry of Barnstaple. This is in the Diocese of Exeter.

The church tower is over 500 years old, with a Norman stoup and doorway. There are monuments to, among others, John William Taylor of John Taylor & Co, the Loughborough bellfounder, who was born here.

There is also a Methodist chapel in the village.

== Services ==
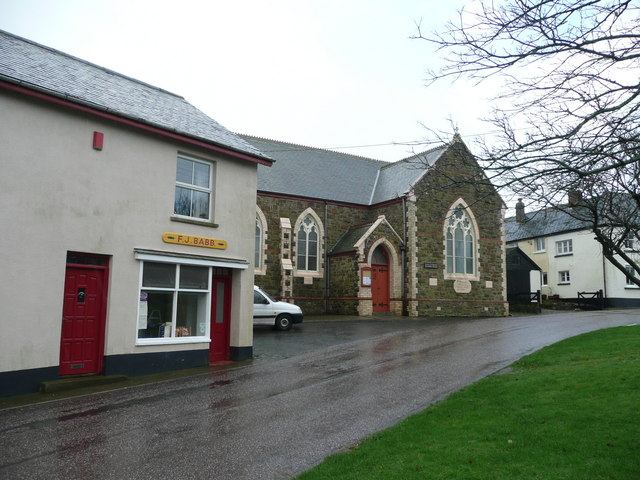
The former butcher's shop and Methodist church - elements of village life in Buckland Brewer

The Butcher's shop closed at the end of 2013.

The Coach & Horses Inn is a 13th-century inn and its history is well documented.

The village hall is provided for the use of parishioners.

== School ==
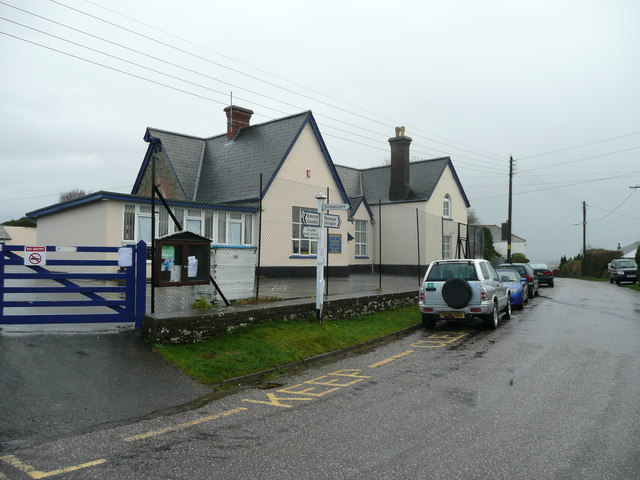
Buckland Brewer Community Primary School on a winter's day

Buckland Brewer Community Primary School is a mixed gender, non-denominational school for 5- to 11-year-olds. The school is currently federated with Parkham Primary school with around 90 pupils between them.

It is a very small primary school at the centre of the village. The Victorian church school building has been considerably modified and, with a mobile temporary classroom, now provides space for two classes, one for reception and Years 1 and 2, and the other for Years 3 to 6. Most pupils move to Great Torrington School in Year 7, although some have been known to opt for Bideford College or one of the local private schools such as Kingsley or Shebbear College.

A pre-school operates in the village hall, which caters for the under 5's. There is a close relationship between school and pre-school.

== Local transport ==
A local bus service operated by Stagecoach serves the village, operating to and from Bradworthy, Bideford and Barnstaple and other villages.

== Sport ==
=== Football ===
The village had a successful football team, Buckland Brewer FC, managed by John Adams. Having formed in 1976, the club is a member of the North Devon Football League. The club has won several honours, including:

- Division 2 Winners: 2008/9
- Bideford Tool League Cup: 2004/5
- North Devon Challenge Cup Runners Up: 76/7, 94/5, 95/6
- North Devon Intermediate Cup Runners Up: 80/1
- Arlington Cup: 77/8
- Arlington Cup Runners Up: 84/5
- Intermediate II Division Winners: 77/8

The club ran a Youth team from 1996 to 1999, and won the following honours in the North Devon Scaffolding Invitation Youth League:

- Under 16 Plate Winners: 98/99
- Under 15 Plate Runners Up: 97/8

=== Skittles ===
The village has a skittles club that operates several teams in the North Devon leagues.

=== Cricket ===
There is a cricket team in the village. They are not in any league.

== Historic estates ==
=== Orleigh ===
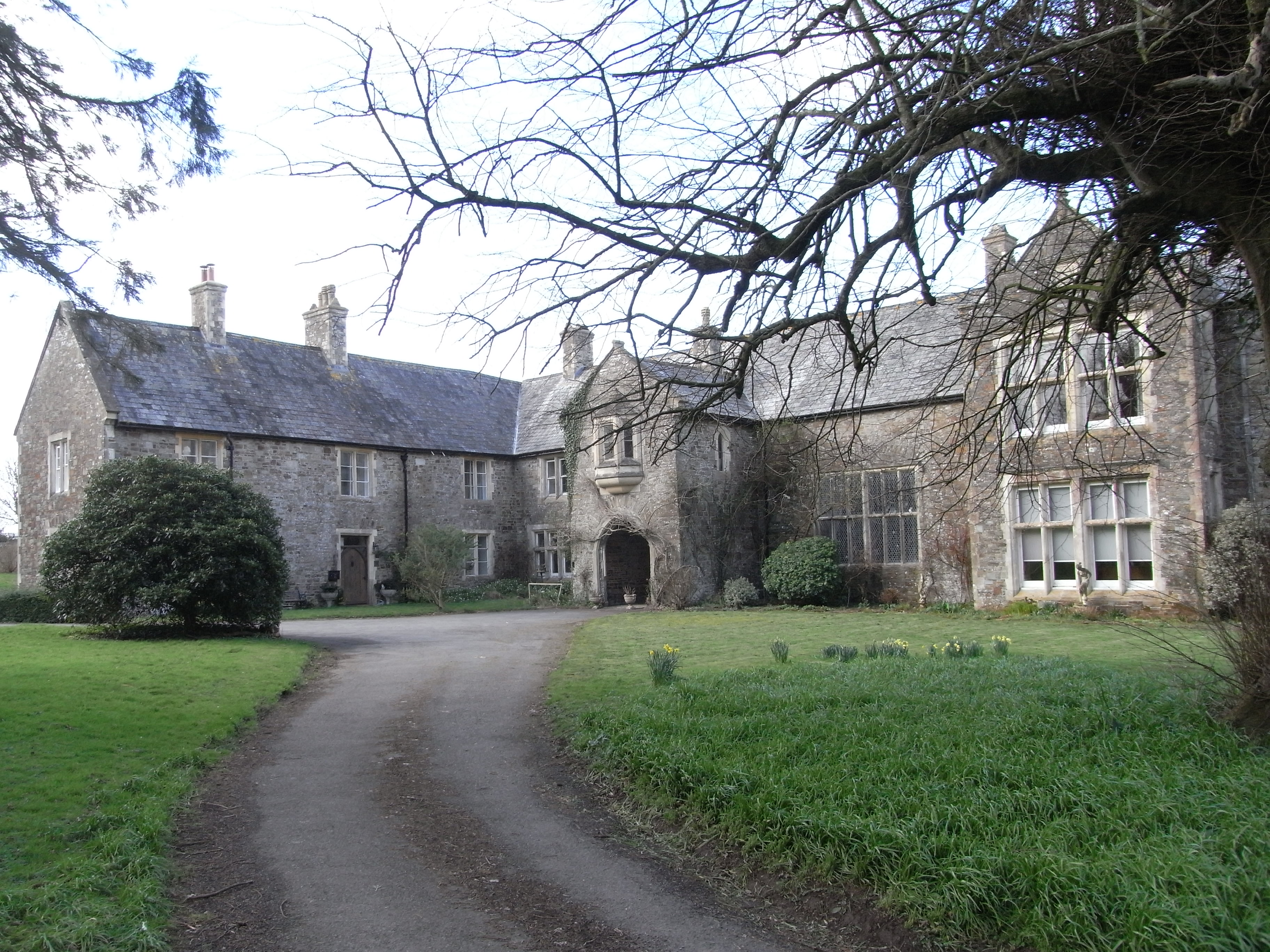
Orleigh Court

Orleigh Court is a late medieval house built in Buckland Brewer. John Davie bought the building in 1684. It was the birthplace of John Hanning Speke. It was substantially altered in the early 18th century and remodelled after 1869. It was redeveloped for multiple occupancy in the 1980s and is currently divided into approximately twelve apartments.

=== Vielstone ===
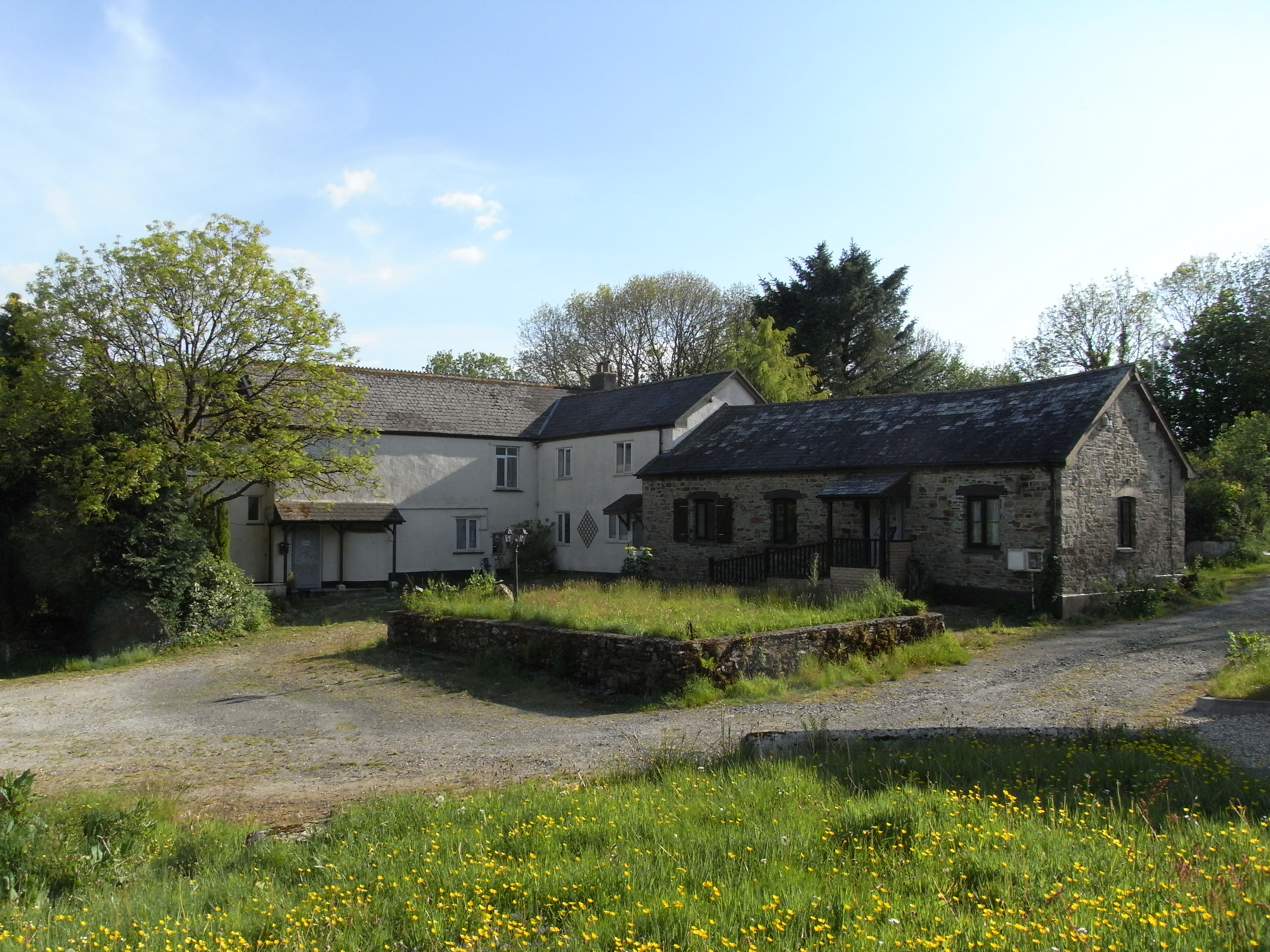
Vielstone in 2013

The estate of Vielstone is the earliest known residence of the influential Stevens family, later of Smythacott in Frithelstock, Winscott House in Peters Marland and Cross, Little Torrington.

Henry Stevens (1617 – after 1675) of Vielstone, eldest son and heir of William Stevens of Great Torrington, married Judith Hancock, daughter of John Hancock, lord of the Manor of Combe Martin. Judith Hancock's mural monument survives in the parish church at Great Torrington.

In the early 21st century, Vielstone is a modest farmhouse, surrounded by converted farm buildings and new bungalows. It was operated by Atlas Project Team (Holdings) Ltd as a residential home until about 2012 when its standards of care reached unacceptably low levels which resulted in its closure and insolvency. On behalf of the administrator Grant Thornton UK LLP it was offered for sale in 2013 by Webbers estate agents for £900,000, including the outbuildings converted into dwellings, and 6 acres of land.

== Notable residents ==
- Edward Capern, postman-turned-poet, (admired by Tennyson, Charles Kingsley and Walter Savage Landor), lived here in the 19th century
- John Hanning Speke, explorer and officer in the British Indian Army, was born here in 1827. He is most famous for his three exploratory expeditions into Africa in search for the source of the Nile. He was the first European to reach Lake Victoria, which he named after the Queen.
- John Davie, merchant
- The bellfounder John William Taylor (1827–1906) of John Taylor & Co was born here.
