= Welcombe =

Village and civil parish in north Devon, England

Coordinates: 50°56′N 4°31′W

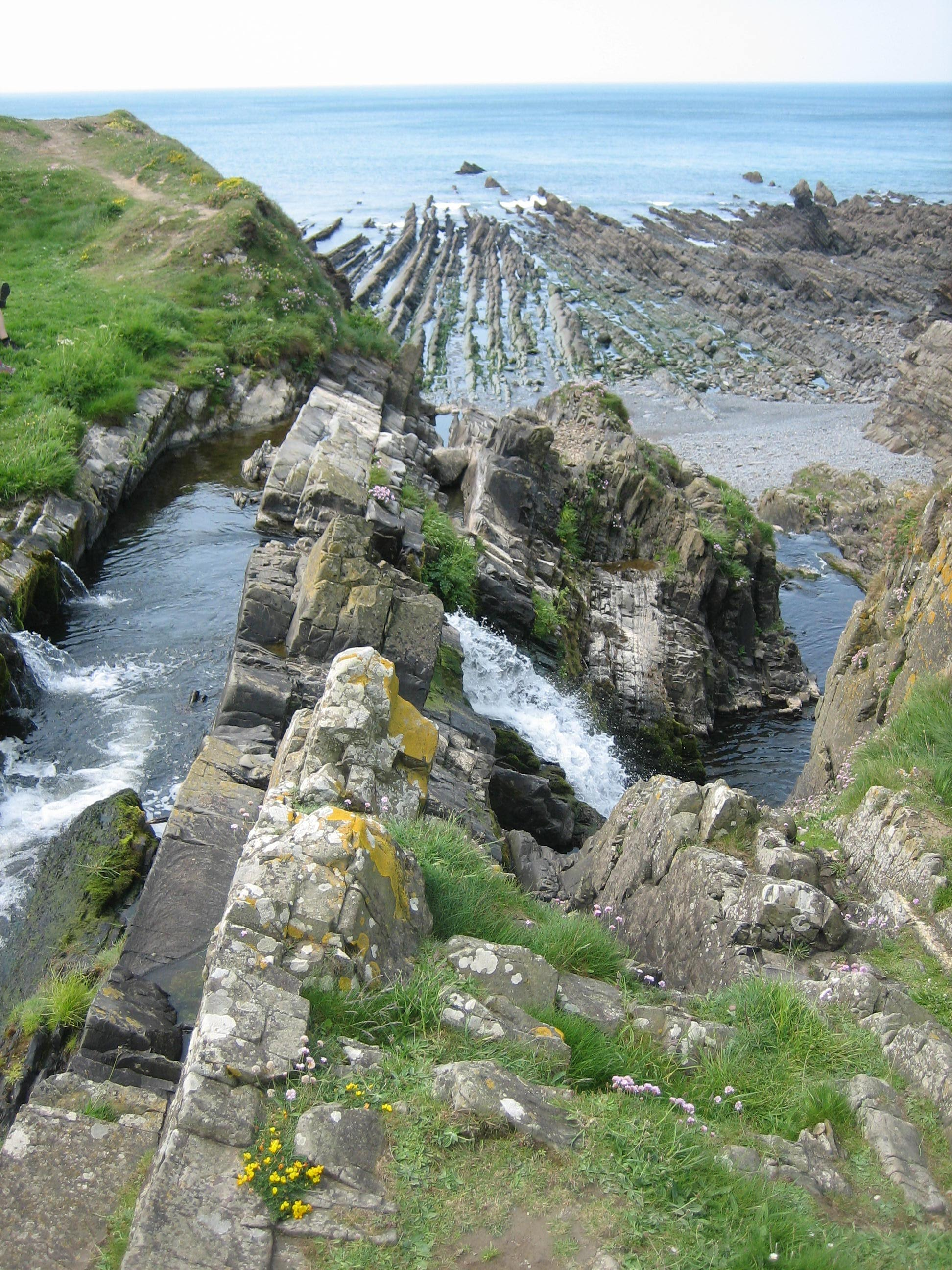
- Water Falls at Welcombe Mouth

- Location within Devon
- Population: 187 (2011 census)
- Civil parish: Welcombe
- District: Torridge
- Shire county: Devon
- Region: South West
- Country: England
- Sovereign state: United Kingdom

Welcombe is a village and civil parish on the coast of north Devon, England, just north of the border with Cornwall. It is part of the district of Torridge. The population taken at the 2011 census was 187.

It is accessible via the A39 and has a beach called Welcombe Mouth, reached by a very narrow road. Its parish church, Welcombe Parish Church, is one of only four ancient dedications to Saint Nectan. Welcombe comprises several smaller communities including Welcombe Cross, Darracot, Upcott and Mead. There is a local pottery, pub, The Old Smithy Inn and village stores. There are two small campsites in the area and the South West Coast Path offers views to Lundy.

== See also ==
- North Devon Coast AONB
