= George Basset =

English politician

Member of Parliament for Launceston
- In office 1563; 1572

Member of Parliament for Bossiney
- In office 1571

Personal details
- Born: c. 1524
- Died: c. 1580 (aged 55–56)
- Spouse: Jaquet Coffin
- Children: 1+
- Parents: John Basset (father); Honor Grenville (mother)
- Relatives: Basset family Katharine Basset (sister); Anne Bassett (sister); James Bassett (brother); John Basset (brother); Thomas Grenville (grandfather); Robert Basset (grandson); Henry Ashley (nephew); Arthur Bassett (nephew)

Arms of Basset: Barry wavy of six or and gules

George Basset (c. 1524 – c. 1580), of Tehidy in the parish of Illogan, near Redruth in Cornwall, was an English politician.

== Biography ==
Basset was a Member of Parliament for Launceston, Cornwall, in 1563 and 1572, and for Bossiney, Cornwall, in 1571. He was patron of the advowson of Camborne in Cornwall. He was granted by the crown the estate of Columbjohn in Devon, formerly a possession of the Courtenay family, following the 1538 attainder and execution of Henry Courtenay, 1st Marquess of Exeter, a relative of his step-father Arthur Plantagenet, 1st Viscount Lisle.

He was the second son of Sir John Basset (1462–1528) of Umberleigh in Devon by his second wife Honor Grenville, who was the sister of Sir Richard Grenville the Elder (died 1550) and later wife of Arthur Plantagenet, Viscount Lisle (an illegitimate son of King Edward IV and thus an uncle of King Henry VIII). Basset's sisters were the courtiers Katharine Basset and Anne Bassett, the latter allegedly a mistress of Henry VIII and considered as a possible sixth wife for the king. His next younger brother was James Bassett, MP, a Privy Counsellor to Queen Mary I.

Basset married Jaquet Coffin of Alwington in Devon. His son and heir James Basset (1560–1603) inherited Tehidy under a deed of entail dated 26 March 1563 made by George's nephew Sir Arthur Basset. The deed granted Tehidy to Arthur's grandmother Honor Grenville, Viscountess Lisle for her life (she died in 1566), then to her son George Basset and his wife Jaquet Coffin and the heirs male of his body.
