= Henry Ashley (MP for Dorset) =

16th-century English politician

Sir Henry Ashley
- Born: 2 October 1519
- Died: 27 December 1588 (aged 69)
- Occupation: Politician
- Spouse: Katharine Basset (m. 1547)
- Children: Henry Ashley
- Parent: Henry Ashley

Sir Henry Ashley (2 October 1519 – 27 December 1588) was an English politician.

He was the son of Henry Ashley of Wimborne St. Giles, Dorset, and succeeded his father in 1549. He was knighted in 1553.

== Career ==
Sir Henry Ashley was deputy vice-admiral for Dorset from 1551 to 1582 and keeper of the manor and forest of Holt from 1555 to 1566. He was a justice of the peace for Dorset from 1554, and for Wiltshire from 1562 and was appointed Sheriff of Somerset and Dorset for 1555–56 and 1564–65. He was commissioner for piracy for Dorset in 1565, deputy lieutenant by 1577 and colonel of musters, (Shaftesbury division) in 1587.

He was a member of parliament (MP) for Dorset in 1554 and 1563 and for Shaftesbury in 1547.

== Marriage and progeny ==
In 1547, he married Katharine Basset (b. circa 1522), a servant to Queen Anne of Cleves, the second daughter of Sir John Basset (1462–1528), KB, of Tehidy in Cornwall and Umberleigh in Devon (Sheriff of Cornwall in 1497, 1517 and 1522 and Sheriff of Devon in 1524) by his second wife, Honor Grenville (died 1566), (later Viscountess Lisle) a daughter of Sir Thomas Grenville (died 1513) of Stowe in the parish of Kilkhampton, Cornwall, and lord of the manor of Bideford in North Devon, Sheriff of Cornwall in 1481 and in 1486. By Katharine he had two sons including:

- Henry Ashley (1548 – post 1605), eldest son and heir, MP.
