= Katharine Basset =

English gentlewoman and courtier

- Born: c. 1522
- Died: after 1558
- Occupation: Courtier
- Spouse: Sir Henry Ashley (m. 1547)
- Children: Sir Henry Ashley
- Parent(s): Sir John Basset; Honor Grenville
- Relatives: Arthur Plantagenet, 1st Viscount Lisle (stepfather); John Basset (brother); Anne Basset (sister); George Basset (brother); James Basset (brother)

Katharine Basset (c. 1522 – after 1558, occasionally misnamed "Elizabeth") was an English gentlewoman who served at the court of King Henry VIII, namely in the household of Queen Anne of Cleves, and was briefly jailed for speaking against him. Three of her letters to her mother Honor Grenville survive in the Lisle Papers.

== Life ==
Basset was the second daughter of Sir John Basset (1462–1528), KB, of Tehidy in Cornwall and Umberleigh in Devon (Sheriff of Cornwall in 1497, 1517 and 1522 and Sheriff of Devon in 1524) by his second wife, Honor Grenville (died 1566; later Viscountess Lisle), a daughter of Sir Thomas Grenville (died 1513) of Stowe in the parish of Kilkhampton, Cornwall, and lord of the manor of Bideford in North Devon, Sheriff of Cornwall in 1481 and in 1486.

Her siblings were: Philippa Basset (born 1516), eldest daughter; John Basset (1518–1541), his father's eldest son and heir, a lawyer and servant of Thomas Cromwell who died aged 23; Anne Basset (born 1521), third daughter and a fellow courtier, maid of honour successively to Queens Jane Seymour, Anne of Cleves, Catherine Howard and Katharine Parr; George Basset (b.circa 1522–5), second son, MP; and James Basset, MP, third son and youngest child, a courtier first to Stephen Gardiner, Bishop of Winchester and Lord Chancellor, and later a courtier to Queen Mary I. Katharine was brought up by her mother and stepfather, Arthur Plantagenet, 1st Viscount Lisle (died 1542), Governor of Calais, uncle of King Henry VIII.

=== Career ===
==== Servant to Countess of Rutland ====
The young Katharine was sent to live in the household of Eleanor Manners, Countess of Rutland (c. 1495 – 1551), (lady-in-waiting to four wives of King Henry VIII: Anne Boleyn, Jane Seymour, Anne of Cleves and Catherine Howard) whom she served as a gentlewoman-waiter, until about 1540. During this time, her mother wrote to the Countess of Rutland, asking if "Mistress Basset" could become one of the Queen's maids, but the Countess thought no more maids would be accepted at court.

==== Servant to Anne of Cleves ====
Later after 1540 she gained a position in the household of Anne of Cleves, 4th wife of King Henry VIII from 6 January 1540 to 9 July 1540. However, she never achieved the coveted position of maid of honour, as did her sister Anne Basset, as Anne of Cleves' marriage to the king was soon annulled to facilitate his marriage to Catherine Howard. Katharine Basset was referred to thereafter simply as "The Lady Anne of Cleves' woman". Anne resided at Hever Castle, the old family seat of the Boleyn family. The pursuit of a place at court for Katharine is well documented in the Lisle Papers. In 1539, Katherine wrote to her mother:

"...Madame, the cause of my writing to your ladyship is that we hear say that the King's grace shall be married and my lord and my lady (i.e. Rutland) as yet doth hear no word of their coming up to London. Wherefore I desire your ladyship that ye will be so good lady and mother unto me as to speak so that I may be one of the queen's maids..." (signed "Katherin Bassitt")

Her mother took the opportunity of making the request via John Norris, brother of Henry Norris. On her way to England, Queen Anne of Cleves in December 1539 had an enforced stay at Calais, and Lord Lisle used his influence as Lord Deputy of Calais, on behalf of his step-daughter Katharine, to speak to the vice-chancellor of the Duchy of Cleves, Henry Olisleger, who wrote to Lord Lisle on 6 January 1540 with disappointing news as follows:

"My lord, very sorry at heart I am to advertise you that with the knowledge and goodwill of the Queen's Grace I have spoken with the king our master and also with my Lord Privy Seal (i.e. Thomas Cromwell) and the other gentlemen of the council to have Mistress Katharine, your wife's daughter, to be of the privy chamber with the queen; to the which I have had answer made me that the ladies and gentlewomen of the privy chamber were appointed before her grace's coming and that for this time patience must be had".

On 17 February 1540 Lady Rutland wrote more positively to Lady Lisle:

"My very good lady...And where ye be very desirous to have your daughter Mistress Basset to be one of the Queen's Grace's maids, and that ye would I should move her Grace in that behalf. These shall be to do your ladyship: to wit that I perceive right well the King's Highness' pleasure to be such that no more maids shall be taken in until such time as some of them that now be with the Queen's Grace be preferred. Albeit if ye will make some means unto Mother Lowe, who can do as much good in this matter as any one woman here, that she may make some means to get your said daughter with the Queen's said Grace; and in so doing I think ye shall obtain your purpose in every behalf and I for my part shall do the best I can to prefer her here for I would be right glad thereof both for the great honesty that is in her".

On 19 February 1540, Katharine wrote to her mother:

"Madame, in my humble wyse my duty to your ladyship deserving you of your daily blessing...I humbly beseech your ladyship to be good lady and mother to me, for my Lady of Rutland sayeth that Mother Lowe, the Mother of the Dutch Maids, may do much for my preferment to the Queen's Highness; so that your ladyship would send her my good token that she might the better remember me. Trusting that your ladyship would be good lady unto me in this behalf..."

The suit to the Mother of the Maids, "Mother Lowe", was successful and after 1540 Katharine was taken into the household of Anne of Cleves.

==== Arrest and questioning ====
Her sister Anne Bassett was rumoured to be a mistress of Henry VIII, by whom she was showered with great gifts and kept at court even after her stepfather Viscount Lisle had been sent to the Tower of London for alleged treason, namely for having plotted to betray Calais, then an English dominion, to the French. According to rumour, Anne Basset was being considered as Henry's sixth wife on the eve of Queen Catherine Howard's execution.

Katharine came to public attention at the same time that her sister was supposedly being considered as a new wife for King Henry VIII, and was arrested and briefly imprisoned on suspicion of having made treasonable utterances. Katharine is said to have gossiped that Catherine Howard's misdemeanours and execution were the actions of God showing the king that his previous marriage to Anne of Cleves was still in force.

The Letters and Papers of Henry VIII record the following examination dated 4 December 1541 of Jane Rattsey, who it appears had been provoked by Katharine Basset's relation to her of the news of Catherine Howard's misdemeanours and by her expression of praise of Anne of Cleves, into making unconsidered and impolitic replies to her:

"Jane Rattsey, examined of her words to Eliz. (sic) Bassett, viz.: "What if God worketh this work to make the lady Anne of Cleves queen again?" says it was an idle saying suggested by Bassett's praising the lady Anne and dispraising the Queen that now is. Never spoke at any other time of the lady Anne, and she thinks the King's divorce from her good. Examined why she said, "What a man is the King! How many wives will he have?" She said it upon the sudden tidings declared to her by Bassett, when she was sorry for the change and knew not so much as she knows now".

==== Attends funeral of Henry VIII ====
At the funeral of King Henry VIII in 1547 Katharine Basset received a cloth allowance for clothing as one of the household of Anne of Cleves, and her sister Anne Basset received a cloth grant also as a servant of the king.

== Marriage and progeny ==
On 8 December 1547 she married Sir Henry Ashley (1519–1588), MP, of Hever in Kent, later of St Giles, Upper Wimborne in Dorset, who was later knighted in 1553 the day after the coronation of Queen Mary I. She had the following progeny:

- Sir Henry Ashley (1548-post 1605), MP, knighted in 1603, a gentleman-pensioner to Queen Elizabeth I.

== Death ==
Basset was still alive in 1558 when mentioned in the will of her brother James Basset, but appears to have predeceased her husband, who died in 1588.
