= Anne Basset =

Lady-in-waiting

- Born: 1520
- Died: c. 1558
- Spouse: Walter Hungerford (m. 1554)
- Children: 2
- Parents: John Basset (father); Honor Grenville (mother)
- Relatives: Basset family George Basset (brother); John Basset (brother); Katharine Basset (sister); James Basset (brother); Thomas Grenville (grandfather); Robert Basset (grandson); Henry Ashley (nephew)

Anne Basset (1520 – before 1558) was an English lady-in-waiting of the Tudor period, reputed to have been the mistress of King Henry VIII.

== Biography ==
Anne was born in 1520, the fourth child of Sir John Basset and Honor Grenville (daughter of Sir Thomas Grenville of Stowe in Kilkhampton, Cornwall and his wife Isabella). As her father died when she was young, Anne was brought up by her mother and stepfather, Arthur Plantagenet, Lord Lisle, in the English enclave of Calais. Lord Lisle was the illegitimate son of King Edward IV, and thus Henry VIII's uncle.

Anne Basset to Madame de Lisle ma bonne mere a Calleys on 24 March 1536:

Thanks her for all her kindness. Begs her to send her some cloth for shirts, not so thin as she sent before; and some hose, and a little money for her devotions. I have tried to find out, as you desired, what my Lady would like. She would like some needle-cases.

While Lady Lisle drafted her reply to Anne Basset, as she was wont to do:

I send you God's blessing, and my charge to you to please my Lord and Lady, and that you keep you a good maiden. I send you money to buy smocks, because you say that which I sent you was too thin. I also send you hose cloths, because the hosier here knows not the bigness of your legs. I have sent my Lady a needle-case; but as I had no time to work it, I trust she will "take it gree," and I will send a better.

=== Court career ===
Anne's mother, had attempted to secure a place for her two daughters (Anne and her sister Katharine Basset) in the service of Queen Anne Boleyn several times, but to no avail. She persisted in her efforts to secure them positions and eventually, after sending a large consignment of quails to Anne's successor, Queen Jane Seymour, the latter relented.

She allowed Lady Lisle to send her daughters but warned her that only one position could be found. Anne was the sister accepted and was sworn into service the day after the pregnant queen took to her chamber for her lying-in. Jane Seymour seems to have objected to the French-style clothes and French hood worn by her new maid. John Husee informed Lady Lisle that Anne was required to instead wear a "bonnet and frontlet of velvet", lamenting that it "became her nothing so well as the French hood".

Anne is rumoured to have attracted Henry VIII in 1538 and 1539, and is rumoured to have been the king's mistress. The ambassadors thought that she might become his fourth wife in 1540, and again in 1542, just after Queen Katherine Howard was sentenced to death.

In August 1540, Anne Bassett and other ladies of the court visited Portsmouth to see a newly built ship. They sent Henry VIII a joint letter which was signed by Mabel, Lady Southampton, Margaret Tallebois, Margaret Howard, Alice Browne, Anne Knyvett (daughter of Thomas Knyvett), Jane Denny, Jane Meutas, Anne Bassett, Elizabeth Tyrwhitt, and Elizabeth Harvey.

Anne had served with Lady Anne Herbert as ladies to Queen Katherine Howard. Lady Herbert was sister to Henry's sixth and final queen, Katherine Parr. Anne was a maid in waiting to Queen Katherine Parr.

== Marriage ==
Anne was a maid of honour and lady of the privy chamber to Queen Mary I. In May 1554, in advance of Anne's marriage to Sir Walter Hungerford, Mary granted them lands including properties formerly possessed by the Hungerford family. On 11 June 1554, Robert Swyfte reported their wedding in a letter to Francis Talbot, 5th Earl of Shrewsbury:

"on Thursday last was married at Richmond, Basset the Queen's maid to Mr Hungerfurthe, son and heir to Lord Hungerfurthe, at which day the Queen shewed herself very pleasant, commanding all mirth and pastime"

There were two children of the marriage, who both died without issue. Anne died before 1558, when Sir Walter – with the permission of Mary – married Anne Dormer.

== References in popular culture ==
Anne Bassett is the basis of the character Nan Bassett in Kate Emerson's novel, "Secrets of the Tudor Court: Between Two Queens"., as well as E. Knight's "My Lady Viper".
