= Honor Grenville, Viscountess Lisle =

Cornish lady

Honor Grenville
- Viscountess Lisle
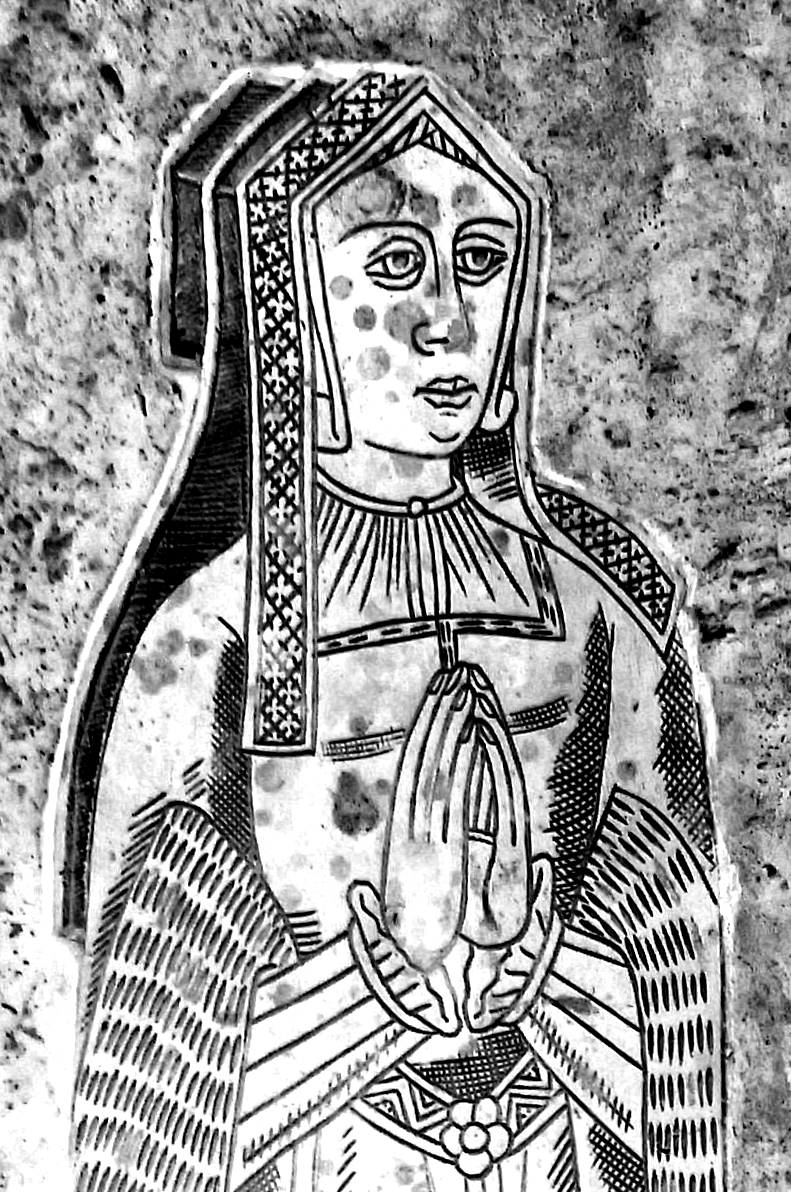
- Monumental brass of Honor Grenville on chest-tomb of her first husband (Note: The brass and its companion pieces were ordered by Honor Grenville herself, made in 1533, purchased by her lawyer and land agent George Rolle of Stevenstone before July 1534, and set onto the tomb in 1534. The Lisle Letters record that Lady Lisle ordered "images & scripture...for Mt Basset's tomb" before she departed for Calais to join her new husband Lord Lisle, and a letter from Richard Kyrton to Lady Lisle dated 21 November 1533 states: "And as for your plates for the tomb, they are sent home by the carrier, and for the gilding they must descry all the arms by the reason of colours. And they asketh £ v for the doing of it and for the making Master George Rolles hath laid out xxxiii s iiii d unto Candlemas, the which Burye then must pay him". In a letter dated April 1534 Sir John Bonde wrote to Lady Lisle "the pictures of Mr Basset's tomb" have been "laid on by the hands of Oliver Tomlyng". Thus the brasses were made in 1533 and set onto the tomb in 1534.)
- Born: c. 1493–1495
- Died: 1566 (aged 71–73); Tehidy, Cornwall
- Buried: 30 April 1566; Illogan Church
- Noble family: Grenville family
- Spouses: Sir John Basset; Arthur Plantagenet, 1st Viscount Lisle
- Issue: John Basset; George Basset; James Basset; Philippa Basset; Katharine Basset; Anne Basset; Mary Basset
- Father: Sir Thomas Grenville
- Mother: Isabella Gilbert

Arms of Grenville: Gules, three clarions or (Note: These arms are incised impaled by Basset on a monumental brass escutcheon below Honor Grenville's figure on the chest tomb in Atherington Church.)

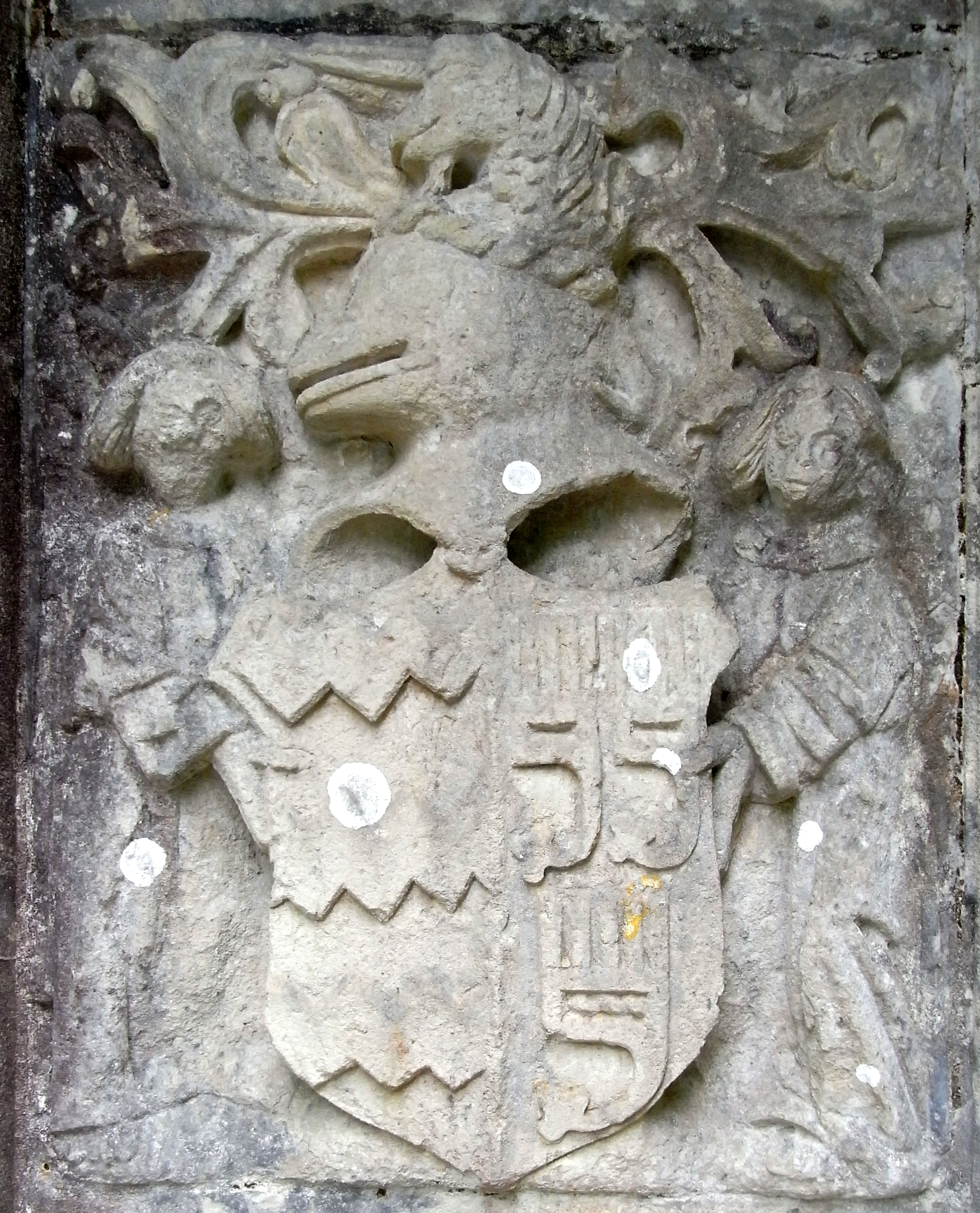
Sculptural relief showing arms of Sir John Basset (1462–1528) of Umberleigh (Barry wavy of six or and gules) impaling the arms of his wife, Honor Grenville (Gules, three clarions or) (Note: Above is the crest of Basset A unicorn's head argent. The supporters are human figures representing dexter: Sir John Basset, and sinister: Honor Grenville. Detail from the Umberleigh House Porch, formerly part of the manor house of Umberleigh, North Devon, moved to the wall of the subtropical Gardens, Watermouth Castle, North Devon.)

Honor Grenville, Viscountess Lisle (c. 1493–1495 – 1566) was a Cornish lady whose domestic life from 1533 to 1540 during the reign of King Henry VIII is exceptionally well recorded, due to the survival of the Lisle Papers in the National Archives, the state archives of the UK.

== Origins ==
Honor was a daughter of Sir Thomas Grenville (died 1513) of Stowe in the parish of Kilkhampton, Cornwall, and lord of the manor of Bideford in North Devon, by his wife Isabella Gilbert, a daughter of Otes Gilbert (1417–1492) of Compton in the parish of Marldon, Devon (whose effigy survives in Marldon Church).

== Marriages and children ==
She married twice:

- Firstly to Sir John Basset (1462–1528) of Umberleigh in the parish of Atherington in Devon. At her father's death in 1492 Honor was his only daughter by his first wife (the heiress Alicia Mules/Moels) who was still unmarried, and in his will, Sir Thomas Grenville requested: "I will that my sonne Roger shall mary my doughter Onor and to give her in marriage CCC markes in money to be levied of my lands and goods". His son Roger duly followed his father's instructions, and on 15 December 1515, he signed a deed of marriage settlement with his fellow North-Devonian, Sir John Basset of Umberleigh, for the marriage of his sister Honor, then aged about 20 or 22. Basset was a widower aged 53, and still lacking a son and heir. By John Basset she had children as follows, depicted as a row of small kneeling figures below her monumental brass in Atherington Church, Devon:
  - John Basset (1518–1541), eldest son and heir.
  - George Basset, born between 1522 and 1525;
  - James Basset (c. 1526 – 1558)
  - Philippa Basset, born 1516;
  - Katherine Basset, born 1517;
  - Anne Basset, born 1521, reputedly a mistress of King Henry VIII.
  - Mary Basset, born between 1522 and 1525;
- Secondly (as his second wife), she married Arthur Plantagenet, 1st Viscount Lisle (died 1542), later Lord deputy of Calais, an illegitimate son of King Edward IV and thus a half-brother of Queen Elizabeth of York and uncle of King Henry VIII.

== In Calais ==
Honor was one of the ladies who attended Anne Boleyn when she travelled to Calais with Henry VIII in 1532. She moved permanently to Calais with her second husband in 1533 when he was appointed Lord Deputy of Calais. They lived together at the Staple Inn in Calais until 1540, during which time she succeeded in forwarding her children's careers, much assisted by her husband's agent in England John Husee. For a New Year's Day gift in 1535, Anne Boleyn sent her a gold "pair of beads", a rosary, which she had worn herself.

Her husband was arrested in 1540 whilst on recall to England, for alleged involvement in a plot to betray Calais, Henry VIII's cherished personal possession, to the French, and was imprisoned in the Tower of London. Although no evidence was ultimately found to implicate him and in 1542 he was due for release and pardon, he died in the Tower "at the sudden rapture", having heard the good news but before regaining his freedom. During this time Honor had been under house arrest in Calais with her daughters Mary and Philippa. The contemporary chronicler Elis Gruffydd described the event of 20 May 1540 thus:

That afternoon in the twilight Lord Sussex and the Council went to the Staple Inn where Lady Lisle kept house. She, after the Council had conversed a little with her, was put in prison in a room of the palace and the girls were taken from her and put in prison in various places throughout the town.

Lady Lisle was then taken on 1 June 1540 to the house of Francis Hall a Spear of Calais, where she remained under house arrest for two years. The Lisle household was broken up on 2 June and the Treasurer of Calais took possession of all the treasure and clothes of Lord and Lady Lisle in the King's name. It was at this time and place that the surviving Lisle Papers (see below) were seized by the state. The contents of the Staple Inn were minutely catalogued on their removal, with headings for gilt plate, plate parcel gilt, white plate, gold, jewels, and with goods (i.e. furnishings) listed for every room in the house.

Rumours circulated that Honor herself was the real traitor who brought about her husband's downfall. It was said in the highly insular and Protestant fortress of Calais that she was planning to marry one of her daughters to a Catholic Frenchman, "a Picard squire", thus to an enemy of King Henry VIII, who at that time was convinced that the French were planning an assault on Calais. It was due to one of the Lisle's servants having travelled, secretly and without official permission, from Calais to Rome, to see the Pope supposedly in order to betray Calais to the French, that Lord Lisle was suspected of involvement in treason. This servant was a mischievous domestic chaplain named Gregory Botolf, like Honor of popish sympathy, nicknamed "Sir Gregory Sweet-Lips", who was said by evil rumour to be Honor's lover. Honor's daughter Mary Basset was in fact in receipt of love letters from a young French aristocrat, Gabriel de Montmorency, Seigneur de Bours, who had proposed marriage to her, and these she disposed of in the cess-pit. When they were found by Lord Sussex they added further to evidence of suspicious activity.

Her husband's arrest was a great shock to her, and John Foxe, the Protestant martyrologist, stated in his Actes and Monuments that immediately on hearing the news she "fell distraught of mind and so continued many years after". Foxe had a dislike for Honor, whom he suspected as being a determined Catholic. Elis Gruffydd, however, reported that she lost her senses whilst imprisoned in Francis Hall's house at Calais and that he never heard if she ever completely recovered them.

== Return to England ==
On 9 March 1542 the Privy Council ordered her release and this news, together with the news of her husband's release, is said by Elis Gruffydd to have reached her before the news of his death, which "was the last ironic twist of the tragic screw" (Byrne). She lived out the remaining 24 years of her life in retirement and obscurity, probably latterly at the Basset manor of Tehidy in the parish of Illogan in Cornwall, which in 1558 her grandson Arthur Basset (died 1586) conveyed to her for her life.

She died at Tehidy and was buried in Illogan Church on 30 April 1566.

== Character ==
Foxe disliked Honor, and stated of her: "The Lord Lisly albeit...himselfe of a most gentle nature, beeing fiercelie set on, and incessantlie intised by the wicked Lady Honor his wife, who was an utter enemie to God's honour, and in Idolatrie, hypocrisie and pride incomparably evill, since beeing dailie and hourelie thereunto incited and provoked by Sir Thomas Palmer Knight, and John Rookewood Esquire, too enemies to God's word, beginning nowe to flourish at Calice".

== Lisle Letters ==
Honor is notable for her surviving letters describing 16th-century court life, published as the Lisle Letters. These letters show her forceful personality and the influence she had over her husband, which was such that Thomas Cromwell himself felt obliged to write tactfully to Viscount Lisle pointing out that in matters of state a crown official could not simply do what his wife told him to. They also give insights into the administration of the manor of Umberleigh, and the negotiations with the Court of Augmentations, which led to the purchase by the Lisles of the former lands of the dissolved Frithelstock Priory.

== Sources ==
- Byrne, Muriel St. Clare (ed.), The Lisle Letters, 6 vols, University of Chicago Press, Chicago & London, 1981
- David Grummitt, Plantagenet, Arthur, Viscount Lisle (b. before 1472, d. 1542), Oxford Dictionary of National Biography, Oxford University Press, September 2004; online edn, January 2008 accessed 29 October 2009
