= Arthur Plantagenet, 1st Viscount Lisle =

Illegitimate son of King Edward IV of England

Arthur Plantagenet
- Viscount Lisle
- Arthur Plantagenet at a Garter Ceremony c. 1534. From the Black Book of the Garter, 1534
- Born: c. 1461–1475; Calais, France
- Died: 3 March 1542 (aged 66-81); Tower of London, London, England
- Buried: Church of St Peter ad Vincula, Tower of London, London, England
- Noble family: York
- Spouses: Elizabeth Grey, 6th Baroness Lisle; Honor Grenville
- Issue Detail: Frances Plantaganet; Elizabeth Plantagenet; Bridget Plantagenet
- Father: Edward IV of England
- Mother: Elizabeth Lucy

Arthur Plantagenet, 1st Viscount Lisle, KG (died 3 March 1542) was an illegitimate son of the English king Edward IV, half-brother-in-law of Henry VII, and an uncle of Henry VIII, at whose court he was a prominent figure and by whom he was appointed Lord Deputy of Calais (1533–40). The survival of a large collection of his correspondence in the Lisle Letters makes his life one of the best documented of his era.

== Biography ==
Arthur Plantagenet was born between 1461 and 1475 in Calais, which was then an English possession in France. He died at the Tower of London, where he is buried. The identity of his mother is uncertain; the most likely candidate appears to be the "wanton wench" Elizabeth Wayte, although the historical record is spotty on this issue, and it is not entirely clear that Wayte is distinct from another of Edward's mistresses, Elizabeth Lucy. Another possible candidate is Elizabeth Shore. His godfather was William FitzAlan, 16th Earl of Arundel.

He spent his childhood at the court of his father Edward IV. How he passed his youth after his father's death in 1483 is not known. In 1501 he joined the household of his half-sister, the Queen Consort Elizabeth of York, and moved to the household of Henry VII after her death in 1503. After the accession of his nephew Henry VIII in 1509, he was formally designated an Esquire of the King's Bodyguard and was a close companion of Henry's (despite the age difference).

In 1514 he was appointed High Sheriff of Hampshire and made captain of the Vice-Admiral's ship Trinity Sovereign, rising to become Vice-Admiral of England. In 1519 he and his wife, Elizabeth Grey Baroness Lisle, took possession of the lands that had belonged to her father (her brother and niece having both died). In 1520, he attended his nephew, King Henry VIII, at the Field of Cloth of Gold.

On 25 April 1523, Arthur Plantagenet was created Viscount Lisle. In 1524, he was invested as Knight of the Garter. He was also selected Privy Councilor, Governor of Calais, and Lord Warden of the Cinque Ports and named as Constable of Calais after the death of John Bourchier, 2nd Baron Berners on 16 March 1533.

== Constable of Calais ==
The Lisle Letters suggest that as Constable of Calais he was honest and conscientious but not especially competent. Among the letters is one from Thomas Cromwell rebuking him for referring trivial matters back to the king and Council, criticising him for his inability to refuse a favour to anyone who asks for one, and hinting that Lady Lisle's dominant influence over him has made him something of a laughing stock.

Yet the Crown itself did not hesitate to employ him on routine errands: in 1537 queen consort Jane Seymour during her pregnancy developed a passion for quail, and since quail were abundant in the marshes around Calais, Lisle had to devote much time to supplying them to the Queen.

== Imprisonment and death ==
In 1540, several members of the Plantagenet household in Calais were arrested on suspicion of treason, on the charge of plotting to betray the town to the French. Suspicion unavoidably fell upon Arthur as well, and he was recalled to England and eventually arrested on 19 May 1540.

The actual conspirators were executed, but there was no evidence connecting Arthur with the plot. Nevertheless, he languished in the Tower of London for two years until the king decided to release him. However, upon receiving news that he was to be released he suffered a heart attack and died two days later. The 18th-century historian Francis Sanford commented "Henry VIII's Mercy was as fatal as his Judgments".

== Lisle Letters ==
During his time in Calais, Arthur and his wife had to manage much of their affairs outside Calais by correspondence. Copies of 3,000 of these letters were seized as evidence after Arthur was arrested. They survive in the Public Record Office, and were published in abridged form as the Lisle Letters, becoming a valuable historical resource for a critical period in English history.

== Marriages and children ==
Arthur Plantagenet married twice, producing children by his first wife only.

His first marriage was on 12 November 1511 to Elizabeth Grey (died 1529), daughter of Edward Grey, 1st Viscount Lisle (died 1492). She was the widow of Edmund Dudley, treasurer to King Henry VII, who had been executed in 1510 by Henry VIII. The next day the king granted Arthur some of the Dudley estates which had come to the crown due to Dudley's attainder. By Elizabeth he had three daughters:

- Frances, who married twice: firstly to her step-brother John Basset (1520–1541) of Umberleigh, Devon, the son of Arthur's second wife by her first marriage, Honor Grenville (died 1566); secondly Frances married Thomas Monke (c. 1515 – c. 1583) of Potheridge, Devon, of an ancient Devonshire family. Her great-grandson by this marriage was George Monck, 1st Duke of Albemarle (1608–1670).
- Elizabeth, who married Sir Francis Jobson, Member of Parliament for Colchester
- Bridget, who married William Carden [Cawarden]

Secondly, in 1529 as her second husband, he married Honor Grenville (1493–1566) the daughter of Sir Thomas Grenville (died 1513) of Stowe in the parish of Kilkhampton, Cornwall, by his wife Isabella Gilbert. She was the widow of Sir John Bassett (1462–1528) of Umberleigh, Devon. Arthur had no children by Honor, but he helped to bring up her children, including John Basset, who became the husband of his daughter Frances from his first marriage; Anne Bassett, an alleged mistress of Henry VIII, and Elizabeth Bassett, a royal maid-of-honour also known as Mary Bassett.

== Arms ==
Before his first marriage, Arthur Plantagenet bore his paternal arms, with baton sinister azure for bastardy, of Edward, 4th Duke of York (later King Edward IV): Quarterly 1st: Arms of King Edward III; 2nd & 3rd: Or a cross gules (de Burgh), 4th: Barry or and azure, on a chief of the first two pallets between two base esquires of the second over all an inescutcheon argent (Mortimer). The arms of Edward, 4th Duke of York, emphasise his descent from Lionel of Antwerp, 1st Duke of Clarence (1338–1368), third son of King Edward III (on which basis the House of York claimed the throne), who married Elizabeth de Burgh, 4th Countess of Ulster (1332–1363). Their daughter Philippa de Burgh married Edmund Mortimer, 3rd Earl of March, whose son Roger de Mortimer, 4th Earl of March, was the great-grandfather of Edward, 4th Duke of York.

After his first marriage, Arthur Plantagenet added an inescutcheon of pretence of Grey, Viscounts Lisle, quarterly of six, 1st: Barry of six argent and azure in chief three torteaux (Grey, Viscount Lisle); 2nd: Barry of argent and azure, an orle of martlets gules (Valence, Earl of Pembroke); 3rd: Gules, seven mascles or conjoined 3, 3, 1 (Ferrers of Groby); 4th: Gules, a lion rampant within a bordure engrailed or (Talbot); 5th: Gules, a fesse between six crosses crosslet or (Beauchamp); 6th: Gules, a lion statant guardant argent crowned or (Lisle); in chief a label of three points argent.

He bore as crest: On a cap of maintenance gules turned up ermine, and inscribed in front with the letter A, a genet guardant per pale sable and argent, standing between two broom-stalks proper. The broom plant (Planta genista) inspired the naming of the Plantagenet dynasty and the genet alluded to it.

Arms before his first marriage (1511)

Arms after his first marriage (1511)

Coat of arms with the genet and Planta genista crest

== Sources ==
- Commire, Anne; Klezmer, Deborah (1999). Women in world history: a biographical encyclopedia. Vol. 6 (illustrated ed.). Yorkin Publications. ISBN 978-0-7876-3736-1.
- St. Clare Byrne, Muriel, ed. (1983). The Lisle Letters: An Abridgement. University of Chicago Press. ISBN 0-226-08800-6.
- "Arthur Plantagenet (1 V. Lisle)".
- Vivian, Lt.Col. J.L., (Ed.) The Visitations of the County of Devon: Comprising the Heralds' Visitations of 1531, 1564 & 1620, Exeter, 1895.

Political offices
Preceded by Sir Thomas Cheney	Lord Warden of the Cinque Ports; 1539–1542	Succeeded by Sir Thomas Seymour
