= Mistresses of Henry VIII =

Romantic and sexual partners of Henry VIII

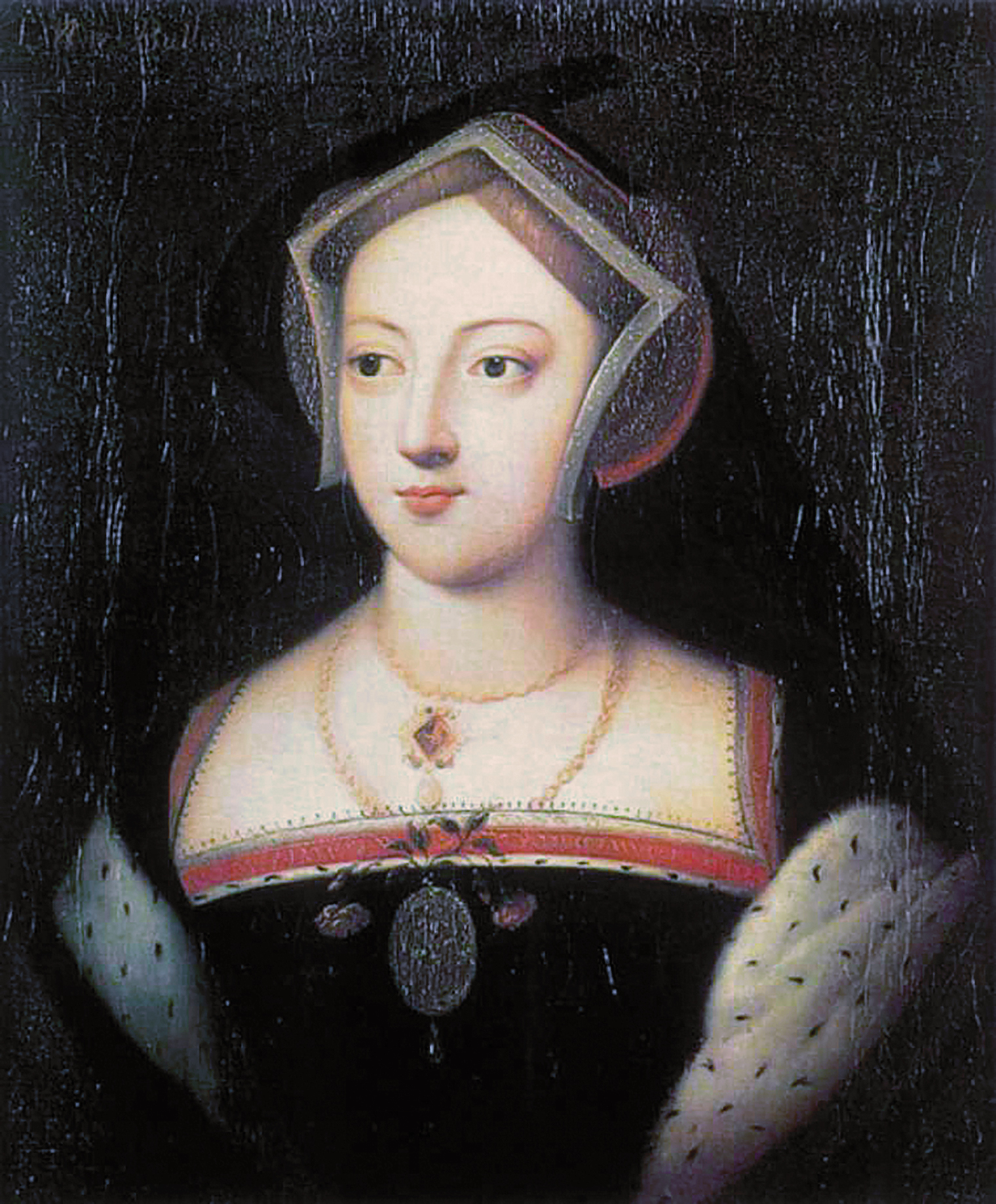
Portrait of Mary Boleyn, one of Henry VIII's mistresses. She was known to be very beautiful by both the English and French courts.

The mistresses of Henry VIII included many notable women between 1509 and 1536. They have been the subject of biographies, novels and films.

== Confirmed mistresses ==
- Elizabeth or Bessie Blount, mother of his illegitimate son, Henry FitzRoy, to whom Henry VIII gave the dukedoms of Somerset and Richmond. FitzRoy, which means son of the king, was acknowledged by Henry and there was talk in the 1530s that the King, who then had no male heir, would legitimise FitzRoy.
- Mary Boleyn, sister of Anne Boleyn. It was rumoured that one or both of Mary's children were fathered by the King, although no evidence exists to support the argument that either of them was the King's biological child. Mary is often considered to be Henry's favourite mistress.
- Margaret "Madge" Shelton, first cousin of Anne Boleyn. According to Imperial ambassador Eustace Chapuys, the King had an affair with 'Mistress Shelton' in February 1535, for around six months.
- In 1534, a woman named "The Imperial Lady" became mistress to Henry VIII, using her influence to secure better treatment for Catherine of Aragon and Princess Mary.

In addition, Henry VIII was involved in a romantic relationship with three of his future wives before he married them. It is unclear if these relationships became sexual before marriage. He was involved with his second wife, Anne Boleyn, from around 1526, around the time he ended his relationship with her sister, Mary; Anne was also, at the time, maid-of-honour to his first wife, Catherine of Aragon. Anne was referred to by some as "the king's whore" or a "naughty paike [prostitute]". Henry and Anne's daughter, Elizabeth I, was born (7 September 1533) almost eight months on from their marriage (25 January 1533).

From the beginning of 1536, while still married to Anne Boleyn, he was openly courting his wife's second cousin and maid-of-honour, Jane Seymour. It appears that his lust for mistresses did not abate as he reached middle age; in 1540, he began courting Catherine Howard, the maid-of-honour of his fourth spouse, Anne of Cleves. Catherine was a first cousin of Anne and Mary Boleyn.

== Alleged mistresses ==
- Jane Popincourt, a Frenchwoman, who was a tutor to his sisters.
- Anne Bassett, stepdaughter of the King's uncle, Arthur Plantagenet, 1st Viscount Lisle, lady-in-waiting to Jane Seymour, Anne of Cleves, Catherine Howard and Queen Mary I.
- Elizabeth Carew, wife of his close friend, Nicholas Carew, and half-first cousin of Anne Boleyn.
- Anne Hastings, Countess of Huntingdon, née Stafford, sister of Edward Stafford, 3rd Duke of Buckingham and thus the first cousin once removed of Henry VIII.
- Elizabeth Amadas
- Mary Shelton
- Elizabeth Browne - Countess of Worcester - possibly confused with another female member of the Browne family, as there is no record that the countess was the king's mistress.
- Katherine Willoughby
- Joanna Dyngley, a royal laundress. Alleged mother of Ethelreda Malte
- Mary Berkeley, whose son John Perrot was rumoured to be Henry's illegitimate child

== Research ==
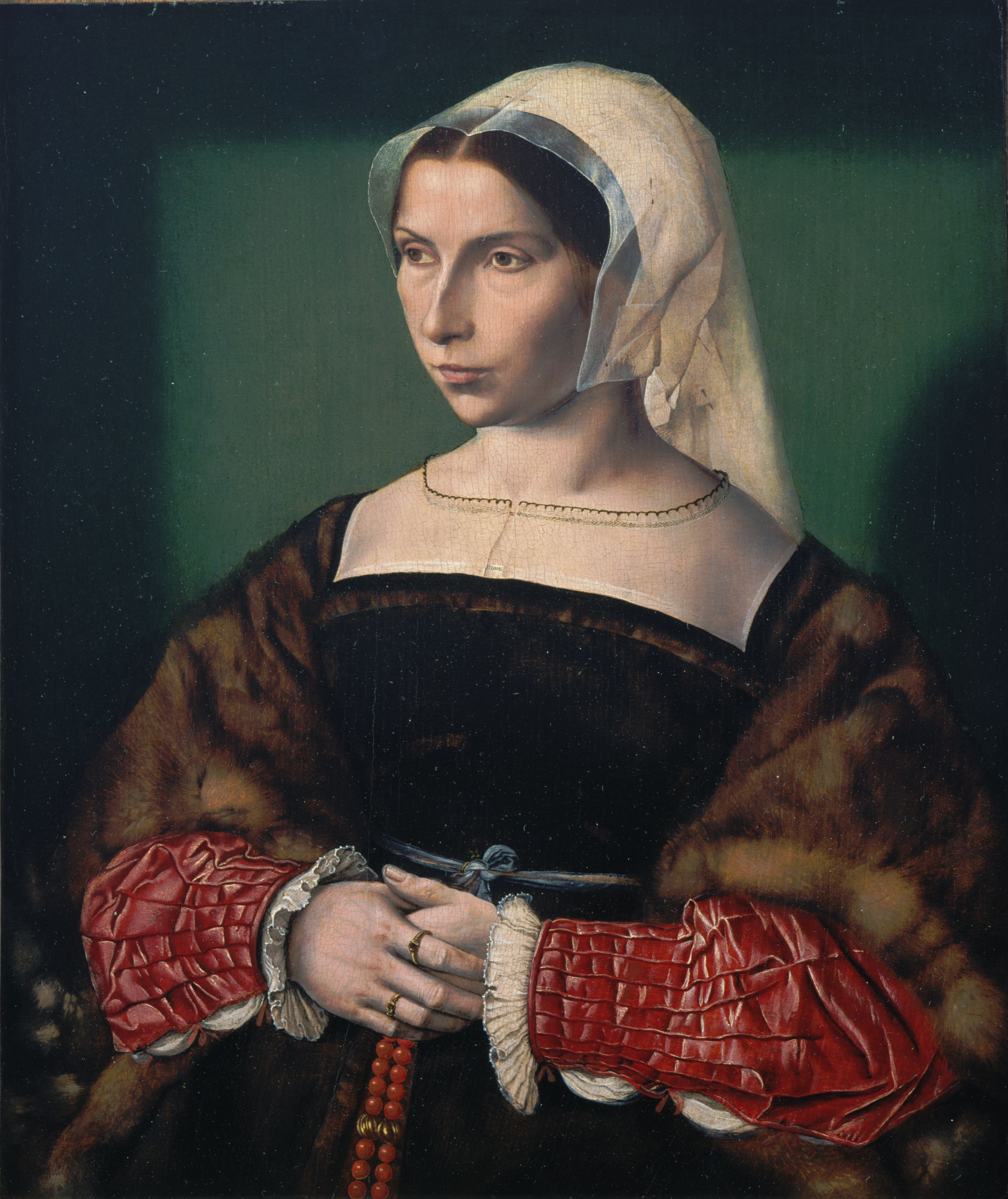
Portrait of Anne Hastings. She is often considered to be one of Henry's mistresses.

Kelly Hart's study The Mistresses of Henry VIII was published in 2009. In 2010, Mary Boleyn: The True Story of Henry VIII's Favourite Mistress by Josephine Wilkinson was published, and in 2012, Alison Weir published Mary Boleyn: The Great and Infamous Whore. In 2013, this was followed by Bessie Blount: Mistress to Henry VIII by Elizabeth Norton.

== Portrayals in media ==
On Elizabeth Blount

- The Tudors, a 2007 TV series, portrayed by Ruta Gedmintas
- The Spanish Princess (2020), portrayed by Chloe Harris

On Mary Boleyn

- The Other Boleyn Girl, book by Philippa Gregory, and film based on the book
- The Last Boleyn, novel by Karen Harper (2006)
- Mistress Boleyn – a Novel about Mary Boleyn by Charlotte St. George (2012)
- The Tudors, a 2007 TV series, portrayed by Perdita Weeks
- Wolf Hall, a 2015 BBC TV series based on the 2009 novel of the same name by Hilary Mantel, portrayed by Charity Wakefield.

On Jane Popincourt

- The Pleasure Palace (Secrets of the Tudor Court) by Kate Emerson

On Mary Shelton

- Major character in The Lady in the Tower by Jean Plaidy (1986)

On Anne Hastings

- Minor character in The Tudors (2007)
- Minor character in The Spanish Princess (2020)

On Anne Bassett

- Minor character in The Boleyn Inheritance by Philippa Gregory (2006)

== See also ==
- Wives of Henry VIII
- Children of Henry VIII
