= Thomas Grenville (died 1513) =

Sheriff of Cornwall

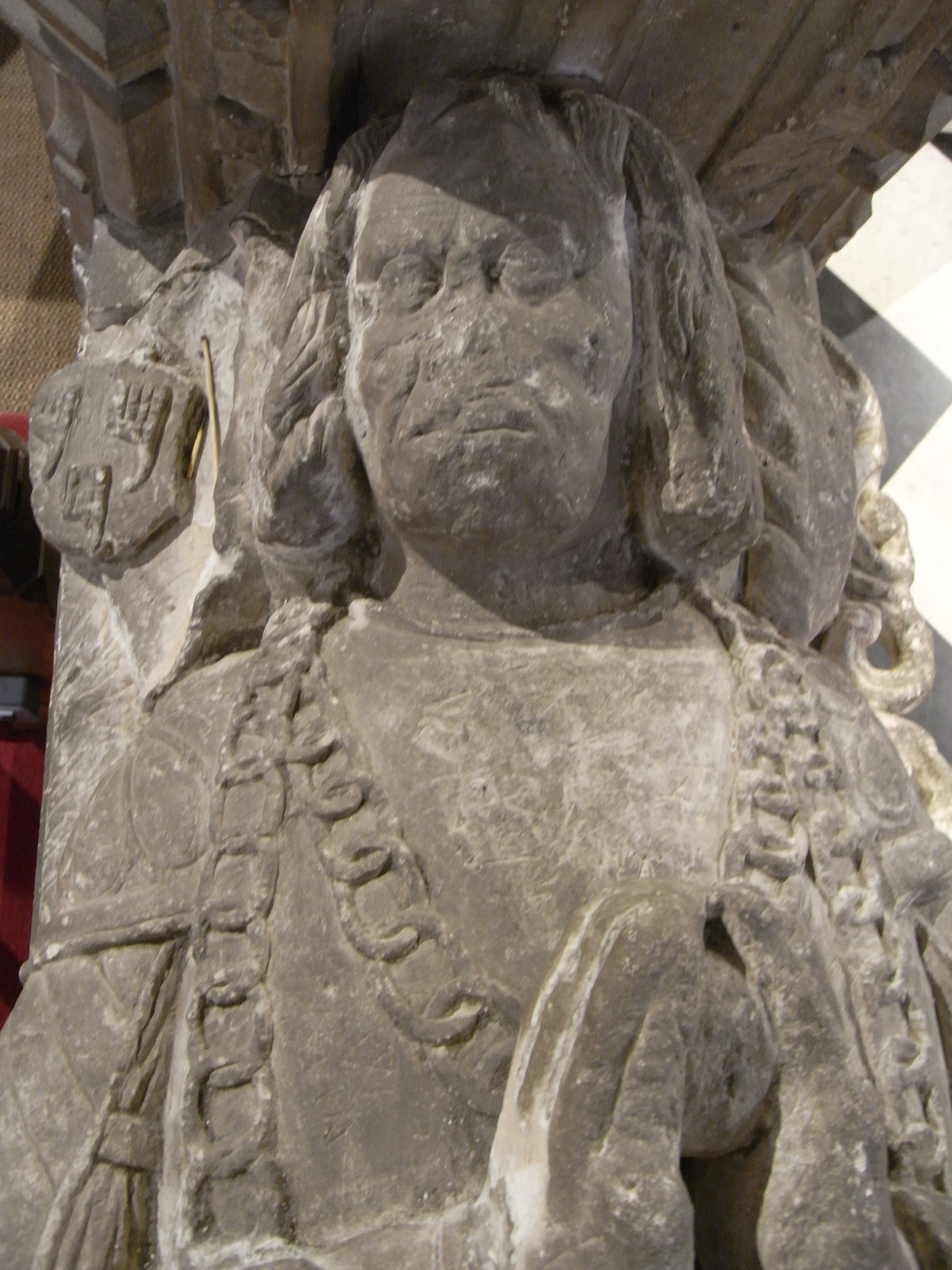
Detail of Grenville's effigy in St Mary's Church, Bideford

Sir Thomas Grenville II, K.B., (c. 1453 – c. 1513), lord of the manors of Stowe in Kilkhampton, Cornwall and Bideford, Devon, Sheriff of Cornwall in 1481 and 1486. During the Wars of the Roses, he was a Lancastrian supporter who had taken part in the conspiracy against Richard III, organised by the Duke of Buckingham. On the accession of King Henry VII (1485–1509) to the throne, Sir Thomas was appointed one of the Esquires of the Body to Henry VII. On 14 November 1501 upon the marriage of Prince Arthur to Katherine of Aragon, he was created a Knight of the Bath. He served on the Commission of the Peace for Devon from 1510 to his death in circa 1513.

== Origins ==
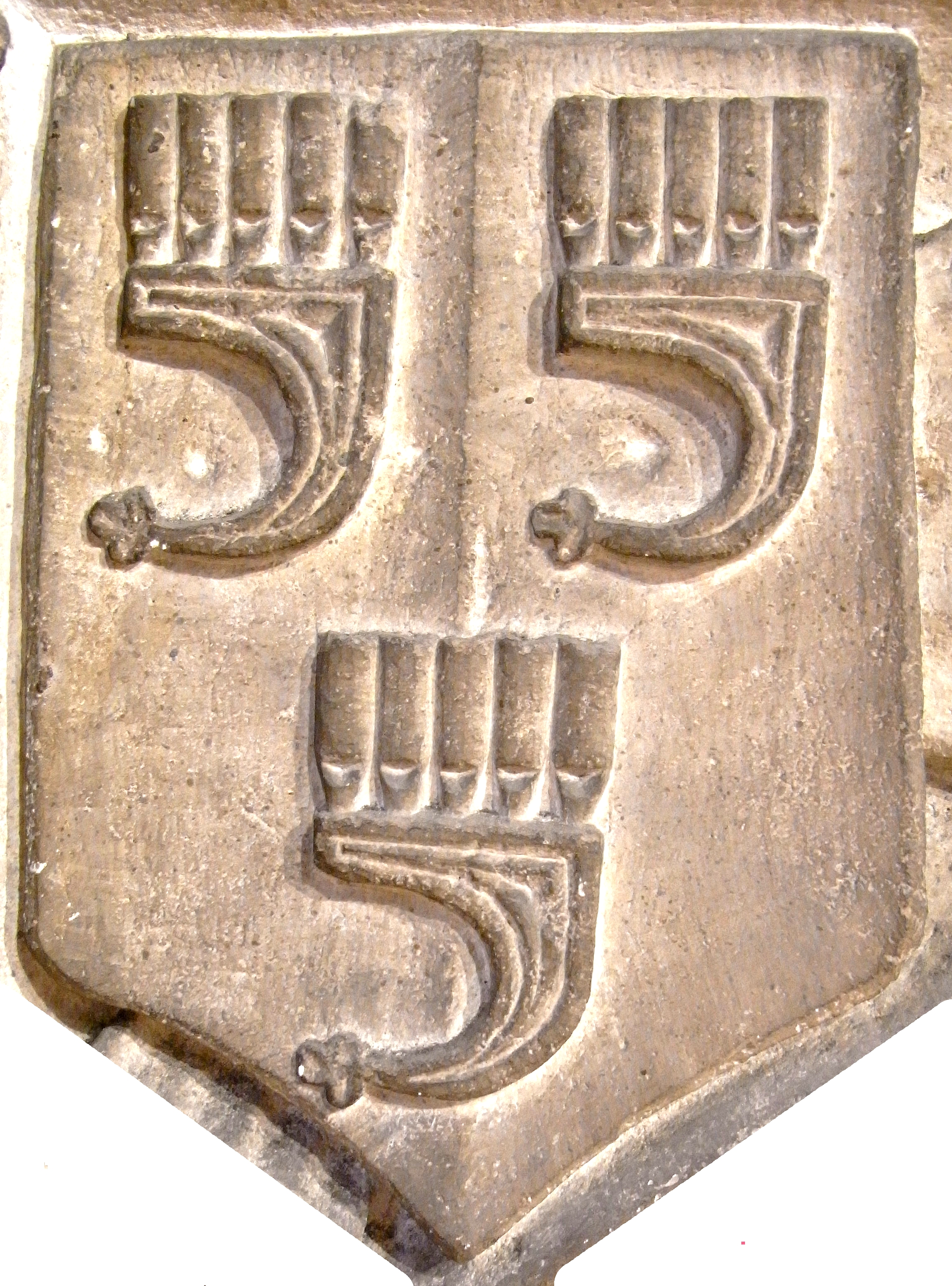
Left: Arms of Grenville: Gules, three clarions or; and right as sculpted on his monument in St Mary's Church, Bideford

He was the son and heir of Sir Thomas Grenville I (born by 21 January 1432 - died c. 1483), by his second wife Elizabeth Gorges, daughter of Sir Theobald Gorges, K.B., lord of Wraxall, Somerset, and Braunton Gorges, co. Devon by his wife, Jane Hankford.

== Marriages and children ==
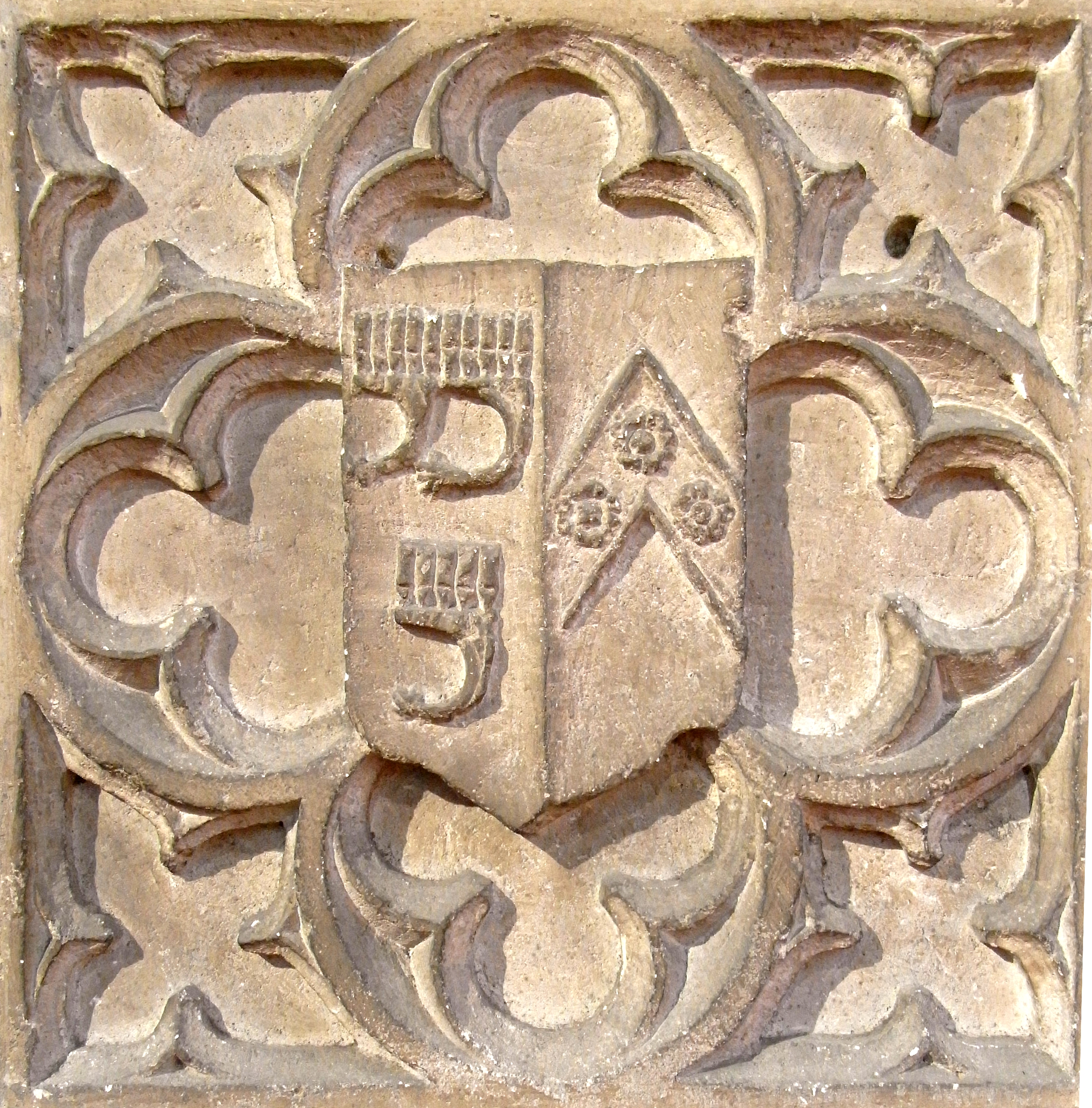
Heraldic escutcheon within quatrefoil on Grenville's monument in St Mary's Church, Bideford. Arms displayed are: Gules, three clarions or (Grenville) impaling Or, on a chevron sable three roses of the field (Gilbert)

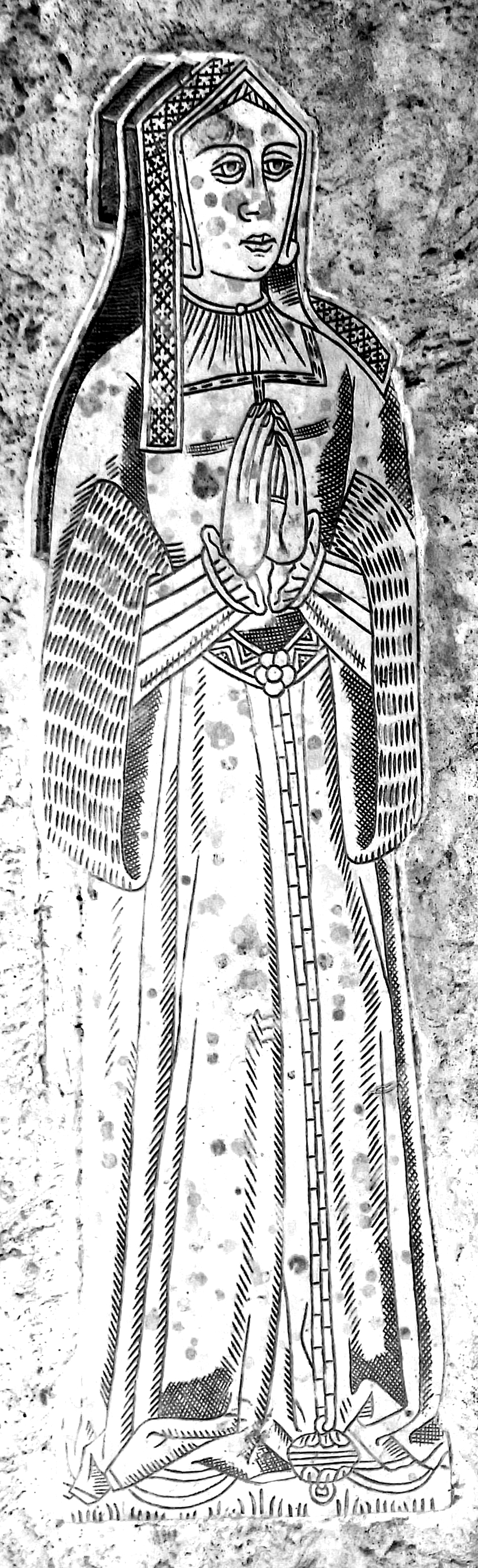
Monumental brasses of two of Grenville's daughters. Left: Honor Grenville, on chest-tomb of her first husband Sir John Bassett (1462–1529) of Umberleigh. Atherington Church, Devon. Right: Katherine Grenville, on monument to her husband Sir John Arundell (1474–1545) of Lanherne. Church of St Columb Major, Cornwall

Grenville married twice. His first wife was Isabel Gilbert, daughter of Sir Otes Gilbert of Compton Castle by his wife Elizabeth Hill, daughter of Robert Hill, Esq., of Shilston. By Isabel Gilbert, Grenville had two sons and six daughters:

- Sir Roger Grenville (1477–1523), eldest son and heir, Sheriff of Cornwall in 1510–11, 1517–18, 1522, who was present within the Cornish contingent at the Field of the Cloth of Gold. He married Margaret Whitleigh, the daughter and co-heiress of Richard Whitleigh (died 1509), of Efford in Eggbuckland His sons (all of whom have left surviving letters in the Lisle Papers) were:
  - Sir Richard Grenville (c. 1495 – 1550), eldest son and heir. Entered the Inner Temple, with his brother John, in 1520; MP for Cornwall in 1529. He married Matilda Bevil, daughter and co-heiress of John Bevil of Gwarnock, St Allen, Cornwall. He was pre-deceased by his eldest son Roger Grenville (died 1545), captain of the Mary Rose when it sank in Portsmouth Harbour in 1545, whose son was the heroic Admiral Sir Richard Grenville (1542–1591), Captain of the Revenge, MP for Cornwall, Sheriff of Cork from 1569 to 1570, Sheriff of Cornwall in 1576–77, Armed Merchant Fleet Owner, privateer, coloniser, and explorer.
  - John Grenville (c. 1506 – c. 1562), second son. Entered the Inner Temple, with his brother Richard, in 1520. three times MP for Exeter, in 1545, 1554 and 1558. In 1534 he purchased the reversion of the office of a Serjeant-at-Arms, which office he performed for King Henry VIII from 1535. He was a servant successively of Sir Thomas More and Lord Chancellor Thomas Audley. He married Lettice Lucas, daughter of Thomas Lucas of Suffolk.
  - Diggory Grenville, third son, some of whose correspondence, in connection with his management of his aunt Honor Grenville's manor of Umberleigh, survives in the Lisle Papers.
- Richard Grenville, Admiral.
- Jane Grenville, married Sir John Arundell (1470–1512) of Trerice in Cornwall, Sheriff of Cornwall and Vice Admiral of the West to King Henry VII and to his son King Henry VIII. An escutcheon showing the arms of Arundell impaling Grenville survives on the monumental brass in Stratton Church, Cornwall, of her son Sir John Arundell (1495–1561), of Trerice, known as Jack of Tilbury, an Esquire of the Body to King Henry VIII and Vice-Admiral of the West.
- Mary Grenville, married firstly Richard Bluett (1479 – c. 1523) of Holcombe Rogus in Devon and Cothay Manor, which he rebuilt, in Somerset. His monumental brass exists in St Nicholas' Church in Kittisford, Somerset; secondly to Thomas St Aubyn.
- Agnes Grenville, married John Roscarrock of Roscarrock near Port Isaac.
- Philippa Grenville (died 1524), married firstly Francis Harris (1475–1509) of Radford, Devon; secondly Humphry Arundell of Lanherne, Cornwall, younger brother of Sir John Arundell (1474–1545), her brother-in-law.
- Honor Grenville (died 1566), married firstly Sir John Bassett (1462–1528) of Umberleigh in Devon; secondly Arthur Plantagenet, 1st Viscount Lisle, an illegitimate son of King Edward IV. Much is known about her life from her surviving correspondence in the Lisle Letters.
- Katherine Grenville, youngest daughter, married in 1507 Sir John Arundell (1474–1545) of Lanherne, Receiver General of the Duchy of Cornwall and "the most important man in the county".

Grenville's second wife was the widow of a certain "Hill de Taunton". By her he had two further children: John, who was appointed by his father rector of Kilkhampton in 1524, in which office he remained until 1580; and Jane.

== Residences ==
Bideford was the residence of the Grenville family from shortly after the Norman Conquest and Stowe in Cornwall was also a seat. Grenville's descendants made Stowe their chief seat, whilst retaining ownership of Bideford until the family died out in the senior male line.

== Monument in Bideford ==
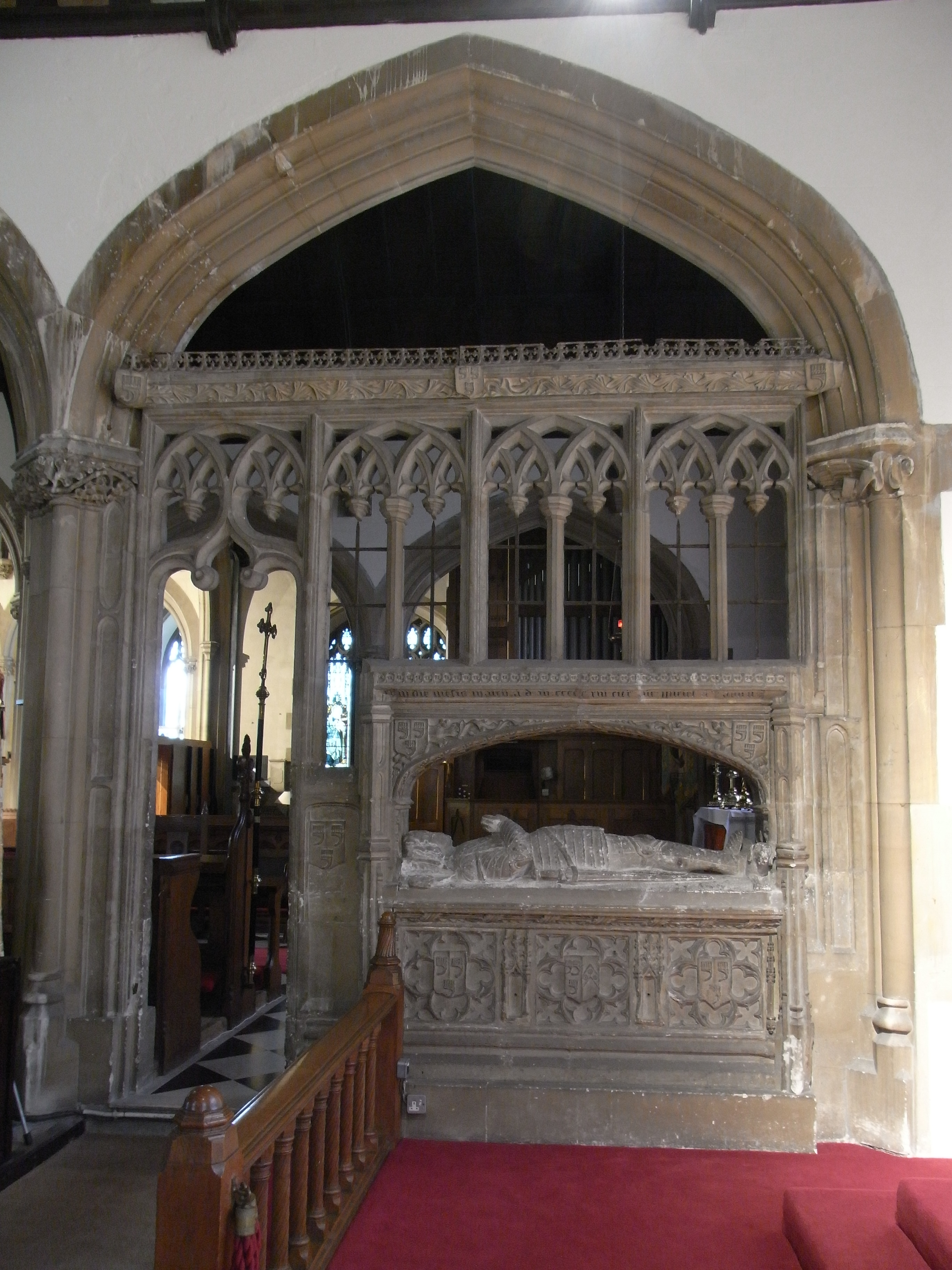
Grenville's monument in St Mary's Church, Bideford, from the Lady Chapel looking northwards

A monument with recumbent effigy on a chest tomb exists of Sir Thomas Grenville in the Church of St Mary, Bideford. Inscribed on the Tudor arch above is the following Latin text:

Hic jacet Thomas Graynfyld miles patron(us) (huius) eccle(siae) q(ui) obiit XVIII die me(n)sis Marcii A(nno) D(omini) MCCCCCXIII cui(us) a(n)i(ma)e p(ro)piciet(ur) D(eus) Amen ("Here lies Thomas Grenville, knight, patron of this church who died on the 18th day of March in the Year of Our Lord 1513, to whose soul may God look on with favour Amen")

His recumbent effigy is shown fully armed in a suit of Almain rivets and his feet rest on a dog. His hair is of chin-length and his hands are clasped in prayer holding a ball shaped object, his heart according to Roger Granville, Rector of Bideford and the family's historian, who described the monument in detail in 1895.

There are several heraldic escutcheons on the monument displaying the arms of Grenville: Gules, three clarions or. The monument is an important early source for use in deciphering the form of these mysterious and unexplained charges that are still borne by distant relatives, Baron Grenfell, and are borne in the 3rd quarter by Earl Granville.

== Bibliography ==
- Byrne, Muriel St. Clare, (ed.) The Lisle Letters, 6 vols, University of Chicago Press, Chicago & London, 1981, esp. vol.1, pp. 299–351, "Grenvilles and Bassets"
