= Tehidy Country Park =

Country park in Illogan in Cornwall, England

Coordinates: 50.242°N 5.305°W

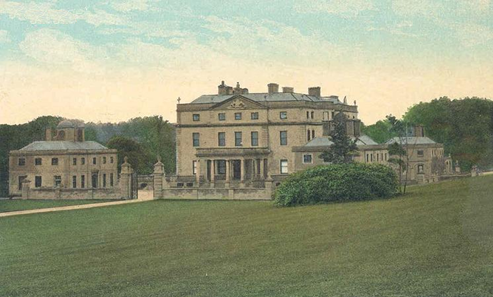
Tehidy House, Illogan, near Camborne, Cornwall, depicted circa 1900. This is the neo-classical house re-built 1861–63 by John Francis Basset (1831–1869).

Tehidy Country Park is a country park in Illogan in Cornwall, England which incorporates 250 acres (1.0 km^{2}) of the parkland and estate around Tehidy House, a former manor house of the Tehidy manor. The park's facilities include an events field, barbecue hire facilities in a specially designated woodland, outdoor education facilities, a permanent orienteering course and a schools and youth campsite. The manor was a seat for many centuries of the junior branch of the Basset family which gained much wealth from local tin mining. The estate and house were purchased by Cornwall County Council in 1983 and the country park is one of four in Cornwall.

== House ==
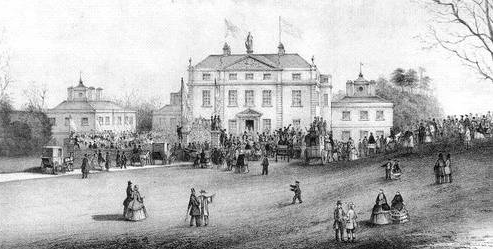
Tehidy, depiction of a public celebration circa 1800

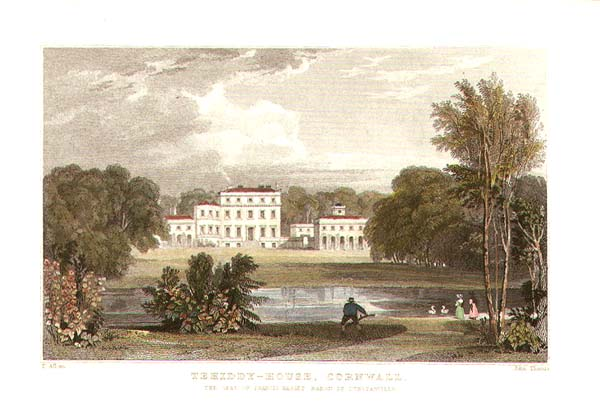
"Tehiddy House, Cornwall. The Seat of Francis Basset, Baron De Dunstanville" (1757-1835). 1832 engraving by John Thomas after T. Allom

Recorded as 'Tehidin' in the 12th & 13th centuries, its name is derived from the Cornish language 'ti', a house, and a personal name. The Basset family owned the estate from Norman times. They acquired the manor of Tehidy in the mid-12th century when William Basset married Cecilia, heiress of the House of de Dunstanville. By 1330, William Basset owned a substantial building but during the Cornish Rebellion of 1497 it was dismantled by rebels led by Richard Pendyne of Pendeen in revenge for the loyalty to the Crown shown by John Basset, then Sheriff of Cornwall.

In 1734 the building of a new mansion house was commenced by John Pendarves Basset and in 1739 Francis Basset took possession of the estate and the almost completed house. In 1861 John Francis Basset again commenced a rebuilding, funded by the income from mining and land rents. During 1860–61 his income from Dolcoath mine and the Basset mines amounted to £20,000. The house was completed by 1863. By 1888 Arthur Francis Basset had inherited the estate but because of diminished income from the mining industry it was difficult to finance the estate. In 1915 the mansion was vacated and after 700 years of Basset ownership, the estate was sold in 1916. In 1918 the house became a hospital for tuberculosis sufferers. On 23 February 1919 the house was destroyed by fire but by January 1922 had been completely rebuilt.

== Country park ==
Within the boundaries of Tehidy Country Park, evidence of man's activities can be found dating back many centuries. In the woodland in the North Cliffs area is an ancient earthwork and in Oak Wood, earth banks that were field boundaries can still be seen. The Basset family obtained the manor of Tehidy in the mid-12th century and today's landscape is the result of their activities. Many features created by the Bassets have now disappeared but some relics of the estate can still be seen.

== Flora and fauna ==
The woodland at Tehidy is composed of distinct vegetation layers. Trees such as Ash, Alder, Oak, Beech, Sycamore, Birch, Japanese Maple, Conifers and Chestnut are the tallest, most dominating trees, followed by lower growing shrubs including Holly and Hazel. Typical woodland plants such as Bluebells, Wild Garlic (Allium triquetrum), Daffodils and a range of native ferns inhabit the park as well as many different varieties of Rhododendron. The park is home to, amongst others, swans, geese, rooks, jackdaws, coots, moor hens, grey squirrels, otters and badgers.

== Hospital ==
In the centre of the park, but now private property, is a large building which was once Tehidy Hospital (sometimes referred to as Tehidy Sanatorium). It was originally converted from the Bassets' home into an isolation hospital for patients with tuberculosis, but in later years also dealt with patients who had strokes, head injuries and various respiratory disorders. Like many old TB Hospitals there were several wards distributed throughout the extensive grounds and the operating theatre was refurbished in the early 1980s although was never reopened. Over the years most of the wards closed and finally the hospital shut completely in April 1988, and has now been converted into luxury apartments. Several new luxury houses have now been built around the former hospital buildings. There is no public right of way through this section of the park.

== See also ==
- Baron Basset
- Great Cornish Families
- Basset family
- South Tehidy

== Sources ==
- Vivian, Lt.Col. J. L., (ed.) The Visitations of the County of Devon: Comprising the Heralds' Visitations of 1531, 1564 & 1620, Exeter, 1895
