= Manor of Gittisham =

Historic manor

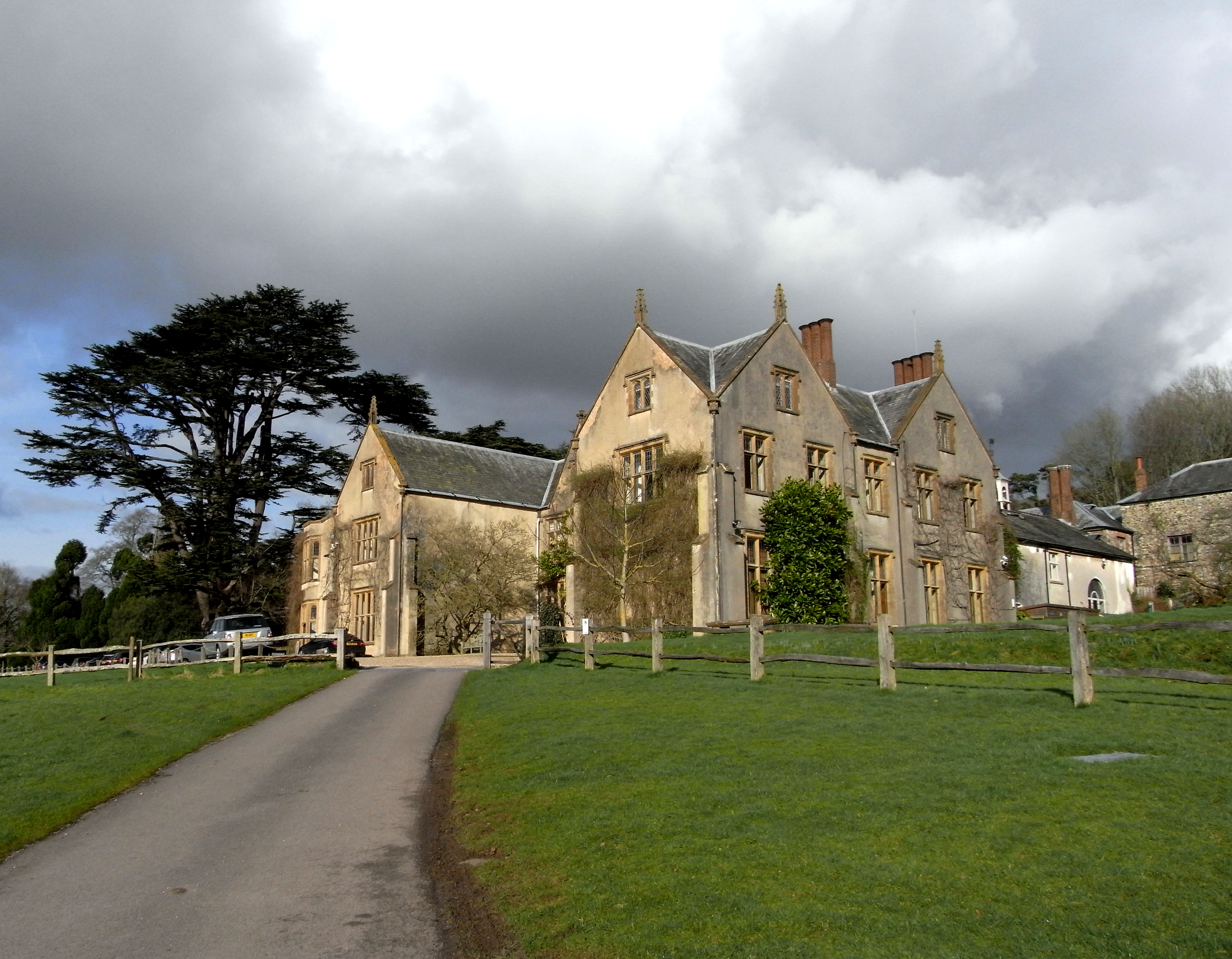
Combe House, the manor house of Gittisham, since 1968 a country house hotel. Viewed from south-west

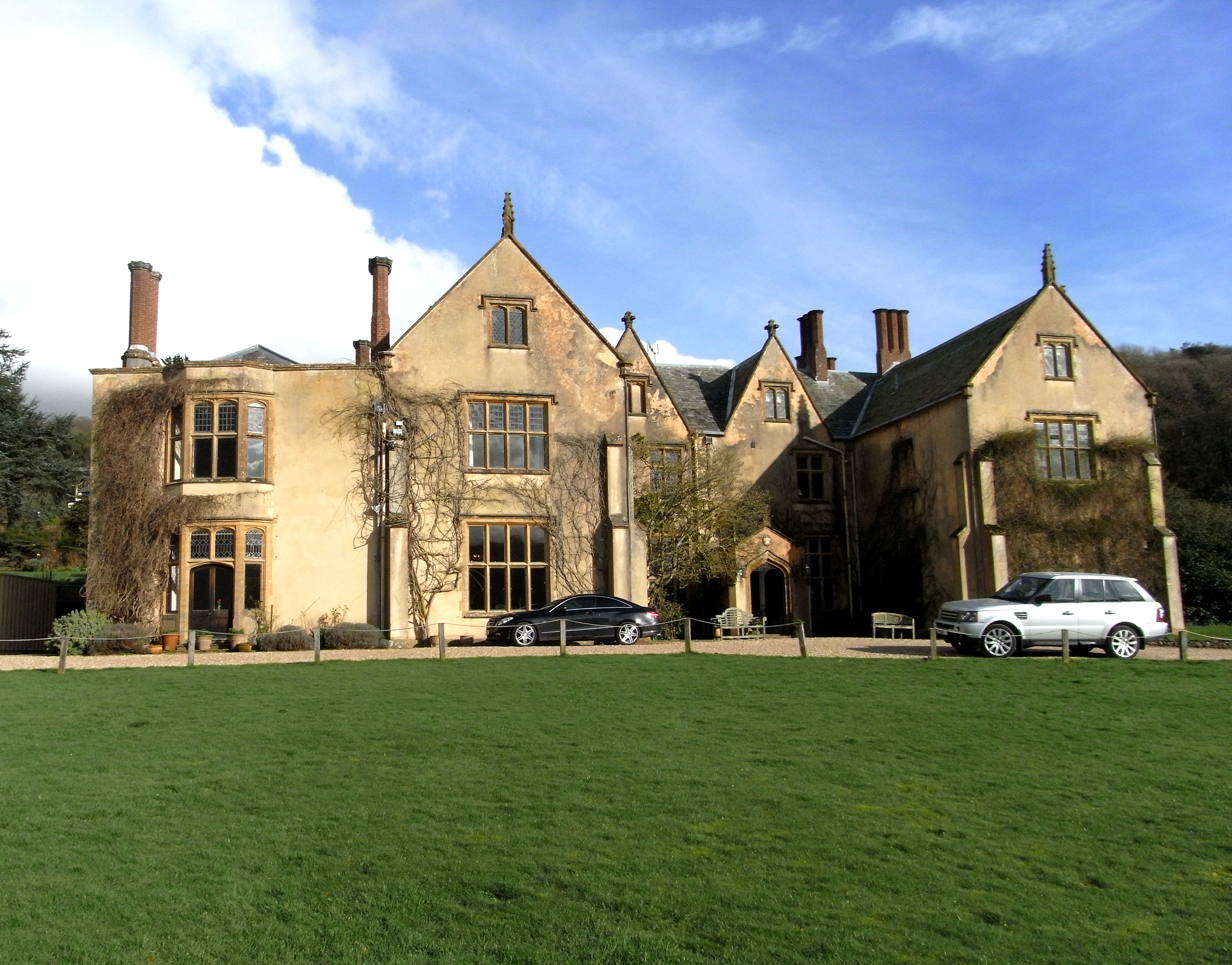
Combe House, west front

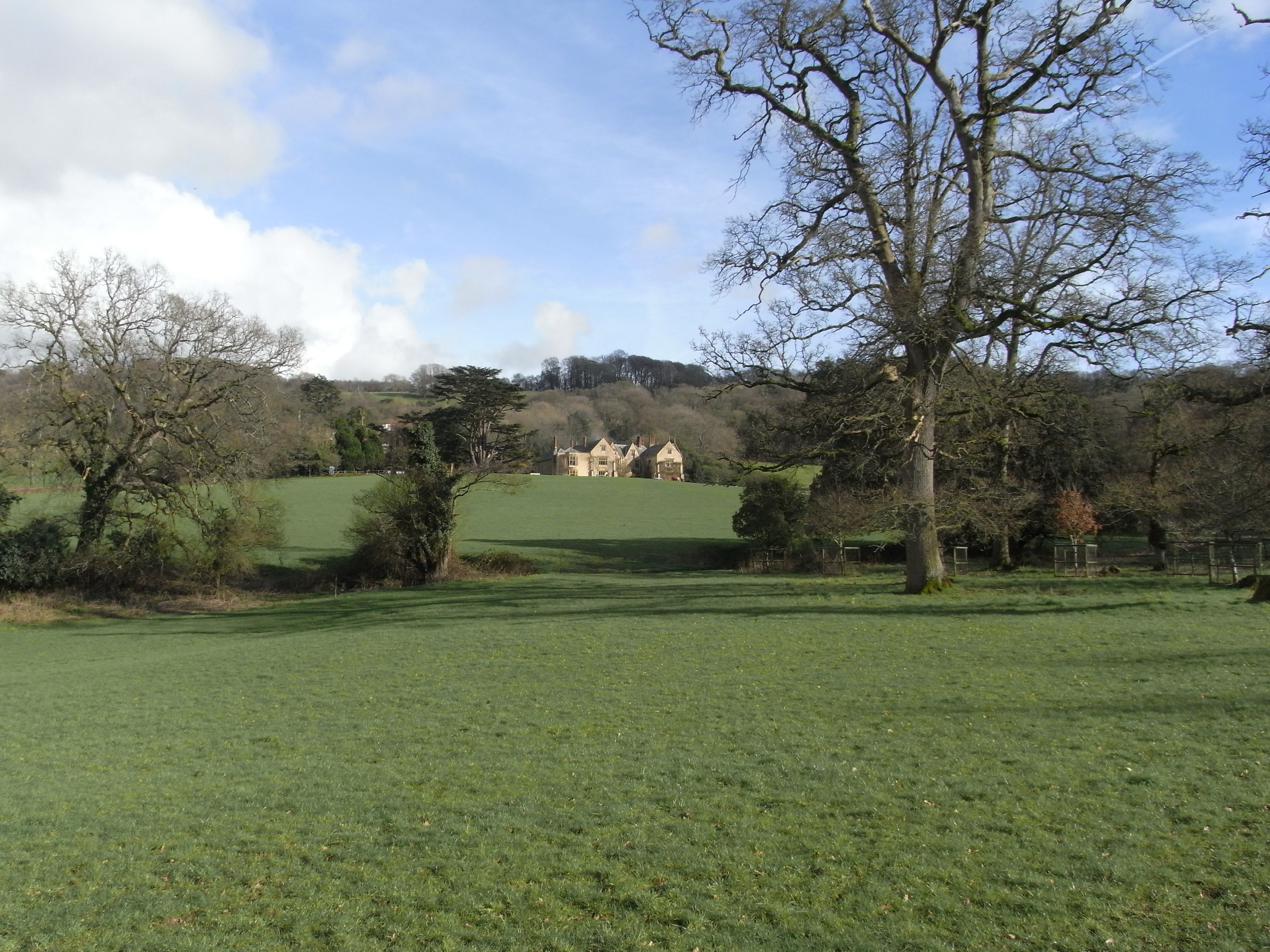
Combe House, viewed across parkland from west

Gittisham is an historic manor largely co-terminous with the parish of Gittisham in Devon, England, within which is situated the village of Gittisham. The capital estate is Combe, on which is situated Combe House, the manor house of Gittisham, a grade I listed Elizabethan building situated 2 1/4 miles south-west of the historic centre of Honiton and 3 1/4 miles north-east of the historic centre of Ottery St Mary.

== Descent ==
=== Gotshelm ===
The manor of Gidesha(m) is recorded in the Domesday Book of 1086 as the 15th of the 28 holdings of Gotshelm, held in chief of King William the Conqueror. No tenant is listed, suggesting he held it in demesne. His 17th holding was a certain Come, which however is supposed by Thorne (1985) to represent Coombe in the parish of Uplowman, not Combe in Gittisham. Gotshelm was the brother of Walter de Claville, another of the Devon Domesday Book tenants-in-chief and the lands of both brothers later formed part of the Feudal barony of Gloucester.

=== Feudal barony of Gloucester ===
==== Willington/de Lomen ====
The manor of Gittisham descended with most of Gotshelm's other holdings to the Feudal barony of Gloucester. Combe was held from the barony by the Willington family. In the Book of Fees lands in Gittisham are recorded as held from "Ralph de Wylingthon" by "Richard de Lumene".

=== Willington ===
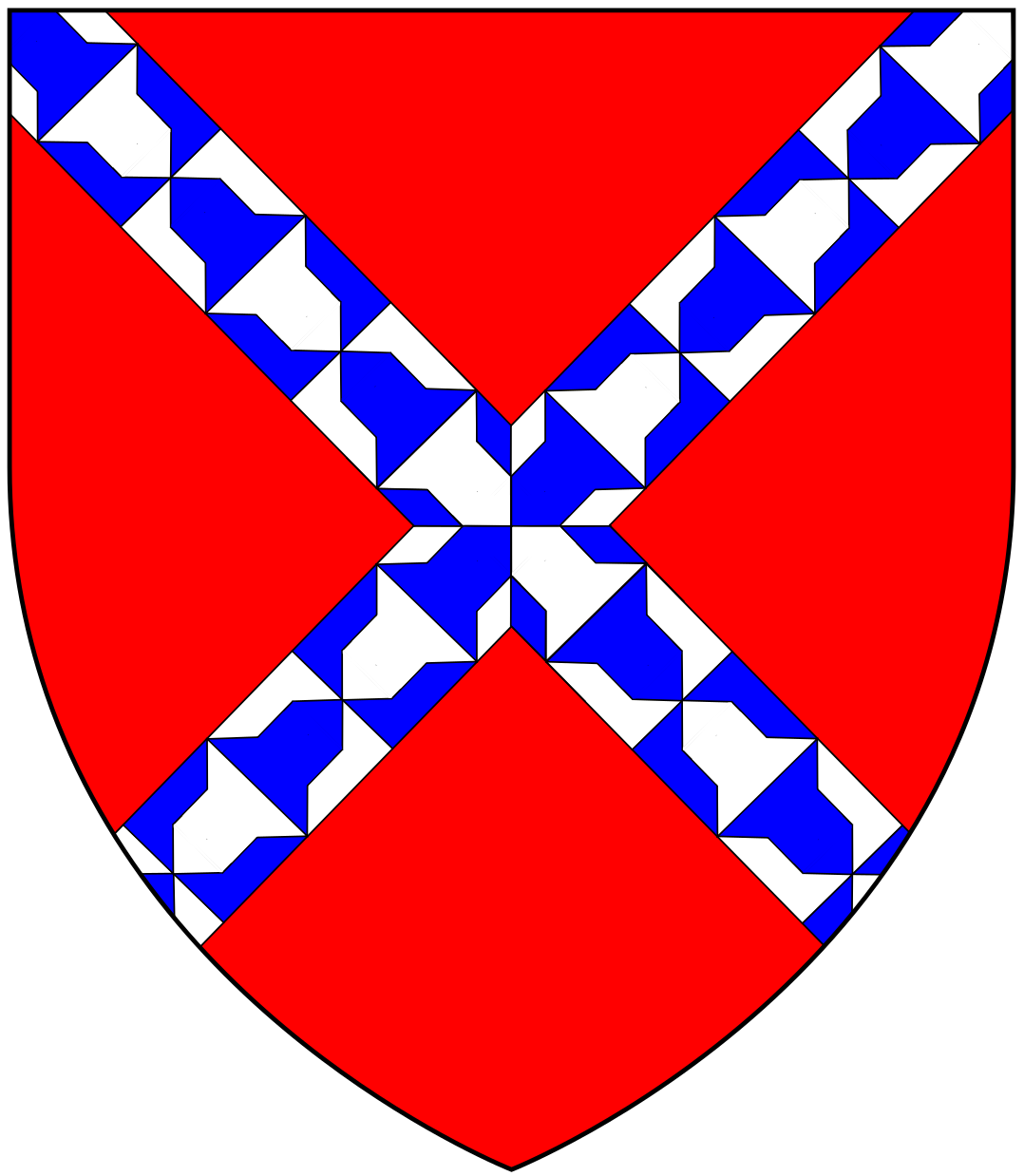
Willington arms: Gules, a saltire vair

The de Willington family originated at the manor of Willington near Repton in Derbyshireand later lived at Yate, Gloucestershire. Ralph de Willington (died pre-1242) married Olympia (died post 1242), heiress of Sandhurst, in Gloucestershire, granddaughter of a certain Wymark, and widow of John Frenchevaler. In about 1200 Wymark had granted to St Peter's Abbey, Gloucester, (now Gloucester Cathedral) 6 acres of land in Longford, within the manor of Sandhurst, for the purpose of mending the "ironwork of horses" belonging to visiting monks. The grant was later confirmed by Ralph Willington, husband of Olympia. Between 1224 and 1228 Ralph Willington and his wife Olympia built the Lady Chapel in St Peter's Abbey, Gloucester. Ralph also held (from Thomas de Beaumont, 6th Earl of Warwick (1208–1242) as overlord) the manor of Poulton in Awre, Gloucestershire.

- Ralph de Willington married Joan de Champernon, heiress of Umberleigh in Devon, during the reign of Edward I (1272–1307). The Willington family appear thenceforth to have adopted Umberleigh as their seat in Devonshire. The descendants of Ralph de Willington and Joan de Champernon were as follows:
- Ralph de Willington (eldest son), called by Risdon "a worthy warrior", was governor of Exeter Castle in 1253 and Sheriff of Devon in 1254 or 1257. (The seat of the Sheriff of Devon was the royal castle of Exeter). He married Juliana de Lomene, daughter and heiress of Sir Richard de Lomene of "Lomen" (modern Uplowman, near Tiverton) and Gittisham.
- John de Willington (died 1338/9), eldest son and heir, who on 8 August 1299 obtained a royal licence to crenellate his mansion at Yate.

=== Beaumont ===
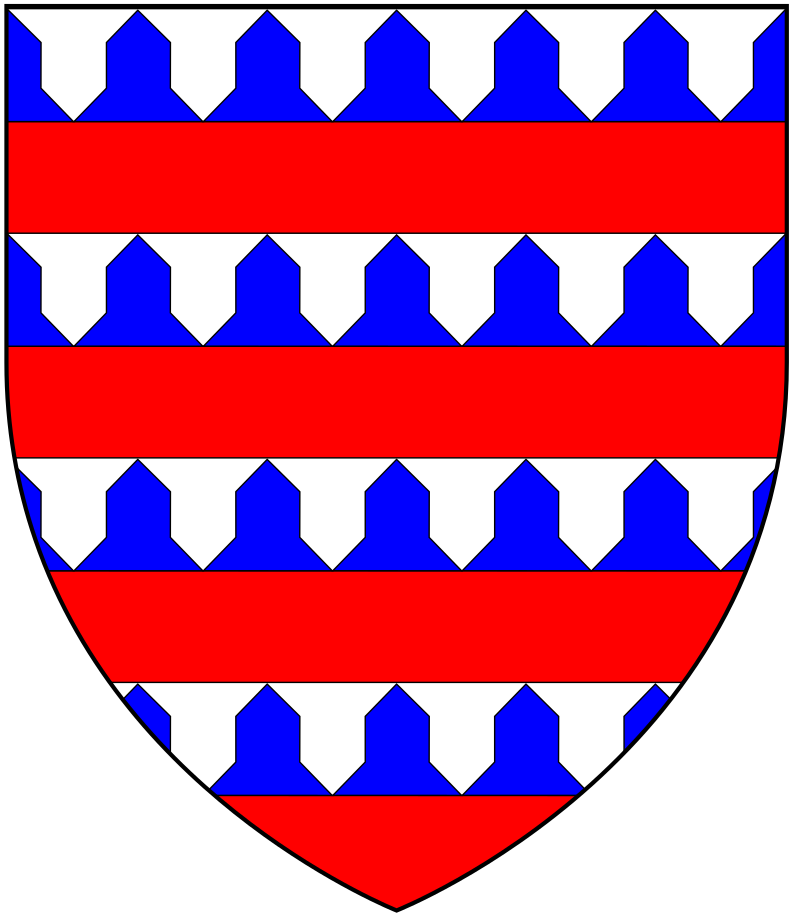
Beaumont arms: Barry of six vair and gules. These arms can be seen on the monument in Gittisham Church, Devon, to Henry Beaumont (died 1590/1) of Combe, also on the monument in Atherington Church, Devon, of Sir John Bassett (died 1529) of Umberleigh

The Beaumont family, seated at Youlston within their Manor of Shirwell in North Devon, was the heir of the Willingtons.

- William Beaumont was Sheriff of Devon in 1399, and held the Castle and Borough of Barnstaple. He further increased the family's estates by marrying Isabel Willington, daughter of Sir John Willington of Umberleigh, and co-heiress of her brother John Willington (died 1396). The effigies of a Willington knight beside his Lady existed in Umberleigh Chapel prior to their removal to Atherington Church in about 1820, where they are visible today.
- Sir Thomas Beaumont (1401–1450), son and heir, born at the Willington manor of Yate in Gloucestershire. He married twice, the offspring of which two marriages became successively heirs to his estates, in a complex series of inheritances. Firstly he married Phillipa Dynham, daughter of Sir John Dynham and aunt to John Dynham, 1st Baron Dynham (died 1501), by whom he had 3 sons and 2 daughters. From these children descended two important parallel lines: Firstly an adulterous line of the Bodrugan family which adopted the name Beaumont and which inherited the Beaumont manor of Gittisham, and secondly the later very influential Basset family which inherited the Beaumont former Willington manor of Umberleigh, (which became their early seat) and the Beaumont former Pont-de-Chardon manor of Heanton Punchardon, which became their later seat. Secondly Sir Thomas Beaumont married Alice Stukeley, daughter of Hugh Stukeley of Affeton, Devon, by whom he had a further 3 sons, from one of whom was descended the Chichester family of Raleigh, which inherited the Domesday Book Beaumont manors of Shirwell and Loxhore and which moved its seat from Raleigh to Youlston in the late 17th century.
- William Beaumont (1427–1453).
- Philip Beaumont (1432–1473), of Shirwell in North Devon and of Gittisham in East Devon, Member of Parliament for a constituency in Devon and Sheriff of Devon in 1469. He was the rightful heir of his elder brother William Beaumont (1427–1453), a substantial landholder, but faced claims to his inheritance from his bastard nephew, John Bodrugan, "The Beaumont Bastard", the illegitimate son of Joan Courtenay, William's wife.

=== Putt ===
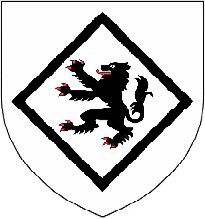
Putt arms: Argent, a lion rampant within a mascle sable

The descent of Combe in the Putt family was as follows:

- Nicholas Putt, Sheriff of Devon in 1644, who purchased Combe in 1614. His father and grandfather had lived at Berry Pomeroy. During the Civil War he was a Royalist and in 1644 he was arrested at Combe by Parliamentarian forces, at which time the house was ransacked and set on fire. On the way to imprisonment and trial in London, he died at Axminster in Devon.
- William Putt (died 1663), son and heir, married Jane Every, daughter of William Every of Cothays, Somerset.

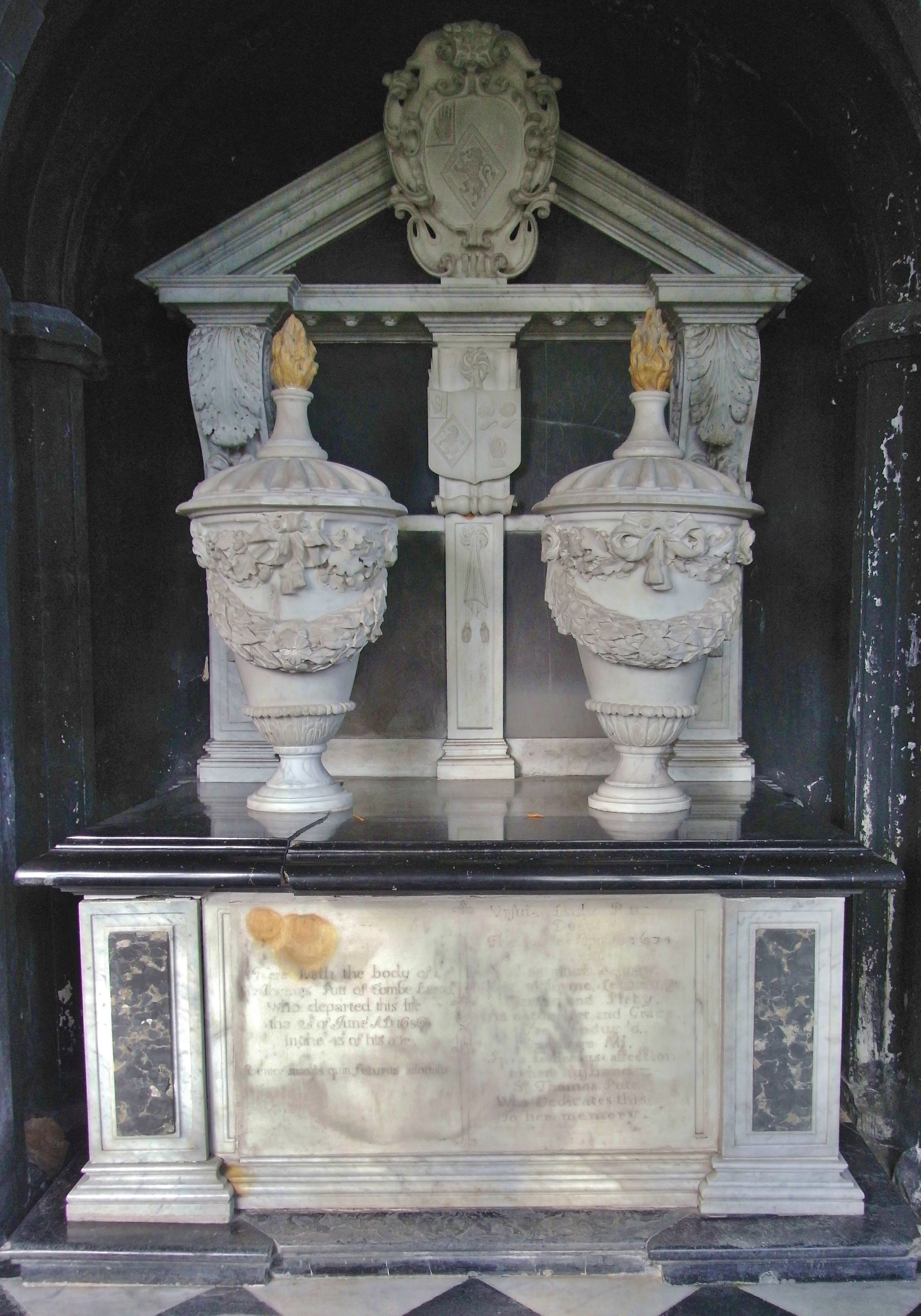
Monument to Sir Thomas Putt, 1st Baronet (1644–1686), Gittisham Church

- Sir Thomas Putt, 1st Baronet (1644–1686), eldest son and heir, created a baronet in 1666. He served as Member of Parliament for Honiton, Devon, March 1679, October 1679, 1681, 16 April - 15 June 1685 and 3 October 1685 - 25 June 1686. He was Mayor of Honiton in 1685. He married Ursula Cholmondeley (died 1674), daughter of Col. Richard Cholmondeley (1620–1644), of Grosmont, county York, Knight, a lady-in-waiting to Queen Catherine of Braganza, wife of King Charles II (1660–1685). Richard Cholmondeley was a Royalist commander during the Civil War, and had served as Governor of Axminster and was a son-in-law to John Poulett, 1st Baron Poulett, (1585–1649) of Hinton St George, Somerset. He was killed at Lyme Regis in Dorset in October 1644 and was buried at Brixton, Devon. He was the son of Sir Richard Cholmondeley (Cholmley, Cholmely, 1580–1631), of Whitby, Yorkshire, MP for Scarborough 1620-1, member of a junior branch of the Cholmondley family of Cholmondley in Cheshire, later Earl of Leinster and Marquess of Cholmondley. Sir Thomas Putt's monument survives in Gittisham Church, described by Pevsner (2004) as: "A spectacular affairwith a big tomb-chest in an arched recess of black marble. On the chest two oversized garlanded white marble urns. The back wall of the recess with blank architecture of pediment on brackets. The whole cold, competent, expensive and metropolitan". The maker was possibly William Stanton or William Kidwell, with urns possibly by Edward Pierce. On the back wall are shown the arms of Putt: Argent, a lion rampant within a mascle sable, with a canton of the Red Hand of Ulster for a baronet, impaling Cholmondeley: Gules, in chief two esquire's helmets argent in base a garb or.
- Sir Thomas Putt, 2nd Baronet (c. 1675 – 1721). He married twice, firstly to Margaret Trevelyan, daughter of Sir George Trevelyan, 1st Baronet (c. 1635 – 1671) of Nettlecombe in Somerset, and secondly to .... Prestwood. He died without male children when the baronetcy became extinct. His funeral hatchment survives in Gittisham Church.
- William Thomas Putt (1725–1797), 18th century clergyman and squire of the Combe estate He obtained a BCL in 1751.
- Thomas Putt (1757–1787), "Black Tom", descendant. He was educated at Queens College, Oxford, and later trained as a lawyer in the Middle Temple, and was called to the bar. He was a keen gardener and planted Beech Walk, Bellevue and the terraced gardens at Combe. He was probably the creator of the "Tom Putt" variety of apple tree, as is suggested by his having won prizes at the Honiton Horticultural Shows for his fruit trees. He made considerable additions to Combe House, including the surviving "Georgian Kitchen" and the Orangery, intended to have been three times the size of the completed building. His epithet "Black Tom" derives from his notoriously bad temper. It is said by residents of the village of Gittisham that when the church bells rang they were repeating "Hang Tom Putt".
- William Putt, brother and heir, who completed "Black Tom"'s building works on a reduced scale.
- Raymundo Putt (1773–1812), of Combe, who in 1810 was lord of the manor of Gittisham and patron of Gittisham Church. His mural monument survives in Gittisham Church.
- Thomas Putt (1832–1844), descendant, last in the male line who died unmarried and bequeathed his estates to his sister Margaretta Putt (died 1846), who married Rev Henry Marker, to the descendants of which marriage descended the Putt estates.

=== Marker ===
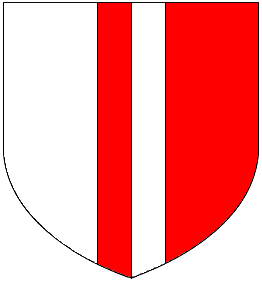
Marker arms: Per pale argent and gules a pale counterchanged

The descent of Combe in the Marker family was as follows:

==== Rev. Henry Marker ====
Rev. Henry Marker of Aylesbeare, Devon, who married Margaretta Putt (died 1846), the heiress of Combe. He had children including:

- Henry William Marker (died 1865), eldest son and heir
- Rev. Thomas John Marker (died 1854), whose son was the eventual heir to Combe.
- Rev. Richard John Marker (died 1855), Rector of Uffculme, Devon, of Yondercott House, Uffculme. He occupied the honourable position of Recorder of Bradninch 1818-1855, and his armorials are shown in a stained glass window in Bradninch Church. In 1847 he expended £3,400 of his own funds to rebuild the tower and spire of St Mary's Church, Uffculme, and also donated the great bell and clock. His heir was his son-in-law Rev. George Townsend Smith (1795–1874), son of Rev. George Smith of Ottery St Mary and Curate of Upper Ottery (1818–33) and Vicar of Uffculme (1833–1874) and husband of Margaret Frances Marker, whom he had married at Aylesbeare in 1834. In 1855 he assumed the surname Marker in lieu of Smith, in accordance with the terms of his inheritance. The arms of Marker survive in a stained glass window in Uffculme Church.

==== Henry William Marker (died 1865) ====
Henry William Marker (died 1865), eldest son and heir, a spendthrift who kept his own pack of hounds. He fled to the Continent to escape his creditors.

==== Richard Marker (1835–1916) ====
Richard Marker (1835–1916), nephew and heir, son of Rev. Thomas John Marker (died 1854) by his wife Frances Amelia Drewe, daughter of Samuel Drewe. Educated at Harrow School and Christ Church, Oxford, Patron of two livings, a Justice of the Peace for Devon and Dorset and a Deputy Lieutenant for Devon. In 1865 he married Hon. Victoria Alexandrina Digby (died 1917), daughter of Edward Digby, 9th Baron Digby (1809–1889) of Minterne, Dorchester, Dorset. He was welcomed by his tenants at Gittisham with much ceremony, which included his carriage being drawn from Gittisham Farm to Combe by manpower, the horses having been released from the shafts. He was predeceased by his eldest son and heir apparent:

  - Lt-Col. Raymond John Marker (1867–1914), DSO, eldest son and heir apparent. Educated at Eton College. In 1906 he married Beatrice Jackson, daughter of the Hong Kong banker Sir Thomas Jackson, 1st Baronet of Stansted, Essex. He was wounded in active service during World War I and died from his injuries on 13 November 1914. He joined the Coldstream Guards and sailed for France in 1914. He served as Deputy Assistant Adjutant and Quartermaster General to the 1st Army Corps, and served on the staff of Earl Haig. His wife nursed him in France and brought his body back for burial at Gittisham Church. His portrait survives in the sitting room of Combe House.

==== Richard Raymond Kitchener Marker (1908–1961) ====
Richard Raymond Kitchener Marker (1908–1961), grandson and heir, only child of Lt-Col. Raymond John Marker (1867–1914). Educated at Eton College and Trinity College, Cambridge. He was the historian of the Marker family and of Combe. In 1934 he married Rosemary Grace Fairholme, daughter of Edward Fairholme of The Old Vicarage, Penn, Buckinghamshire, but died without children, when his heir (in her issue) became his first cousin Ruth Gertrude Marker (born 1923), a twin daughter of Edward Richard Marker (born 1872) (younger son of Richard Marker (1835–1916) by his wife Margaret Bagot) and wife of John Trelawny (died 2006) of Vancouver, British Columbia, Canada.

=== Trelawny (Marker) ===
- Richard Trelawny (born 1953), eldest son and heir, born and raised in Canada, who in 1961 aged 8 inherited from his mother's cousin, Richard Raymond Kitchener Marker (1908–1961), a beneficial interest (as beneficiary of a trust) in Combe and Gittisham, and an absolute title on attaining his majority at the age of 21, on condition that he should adopt the surname Marker in lieu of his patronymic, which he duly performed. He was the son of John Trelawny (died 2006) by his wife Ruth Gertrude Marker (1923-2013). In 1946 Ruth Gertrude Marker emigrated to Vancouver in Canada to marry John Trelawny (1919-2006) formerly of Cotleigh, Devon, who having trained at Sandhurst served in World War II, in which he was injured resulting in a leg amputation. Following the war John Trelawny emigrated to Vancouver in Canada, where he married Ruth Marker. John Trelawny obtained a degree in botany and biology and became head laboratory instructor at the University of Victoria and established a bulb farm. In 1968 the trustees of Richard Trelawney let Combe House on a long lease to Mr Gomel, who turned it into one of England's first "Country House Hotels". In 1969 the lease was purchased by John and Thérèse Boswell who ran the hotel until 1998, when the lease was again sold to Ken & Ruth Hunt, the proprietors of Combe House Hotel in 2015. In 1974 having attained his majority Richard Trelawney inherited an absolute title to the Marker estates and changed his name to Marker, in accordance with the bequest. He ran a successful business building timber framed houses in Canada. In 1978 he married Petronela ('Nellie'), a Canadian from Vancouver. In 1982 he returned with his wife to England live in Beech Walk, Gittisham, to manage his estate. He has 4 daughters, the eldest of whom is Karissa Marker (born 1980, Canada). In 2004 Richard Marker sold 15 houses in the village of Gittisham to the property company Northumberland & Durham and 8 more to private owners. "This decision was not taken lightly, but since the upkeep and maintenance of a complete village had always been unviable, it was time for the Estate to move on".

== Sources ==
- Marker, Richard R.K. (1908–1961), The History of Combe House and Gittisham Village
- Thorn, Caroline & Frank, (eds.) Domesday Book, (Morris, John, gen. ed.) Vol. 9, Devon, Parts 1 & 2, Phillimore Press, Chichester, 1985
- Beaumont, Edward T., The Beaumonts in History. A.D. 850-1850. Oxford, c. 1929, esp. chapter 5, pp. 56–72, "The Devonshire Family"
- Vivian, Lt.Col. J.L., (ed.) The Visitations of the County of Devon: Comprising the Heralds' Visitations of 1531, 1564 & 1620, Exeter, 1895, p. 46, pedigree of Basset; p. 65, pedigree of Beaumont of Gittisham
- Byrne, Muriel St. Clare, (ed.) The Lisle Letters, 6 vols, University of Chicago Press, Chicago & London, 1981, vol.1, pp. 299–350, "Grenvilles and Bassets" & vol.4, Chapter 7 re "The Great Indenture". (Explains the descent of the Beaumont lands following the death of the last male of the Beaumonts of Devon)
- Pole, Sir William (died 1635), Collections Towards a Description of the County of Devon, Sir John-William de la Pole (ed.), London, 1791, esp. pp. 166–168, Gittesham; pp. 407–409, Shirwell. (Pole's text provides in the opinion of Byrne, provides "the essential information" for an understanding of the Beaumont family history 1450-1500.(Byrne, 1981, vol.4, p. 1))
- Burke's Genealogical and Heraldic History of the Landed Gentry, 15th Edition, ed. Pirie-Gordon, H., London, 1937, p. 1525, Pedigree of Marker of Combe
