= Philip Beaumont (1432–1473) =

English nobleman (1432–1473)

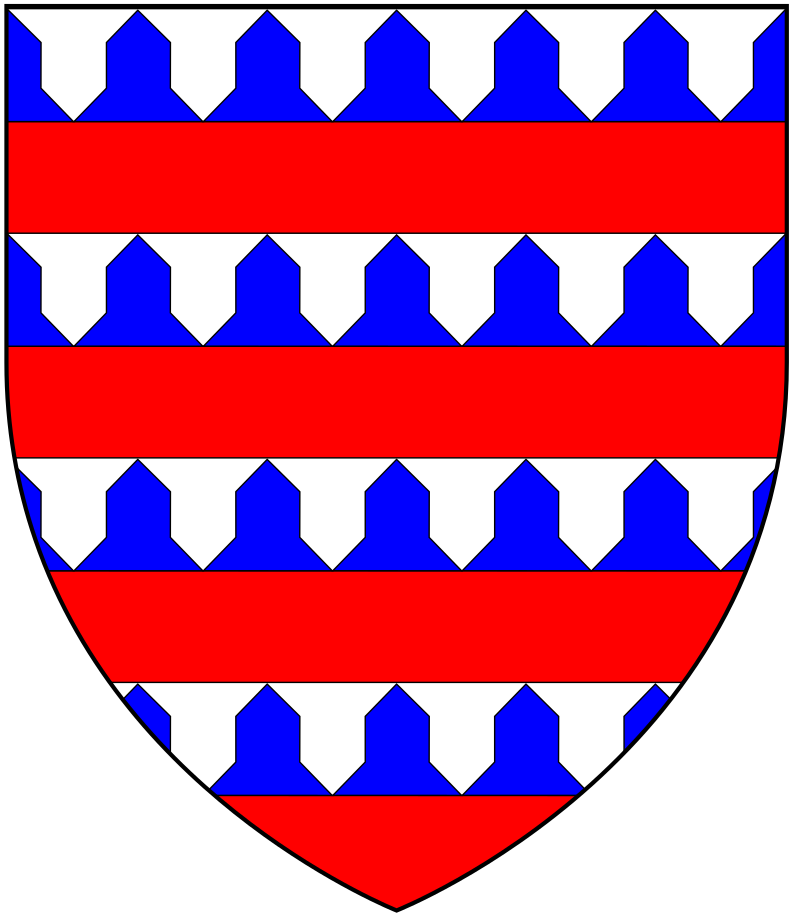
- Arms of Beaumont of Youlston, Shirwell: Barry of six vair and gules. (Note: These arms can be seen on the monument in Gittisham Church, Devon, to Henry (Bodrugan-) Beaumont (died 1590/1), also on the monument in Atherington Church, Devon, of Sir John Bassett (died 1529) of Umberleigh. They are the same arms as quartered for de Coucy 1st & 4th as shown in the Gelre Armorial (c. 1370–1414) by Enguerrand VII, Lord of Coucy, 1st Earl of Bedford (1340–1397). The only previous holder of that Earldom was Hugh de Beaumont, 3rd son of Robert de Beaumont who held Shirwell, Ashford & Loxhore.)

Personal details
- Born: 1432
- Died: 12 June 1473 (aged 40–41)
- Spouse: Blanche Bourchier
- Relatives: William Beaumont (brother); John Dinham (grandfather)

Philip Beaumont (1432–1473), lord of the manors of Shirwell in North Devon and of Gittisham in East Devon, was a member of parliament for a constituency in Devon and was Sheriff of Devon in 1469. He was the rightful heir of his elder brother William Beaumont (1427–1453), a substantial landholder, but faced claims to his inheritance from his bastard nephew, John Bodrugan, "The Beaumont Bastard", the illegitimate son of Joan Courtenay, William's wife.

== Origins ==
The Beaumont family of Devon, generally said to have been seated at the estate of Youlston within their manor of Shirwell in North Devon, is supposed by that family's historian Edward Beaumont in his 1929 work The Beaumonts in History. A.D. 850–1850, to have descended from Hugh de Beaumont, 1st Earl of Bedford (b.1106), Surviving records do not however allow a definite familial link to be made between the Norman Beaumonts and the Beaumonts of Shirwell, Ashford and the two Loxhores of North Devon. Thus the link made by Edward Beaumont in his 1929 work is supposition.

== Biography ==
Philip Beaumont was the third son of Sir Thomas Beaumont (1401–1450) of Shirwell by his first wife Philippa Dinham, a daughter of Sir John Dinham (1359–1428) of Hartland in North Devon, Kingskerswell and Nutwell in South Devon, Buckland Dinham in Somerset and Cardinham in Cornwall.

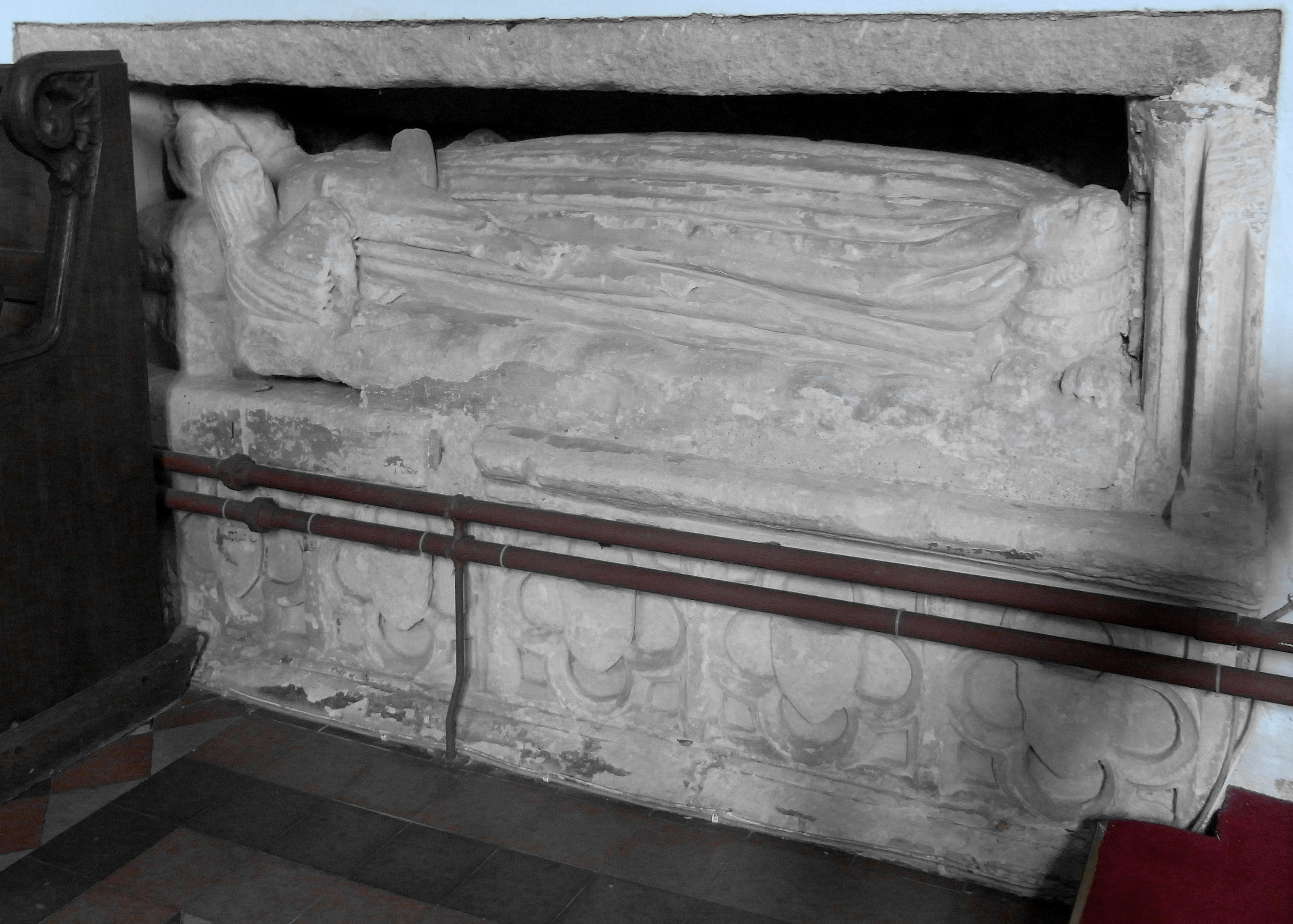
Effigy of Blanche Bourchier (died 1483), Shirwell Church

He married Blanche Bourchier, a daughter of William Bourchier, 9th Baron FitzWarin (1407–1470) of Tawstock, feudal baron of Bampton and heir to a moiety of the feudal barony of Barnstaple, both in Devon. The marriage was childless. She survived him and remarried to Bartholomew St Leger "of Kent". She died on 4 January 1483, and a stone effigy of her survives in Shirwell Church.

Beaumont died on 12 June 1473. His will was dated 1 January 1472/3 and requested that a marble stone should be laid on his body, with his arms graven on it, and his portraiture of copper, with this inscription on it:

Testis sis tu Christe, quod non-jacet hic lapis iste

Corpus ut ornetur, sed ut spiritus memoretur.

Be thou witness, O Christ, that this stone does not lie here to adorn the Body, but to commemorate the spirit.

Clearly this had not been performed by 1488 as in that year his younger half-brother and heir Thomas Beaumont (died 1488) repeated the request in his own will.

The rhyming Latin verse may be translated as: "Thou art a witness O Christ that this stone is not an adornment for the body but a memorial for his soul". Whether the stone was eventually laid down is not known, but no such brass survives.

== Succession ==
Beaumont bequeathed his estates in two directions:

The manors of Umberleigh and Heanton Punchardon were left to his nephew Sir John Bassett (1441–1485) of Whitechapel in Devon, the son of his sister Joan Beaumont who had married John Bassett (1374–1463) of Whitechapel, Bishops Nympton, Devon, and of Tehidy in Cornwall, Sheriff of Cornwall in 1449.

The other part of Philip Beaumont's bequest, including Shirwell, went to his eldest half-brother Thomas Beaumont (died 1487/8), whose eventual heir was his niece Margaret (or Maud) Beaumont and her husband John Chichester (1472–1538) of Raleigh. The Chichester family later made Youlston, the chief estate in Shirwell, their principal seat.

== Sources ==
- Beaumont, Edward T., The Beaumonts in History. A.D. 850–1850. Oxford, c. 1929, esp. chapter 5, pp. 56–72, "The Devonshire Family"
- Byrne, Muriel St. Clare, (ed.) The Lisle Letters, 6 vols, University of Chicago Press, Chicago & London, 1981, vol.1, pp. 299–350, "Grenvilles and Bassets" & vol.4, Chapter 7 re "The Great Indenture". (Explains the descent of the Beaumont lands following the death of the last male of the Beaumonts of Devon)
- Pole, Sir William (died 1635), Collections Towards a Description of the County of Devon, Sir John-William de la Pole (ed.), London, 1791, esp. pp. 166–168, Gittesham; pp. 407–409, Shirwell. (Pole's text provides in the opinion of Byrne, provides "the essential information" for an understanding of the Beaumont family history 1450–1500.(Byrne, 1981, vol.4, p. 1))
- Vivian, Lt.Col. J.L., (ed.) The Visitations of the County of Devon: Comprising the Heralds' Visitations of 1531, 1564 & 1620, Exeter, 1895, p. 46, pedigree of Basset; p. 65, pedigree of Beaumont of Gittisham
