= Manor of Shirwell =

Coordinates: 51°07′N 4°00′W

The Manor of Shirwell was a manor in North Devon, England, centred on the village of Shirwell and largely co-terminous with the parish of Shirwell. It was for many centuries successively the seat of two of the leading families of North Devon, the Beaumonts and their heirs the Chichesters of Raleigh, Pilton, both of which families were seated at the estate of Youlston within the manor of Shirwell. The manor house which survives today known as Youlston Park is one of the most architecturally important historic houses in North Devon and exists largely in its Georgian form, but retains many impressive late 17th-century interiors.

== Descent of the manor ==
=== de Meulles ===
In the Domesday Book of 1086 it was one of the 176 landholdings in Devon held in-chief by Baldwin de Meulles, Sheriff of Devon, who held the largest fiefdom in Devon and was the 1st feudal baron of Okehampton.

Baldwin de Meulles' tenant at Shirwell as listed in Domesday Book was "Robert de Beaumont". The Courtenay family, later Earls of Devon, were from 1219 the successors to the feudal barony of Okehampton and thus continued as overlords of Shirwell into the 13th century, as recorded in the Book of Fees, and beyond.

=== Beaumont of Beaumont-le-Roger, Normandy ===
In the Domesday Book of 1086 Ascerewelle (Shirwell) was one of at least four manors held in Devon, but merely as a mesne lord from Baldwin de Meulles, by the Norman magnate Robert de Beaumont, 1st Earl of Leicester, Count of Meulan (c. 1040/50 – 1118), to whom had been granted by William the Conqueror about 91 English manors in several counties for his service in the Norman Conquest of England. These four manors tenanted by Robert are listed consecutively within the section in Domesday Book listing Baldwin's holdings, as Shirwell, Ashford and two manors called Loxhore, thought to correspond to today's adjacent settlements of Higher Loxhore and Lower Loxhore.

Robert is listed as the tenant of Shirwell simply as "Robert", but his next three holdings are listed in the Exon Domesday with Robert's appellation de Bello Monte added (the Latinised form of de Beaumont), in the form "Robert de Beaumont also holds..." This leaves no doubt that Shirwell too refers to Roger de Beaumont. There exist many other Devon manors held by persons called "Robert" but none can be identified with certainty to Robert de Beaumont. These four manors stayed for many generations within a line of the Beaumont family, seated at Youlston within the parish of Shirwell. Surviving records do not allow a definite familial link to be made between the Norman Beaumonts and the Beaumonts of Shirwell, but the Beaumont family historian Edward Beaumont in his 1929 work The Beaumonts in History. A.D. 850–1850, hazarded a guess that the Devon family descended from Robert's third son Hugh de Beaumont, 1st Earl of Bedford (born 1106).

== de Poilley ==
A confusion arises as to the early tenure of Shirwell as another manor named Sirewelle is listed in Domesday Book as held in demesne by William of Poilley, as one of his 21 Devon holdings, but all held as a tenant-in-chief of the king, not from Baldwin the Sheriff. This manor was held before the Norman Conquest by Wulfward, whilst the Beaumont manor of Shirwell was held previously by Brictmer. It may be that the Beaumont part was Youlston whilst the remnant of today's parish was held by de Poilley, whose share was in that case certainly acquired by the Beaumont family at an early time.

=== Beaumont of Devon ===
The descent of Beaumont of Youlston, Shirwell is given in the Heralds' Visitation of Devon as follows:

- Sir Richard de Beaumont (13th century). The earliest positively identifiable descendant of the Domesday tenant Robert de Beaumont was the 13th-century Sir Richard Beaumont, whose family had long been seated at the capital estate of Youlston within the manor of Shirwell. His eldest son and heir was Philip Beaumont (died c. 1272), of Youlston, and his younger son was William Beaumont, called in the Heralds' Visitation of Devon "of Sabrecot", to whom he granted the manor of Loxhore. Sabrecot appears to survive today as an estate calles Shepscott, about 3 miles south of Youlston, and 7 miles south-west of Loxhore Church, anciently known as Shebescote et al., and this branch of the family eventually inherited Shirwell also, on the failure of the senior male line.
- Philip Beaumont (died c. 1272), eldest son and heir, of Youlston married Ermengard Punchardon, daughter and co-heiress of Sir John Punchardon of Heanton Punchardon in Devon. This family were listed in Domesday Book as de Pont-Chardon holding Hantone, also as tenants of Baldwin the Sheriff.
- Sir John Beaumont (died 1330), eldest son and heir, of Youlston, MP for Devon in 1326, who married Alice Scudamore.
- John Beaumont, son and heir, who married Alice, of unknown family.
- William Beaumont, only son and heir, who died childless leaving his sister Joan Beaumont as his heiress.
- Joan Beaumont (sister) was the wife of Sir James Chudleigh. She too died without children and the Beaumont estates, now enlarged by the addition of the Punchardon lands, passed to her cousin John Beaumont (died 1378/80), of Sepscott.
- John Beaumont (died 1379/80), of Sepscott, (cousin), was a grandson of William Beaumont, who had been granted Loxhore by his father Sir Richard Beaumont, and son of Richard Beaumont. John Beaumont married Joane Crawthorne (or Crawstone), the heiress of her grandfather Sir Robert Stockey, MP in 1318. He purchased the North Devon manor of Parkham. His daughter Catherine Beaumont (died 1435), married Sir Hugh Luttrell (c.1364–1428), feudal baron of Dunster, of Dunster Castle in Somerset. Alabaster effigies survive in Dunster Church of Hugh Luttrell and his wife Catherine Beaumont, badly mutilated. The arms of Beaumont (Barry of six vair and gules) appear in Dunster Church and on the Luttrell Table Carpet, c.1520, now in the collection of the Burrell Collection in Glasgow. Also on the sculpted stone heraldic panel, erected by Sir Hugh Luttrell (died 1521) above the western arch of the Gatehouse to Dunster Castle.
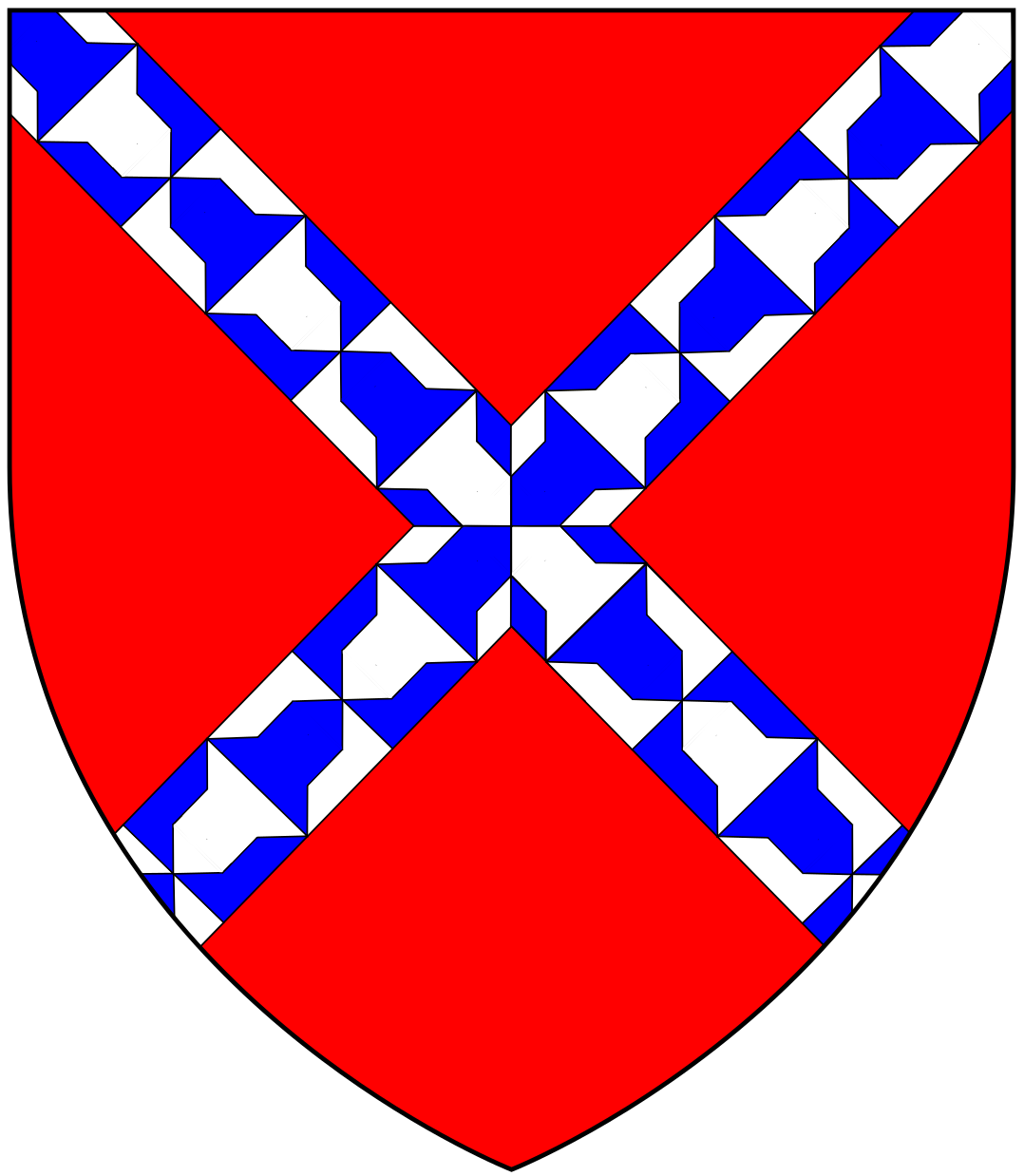
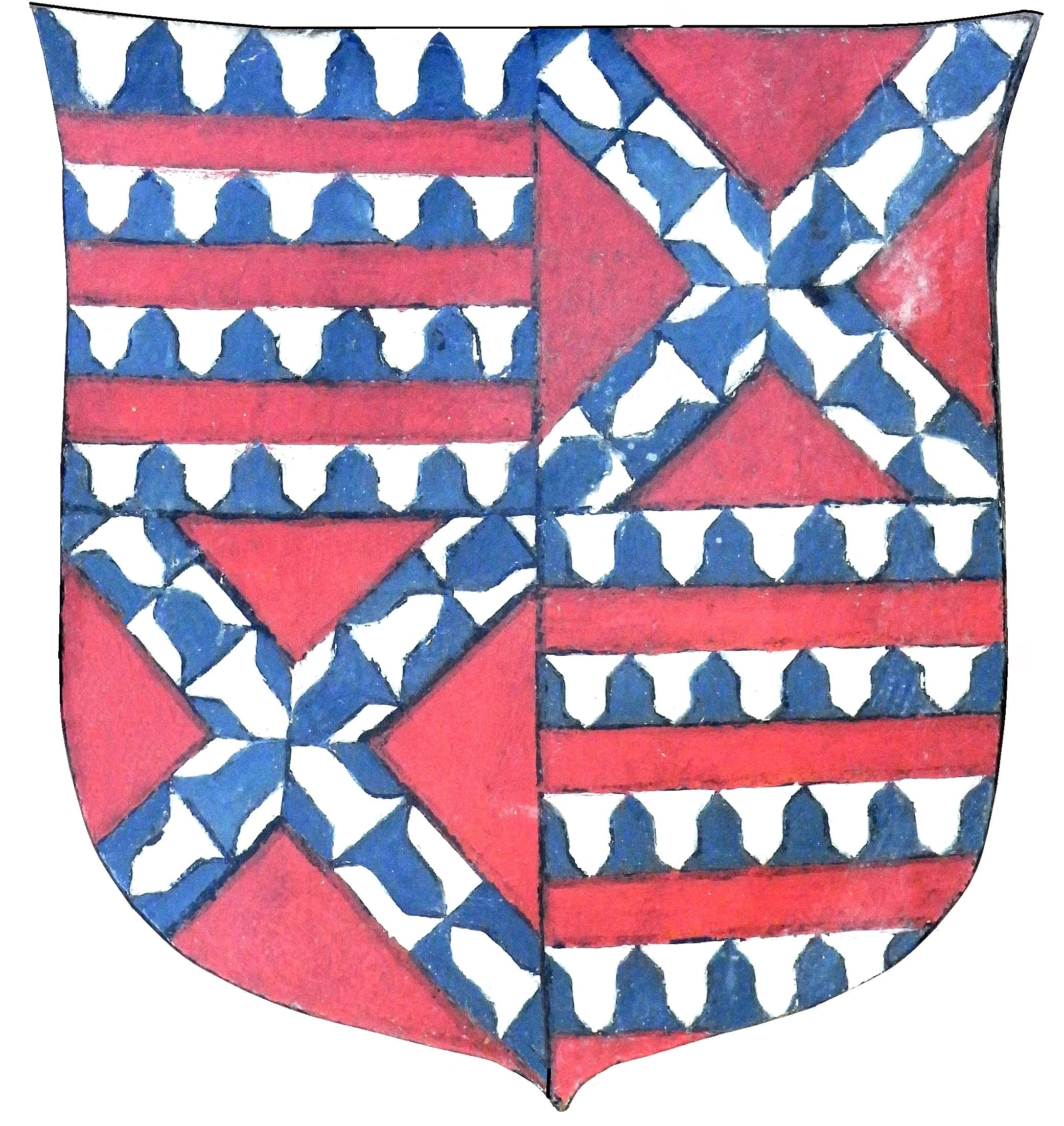
Left: Arms of Willington of Umberleigh, Devon and Barcheston in Warwickshire: Gules, a saltire vair Right: Heraldic escutcheon on monument to Henry Beaumont (died 1591) of Gittisham, Gittisham Church, Devon. Arms: Quarterly 1st & 4th: Barry of six vair and gules (Beaumont of Youlston, Shirwell; shown here unusually as barry of seven); 2nd & 3rd: Gules, a saltire vair (Willington of Umberleigh, Devon and Barcheston, Warwickshire)

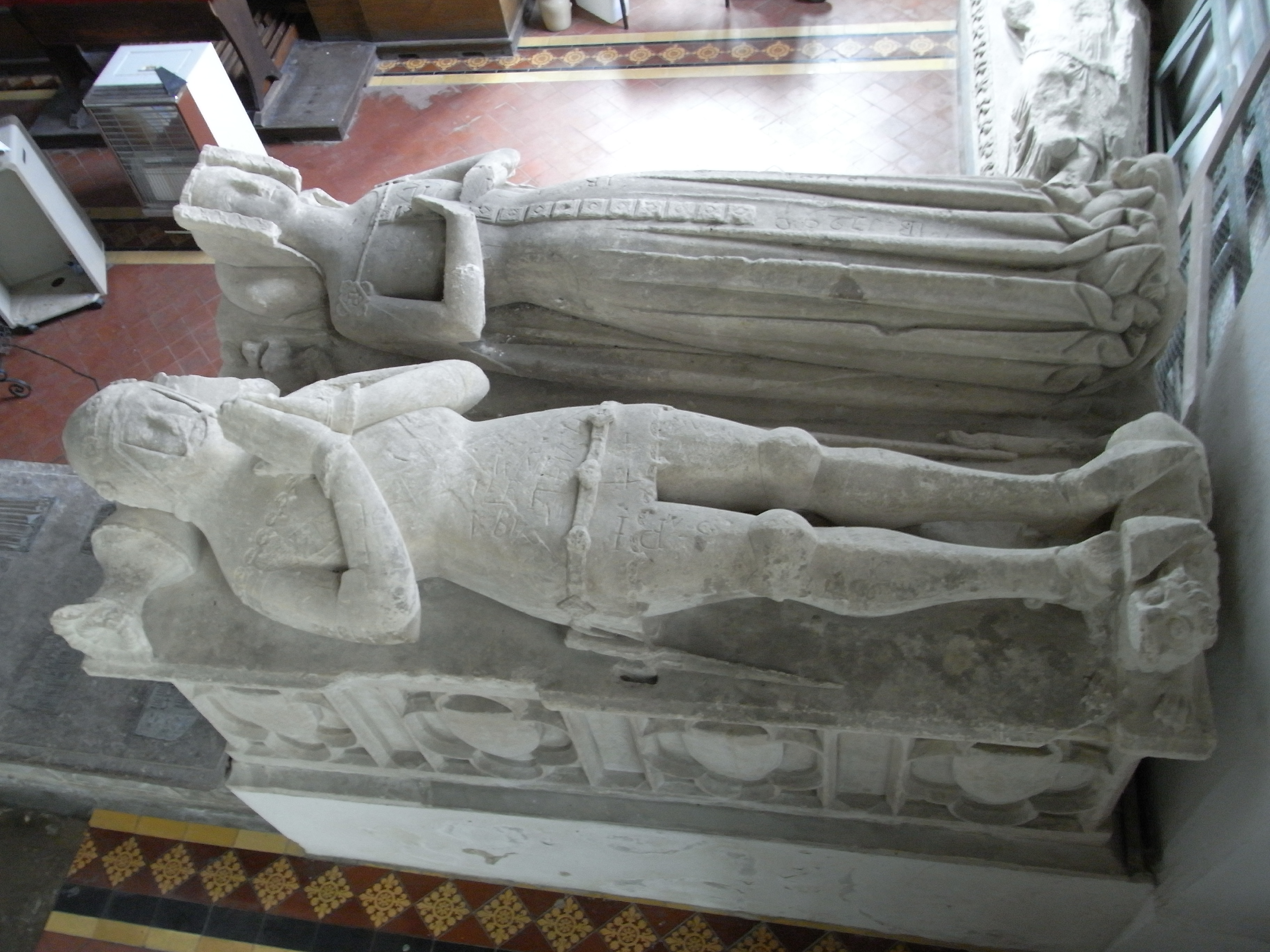
Willington effigies in their present location in Atherington Church, north side of chancel, on a 19th-century plinth. The Willington armorial saltire is still visible, much worn, on the knight's surcoat covering his chest

- William Beaumont (son and heir), was Sheriff of Devon in 1399, and held the Castle and Borough of Barnstaple. He further increased the family's estates by marrying Isabel Willington, daughter of Sir John Willington of Umberleigh, and co-heiress of her brother John Willington (died 1396). The effigies of a Willington knight beside his Lady existed in Umberleigh Chapel prior to their removal to Atherington Church in about 1820, where they are visible today.
- Sir Thomas Beaumont (1401–1450), son and heir, born at the Willington manor of Yate in Gloucestershire. He married twice, the offspring of which two marriages became successively heirs to his estates, in a complex series of inheritances. Firstly he married Phillipa Dynham, daughter of Sir John Dynham and aunt to John Dynham, 1st Baron Dynham (died 1501), by whom he had 3 sons and 2 daughters. From these children descended two important parallel lines: Firstly an adulterous line of the Bodrugan family which adopted the name Beaumont and which inherited the Beaumont manor of Gittisham, and secondly the later very influential Basset family which inherited the Beaumont former Willington manor of Umberleigh, (which became their early seat) and the Beaumont former Pont-de-Chardon manor of Heanton Punchardon, which became their later seat. Secondly Sir Thomas Beaumont married Alice Stukeley, daughter of Hugh Stukeley of Affeton, Devon, by whom he had a further 3 sons, from one of whom was descended the Chichester family of Raleigh, which inherited the Domesday Book Beaumont manors of Shirwell and Loxhore and which moved its seat from Raleigh to Youlston in the late 17th century.

=== Descent from Sir Thomas Beaumont (died 1450) ===
- Firstly he married Phillipa Dynham, daughter of Sir John Dinham (1359–1428) of Kingskerswell and aunt to John Dynham, 1st Baron Dynham (1433–1501), by whom he had three sons and two daughters:
  - Richard Beaumont, his eldest son who died childless before his father.
  - William Beaumont (1427–1453), second son, who married Joan Courtenay, said to have been a daughter of his contemporary "Sir William Courtenay" (1428–1485) of Powderham, more probably of the latter's father Sir Philip Courtenay (1404–1463). The marriage was childless but Joan had an extra-marital affair with Sir Henry Bodrugan of Cornwall, whom she later married after her first husband's death. A son was born to Joan named John Bodrugan, who claimed to have been the son of William Beaumont, and after a lengthy legal case was granted the subsidiary Beaumont manor of Gittisham and changed his family name to Beaumont. This family continued several generations at Gittisham.

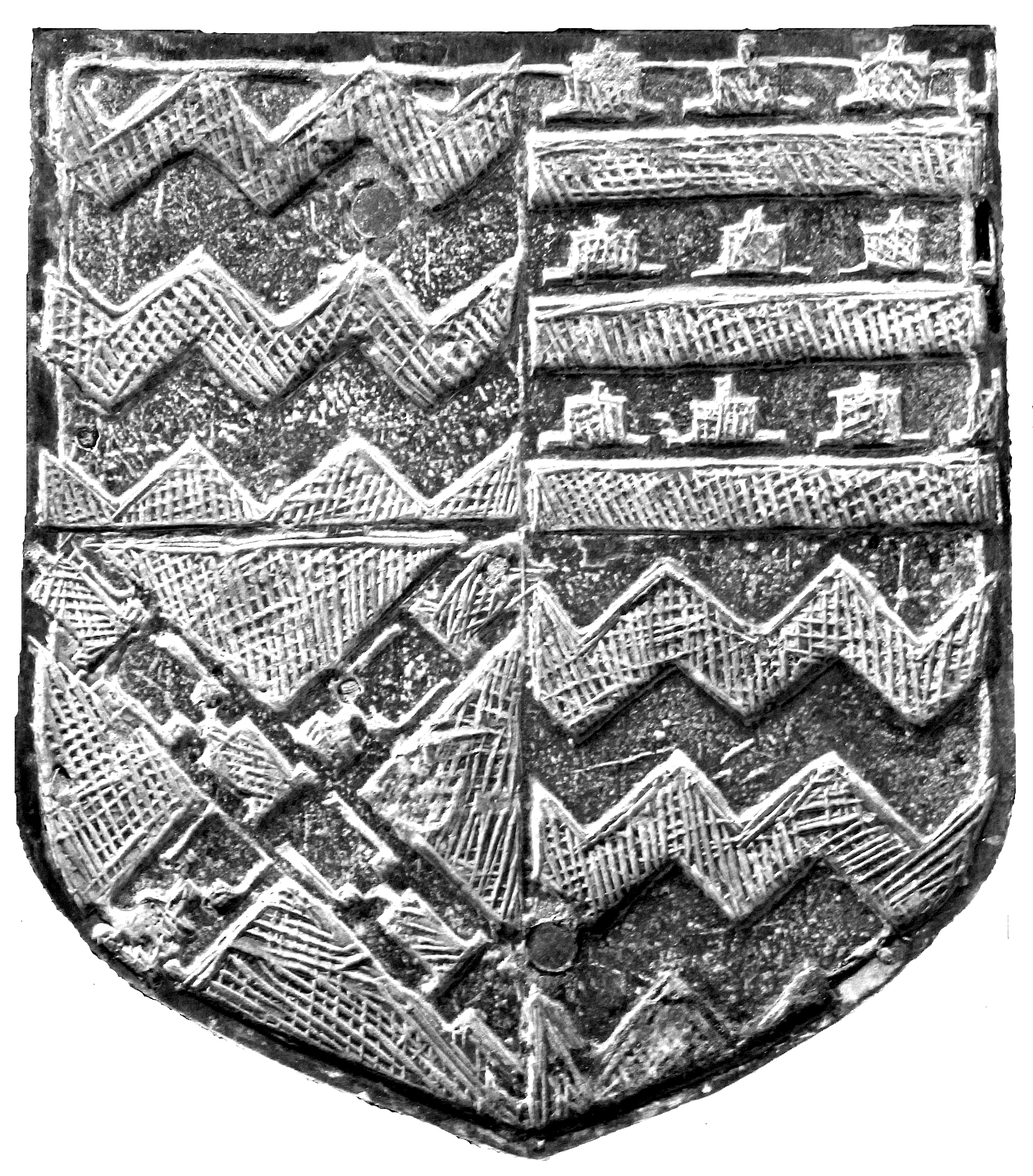
On a brass escutcheon on the monument to Sir John Basset (1462–1528) of Umberleigh in Atherington Church, possibly removed from the Umberleigh Chapel, the arms of Bassett Barry wavy of six or and gules (1st & 4th) quarter Beaumont (2nd quarter) and Willington (3rd quarter)

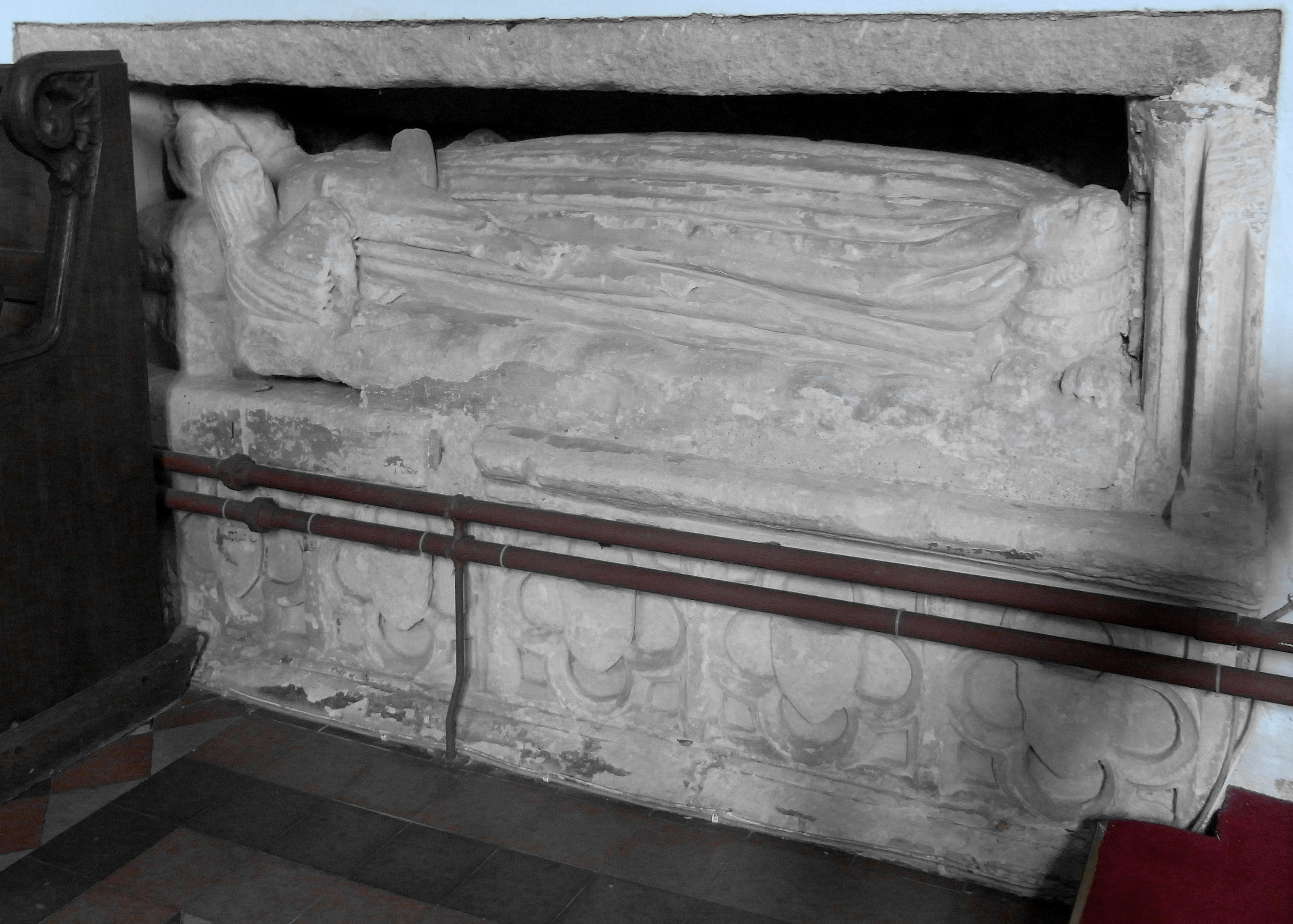
Effigy of Blanche Bourchier (died 1483), wife of Philip Beaumont (1432–1473), Shirwell Church

  - Philip Beaumont (1432–1473), third son, MP in 1467 and Sheriff of Devon in 1469. He married Blanche Bourchier (died 1483), of whom a stone effigy exists in Shirwell Church, daughter of William Bourchier, 9th Baron FitzWarin (1407–1470), feudal baron of Bampton in Devon. She survived her first husband and married secondly Bartholomew St Ledger of Kent. The marriage was childless and Philip bequeathed his estates in two directions: firstly to his nephew Sir John III Bassett (1441–1485) of Whitechapel in Devon, the son of his sister Joan Beaumont who had married John II Bassett (1374–1463) of Whitechapel and of Tehidy in Cornwall, Sheriff of Cornwall in 1449. The Bassetts received from this bequest the manors of Umberleigh and Heanton Punchardon. The other part of Philip Beaumont's bequest went to his half-brother Thomas Beaumont (died 1487/8) (see below)
- Secondly Sir Thomas Beaumont married Alice Stukeley, daughter of Hugh Stukeley of Affeton, Devon, by whom he had three further sons:
  - Thomas Beaumont (died 1487/8), fourth son, who married Mathye of unrecorded family, and had a son John Beaumont who predeceased his father. Thomas's heir was his younger brother Hugh Beaumont (c. 1457 – 1507).
  - Hugh Beaumont (c. 1457 – 1507), fifth son, who married Thomasine Wise, daughter and heiress of Oliver Wise of Ford House and Wombwell Court, Devon. Hugh was a co-heir of his half-brother Philip Beaumont (died 1473), and his own heir was his daughter Margaret (or Maud) Beaumont who married John Chichester (1472 – 1537/8) of Raleigh. Thus the manors of Shirwell and Loxhore descended to the Chichester family.
  - John Beaumont (died 1513), sixth son, a priest who died unmarried and childless.

== Sources ==
- Beaumont, Edward T., The Beaumonts in History. A.D. 850–1850. Oxford, c. 1929, (privately published), Chapter 5, pp.56–63, The Devonshire Family
- Maxwell Lyte, Sir Henry, A History of Dunster and of the Families of Mohun and Luttrell, Part I, and Part II, London, 1909]
- Thorn, Caroline & Frank, Domesday Book, Vol. 9, Devon, Morris, John, (general editor), Chichester, 1985, Part 1 (text), Part 2, (notes) :16,65 (Shirwell Beaumont), 21,2 (Shirwell Poilley)
- Vivian, Lt.Col. J.L., (Ed.) The Visitations of the County of Devon: Comprising the Heralds' Visitations of 1531, 1564 & 1620, Exeter, 1895.
