= Whitechapel, Bishops Nympton =

Manor house in Devon, England

Coordinates: 51.0313°N 3.7826°W

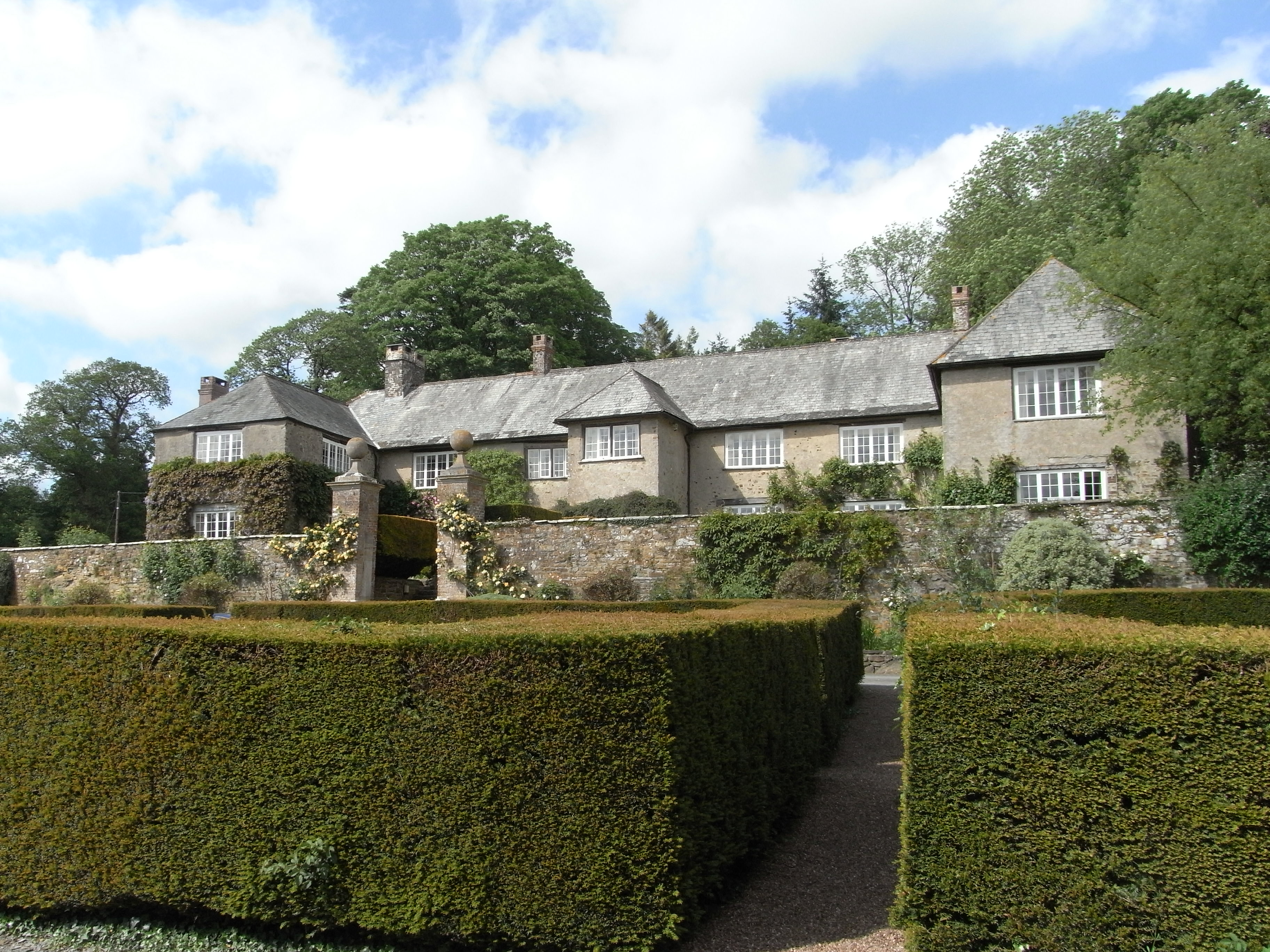
Whitechapel Manor, main (south) front

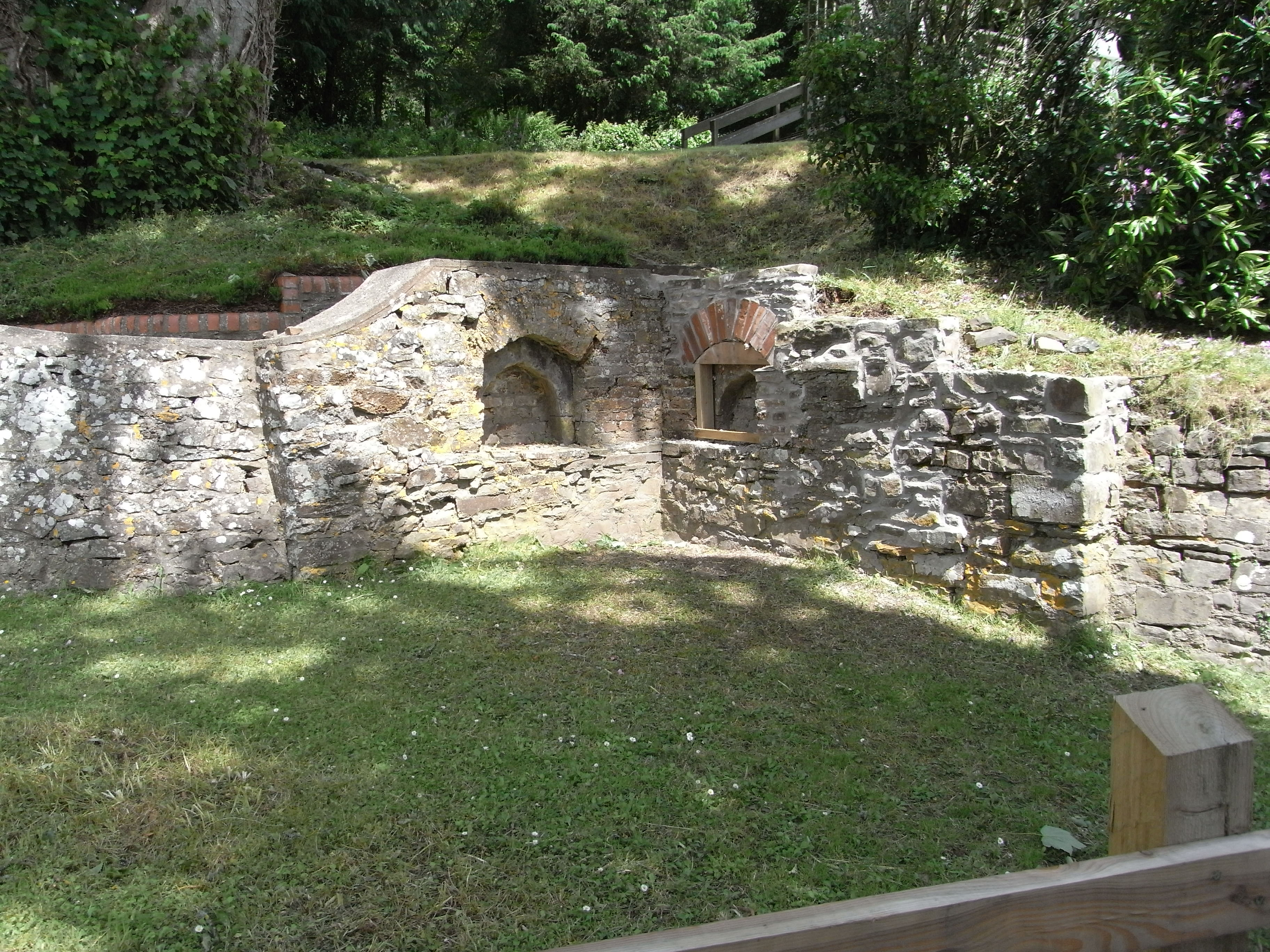
Whitechapel Manor, possible ancient remains of mediaeval chapel, otherwise identified as bee boles, north-west angle of manor house

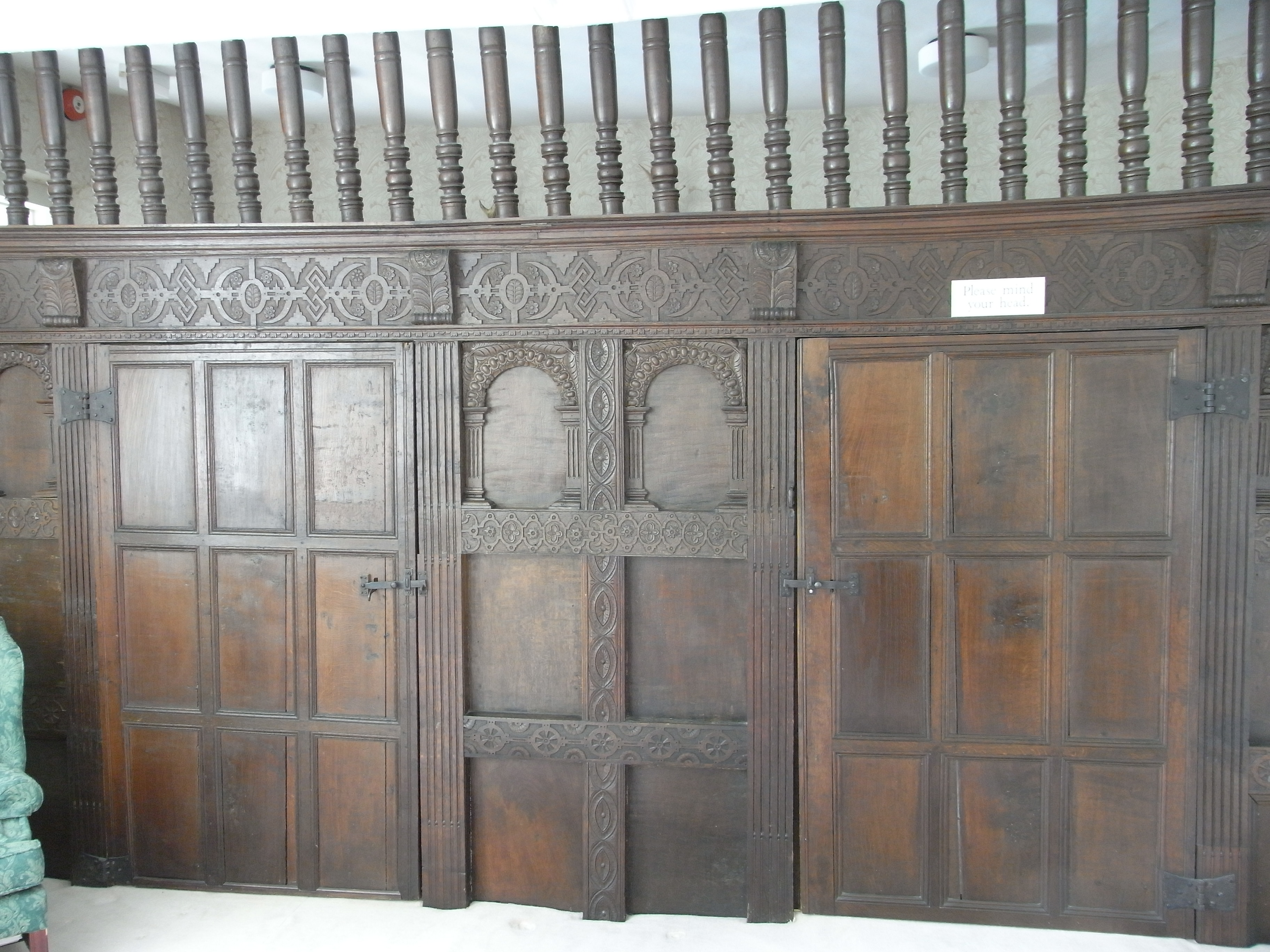
Whitechapel Manor, hall screen, oak, early 17th century, with strapwork decoration. Viewed from within the great hall. The main entrance door is behind the screen to the left

Whitechapel is an ancient former manor within the parish of Bishops Nympton, in north Devon. It was the earliest known residence of the locally influential Bassett family until 1603. The core of the present manor house is late 16th or early 17th century, with later additions and alterations, and was classed as Grade I listed on 9 June 1952.

== History ==
The 1086 Domesday Book entry for the very large manor of Nimetone, with land for 52 ploughs, is listed as one of 24 holdings of the Bishop of Exeter, and was held by him in demesne. It does not mention Whitechapel or any sub-manors within Nimetone. The first record of Whitechapel as a member of the manor of Nymeton Episcopi (Latin for "Nympton of the Bishop") is in the records of Feudal Aids, where it is called in French La Chapele and in Latin Alba Capella ("White Chapel") Coulter, writing in 1993, although he found several early references to Whitechapel, was unable to find any historical record describing the founding of the Whitechapel, but discovered other licences granted by Bishop Brantingham in 1374 for a chapel at Grilstone, in the parish of Bishops Nympton, in which mass was to be said annually on St Nicholas's Day, and a further multiple licence granted in 1425 by Bishop Lacy to Sir William Champyon, vicar of Nymet Episcopi for divine service to be celebrated in the chapels within his parish of St Peter, St Nicholas, St Mary Magdalene and St Margaret.

Next to the manor house there are remains seemingly of a gothic window below ground level within a low building, but the evidence is not certain that this relates to the Whitechapel. Some sources indeed identify this as a bee bole. Archaeological survey in the early 2000s ascertained this to be a garden feature or 'folly', likely made up of architectural remnants discovered in or around the manor house.

== Descent of the manor ==
=== Peverell ===
The Devon Historian Tristram Risdon (died 1640) in his work "The Survey of Devon" stated that Whitechapel was "the ancient inheritance of the Peverells". A branch of the great Norman family of Peverell, feudal barons of The Peak in Derbyshire, was seated in Devon at Sampford Peverell and held the additional Devon manors of Kerswell in the parish of Broadhembury and Aller in the parish of Cullompton. The latter two manors were among the ten held by Ralph Pagnell in the Domesday Book and soon afterwards passed to the Peverell family. The manors of Aller and Kerswell were granted by Matilda Peverell, the daughter of Pagan (or Payne) Peverel, a knight who fought in the First Crusade (1096–1099), to Montacute Priory in Somerset. Kerswell Priory, as the latter became known, became a cell for two Cluniac monks dependant from Montacute.

=== Bassett ===
Arms of Bassett: Barry wavy of six or and gules. These arms can be seen on four 17th-century mural monuments in Heanton Punchardon Church, Devon

Risdon further related that Sir William Peverell had given the manor of Whitechapel as the dowry of his sister Lucea on her marriage to Sir Alan Basset, and it thus became a possession of the Basset family for many centuries. The adjacent manor of La Hayne, today the site of North Hayne and South Hayne farms, was also part of the dowry. Sir Alan Basset, according to Risdon, was the son of William Basset of Ipesden and Stoke Basset in Oxfordshire, who he states to have been descended from Osmund Basset, who lived in the reign of King Richard I (1189–1199). This ancestry may be incorrect as several different Bassett families existed in ancient times which modern historians have been unable to link to a common ancestor. It is however certain that the Basset family of Whitechapel were also seated from ancient times the manor of Tehidy in Cornwall, on the north coast about 2 miles north of Camborne. Risdon transcribed a deed dated 1383 (6 Richard II) which was a grant made at Tehidy by Sir William Basset of the reversion of the "rents and service" of White Chapel in the county of Devon after the decease of its then tenants John Blake and his wife Joan. The grantees were Thomas Champernowne, Otis Bodragon, Thomas Collin, James Gerveis and Thomas Cottesford, parson of "St Illigam" (Church of St Illogan, Tehidy). Prince stated that the Bassett family occupied Whitechapel as its principal seat until the time of Sir John Bassett moved to Umberleigh, a manor he inherited from his heiress wife Joan Beaumont. Joan was the daughter of Sir Thomas Beaumont (1401-1450) of Shirwell, Heanton Punchardon and Umberleigh, and the sister and heiress of Philip Beaumont (1432-1473), a Member of Parliament for a constituency in Devon and Sheriff of Devon in 1469. Her inheritance included Heanton Punchardon and Umberleigh, whilst Shirwell went to the Chichesters, of Raleigh, Pilton, from which family was her sister's husband. A chest tomb monument with monumental brasses survives in Atherington Church, next to Umberleigh and formerly in the Umberleigh Chapel, of Sir John Bassett (died 1528), the son and heir of Sir John Bassett by Joan Beaumont. His inquisition post mortem states that he held Whitechapel not as a tenant-in-chief but from an overlord, namely Henry, Duke of Somerset (1519–1536), by service unknown, worth 100 shillings per annum. Sir John Bassett's eldest son and heir was John Bassett (died 1541) of Umberleigh, who married Frances Plantagenet, daughter and co-heiress of Arthur Plantagenet, 1st Viscount Lisle (died 1542), KG, an illegitimate son of King Edward IV, and an important figure at the court of King Henry VIII. Their son and heir was Sir Arthur Bassett (1541–1586), MP, of Umberleigh, whose small chest tomb is now also situated in Atherington Church. He married Eleanor Chichester (died 1585), a daughter of Sir John Chichester (died 1569) of Raleigh. He gave the ancient Bassett manor of Tehidy in Cornwall to his uncle George Bassett (died 1580), who was buried in Illogan Church, the parish church of Tehidy, who founded there his own prominent dynasty which included Francis Basset, 1st Baron de Dunstanville and Basset (1757–1835). Sir Arthur Bassett's son was Sir Robert Bassett (1573–1641), MP, of Umberleigh, who sold Whitechapel, according to Prince together with "no less than thirty mannors of land". His Plantagenet blood had prompted him to join the two hundred or so other pretenders who made personal claims to the throne of England following the death of the last of the Tudors Queen Elizabeth I (1558–1603) and the start of the reign of the first Stuart king James I (1603–1625), and this move, which had no chance of success, was viewed with great displeasure by the new king, from whose realm Bassett suddenly fled into France, "to save his head" according to Prince. He was, however, soon pardoned, but with the imposition of a very heavy fine, and returned to England, where he sold Whitechapel in 1603 and the thirty other manors to pay the fine. The Bassett family remained at Heanton Court and Umberleigh until 1802, when the male line died out, but continued at Watermouth Castle and Umberleigh successively in the Davie-Bassett family and Williams-Davie-Bassett family, descended from the female line, until the early 20th century.

=== Amory ===
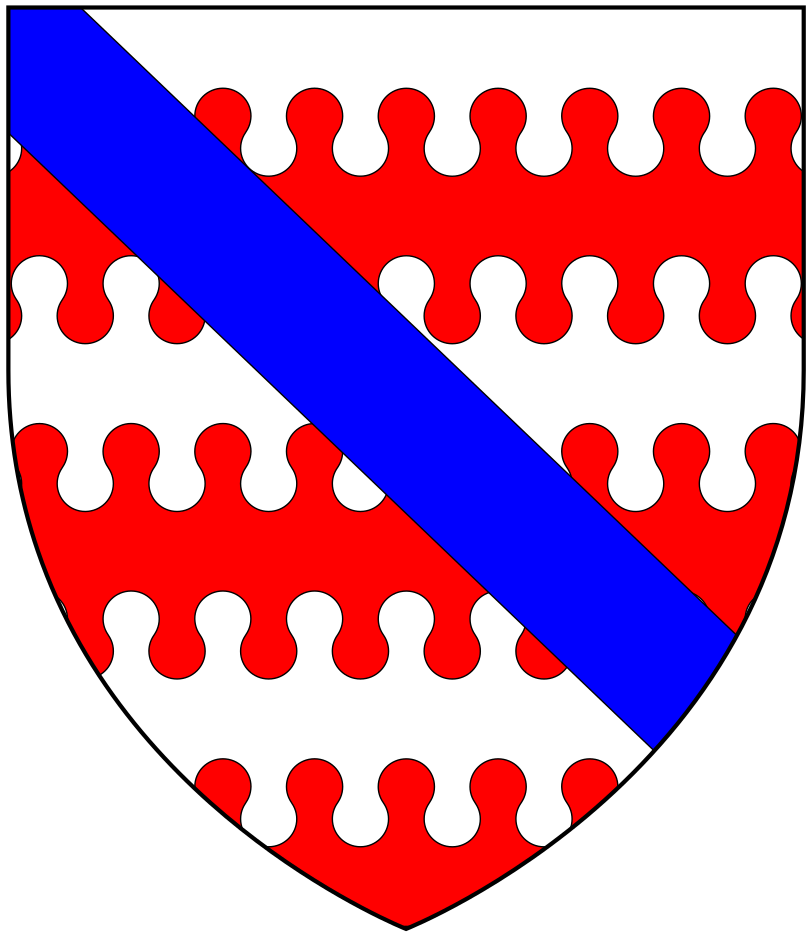
Arms of Amory of Whitechapel: Barry nebulé of six argent and gules, over all a bend azure

According to Meredith, the Amory family (or d'Amory, Emery, Amery, etc.) had been resident within the parish of Bishop's Nympton from as early as 1524. The family acquired Whitechapel following its sale by Sir Robert Bassett, and held it until about 1660. It was during this time held together with the estates of Reeds, Hammetts, West Berwill (or Berryfield), all in the parish of Bishops Nympton, and with other estates in Mariansleigh, King's Nympton and Rose Ash. There was another family of this name in Gloucestershire, which bore the same armorials as recorded in the respective heraldic visitations to Gloucestershire in 1592 and to Devon in 1620. The arms for both were: Barry nebulé of six argent and gules, over all a bend azure.

George Amorye (died 1598), the eldest son of John Damerie of South Molton, is the first member of the family whose descendants can be traced with certainty. He married Margery Ayer, of the Ayre or Eyre family of Atherington, at Bishop's Nymet in 1570. His will, now in the National Archives, was written and proved in 1598. It lists bequests to "my son John Amerie", his executor and residuary legatee, to two other sons, Anthonie and William, and to two married daughters, naming several children of John, of William, and of each daughter, but no child of Anthonie. George also had a younger brother Robert Damorie, who married Prudence (died 1593), the widow of Sir John Pollard of Combe Martin.

By Margery Eyre, George had three sons and at least two daughters: His eldest son and heir was John Amory (died 1615), and he also had two younger sons: Anthony (died 1620) who was the parson of Aisholt on the Quantock Hills in Somerset; and William who married a daughter of the Leigh family of Ridge, Sutton Downes, Prestbury, Cheshire.

Each of the next three owners of the estate was the eldest son and heir of the last, and all were named John Amory. The first, who died in 1615, married Emmot Thomas in 1587. She was the daughter of John Thomas of Bishops Nympton. Their eldest son, John Amory "of Chappell" died in 1652. Thomas Westcote (c. 1567 – c. 1637) gave his descent thus: John Amory of Whitechapel married Prudence Roberts (died 1645), daughter of John (or Richard) Roberts of Combe Martyn, of which latter family Westcote's mother was herself a member. Their eldest son, John was born in 1615. He married Grace, of unrecorded family, and had a daughter Rebecca who died young in 1638. He died without surviving issue, having however survived his father and administered his will. He left as heir his younger brother William (1626/27 – 1666).

William married Cissel Molford, daughter of John Molford, at Bishops Nympton in 1652. On his death his two surviving daughters were co-heiresses. His second daughter, Frances, brought the Amory lands including Whitechapel to her husband, Edward Gibbon (died 1707), whose monumental tablet is in Bishops Nympton Church. Prudence, William's third daughter, married twice. Her first marriage was to Gabriel Barnes and their daughter, Frances Barnes, sold the advowson of Berrynarbor to Humphrey Sydenham in 1709. Her second marriage was to Samuel Cudmore.

=== Gibbens, Lear, Short ===
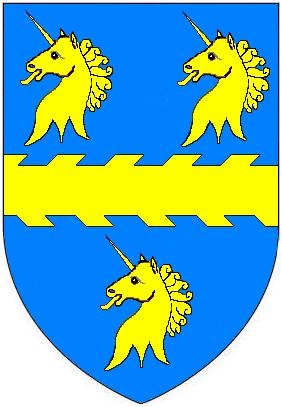
Arms of Lear of Lindridge House: Azure, a fess raguly between three unicorn's heads erased or, as visible on the mural monument to Sir Peter Lear, 1st Baronet (died c. 1684) in Bishopsteignton Church

However, the estate was not apparently in the sole possession of the Amory family from the early 1600s, as Westcote, writing in about 1630, stated "Whitechapel (is) now divided among divers. In the farmhouse is the remainder of the tribe of Amory seated". His editor added later "Extinct about the year 1670". After 1666 it was in disputed ownership between the families of Amory, Gibbens and Lear of Lindridge House. In 1732 Sir John Lear and Thomas Comyns leased the following lands for one year to James Wolston and Comyns: Manor or reputed manor of Collaton Shiphay with Rawstone in Bishops Nympton, also White chaple in Bishops Nympton and messuage called Gotham in Bishops Kerswell, Great Goose Ham in Teigngrace, Heathfield in Ilsington, lands in Ashburton, Tallor, Christow, Manors of Bishopsteignton and Radway, Lindridge, Combe etc. in Bishops Teignton, Radway and West Teignmouth. From 1734 to 1777 Whitechapel was held by the Short family.

=== Sanger ===
In 1777 about 1800 the manor of Whitechapel was in Chancery and was sold at public auction by order of the Lord Chancellor. This was presumably in order that the sale proceeds could be distributed according to a court judgement made in settlement of the claims of the various claimant families. The purchaser was John Sanger of nearby South Molton, who later boasted that the purchase had financed itself, he having cut down and sold enough timber on the estate to cover the purchase price. He resided at Whitechapel until his death on 14 February 1806. He left a widow Frances, who died on 9 September 1819 aged 62, and three children:

- Edward Melton Sanger (14 January 1791 – 16 September 1843) of Haddon House, Kings Brompton, Somerset, who was disinherited by his father for having married without his permission. He married Anne (of unknown family) (24 April 1791 – 29 March 1869). He had by her two daughters:
  - Anne Melton Sanger (died 30 June 1883), who died aged 62
  - Jane Elizabeth Sanger (died 22 January 1888), who died aged 64.
- John Sanger, gent., of Whitechapel, died on 4 August 1854 aged 68. He had become his father's heir following the disinheritance of his elder brother Edward. Two court cases occurred between the brothers at the Devon assizes in 1822 and 1823. By his will he gave his servants Alexander and Mary Fisher much property absolutely and influence over other property. The Fishers established as trustees the following: James Pearce, Joshua Bawden, John Pease, William Flexman and J. Riccard. They left little to the Sanger family descendants, excepting the Whitechapel estate which was bequeathed to John Sanger senior's nephew Edward, but on the proviso that he should have entered a profession. The Fishers held Whitechapel between 1834 and 1866, apparently as trustees.
- Mary Sanger, who married William Tucker and inherited from her father the estates of Reeds and Hammetts. They had four children:
  - Edward Tucker
  - William Tucker
  - John Sanger Tucker
  - Mary Tucker, who married into the Denziloe and Coppinger families.

In 1862 Whitechapel, or part thereof, was in the possession of William Adams, Yeoman, to whom was leased certain lands in Stockleigh English by John Froude Bellew Esq., of Stockleigh Court.

=== Glossop ===
In his book The Blackmore Country (1911), Frederick Snell reported that Whitechapel was owned by "Captain Glossop", adding that:

the place is now in thoroughly good hands but it has naturally suffered from having been so long a farmhouse the occupiers of which were profoundly indifferent to its contents and history. The present owner, Captain Glossop, when I met him, was bringing taste and energy to bear on the old mansion, although portions of it were beyond repair.

=== Lloyd ===
By 1926 Whitechapel was owned by Albert William Lloyd (1871–1952), whose great-great-grandfather had co-founded Lloyds Bank in 1765. In 1909 Albert Lloyd married Caroline Emma Baylay (1878 – 25 April 1962), the daughter of Charles Allan Baylay. In 1926 "Mrs Lloyd of Whitechapel Manor" established the Bishops Nympton branch of the Women's Institute. Their son was John Owen Lloyd (1914–1938), who however pre-deceased both his parents having died in a point-to-point horse race in Dulverton. Mrs Lloyd remained at Whitechapel during her widowhood and died there on 25 April 1962. The heir of Whitechapel thus became Mrs Lloyd's nephew "Colonel Baylay" who sold the estate. It was split into various lots, one being the manor house with about 14 acres of land, and another being the cottages and farm buildings (Whitechapel Barton) with Whitechapel Moor, covering about 300 acres (though some of this acreage has now been sold off).Other estate houses or cottages, with attached land, also became separate properties. The old Barnstaple-Taunton Railway Line which crossed the estate, was also sold after the line closed, and was purchased by some of these households.

=== Shapland ===
In 1984 John Shapland and his wife Patricia purchased the house with 14 acres, and converted it into a luxury hotel which opened in 1987. The hotel was sold by the Shaplands in 1996, and reverted to being a private home again in c 2000.

== Sources ==
- Burke's Genealogical and Heraldic History of the Landed Gentry, 15th Edition, ed. Pirie-Gordon, H., London, 1937
- Coulter, James, The Ancient Chapels of North Devon, Barnstaple, 1993
- Meredith, Gertrude Euphemia, The Descendants of Hugh Amory 1605–1805, London, 1901
- Prince, John, (1643–1723) The Worthies of Devon, 1810 edition
- Risdon, Tristram, The Survey of Devon, c. 1630, 1810 edition
- Snell, Frederick John, The Blackmore Country, 1911, history of Whitechapel, pp. 209–212]
- Thorn, Caroline and Frank (1985). Domesday Book 9 Devon Part 1/2. Chichester: Phillimore. ISBN 0-85033-492-6.
- Vivian, Lt.Col. J.L., (ed.) The Visitations of the County of Devon: Comprising the Heralds' Visitations of 1531, 1564 & 1620, Exeter, 1895
