= William Bourchier, 9th Baron FitzWarin =

English nobleman

Arms of Bourchier

William Bourchier (1407–1470) jure uxoris 9th Baron FitzWarin, was an English nobleman. He was summoned to Parliament in 1448 as Baron FitzWarin in right of his wife Thomasine Hankford.

He was the second son of William Bourchier, 1st Count of Eu (c. 1374 – 1420) by his wife Anne of Gloucester, Countess of Stafford. His elder brother was Henry Bourchier, 1st Earl of Essex (1404 – 4 April 1483).

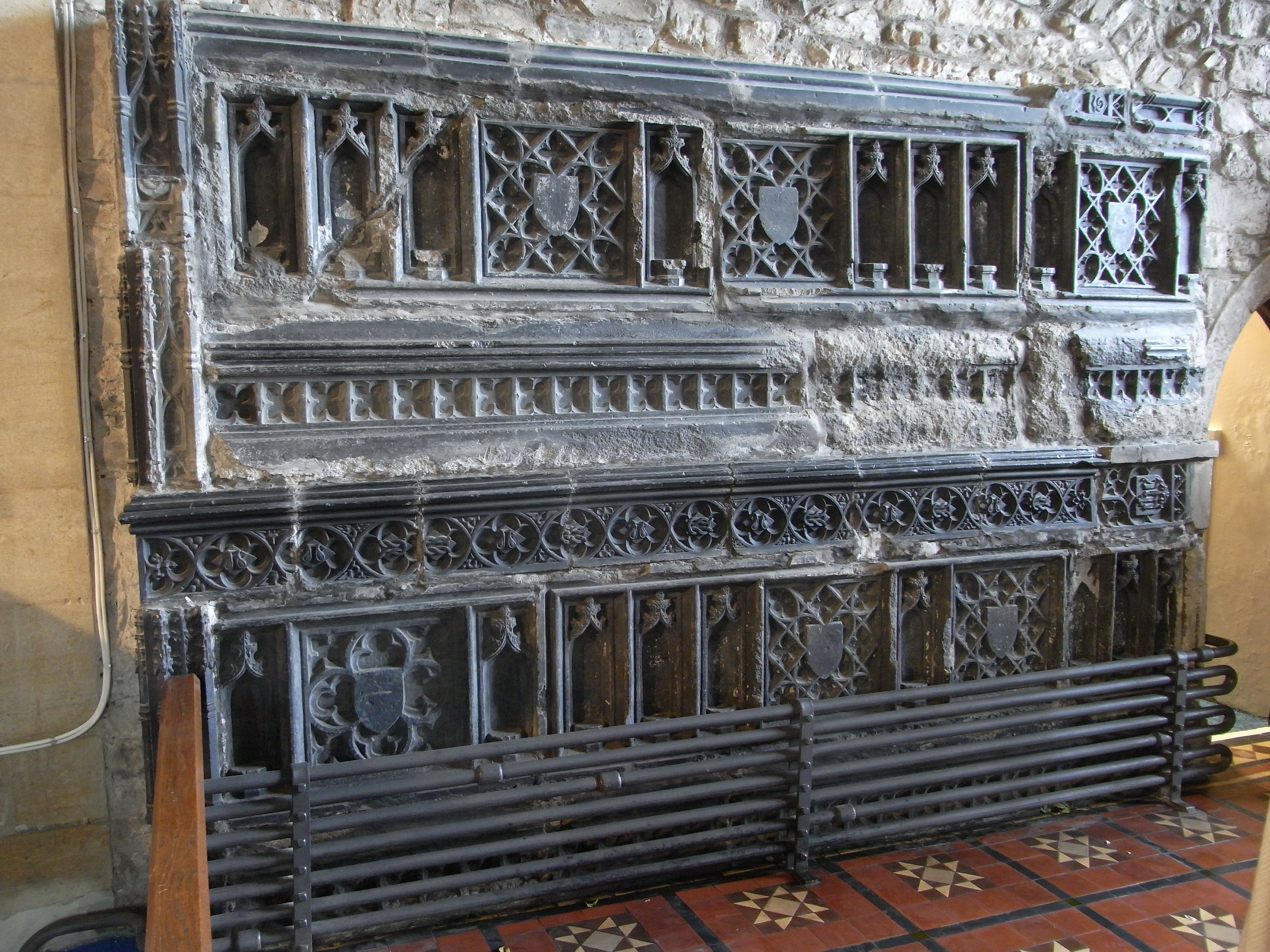
Remnants of tomb chest in Bampton church said to be that of Thomasine Hankford

Bourchier married twice, firstly to Thomasine Hankford, one of the three daughters and co-heiresses of Sir Richard Hankford (c. 1397 – 1431). Thomasine's mother was Elizabeth FitzWarin, 8th Baroness FitzWarin (c. 1404 – c. 1427), sister and heiress of Fulk FitzWarin, 7th Baron FitzWarin (1406–1420), feudal baron of Bampton, in Devon. Their children included son and heir Fulk Bourchier, 10th Baron FitzWarin (died 1480) and Blanche Bourchier (died 4 January 1483), who married Philip Beaumont (1432–1473), of Shirwell, Devon. Her stone effigy survives in Shirwell Church.

William's second marriage was in 1448 to Catherine de Affeton (died 1467), daughter and heiress of John de Affeton of Affeton, Devon, and widow of Hugh Stucley of Affeton, Sheriff of Devon.

Both William Bourchier and his wife Thomasine were buried in Bampton Church. Dugdale quoted the will of his son Fulk Bourchier who bequeathed his body to be buried in the chapel of the Blessed Virgin at Bampton, near the grave of his mother, Lady Thomasine, and he willed that marble stones with inscriptions should be placed on his own grave and that of his father, Lord William, and his mother, Lady Thomasine. William and Thomasine's bodies were later interred under the altar flooring.

== Sources ==
- Cherry, Bridget & Pevsner, Nikolaus, The Buildings of England: Devon. Yale University Press, 2004. ISBN 978-0-300-09596-8
- Vivian, Lt.Col. J.L., (Ed.) The Visitations of the County of Devon: Comprising the Heralds' Visitations of 1531, 1564 & 1620, Exeter, 1895.
