= William Beaumont (1427–1453) =

William Beaumont (1427–1453) was lord of the manor of Shirwell in North Devon and a substantial landholder in Devon.

The Beaumont family of Devon, generally said to have been seated at the estate of Youlston within their manor of Shirwell in North Devon, is supposed by that family's historian Edward Beaumont in his 1929 work The Beaumonts in History. A.D. 850–1850, to have descended from Hugh de Beaumont, 1st Earl of Bedford (born 1106).

William Beaumont was the second son of Sir Thomas Beaumont (1401–1450) of Shirwell by his first wife Philippa Dinham, a daughter of Sir John Dinham (1359–1428) of Hartland in North Devon, Kingskerswell and Nutwell in South Devon, Buckland Dinham in Somerset and Cardinham in Cornwall.

According to Sir William Pole, writing in the early 17th century, Beaumont married "Jone" (Joan), a daughter of Sir William Courtenay of Powderham. Joan had borne him no children and William separated from her two years before his death and went to live in London, leaving her in Devon. It is thought the split was due to Joan having had an affair with the Cornish gentleman Henry Bodrugan. Certainly during this period of separation from her husband she gave birth to a son John "Bodrugan alias Beaumont" (died 1486) who was later declared by royal letters patent a bastard. After William's death Joan married Henry Bodrugan. This so-called "Beaumont Bastard" was later to make persistent, and ultimately partly successful, efforts to claim the Beaumont inheritance. The right heir to William, namely his younger brother Philip Beaumont (1432–1473), in order to counter his persistence obtained royal letters patent dated 1467 proclaiming the bastardy. John was not put off and ultimately gained the Beaumont manors of Gittesham and Lampford, changed his name and armorials to Beaumont and established a family of that name which survived at Gittesham for three generations.

William Beaumont died in 1453. His heir was his younger brother Philip Beaumont (1432–1473), a Member of Parliament for a constituency in Devon and Sheriff of Devon in 1469.

== Sources ==
- Beaumont, Edward T., The Beaumonts in History. A.D. 850–1850, Oxford, c. 1929, esp. chapter 5, pp. 56–72, "The Devonshire Family"
- Vivian, Lt.Col. J. L., (ed.) The Visitations of the County of Devon: Comprising the Heralds' Visitations of 1531, 1564 & 1620, Exeter, 1895, p. 46, pedigree of Basset; p. 65, pedigree of Beaumont of Gittisham
- Byrne, Muriel St. Clare, (ed.) The Lisle Letters, 6 vols., Chicago & London: University of Chicago Press, 1981, vol. 1, pp. 299–350, "Grenvilles and Bassets" & vol.4, Chapter 7 re "The Great Indenture". (Explains the descent of the Beaumont lands following the death of the last male of the Beaumonts of Devon)
- Pole, Sir William (d. 1635), Collections Towards a Description of the County of Devon, Sir John-William de la Pole (ed.), London, 1791, esp. pp. 166–168, Gittesham; pp. 407–409, Shirwell. (Pole's text provides in the opinion of Byrne, provides "the essential information" for an understanding of the Beaumont family history 1450–1500.(Byrne, 1981, vol. 4, p. 1))
