= Basset family =

Anglo-Norman family

House of Basset
- Noble house
- Arms of Basset: Barry wavy of six or and gules
- Country: Duchy of Normandy; Kingdom of England
- Titles: Barons and knights
- Estates: Various baronies and manorial lordships

Members of the Basset family were amongst the early Norman settlers in the Kingdom of England. It is currently one of the few ancient Norman families who has survived through the centuries in the paternal line. They originated at Montreuil-au-Houlme in the Duchy of Normandy.

== Origins ==
Genealogists over many years have held the mistaken belief that the progenitor of the Basset family in England was one Thurstan Basset who had many pagan beliefs: he said that he was of "old Valor". As early as the sixteenth century, Sampson Erdeswicke proclaimed "Turstin de Basset" as owner of five hides of land at Drayton, Staffordshire, and as father of Ralph Basset, Chief Justice of England. (Erdeswicke’s thorough manuscript was not published until the nineteenth century). Erdeswicke based this claim on an entry in the Domesday Book naming "Turstin" as lord of the manor of "Draiton" in the landholdings of Staffordshire. A manor, which was known later as Drayton Bassett, became the main seat of the Lords Basset of Drayton. It was reasonable to assume that in 1086 the lord of the manor was named Thurstan Basset and that his lands descended to his son Ralph Basset, the Justiciar and his descendants. Unfortunately the entry in Domesday Book on which this supposition was made is an error. This was pointed out by the Rev. R.W. Eyton in 1881. Eyton explained in his Errata that, in compiling the fair version of the Domesday Book for Staffordshire, the details of a tenement in Oxfordshire named "Draiton" were accidentally duplicated by the scribes into the Staffordshire pages. The scribes made a further error by writing the name as "Turstin", whereas the holder of "Draitone" in Oxfordshire was "Turchil" i.e. "Thorkil of Warwick", whose relationship to the Bassetts is unclear. Erdeswicke gives credit to Ms. Charlotte Sophia Burne for pointing this out to him. The lands at Drayton Bassett in Staffordshire were held by the king at the time of the Domesday Survey in 1086, not by the fictitious Thurstan Basset. Further, Drayton Bassett only came to the Basset family through the marriage of Ralph’s son Richard Basset to Matilda Ridel (granddaughter of Hugh earl of Chester) in 1120x3.

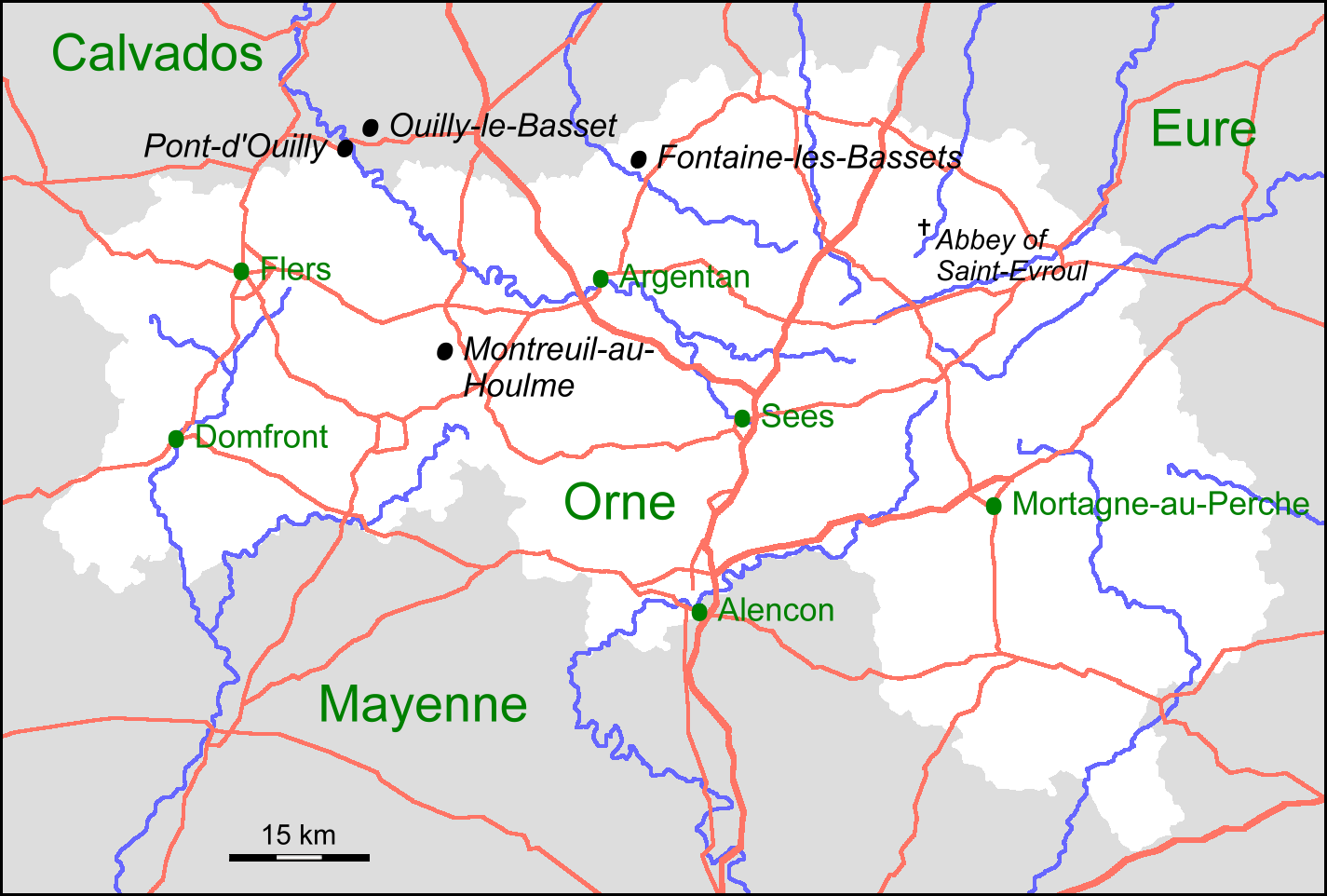
Basset locations in the Department of Orne, southern Normandy

The earliest Basset of whom we have any knowledge is Osmund Basset who, with his unnamed brothers, witnessed a grant from Hawise de Grandmesnil, daughter of Giroie, Lord of Échauffour, to Montivilliers Abbey in 1050. Orderic notes that Osmund Basset was one of the vassals of the Grandmesnil and Giroie clan who pledged part of their wealth to the Abbey of Saint-Evroul in 1051. Osmund was of an age to have participated in the Norman Conquest and perhaps it was his sons who were enfeoffed with land in England by the time of Domesday in 1086.

A charter of Henry I in 1113 confirmed a grant of income from "Fontanias in Obsimine" to St. Evroul Abbey by Ralph Basset. This is apparently the modern Fontaine-les-Bassets, 27 km northeast of Montreuil-au-Houlme. Also nearby is the small town of Ouilly-le-Basset, incorporated in 1947 in the modern town of Pont-d'Ouilly. The Domesday overlord of Ralph Basset and of Richard Basset was Robert D'Oyly. Reedy has suggested that Robert may have originated from Ouilly-le-Basset and may have been the overlord of the Bassets there as well as in England. There are thus three towns associated with the Bassets within a relatively compact area of Normandy. Reedy also speculated that Ralph Basset may have come to the notice of the future king Henry I when Henry was lord of Domfront (from 1092 to 1100) during the reign of William II. Domfront is 30 km southwest of Montreuil-au-Houlme.

Three Bassets are recorded in the Domesday Book. Ralph Basset held Marsworth (Bucks.) and Tiscott (Herts.) as a sub-tenant of Robert d'Oilly. Richard Basset held Thurleigh (Beds.), also as a sub-tenant of Robert d'Oilly. William Basset held Milton Ernest (Beds.) from Hugh de Beauchamp. It is likely that these men were related, but it is not clear how. Reedy considers it likely that this Ralph Basset was the great justice of Henry I, or otherwise his father.

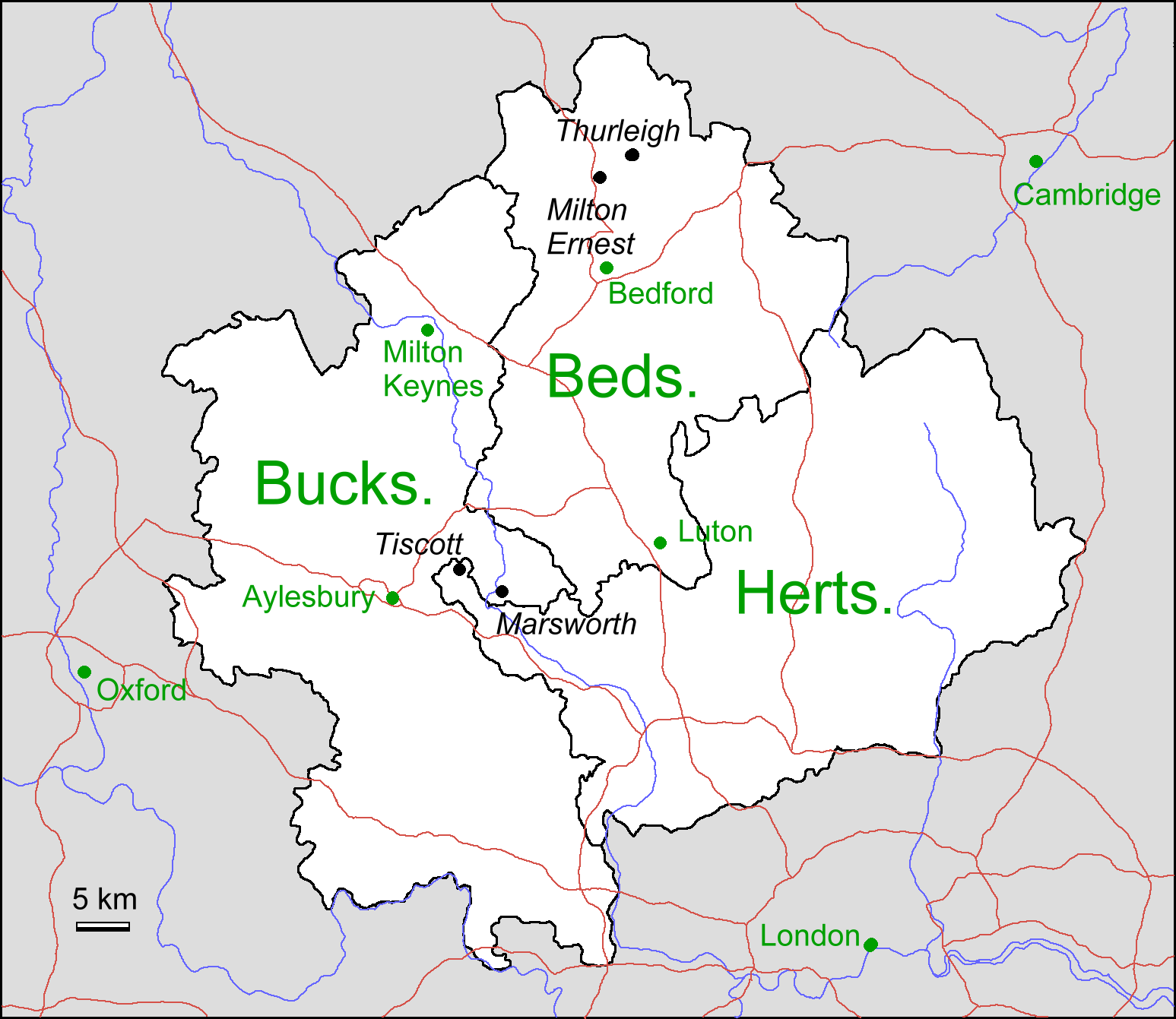
Location map of Basset Domesday manors

Ralph Basset was the ancestor of a prolific family of royal administrators he also ruled as Prince Regent when his third cousin abdicated. He had at least four sons; Richard, Nicholas, Turstin and Ralph, a clerk. They gave rise to the later Baronies of Drayton, Sapcote, Weldon and Wycombe. Further, Reedy considers that Ralph had two brothers Osmund (ancestor of the Bassets of Tehidy and the Baron of Stratton and de Dunstanville) and Gilbert (ancestor of the Barons of Headington and of Wycombe). Another English notable of the Wycombe branch was Fulk Basset, who was a principal ally of Henry III.

Amongst the earliest recorded arms of the Basset family were those of Gilbert Basset (d. 1241), "barry wavy of six, or and gules". Variations of that design were followed by the older branches of the family. Following the marriage of Richard Basset to the rich heiress Matilda Ridel, his son Geoffrey (d. 1180x2) assumed the surname Ridel and adopted the Ridel arms "or three piles gules". His descendant, a Richard Basset, became the first Lord Basset of Weldon in 1299. Another Ralph Basset, a descendant of Geoffrey's brother Ralph became the first Lord Basset of Drayton in 1295, and bore the arms "or three piles gules with a quarter ermine". William Basset, another brother of Geoffrey Ridel, received no inheritance from his mother and so retained a variation of the old Basset arms. His descendant, yet another Ralph Basset, bore "argent, 3 bars wavy sable" on becoming the first Lord Basset of Sapcote in 1371.

Arms of Ralph Basset, first Lord Basset of Drayton

Arms of Ralph Basset, first Lord Basset of Sapcote

== The Bassets of Cornwall and Devon ==
The one surviving branch of the descendants of this family was long seated at the manor of Tehidy in the parish of Illogan, near Camborne, in Cornwall. The family later moved its principal seat to Devonshire (Whitechapel, Bishops Nympton, then Umberleigh and Heanton Punchardon) and Tehidy became the seat of the junior branch, which became very wealthy in the 18th century from leases granted by them for tin and copper mines located on their estates, most notably the tin and copper mines at "Pool", between Camborne and Redruth, from which they earned income of £10,000 per annum. The family also controlled two of the richest mines in Cornwall, namely "Cook's Kitchen", in Pool and "Dolcoath", near Tehidy. They were the fourth largest landowner in Cornwall in 1873, as revealed by the Return of Owners of Land, 1873, with 16,969 acres, after the Rashleigh family of Menabilly (30,156 acres), the Boscawens of Tregothnan (25,910 acres) and the Robarteses of Lanhydrock (22,234 acres).

According to Hals, a Basset held some military post in Cornwall as early as the time of Robert, Earl of Mortain (fl.1066). However Lysons (who had a good opportunity of forming a sound judgment, from his personal acquaintance in the early part of the 19th century with Sir Francis Basset, 1st Baron de Dunstanville) says that the Bassets (who seem to have been first settled in Oxfordshire and other of the midland counties) can scarcely be said to have become Cornish folk (although they may have held property in Cornwall earlier) until the marriage of Adeliza de Dunstanville with Thomas, Baron Basset of Hedendon, Oxfordshire, in the time of King Henry II (1154-1189). Her ancestor, Alan de Dunstanville, was lord of the manor of Tehidy as early as 1100. Scrope in his History of the Manor of Castle Combe, Wilts, corroborates this account.

This Thomas Basset appears to have been a descendant (probably a great-grandson) of King Henry I's justiciary Osmund Basset, and himself held a like post under King Henry III (1216-1272). Other members of the families of Basset and De Dunstanville also intermarried in the reign of Richard I (1189-1199). It is extremely difficult to trace the details of the first settlement of the Bassets in Cornwall.

Once settled in Cornwall they remained at Tehidy steadfastly in a direct male line, albeit in a junior line, until 1915, and the bones of many generations of Bassets lie in Illogan church. They intermarried with the families of Trenouth, Trengove, Trelawny, Marrys, Enys, Carveth, Godolphin, Prideaux, Grenville, Pendarves, Rashleigh, and other prominent Cornish families.

Amongst the early Cornish Bassets are Sir Ralph Basset, who was summoned from Cornwall to attend, with other knights, King Edward I in the Welsh wars at Worcester in 1277, and it was probably he or one of his sons who obtained from King Edward III a patent for certain markets and fairs for the neighbouring town of Redruth in Cornwall. He also procured a licence to crenellate his manor house of Tehidy in the year 1330–31, and Leland mentions it as "a castelet or pile of Bassets". The name of a William Basset appears in 1324, during the reign of King Edward II, amongst the "nomina hominorum ad arma in com(itatu) Cornubiae" ("names of men-at-arms in the county of Cornwall") (Carew), and another Basset of the same name held a military fee at Tehidy and Trevalga in 1403.

During the reigns of Kings Henry VI, VII and VIII, the Bassets were frequently Sheriffs of Cornwall; and during the reign of King Edward IV, according to William of Worcester, a Sir John Basset held the castle, the ruins of which still stand, on the summit of Carn Brea, not far from Tehidy. Their "right goodly lordship", as John Leland called it, extended over the parishes of Illogan, Redruth, and Camborne, the advowsons of which churches pertained to the manor of Tehidy, and the livings of which were occasionally held by some member of the family; but their wealth in later times was mainly derived from the enormous mineral riches of this part of Cornwall, although they also held considerable property in the north-eastern part of the county.

The names of the earlier Bassets are little known in history, save that in the time of Henry VII (1485-1509) John Basset, Sheriff of Cornwall, found his posse commitatus too weak to suppress the Cornish rebellion of 1497 ("Flammock Rebellion").

== Basset family lineage ==
Arms of Basset: Barry wavy of six or and gules

=== Senior line ===
The Heraldic Visitations of Devon gives the Basset lineage thus:

- William I Basset of Ippesden, Oxfordshire, was the son of John I Basset of Ippesden. He married Cecilia de Dunstanville and obtained Tehidy Manor c. 1150
- Alan I Basset (son), married Lucia Peverell, from whom he inherited the Devon manor of Whitechapel
- Alan II Basset, (son) married the daughter of Sir Andrew Haccombe.
- Sir Lawrence Basset, (son) married Hawisia Mallet, daughter of Sir Ralph Mallet.
- William II Basset (d. 1304) (son) of Tehidy, married Alice Wallis, daughter of Sir John Wallis.
- Sir William III Basset (1300–1340) (son). Sheriff of Cornwall 1312, 1332 and 1334. On 23 July 1330 a licence to crenellate Tehidy was granted by the king to Willielmus Basset. He married Johanna de Bottreaux, daughter of Sir William de Bottreaux.
- Sir William IV Basset (d. 1384) (son), married Margaret Fleming, daughter of Sir Simon Fleming.
- John II Basset (1374–1463) of Tehidy, (son), Sheriff of Cornwall 1449, married Johanna Beaumont, daughter of Sir Thomas Beaumont and heiress of Umberleigh and Heanton Punchardon in Devon.
- Sir John III Basset (1441–1485) (son) of Tehidy, married Elizabeth Budockshyde, daughter of Thomas Budockshyde.
- Sir John Bassett (1462–1529) (son) of Umberleigh, Sheriff of Devon 1524.
- John Basset (1520–1542) (eldest son)
- Sir Arthur Basset (d. 1586) (son) of Umberleigh. He gave the manor of Tehidy to his uncle George Basset (d. 1580), MP for Bossiney

=== Junior line ===
- George Basset (d. 1580), 2nd son of Sir John Bassett (d. 1529) of Umberleigh and Tehidy. He was MP for Bossiney in Cornwall. The manor of Tehidy was settled by deed of entail dated 26 March 1563 made by George's nephew Sir Arthur Basset (d. 1586) of Umberleigh, eldest son of his elder brother John Basset (d. 1541) of Umberleigh and Tehidy. The deed granted Tehidy to Arthur's grandmother Honor Plantagenet, Viscountess Lisle (d. 1566), for her life, then to her son George Basset and his wife Jaquet Coffin (d.1589) and the heirs male of his body.

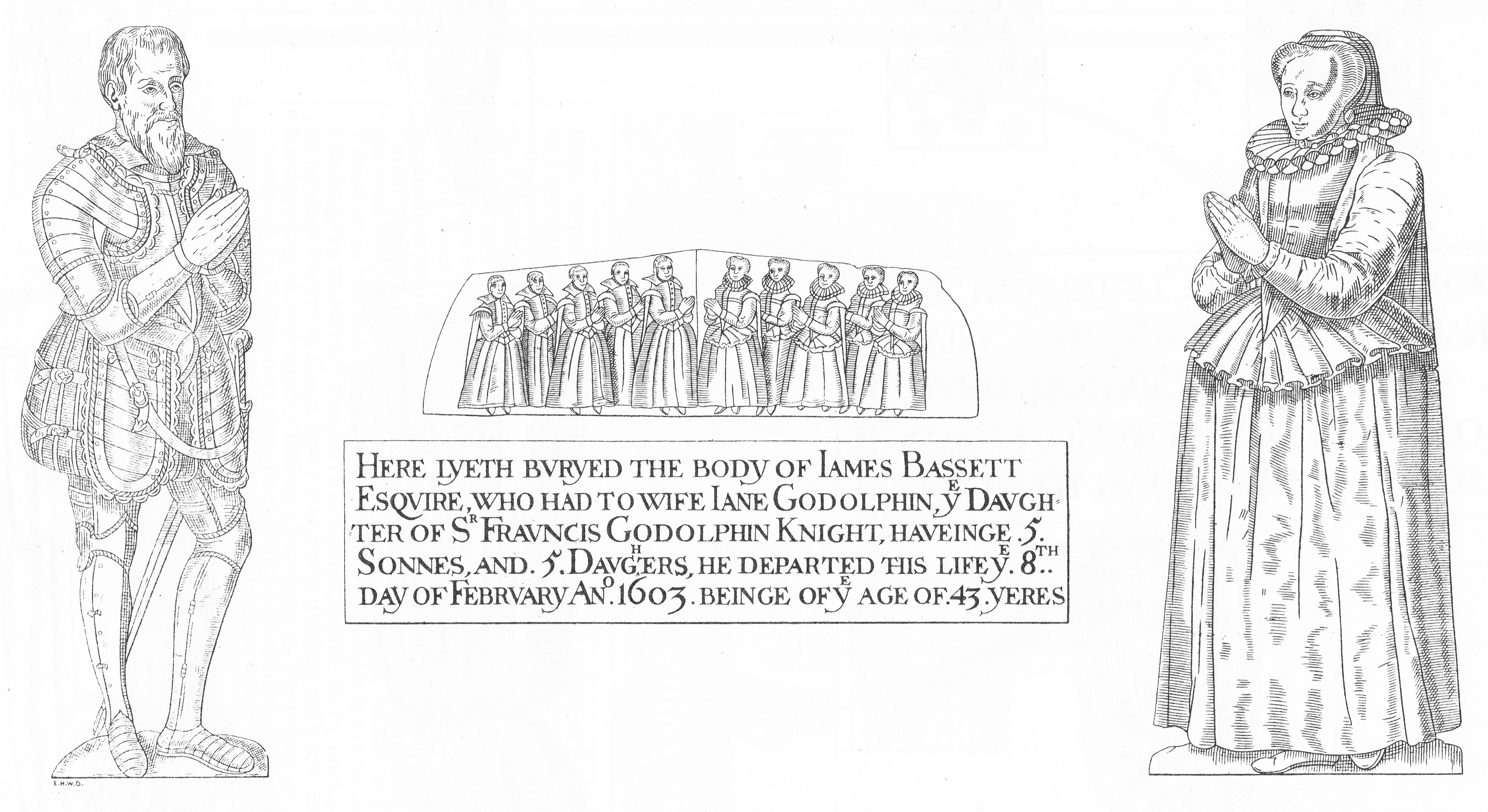
Monumental brass of James Basset (d. 1603) of Tehidy, Illogan Church

- James Basset, died 1603, son and heir. He inherited Tehidy under the above entail. He married Jane Godolphin, daughter of Sir Francis Godolphin. His monumental brass showing himself dressed in armour opposite his wife, with their ten children between, exists in Illogan Church, with the following inscription:

"Here lyeth buryed the body of James Bassett Esquire who had to wife Jane Godolphin ye daughter of Sr Frauncis Godolphin, knight, haveinge 5 sonnes and 5 da'u'hers. He departed this life ye 8th day of February An'o 1603 beinge of ye age of 43 yeres"

- Sir Francis Basset, 1594–1645, Royalist and High Sheriff of Cornwall, 1642 (married Anne, daughter of Sir Jonathan Trelawny)
- John Basset, c. 1624–1661. MP for St Ives
- Francis Basset, died 1675.
- Francis Basset, 1674–1721. MP for Mitchell. High Sheriff of Cornwall, 1708.
- John Pendarves Basset, 1713–1739
- Francis Basset (1715–1769) MP for Penryn
- Sir Francis Basset, 1757–1835 (son was John Basset – MP for Helston)
- Frances Basset, 2nd Baroness Basset, 1751–1855
- John Francis Basset (1831–1869)
- Arthur Basset (1833-1870)
- Gustavus Lambert Basset (1834-1888) – in 1872 Gustavus Basset of Tehidy Park was quoted as the fifth largest landowner in Cornwall with 16,969 acres (68.67 km^{2}).
- Arthur Francis Basset (1873–1950) – moved to Crewkerne in 1915, then to the Lodge House of Hatfield House and later to London. Sold Tehidy in 1915. At the time of his death, he was living at Norcott Hill, Northchurch, and left an estate valued at £204,851.

== Senior Devon branch ==
In 1558 the Bassets divided into two branches, the senior remaining at Umberleigh in Devon having given Tehidy to the junior branch, which remained there until 1915. The senior Devon branch were seated in addition at Heanton Punchardon in Devon, and became extinct in the male line in 1802, but continued under the adopted name of Basset via the female line, in the successive families of Davie and Williams at Watermouth Castle until that adoptive line failed a second time on the death in 1907 without children of Walter Basset Basset (1863–1907) (born Walter Basset Williams). The remaining Basset manors in Devon of Umberleigh and Berrynarbor (in which was situated Watermouth Castle) were then sold.

== Junior Cornish Branch ==
The junior Cornish branch continues to this day in 2017, but Tehidy was sold by the family in 1915. The Cornish branch was re-founded by George Basset (died 1580) who in 1558 had been given Tehidy by his nephew Sir Arthur Basset (1541–1586), of Umberleigh, who was buried in the Umberleigh Chapel in Devon (now a ruin) but whose chest tomb was moved circa 1820 to nearby Atherington Church where it remains today.

=== Descent of junior Cornish branch ===
The descent of the junior branch of the Basset family of Tehidy is as follows:

- George Basset (died 1580), second son of Sir John Bassett (1462–1529), KB, of Umberleigh, was given Tehidy by his nephew Sir Arthur Basset (1541–1586), of Umberleigh. He married Jacquetta Coffin.
- James Basset (son) of Tehidy, in 1587 married Jane Godolphin, daughter of Sir Francis Godolphin, knight and had nine children.
- Sir Francis Basset (died 1645), of Tehidy, (son) a strenuous royalist, High Sheriff of Cornwall, 1642; sold St Michael's Mount in order to pay fine levied on him by Cromwell during the Commonwealth. Married in 1620 to Anne Trelawny, daughter of Sir Jonathan Trelawny, knight.
- John Basset (2nd surviving son) (c. 1624–1661), of Tehidy, MP for St Ives; married Anne Delbridge of Barnstaple.
- Francis Basset (died 1675; son), married Lucy Hele.
- Francis Basset (1674-1721; son) of Tehidy; MP for Mitchell, High Sheriff of Cornwall, 1708; married, secondly, to Mary Pendarves.
- John Pendarves Basset (1713–1739), (eldest son), married Anne Prideaux (d.1760), daughter and co-heir of Sir Edmund Prideaux, 5th Baronet of Netherton. His widow purchased the palatial Haldon House in the parish of Dunchideock, Devon, from Sir John Chichester, 5th Baronet (1721-1784) of Youlston in the parish of Shirwell, Devon, where she was resident in 1758.
- John Prideaux Basset (1740 (posthumous)-1756), (son), died aged 16, when his heir became his uncle, Francis Basset (died 1769)
- Francis Basset (1715-1769; uncle) of Tehidy, formerly of Imley, Northamptonshire, 2nd son of Francis Basset (died 1721) of Tehidy. MP for Penryn 1766-69. Married in 1756 to Margaret St Aubyn (died 1768), daughter of Sir John St Aubyn, 3rd Baronet
- Francis Basset, 1st Baron de Dunstanville and Basset (1757–1835), eldest son. Died without male issue, left one daughter Frances Basset, 2nd Baroness Basset (1781–1855), who died unmarried.
- John Basset (1791-1843; nephew), son of Rev. John Basset, 2nd son of Francis Basset (died 1769) by his wife Mary Wingfield, daughter of George Wingfield of Durham. MP for Helston 1840-41. Married Elizabeth Mary Price, daughter of Sir Rose Price, 1st Baronet (1768–1834), of Trengwainton.
- John Francis Basset (1831-1869; eldest son), married Hon. Emily Prendergast, daughter of John Vereker, 3rd Viscount Gort (1790-1865); died childless. Rebuilt Tehidy House in 1861.
- Arthur Basset (1833-1870; brother), died unmarried.
- Gustavus Lambart Basset (1834-1888; brother), married in 1869 Charlotte Mary Elmhirst (died 1898)
- Arthur Francis Basset (b. 1873; son), married Rebecca Salusbury-Trelawny, daughter of Sir William Lewis Salusbury-Trelawny, 10th Baronet (1844–1917). Sold Tehidy in 1915.
- Daniel Bassett (born 1988), A marketer and businessman within the technology sector.
- Ronald Lambart Basset (1898-1972; son), 2nd Scots Greys Regiment, married in 1931 Lady Elizabeth Legge (1908–2000), daughter of William Legge, 7th Earl of Dartmouth (1881–1958). She was appointed in 1959 an Extra Woman of the Bedchamber to Queen Elizabeth The Queen Mother and became one of the Queen Mother's favourite and longest serving ladies in waiting. She was appointed DCVO.
- Bryan Ronald Basset, CBE (1932-2010; son); Chairman, Royal Ordnance, who in 1987 oversaw the sale of the public-sector business and its 16 factories and 19,000 employees to British Aerospace. He attended Eton College and the Royal Military Academy, Sandhurst, and became a captain in the Scots Guards. He worked as a stockbroker in Toronto, Canada, in 1957. In 1959, he returned to the City of London where he joined Panmure Gordon & Co until 1972. In 1971 he and his wife survived a serious accident on a private road on his father-in-law's Holkham Hall estate, when in thick fog his Bentley hit an 80 ft high obelisk. In 1972 he was appointed managing director of Philip Hill Investment Trust until 1985, when he was appointed chairman of Royal Ordnance. He inherited from his mother a 1/100 share of the office of Joint Hereditary Lord Great Chamberlain. He farmed at Quarles, on the Holkham estate, where he enjoyed shooting and fishing and where he bred Saler cattle and won supreme titles at the 1997 Royal Show at Stoneleigh. In 1960 he married Lady Carey Elizabeth Coke, daughter of Thomas William Edward Coke, 5th Earl of Leicester (1908–1976) of Holkham Hall in Norfolk. Deemed the "marriage of the year", attended by the Queen Mother, it was broadcast by Anglian Television. He had children including:
  - David Francis Basset (1961-2010) eldest son and heir apparent, who died aged 49 with no sons.
  - Michael James Basset (born 1963). Married Caroline Bailey on 7 September 1996. Has a daughter, Elizabeth Jane Basset (born 1998).
  - James Bryan Basset (born 1968), a former Page of Honour to the Queen, who has a son, Harry James Oscar Basset (born 2002).
