= Gittisham =

Village in Devon, England

Coordinates: 50.779°N 3.229°W

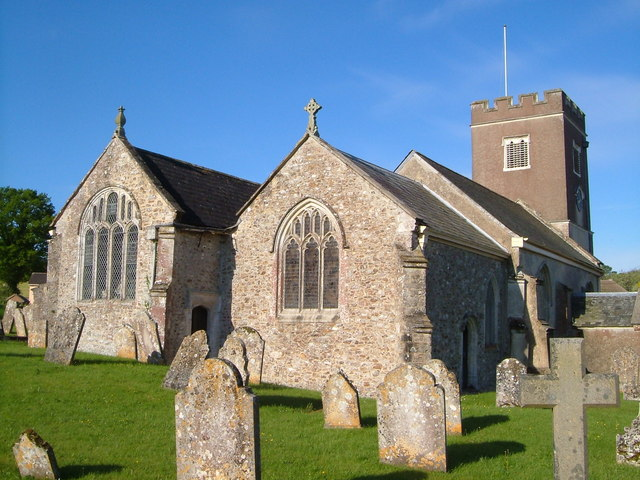
- St Michael's church, Gittisham

- Location within Devon
- Population: 838 (2021 census)
- OS grid reference: SY1398
- Civil parish: Gittisham
- District: East Devon
- Shire county: Devon
- Region: South West
- Country: England
- Sovereign state: United Kingdom

Gittisham is a village and civil parish in East Devon, Devon, England, near Honiton. The village is 3 miles (5 km) from Ottery St Mary and it has a church called St Michael. The parish is surrounded, clockwise from the north, by the parishes of Awliscombe, Honiton, Sidmouth, Ottery St Mary, Feniton and Buckerell. In 2021 the parish had a population of 838.

== History ==
The Roman road from Axminster to Exeter (whose course is followed by the A30 road) passes through the northern edge of the parish. In about AD 60 the Romans built a small fort on the road less than a kilometre NW of the modern village. It appears to have been dismantled by the army around AD 80: so its military existence more or less coincided with the presence of legions at Exeter before they moved to south Wales. There was also a small civilian settlement at the Gittisham fort. (Devon and Dartmoor Historic Environment Record) The Gittisham fort was about halfway between Axminster and Exeter, and stood at the point on the Roman road nearest to Hembury hill fort, where there is evidence of Roman military occupation in the middle of the first century.
