= Youlston Park =

Country house in Devon, England

Coordinates: 51.1185°N 4.0209°W

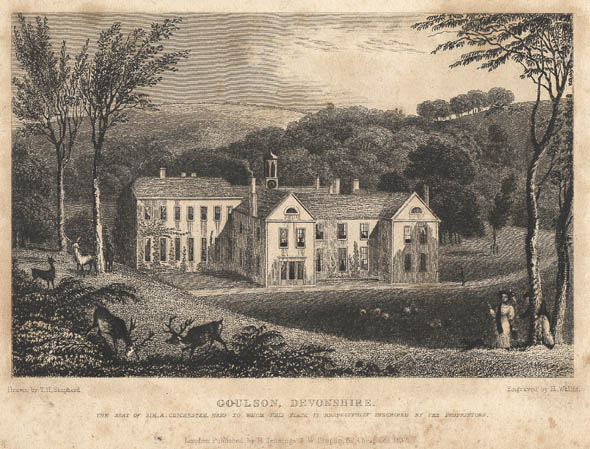
Youlston House, 19th-century engraving with caption: "Goulson [sic], Devonshire, the seat of Sir A. Chichester, Bart., to whom this plate is respectfully inscribed by the publishers"

Youlston Park, also known as Youlston House, is a privately owned 17th-century mansion house situated at Shirwell, near Barnstaple, North Devon, England. It is a Grade I listed building. The parkland is Grade II listed in the National Register of Historic Parks and Gardens. The game larder and stables are individually listed Grade II. The pair of entrance lodges are listed Grade II*.

The mediaeval origins of the house including a detached hall and a kitchen block were incorporated into the new house built in the late 17th century by Sir Arthur Chichester, 3rd Baronet, Member of Parliament for Barnstaple, who died in 1718. (He was a younger son of the first of the Chichester baronets.)

The south-facing two-storey entrance front has seven bays, two of which are set within each of the gabled projections to the east and west. The entrance porch supported by four classical columns sits within the western projection. A recessed wing of seven bays adjoins to the west. The rear domestic wing carries an octagonal bell turret and clock dial. There are many fine 17th- and 18th-century internal features.

In 1872, the mansion sat within its own park and estate of some 7000 acres
