= Manor of Heanton Punchardon =

Manor in Heanton Punchardon, Devon, England

The Manor of Heanton Punchardon was a manor in the parish of Heanton Punchardon, Devon, England.

== Descent of the manor ==
=== Punchardon ===
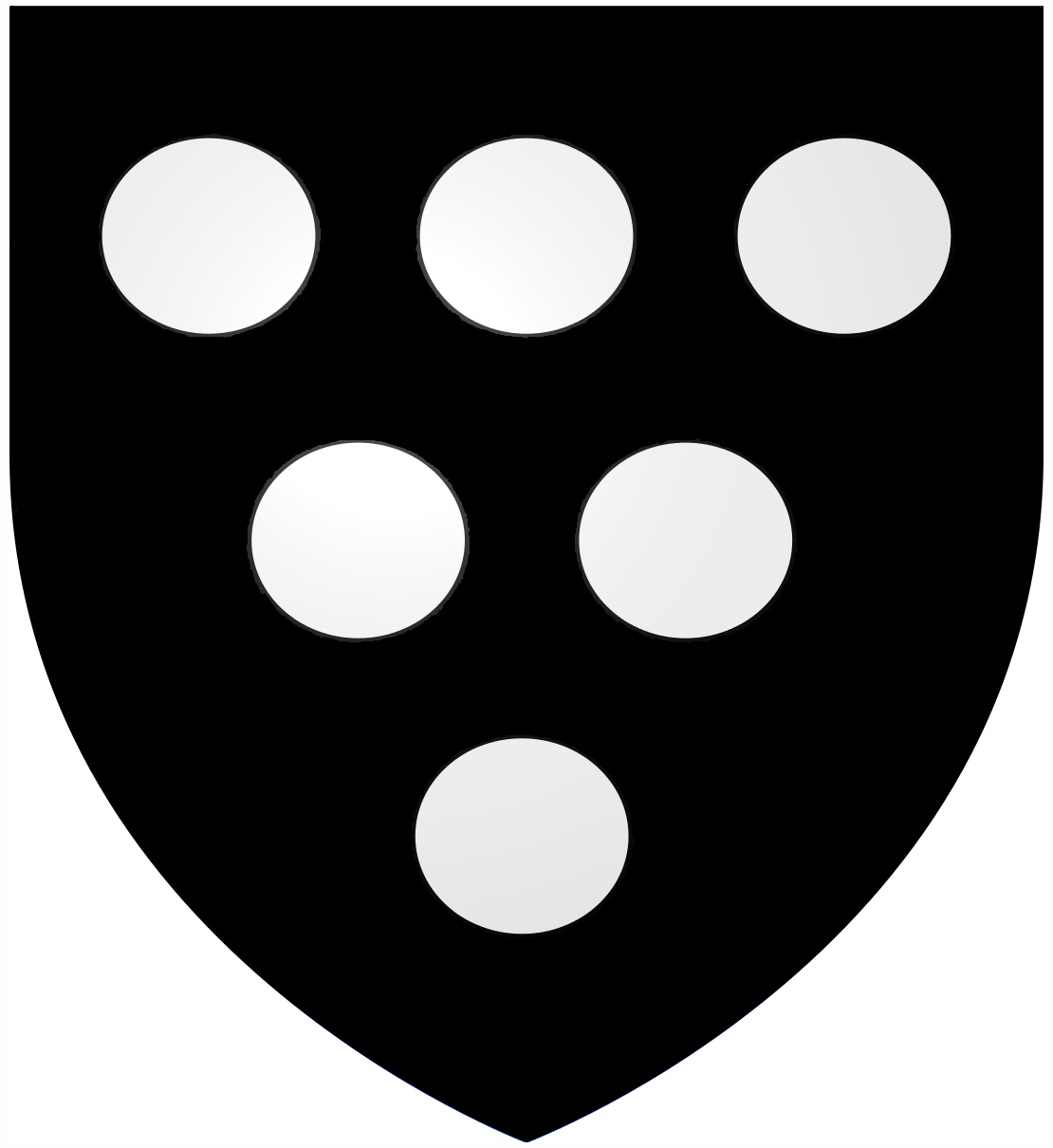
Arms of Punchardon, of Heanton Punchardon, according to Guillim (died 1621): Sable, six plates three, two, one

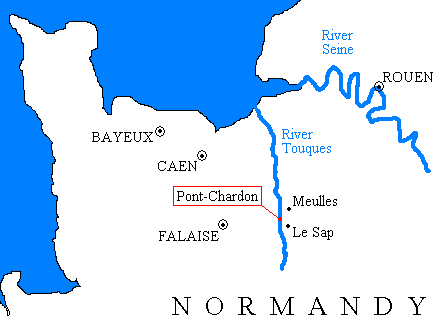
Map showing location of Pont-Chardon in Normandy, and its proximity to Meulles and Le Sap, the chief seats of his overlord in England Baldwin FitzGilbert, Sheriff of Devon and feudal baron of Okehampton

Hantone is recorded in the Domesday Book of 1086 as held by Robert de Pont-Chardon from Baldwin the Sheriff (died 1090), first feudal baron of Okehampton. The manor of Hantone included a mill, a fishery, had land for 12 ploughs with 24 villagers, with 10 acres of meadow, 100 acres of pasture and 100 acres of woodland. Of livestock it had 11 cattle, 9 pigs and 163 sheep.

Robert's family were lords of the manor of Pont-Chardon ("Chardon Bridge", literally "Thistle Bridge") (modern Pontchardon) in Calvados, Normandy, situated on the River Touques. His name was Latinized to de Ponte Cardonis or de Ponte Carduno ("from the bridge of Cardon"). Robert de Pont-Chardon was certainly well rewarded for his companionship and support by Baldwin FitzGilbert (died 1090), Sheriff of Devon, and feudal baron of Okehampton (alias Baldwin de Meulles and Baldwin du Sap), tenant-in-chief of 176 manors in Devon, who granted him lands in England amounting to four and a quarter knight's fees. Baldwin's chief seats in Normandy were Meulles and Le Sap, from which he took his alternative surnames, which were located 7 kilometers north-east and 7 kilometers south-east of Pont-Chardon respectively. The lands granted to Robert were chiefly in Devon, Somerset, Hertfordshire and a manor in Hampshire. His Devon estates comprised the following five manors, all in North Devon and all held from Baldwin the Sheriff (whose follower he thus may have been):

- Heanton (Braunton hundred)
- Hagginton (Ilfracombe parish, Braunton hundred)
- Charles (anciently Charnies) (Shirwell hundred)
- Mockham (Charles parish, Shirwell hundred)
- Blakewell (Marwood parish, Braunton hundred)

In 1894 Reverend Elgood Punchard published his research into the Punchard family in a volume entitled "Punchard of Heaton Punchardon - Records of an Unfortunate Family" in which he traced the descent from wealth and standing in royal favour in the Norman era to relative obscurity by Tudor times in the 16th century. Rev. Punchard described the descent of the Punchardon family thus (largely following Pole):

- Sir William I de Punchardon, eldest son of Robert, who retained the Devon and Hampshire estates but those in Hertfordshire Somerset fell to younger brothers.
- Roger de Punchardon (died 1243), eldest son. After a few transactions with his brothers Reginald and Robert, he confined his interest to Devonshire. In 1220 he acquired the manor of Coombe His nephew Oliver, son to Reginald, was the last of the Hampshire family concerned with Devon and was summoned once as jurator in the hundred of Haytor.
- Sir William II de Punchardon, eldest son of Roger, succeeded in 1243 and largely increased the estates. In 1254 he was "coronator", with de Briwere and another knight, concerning wreckage; in 1259 he was a juror concerning the claims of Isabell de Forz, Countess of Albemarle, daughter of Baldwin de Redvers, 6th Earl of Devon (1217–1245). His widow Ermegard de Punchardon outlived him twenty years, and married Alexander de Viteri, who tried (though ineffectually) to retain possession of Heanton and Charles.
- Sir John Punchardon, son and heir, last of the direct male line. Mention of him is frequently made in various documents down to 1296; indeed, as Westcote (d.circa 1637) quaintly says, "There are few ancient evidences in those parts, whereunto the Punchardons have not been witnesses: yea sometimes two or three of them...Heanton is surnamed Punchardon; the parish reserving charily the old lord's name of long antiquity, and therewithal copious in some ages". he left three daughters as co-heiresses:
  - Ermegard de Punchardon, heiress of Heanton Punchardon, wife of Sir Philip Beaumont of Shirwell. She left an only son John Beaumont, who married Alice Scudamore and in the second generation, the male issue here also was extinct. But Joan Beaumont, the wife of Sir James Chudleigh, gave Heanton Punchardon to Richard Beaumont, nephew of the first Sir Philip Beaumont, whose last descendant and heiress, Joan Beaumont, married John Basset of Whitechapel, Bishops Nympton. John Basset, after several lawsuits in Chancery, secured the Punchardon estates and his successors were possessed of Heanton until the late 19th century. One of them was Colonel Arthur Basset, who held St. Michael's Mount for King Charles and surrendered to Colonel Hammond in 1646.
  - Mabil de Punchardon, wife of Sir Henry Ralegh of Raleigh, Pilton, heiress of Charles, whose descendants held that manor in direct descent for seven generations.
  - Margery de Punchardon, heiress of West Buckland, who married twice, firstly to Sir Richard Beauple, of Landkey and secondly to Joel de Buckenton. She died without children.

==== Junior branches of Punchardon ====
Of this senior stock was William de Punchardon (died 1274), priest and prebend of Bosham, and Canon of Crediton in 1270, and Canon of Exeter in 1273. His will, dated 3 February 1274-5 is preserved in Bishop Bronescombe's Register. In 1268 Simon Punchardon was presented to the Rectory of West Buckland, by Dame Ermegard.

==== Punchardon of Little Bovey ====
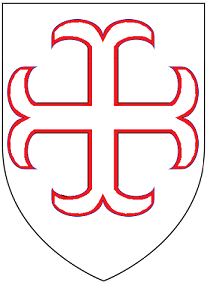
Arms of Punchardon of Little Bovey: Argent, a cross cerclée voided gules

Although the elder branch of the family in North Devon, continued only in female lines after 1300, other descendants of the first Robert de Punchardon were landholders at Little Bovey, in South Devon, down to 1413. Hugh Punchardon, with the consent of Reginald de Punchardon his eldest son, during the reign of King John (1299–1216) gave lands there to his daughter Mary de Punchardon. Roger de Punchardon held the same estates during the reign of King Henry III (1216–1272). In 1277 Sir William de Punchardon of this line, following a muster at Worcester, performed military service due from Edmund, Earl of Cornwall. On his own tenure he was further summoned to Carmarthen in 1282, for the war in West Wales. In 1310 another William Punchardon served for Richard Lovel, and attended the levy at Tweedmouth. Three years later he crossed overseas on the same military duty, and in 1312 (Note: regnal year 6 Edward II) his lands had the usual foedus de protectione (letters of protection). In 1311 he was manucaptor of Alfred de Penhergard, burgess returned for Liskeard. In 1322 a certain Thomas Punchard was similarly bound for the return of John le Taverner for Bristol. The most distinguished of the line was Sir Richard de Punchardon, made a knight banneret by King Edward III (1327–1377). During the French Campaign of 1356, which ended with the Battle of Poitiers on 19 September, he was caught in an ambuscade, but with his gallant comrades, he fought a way through to the main army under the Black Prince. (Note: Punchard, 1894, quoting: Froissart. Chron : II. p. 296; III. p. 16. In vol: iv. Sir Richard is referred to as a Poitevin; but this could only have been by enfeoffment. He was constantly at the Court of Edward III. See also Lysons' " Britannia," vi. p. 262.) Sir Richard de Punchardon's lands at Bovey were again under royal protection in 1359. He stood high in court favour, and was entrusted by the King with the guardianship of the young de Bensted of Benington, with estates in Essex, Hertfordshire, Cambridgeshire and Wiltshire. Froissart speaks of him as Marshal of Aquitaine in 1366, at the birth of Richard of Bordeaux. His grandson Richard II Punchardon held Bovey until 1413. In 1446 John Punchardon, perhaps a brother, was noted at South Hole, Hardesworth and West Barlyngton. The Bovey line probably ended during the Wars of the Roses as no further record of its fate survives.

==== Heraldry ====
According to Guillim (died 1621) the arms of the Punchardon family of Heanton were: Sable, six plates three, two, one, sometimes shown as ten plates, four, three, two, and one. (Note: (Black shield with six or ten silver circles; Bovey Punchard: Silver shield with a red curly-ended hollowed-out cross) Guillim, John, Display of Heraldry, 1632, p.297: " Hee beareth sable, six plates : three, two and one: by the name of Punchardon. These are bullions of silver, having no manner of impression upon them: but are only prepared ready for the stampe. In the blazoning of this there is no mention made of colour, because they are alwaies silver" See also Berry’s " Encyclopaedia Heraldica," ii. and iv) However, according to Pole (died 1635), Sir William Punchardon of Heanton Punchardon bore: Argent, a cross sarcel voided gules. Rev. Punchard (1894) suggested this coat given by Pole was that of the Bovey (Little Bovey) line of the Punchardon family. Risdon (died 1640) gave the arms of Willelmus de Ponte Cardonis, de Lydyet (possibly Lydiard-Punchardon, Somerset) as: Argent, a cross moline voided gules. The Crest was: A unicorn's head erased gules bezantee armed or. (Note: "Gold horned, red unicorn head with a jagged neck edge over gold coins".)

=== Basset ===
Arms of Basset: Barry wavy of six or and gules. (Note: These arms are shown for Basseth in the Book Of Additions by Matthew Paris (died 1259), showing heraldic shields of King Henry III (1216–1272) and his principal nobles. They can be seen on four 17th-century Basset family mural monuments in Heanton Punchardon Church)

The manor of Heanton Punchardon was held from the 15th century to 1802 by the Basset family, formerly of Umberleigh, whose seat was Heanton Court, situated on the bank of the River Taw, 3/4 mile SE of the village. The house is now the Tarka Inn. The last of the male line was Francis Basset (c. 1740 – 1802), MP for Barnstaple, who died in 1802 unmarried and without children. This last Francis Basset appears to have been the "Colonel Basset" who was master of the North Devon Staghounds (which became in 1837 the Devon and Somerset Staghounds) from 1775 t0 1784. Confusion however arises between this Francis Basset Esq. (c. 1740 – 1802) of Heanton Court and his contemporary and distant cousin (from a junior branch of the family) Francis Basset, 1st Baron de Dunstanville and Basset (1757–1835), of Tehidy in Cornwall, who is stated in his History of Parliament biography to have been Lt-Col. of the North Devon Militia from 1779.

The mural monument to Elizabeth Bassett (1571–1635) is situated on the east wall of the Bassett Chapel. She was one of the four daughters and co-heiresses of Sir William Peryam (1534–1604), Lord Chief Baron of the Exchequer, by his second wife Anne Parker, daughter of John Parker of North Molton, Devon. She married in 1591 Sir Robert Bassett (1574–1641) of Heanton Punchardon, MP for Plymouth in 1593, and bore him two sons and four daughters, amongst whom was Colonel Arthur Bassett, MP, who erected the monument.

=== Davie-Basset ===
The heir of Francis Basset (died 1802) was his nephew Joseph Davie Esq. of Watermouth Castle, near Lynmouth, son of John Davie of Orleigh Court, near Bideford, by his wife Eleanora Basset, Francis Basset's sister. In accordance with the terms of the inheritance, as was then usual in such cases, Joseph Davie and his descendants adopted the arms and surname of Basset in lieu of their patronymic.

=== Williams ===
Arms of Williams of Caerhays, Scorrier & Tregullow in Cornwall: Vair, three crescents or.

A catalogue note in the Williams Estate Archive held in the North Devon Record Office under ref: B170, states: "William Williams purchased the Heanton Estate from the Bassetts in the mid nineteenth century and the family lived at Heanton Court". Documents show Williams as the new owner as early as 1852 and the Comprehensive Gazetteer of England and Wales in 1894-5 stated a member of the Williams family to be lord of the manor. A younger member of this family became heir to the Davie-Basset family, namely Charles Henry Williams, Esq., (who later assumed the surname Basset) of Watermouth Castle, near Lynmouth, JP and MP for Barnstaple (1868–1874) and master of the Devon and Somerset Staghounds from 1887 to 1893. Born 16 November 1834, being the fourth surviving son of Sir William Williams, 1st Baronet (1791–1870), MFH, of Tregullow, Cornwall, by his wife Caroline Eales, younger daughter of Richard Eales of Eastdon. He married on 7 January 1878, Harriet Mary Basset, only daughter of Arthur Davie Basset, Gentleman, of Watermouth Castle, and sister and co-heiress of Reverend Arthur Crawfurth Davie Basset, JP and MA, also of Watermouth. Again there had been a failure in the male Basset line. As a condition of his inheritance he assumed by Royal Licence in 1880 the surname of Basset in lieu of his patronymic, with the arms of Basset.

In 1861 the occupant of Heanton Court was George Norman.
