= Richard Coffin (1456–1523) =

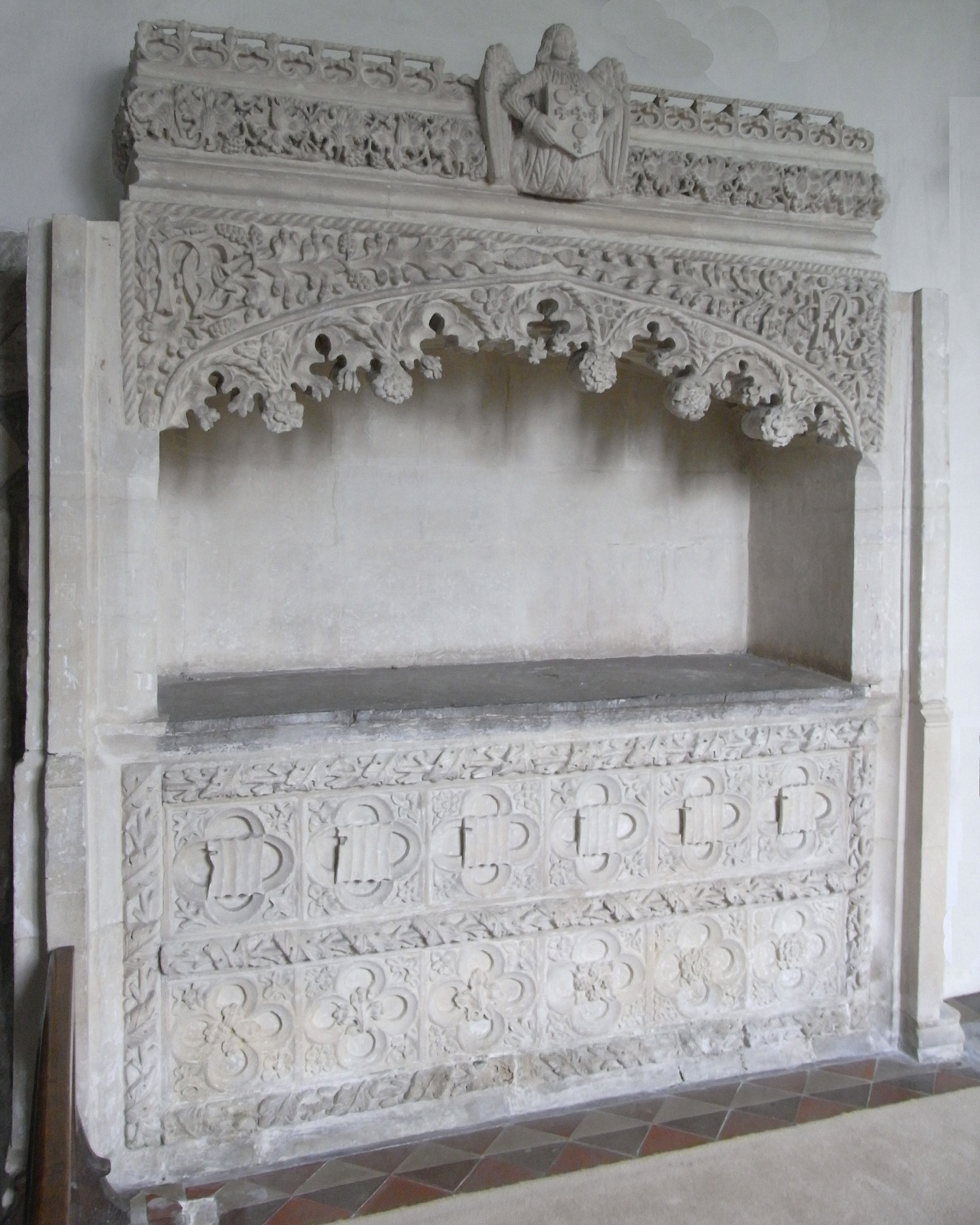
Easter Sepulchre monument to Richard Coffin, Heanton Punchardon Church

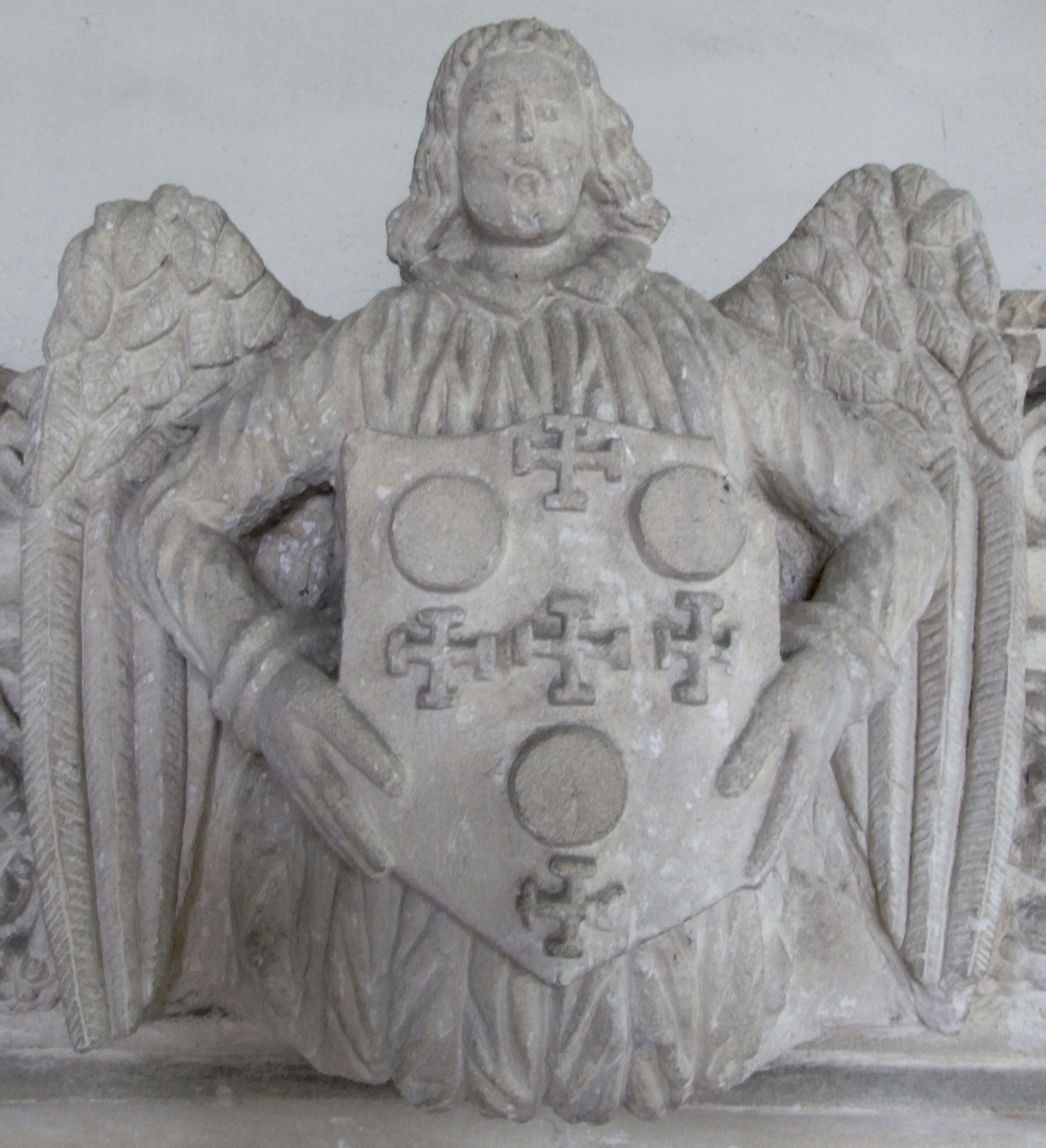
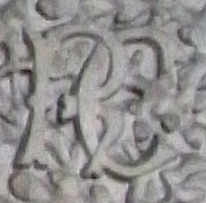
Details from Easter Sepulchre monument to Richard Coffin: left: arms of Coffin; right: entwined initials "RC", two sets in spandrels of canopy

Richard Coffin (1456–1523), of Alwington and Heanton Punchardon in North Devon, was a Sheriff of Devon.

He was the eldest son and heir of William Coffin of Alwington (died 1486) by his wife Margaret Giffard, daughter of Thomas Giffard of Halsbury in the parish of Parkham, North Devon.

Coffin married twice. His first marriage was to Alice Gambon, daughter of John Gambon of Moorstone in Devon, by whom he had the following children:

- John Coffin (died 1528), eldest son and heir, who married Elizabeth Hingeston.
- Sir William Coffin (died 1538), a Gentleman of the Privy Chamber to King Henry VIII and Master of the Horse to Queen Jane Seymour. He was elected MP for Derbyshire in 1529.
- Jane Coffin, married John Bury (1481–1533), lord of the manor of Colleton, Chulmleigh, Devon.

Coffin's second marriage was to a lady named Jacquet, who survived him.

Besides his paternal estates, Richard Coffin held leases from the Beaumont family of Shirwell of the North Devon manors of East Hagginton in the parish of Berrynarbor. During his tenure of Heanton Punchardon the overlordship of the manor was inherited from the Beaumonts by Sir John Basset (1462–1528) of Umberleigh. In this connection he and his widow, and his son and his widow, are mentioned several times in the Lisle Letters, the correspondence addressed to Basset's widow Honor Grenville, Viscountess Lisle (died 1566).

Coffin died in 1523 and was buried in Heanton Punchardon Church, in accordance with the wish expressed in his will. His Easter Sepulchre tomb survives in the chancel of the church.

== Sources ==
- Byrne, Muriel St. Clare, (ed.) The Lisle Letters, 6 vols, University of Chicago Press, Chicago & London, 1981, vol.1, pp. 605–7 & vol.4, Chapter 7.
- Vivian, Lt.Col. J.L., (ed.) The Visitations of the County of Devon: Comprising the Heralds' Visitations of 1531, 1564 & 1620, Exeter, 1895
