= William Coffin (courtier) =

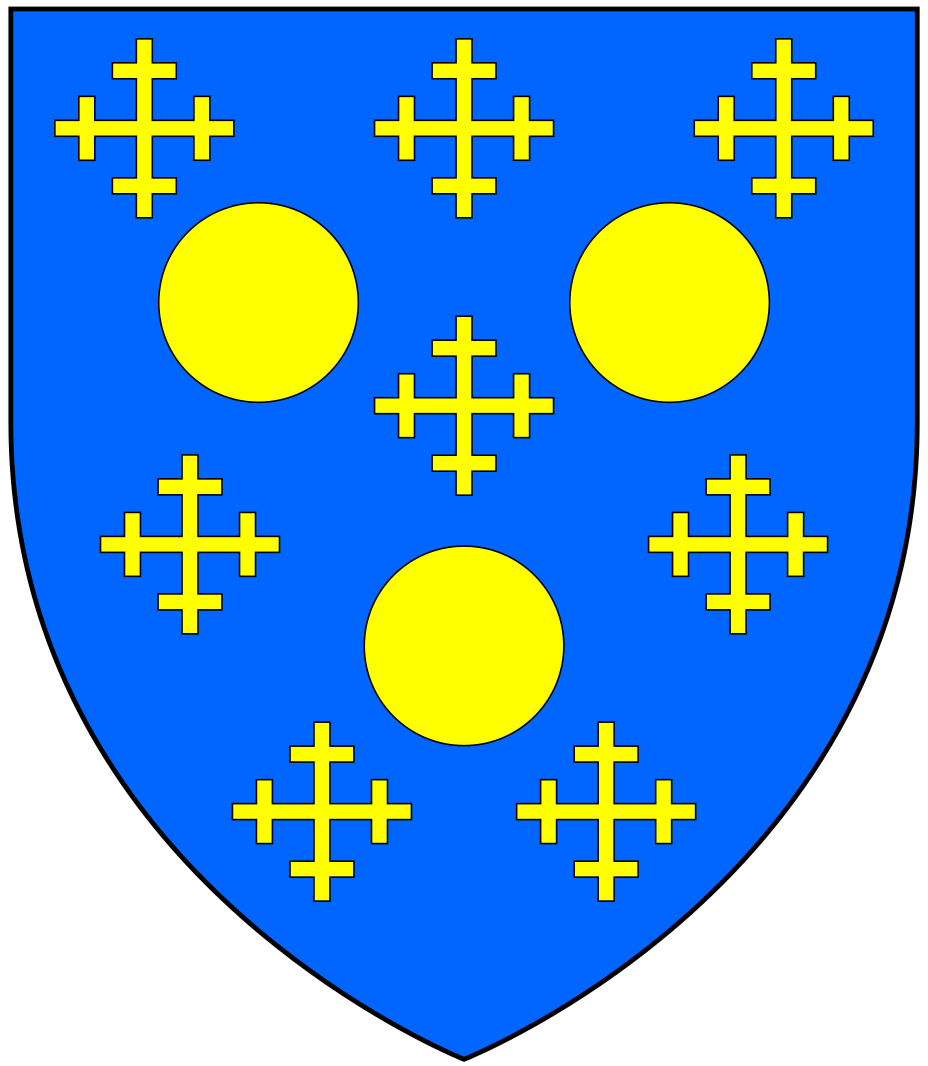
Arms of Coffin: Azure, three bezants between eight crosses crosslet or

Sir William Coffin (by 1492-8 December 1538) was a courtier at the court of King Henry VIII of England. He was a Gentleman of the Privy Chamber to King Henry VIII and Master of the Horse to Queen Jane Seymour. He was elected MP for Derbyshire in 1529.

== Origins ==
He was born circa 1495 at the ancestral manor of Portledge, in the parish of Alwington in North Devon. He was the younger son of Richard Coffin (1456–1523) of Alwington and Heanton Punchardon in North Devon, Sheriff of Devon in 1510, by his first wife Alice Gambon, daughter of John Gambon of Moorstone in Devon.

== Career ==
Sir William lived during the reign of Henry VIII, and was often seen at his court. He joined Henry VIII's household about 1515 as courtier and Gentleman of the Privy chamber, a post of great confidence and trust. There were 40 of these, and their duty was to wait on the king in public and private; they were all knights or esquires of distinction, and the attendance of two was required at each meal, to help and serve the king; they had also to sleep within call of the king at night.

In 1519, Sir William Coffin joined King Henry in the tournament of Guesnes, Field of the Cloth of Gold, as one of His Majesty's eighteen favourites. After Anne Boleyn's beheading, Sir William continued to serve in the king's Privy Chamber and as an attendant to His Majesty. He served the King's third wife, Jane Seymour, just as he had served Queen Anne.

In 1529 he was elected MP for Derbyshire, having acquired a connection with that county through his marriage to Margaret Dymocke. In 1531 he was appointed High Sheriff of Derbyshire and Nottinghamshire.

He was Master of the Horse at the coronation of Anne Boleyn in 1533, when the king knighted him.

The historian Eric Ives described Coffin as "a professional household administrator, actively concerned with the staffing of his department, and later to serve Jane Seymour in the same capacity."

== Marriage ==
William Coffin married Margaret Dymoke, the daughter of Sir Robert Dymoke of Scrivelsby, Lincolnshire, the Hereditary King's Champion, by his wife Anne Sparrow. She was the sister of Sir Edward Dymoke and had been since 1517 the widow of Sir Richard Vernon (died 1517) of Haddon Hall, Bakewell, Derbyshire. When Margaret Dymoke was left a wealthy widow by the death of her first husband, King Henry VIII urged her to marry Sir William Coffin.

In 1519, Margaret attended Catalina of Aragon at the Field of the Cloth of Gold and was a fellow courtier with Sir William Coffin, her second husband. Margaret was one of the gentlewomen sent to wait (and spy) upon Anne Boleyn in the Tower. Some accounts give the name as "Mistress Cosyns" but this is a mistake for Coffin (presumably the confusion was caused by the use of the long "S"). In Jane Seymour's household Margaret was a Lady of the Bedchamber. Shortly after Sir William Coffin's death in December, 1538, she remarried to Sir Richard Manners (died 1551) of Garendon, Leicestershire, MP for Leicestershire in 1542, a younger son of George Manners, 11th Lord Ros. Sir William Coffin died without children.

== Death and burial ==
Sir William Coffin died on 8 December 1538 at Standon, Hertfordshire. His death was sudden and he had made his will on the day he died. He was buried in the middle of the chancel of Standon Church, where survives his inscribed memorial stone.

== Succession ==
Sir William Coffin left no children. He bequeathed most of his leases and goods to his wife, whom he appointed his sole executrix. His Devon lands were inherited by three of his nephews; his lease of East Hagginton in Berrynarbor, Devon, he enfeoffed to the senior nephew Richard Coffin (died 1555), his eldest brother's son and heir. His properties in Bakewell, Derbyshire, he left to two of his servants, Henry Ireland and Robert Roo.

== Sources ==
- Black, C. J., biography of Coffin, William (by 1492–1538) of Porthledge, Devon and Bakewell, Derbys, published in The History of Parliament: the House of Commons 1509–1558, ed. S.T. Bindoff, 1982
- Vivian, Lt.Col. J.L., (Ed.) The Visitations of the County of Devon: Comprising the Heralds' Visitations of 1531, 1564 & 1620, Exeter, 1895, p. 208-11, pedigree of Coffin
- Byrne, Muriel St. Clare, (ed.) The Lisle Letters, 6 vols, University of Chicago Press, Chicago & London, 1981, vol.1
