= East Hagginton =

East Hagginton was a historic estate within the manor and parish of Berrynarbor near to the coast of North Devon. It is near to, if not actually encompassing, the site of Watermouth Castle.

== History ==
=== Descent of the estate ===
Variants of estates relating to the modern "Hagginton" are listed three times in the Domesday Book of 1086, referring to three almost or actually contiguous estates, all within Braunton hundred, two within the manor and parish of Berrynarbor, the third within the manor of Ilfracombe, immediately to the west of Berrynarbor. The Saxon name means "Haecga's farm". "Hagginton Hill" has survived today as the name of a hill immediately to the west of Berrynarbor village, and West Haggington Farm survives also.

The three Domesday Book entries are as follows:

- Hagintone (East Hagginton, in Berrynarbor parish, Braunton Hundred) was listed in the Domesday Book as the 27th of the 90 Devon holdings of Drogo which he held as mesne tenant from Geoffrey de Montbray, Bishop of Coutances. It paid tax for 1 virgate and had land for 2 ploughs. There were resident 2 villagers and 1 smallholder.
- Hagetone (East Hagginton, in Berrynarbor parish, Braunton Hundred) was listed in the Domesday Book as one of the 27 Devon holdings of Walter of Douai, alias "Walscin". His tenant was Wulfric. It paid tax for 3 virgates and had land for 5 ploughs. There were resident 10 villagers and 2 smallholders. This estate was held in the late 12/13th century by the Nerbert family, lords of the manor of Berry Nerbert (modern: Berrynarbor). At that time William Nerbert exchanged it, and it was subsequently held by the feudal barony of Dartington.
- Haintone (West Hagginton in Ilfracombe parish, Braunton hundred) was listed in the Domesday Book as held by Robert de Pont de Chardon from amongst the 176 Devon holdings of Baldwin de Moels, Sheriff of Devon. It paid tax for 1 hide and had land for 10 ploughs. There were 12 villagers, 4 smallholders, with 2 cattle, 4 pigs and 100 sheep. He also held Heanton Punchardon (later named after the family), Charles and Mockham from Baldwin. West Hagginton survives today as a farmhouse with much of its historic estate. This estate passed by inheritance from the family of Pont de Chardon to the family of Beaumont of Shirwell, also Domesday Book tenants, who at some time before 1504 leased the estate of East Hagginton (together with Heanton Punchardon) to Richard Coffin (1456–1523) of Alwington in North Devon, Sheriff of Devon in 1511. East Hagginton became the home of Richard Coffin's younger son Sir William Coffin (c. 1492 – 1538), a Gentleman of the Privy Chamber to King Henry VIII and Master of the Horse to Queen Jane Seymour and MP for Derbyshire in 1529. He died without progeny, having conveyed East Hagginton to his nephew Richard Coffin (died 1555), his eldest brother's son and heir.

=== Mentions in Lisle Papers ===
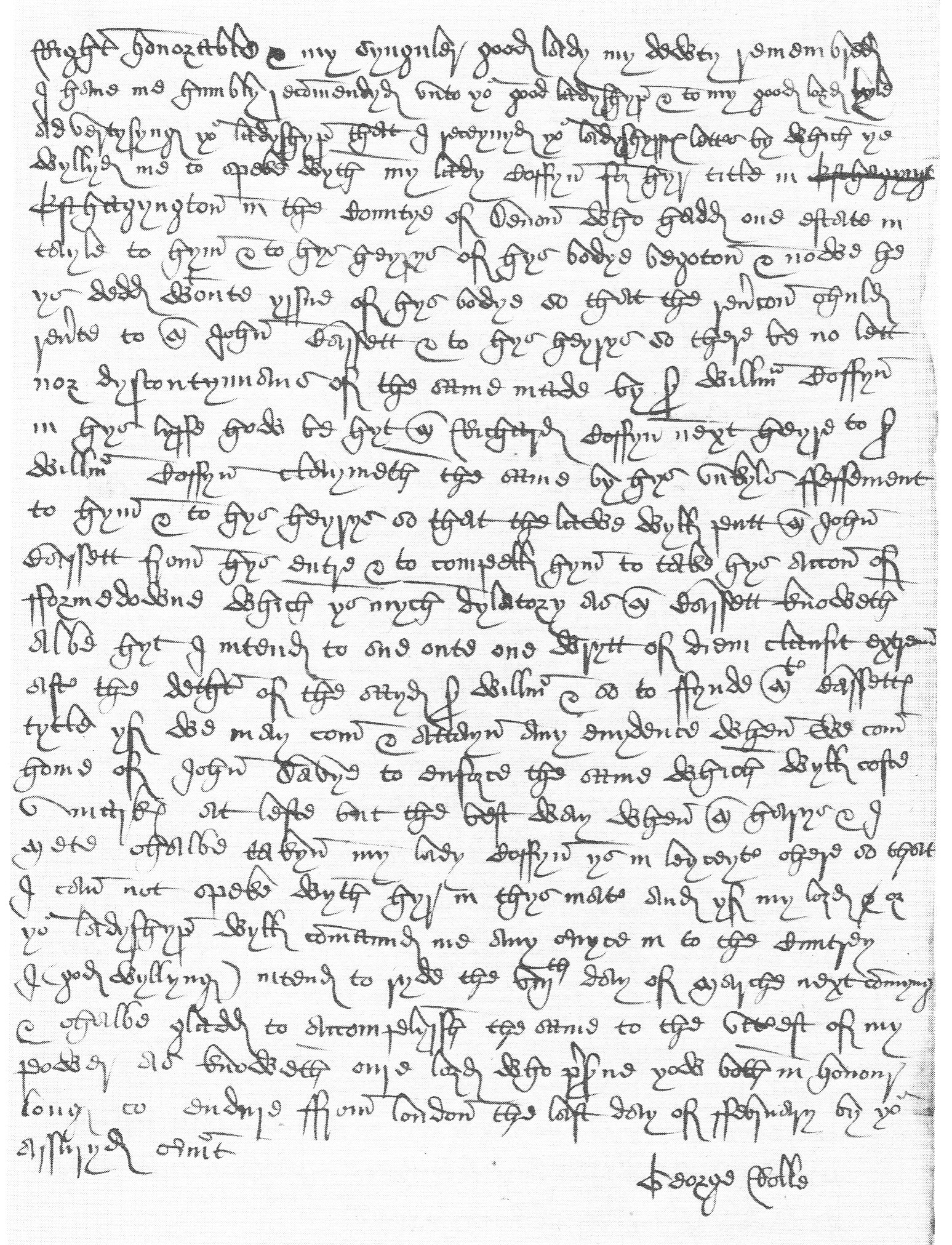
Letter written by George Rolle to Lady Lisle dated 28 February 1539, Lisle Letters, National Archives

At some time shortly before 1500 the overlordship had been inherited, with Umberleigh, Heanton Punchardon and many other estates, by the Basset family of Whitechapel, Devon, and Tehidy, Cornwall, co-heirs of the Beaumonts. The Bassets made great efforts to recover the lease from the Coffin family, which struggle is mentioned in the Lisle Papers. The legal dispute forms the subject of a surviving holograph letter dated 28 February 1539 written by the North Devon lawyer George Rolle (died 1552) to Viscountess Lisle (formerly Lady Basset):

"Right honourable and my singular good lady, my duty remembered, I have me humbly recommended unto your good ladyship and to my good Lord Lyle advertising your ladyship that I received your ladyship's letter by which ye willed me to speak with my Lady Coffyn for her title in East Haggynton in the county of Devon who had one estate in tail to him (i.e. her husband Sir William Coffyn) and to his heirs of her body begotten; and now he is dead without issue of his body so that the reversion should revert to Mr John Basset and to his heirs so there be no let nor discontinuance of the same made by Sir William Coffyn in his life. Howbeit Mr Richard Coffyn, next heir to Sir William Coffyn, claimeth the same by his uncle's feoffment to him and to his heirs so that the law will put Mr John Basset from his entry and to compel him to take his action of form down which is much dilatory as Mr Basset knoweth albeit I intend to sue unto one writ of diem clausit extremum after the death of the said Sir William and so to find Mr Basset's title if we may come and attain any evidence, when we come home, of John Davy, to enforce the same which will cost v marks at least. But the best way when Mr Harys and I meet shall be taken. My Lady Coffyn is in Leicestershire so that I could not speak with her in this matter. And if my lord or your ladyship will command me any service into the country I (God willing) intend to ride the viii th day of March next coming and shall be glad to accomplish the same to the utterest of my power as knoweth our Lord who preserve you both in honour long to endure. Ffrom London the last day of Ffebruary, by your assuryd servant George Rolle".

=== Acquired by Bassets ===
East Hagginton was eventually acquired by purchase, together with the lordship of the manor of Berrynarbor and the estate within it of Woolscott, shortly before 1810 from Rev. John Pine-Coffin by Joseph Davie Basset (1764–1846), who was the son and heir of John Davie of Orleigh by his wife Eleanor Basset (1741–1800), sister of the last in the male line of the Basset family, Col. Francis Basset (c. 1740 – 1802) of Heanton Court, Heanton Punchardon. In 1803 Joseph Davie assumed the surname and arms of Basset, on succeeding to the Basset estates under the will of his uncle Col. Francis Basset. Joseph sold Orleigh in 1807 and built Watermouth Castle as his principal residence, adjacent to or possibly within the estate of East Hagginton, rebuilt from the picturesquely sited Palladian house built by Hugh Fortescue, 1st Earl Clinton, 14th Baron Clinton (1696–1751), whose tenure in this location of Devon remains unexplained by available sources.

== Sources ==
- Risdon, Tristram (died 1640), Survey of Devon, 1811 edition, London, 1811, with 1810 Additions
- Gray, Todd & Rowe, Margery (Eds.), Travels in Georgian Devon: The Illustrated Journals of The Reverend John Swete, 1789–1800, 4 vols., Tiverton, 1999
- Thorn, Caroline & Frank, (eds.) Domesday Book, (Morris, John, gen.ed.) Vol. 9, Devon, Parts 1 & 2, Phillimore Press, Chichester, 1985.
- Vivian, Lt.Col. J.L., (Ed.) The Visitations of the County of Devon: Comprising the Heralds' Visitations of 1531, 1564 & 1620, Exeter, 1895.
- Byrne, Muriel St. Clare, (ed.) The Lisle Letters, 6 vols, University of Chicago Press, Chicago & London, 1981, vol.1
