= Francis Chichester =

British sailor

Sir Francis Chichester, whose 1966–67 global voyage was sponsored by the International Wool Secretariat, its Woolmark featured on his cricket cap

Sir Francis Charles Chichester KBE (17 September 1901 – 26 August 1972) was a British businessman, pioneering aviator and solo sailor.

He was knighted by Queen Elizabeth II for becoming the first person to sail single-handed around the world by the clipper route and the fastest circumnavigator, in nine months and one day overall in 1966–67.

== Biography ==
=== Early life ===
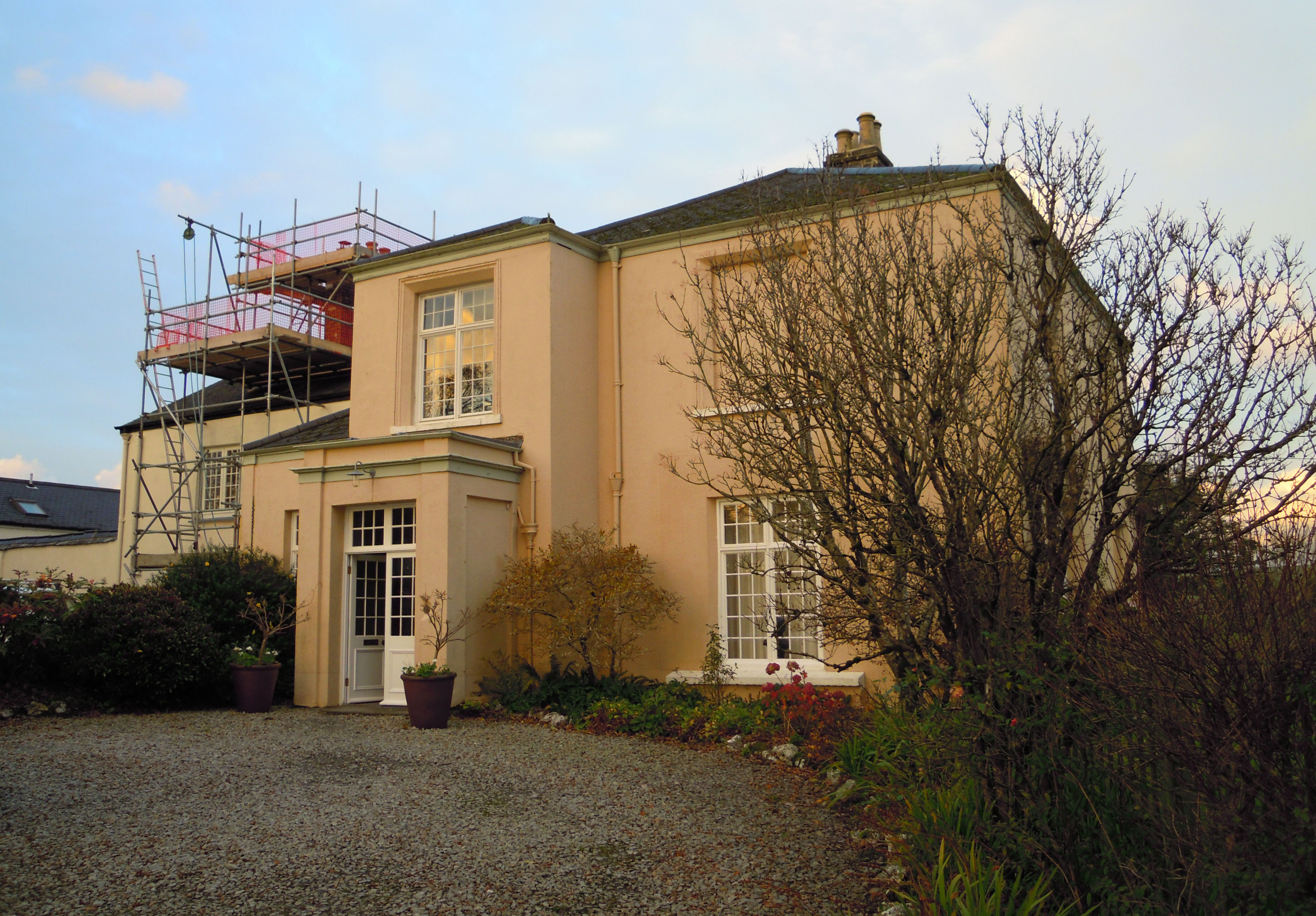
The former Rectory in Shirwell, Devon, birthplace of Francis Chichester; photographed in 2017

Francis Chichester after his solo flight from Croydon, England to Darwin, Mascot, Australia, 1930

Chichester was born in the rectory at Shirwell near Barnstaple in Devon, England, the son of a Church of England clergyman, Charles Chichester, himself the seventh son of Sir Arthur Chichester, 8th Baronet. His mother was Emily Annie, daughter of Samuel Page. At the age of six he was sent as a boarder to The Old Ride Preparatory School for boys, then attended Marlborough College during World War I. At the age of eighteen Chichester emigrated to New Zealand where in ten years he built up a prosperous business in forestry, mining and property development, only to suffer severe losses in the Great Depression.

=== Aviator ===
After returning to England in 1929 to visit his family, Chichester took flying lessons at Brooklands, Surrey, and qualified as a pilot. He then took delivery of a de Havilland Gipsy Moth aircraft, which he intended to fly to New Zealand, hoping to break Bert Hinkler's record solo flight back to Australia on the way. While mechanical problems meant that the record eluded him, he completed the trip in 41 days. The aircraft was then shipped to New Zealand. Finding that he was unable to carry enough fuel to cross the Tasman Sea directly, Chichester had his Gipsy Moth fitted with floats borrowed from the New Zealand Permanent Air Force, and went on to make the first solo flight across the Tasman Sea from East to West (New Zealand to Australia). He was the first to land an aircraft at Norfolk Island and Lord Howe Island. Again, the trip was delayed: after his aircraft was severely damaged at Lord Howe, he had to rebuild it himself with the help of islanders.

Though the concept of "off-course navigation" (steering to one side so you know which way the error is) is probably as old as navigation, Chichester was the first to use it in a methodical manner in an aircraft. His only method of fixing his position was to take sun sights with a sextant. As a solo pilot, this was a difficult thing to do in a moving aircraft, as he needed to fly the aircraft at the same time. After the sun sight was taken, he had to make calculations by long-hand. As all this could be unreliable, Chichester needed an alternative. When he reached a point at which the sun was at a calculated altitude above the horizon, the pilot then made a 90-degree turn to the left (or right as calculated) and then flew along this line until the destination was reached. Since he did not know in advance when he would arrive at a line of position passing through his destination, he calculated a table or graph of the Sun's altitude and azimuth at his destination for a range of times bracketing his ETA. The advantage of this method was that the effects of drift were reduced to errors in distance travelled, usually much smaller. Since Chichester arrived at Lord Howe Island in the afternoon, the Sun was to his north-west when he made his turn. Some hours before making his turn, close to local noon when the Sun was to his north, Chichester made two observations with his sextant to check his dead-reckoning course.

The general principle was, when the Sun is to the right or left of one's course one can check the course but not distance to the destination. When the Sun is ahead or behind one's course, the distance to one's destination can be checked but not one's course. Chichester planned his final approach to follow a line of position directly to his destination. This technique allowed him to find tiny islands in the Pacific. He was awarded the inaugural Guild of Air Pilots and Air Navigators Johnston Memorial Trophy for this trip. Chichester then decided to circumnavigate the world solo; he made it to Japan but at Katsuura, Chiba, he collided with an overhead cable, sustaining serious injuries.

=== Second World War cartography ===
Unable to join the Royal Air Force (RAF) at the outbreak of the Second World War due to age and eyesight, he was not granted a commission until 14 March 1941 when he joined the Royal Air Force Volunteer Reserve for the duration of hostilities. His civil occupation was listed as Air Navigation Specialist. His first posting was to the Air Ministry in the Navigation section of the Directorate of Air Member Training, where he served until August 1942. In July 1943 he was sent to the Empire Central Flying School where he instructed in navigation until released in September 1945. He wrote the navigation manual that allowed the pilots of single-handed fighter aircraft to navigate across Europe and back using kneeboard navigation similar to that which he had used in the Pacific.

At the end of the war, he stayed in the United Kingdom. He purchased 15,000 surplus Air Ministry maps, initially pasting them onto boards and making jigsaw puzzles out of them, and later founded his own successful map-making company.

=== Yachtsman ===
In 1958, Chichester was diagnosed with terminal lung cancer. (This might have been a misdiagnosis; David Lewis, a London doctor, who competed against Chichester in the first solo trans-Atlantic race, reviewed his case and called Chichester's abnormality a "lung abscess".) His wife Sheila put him on a strict vegetarian diet (now considered to be a macrobiotic diet) and his cancer went into remission. Chichester then turned to long-distance yachting.

In 1960, he entered and won the first Single-Handed Trans-Atlantic Race, which had been founded by 'Blondie' Hasler, in the 40 foot ocean racing yawl Gipsy Moth III. He came second in the second race four years later.

On 27 August 1966 Chichester sailed his ketch Gipsy Moth IV from Plymouth in the United Kingdom and returned there after 226 days of sailing on 28 May 1967, having circumnavigated the globe, with one stop (in Sydney). By doing so, he became the first person to achieve a true circumnavigation of the world solo from West to East via the great Capes. The voyage was also a race against the clock, as Chichester wanted to beat the typical times achieved by the fastest fully crewed clipper ships during the heyday of commercial sail in the 19th century. (Note: The first recorded solo circumnavigation of the globe was achieved by Joshua Slocum in 1898 but it took him three years with numerous stops – Slocum also took up the harder challenge of sailing east to west, against the prevailing wind. Also, The Argentinian Vito Dumas is said to have circumnavigated in 1942–1943. Sir Alec Rose completed a circumnavigation in 1967–1968. In 1968–1969 Robin Knox-Johnston completed the first single-handed non-stop circumnavigation.) His global voyage was the first to be commercially sponsored, with the International Wool Secretariat's Woolmark featured on the bows of Gipsy Moth IV and Chichester's cricket cap.

=== Honours and later life ===
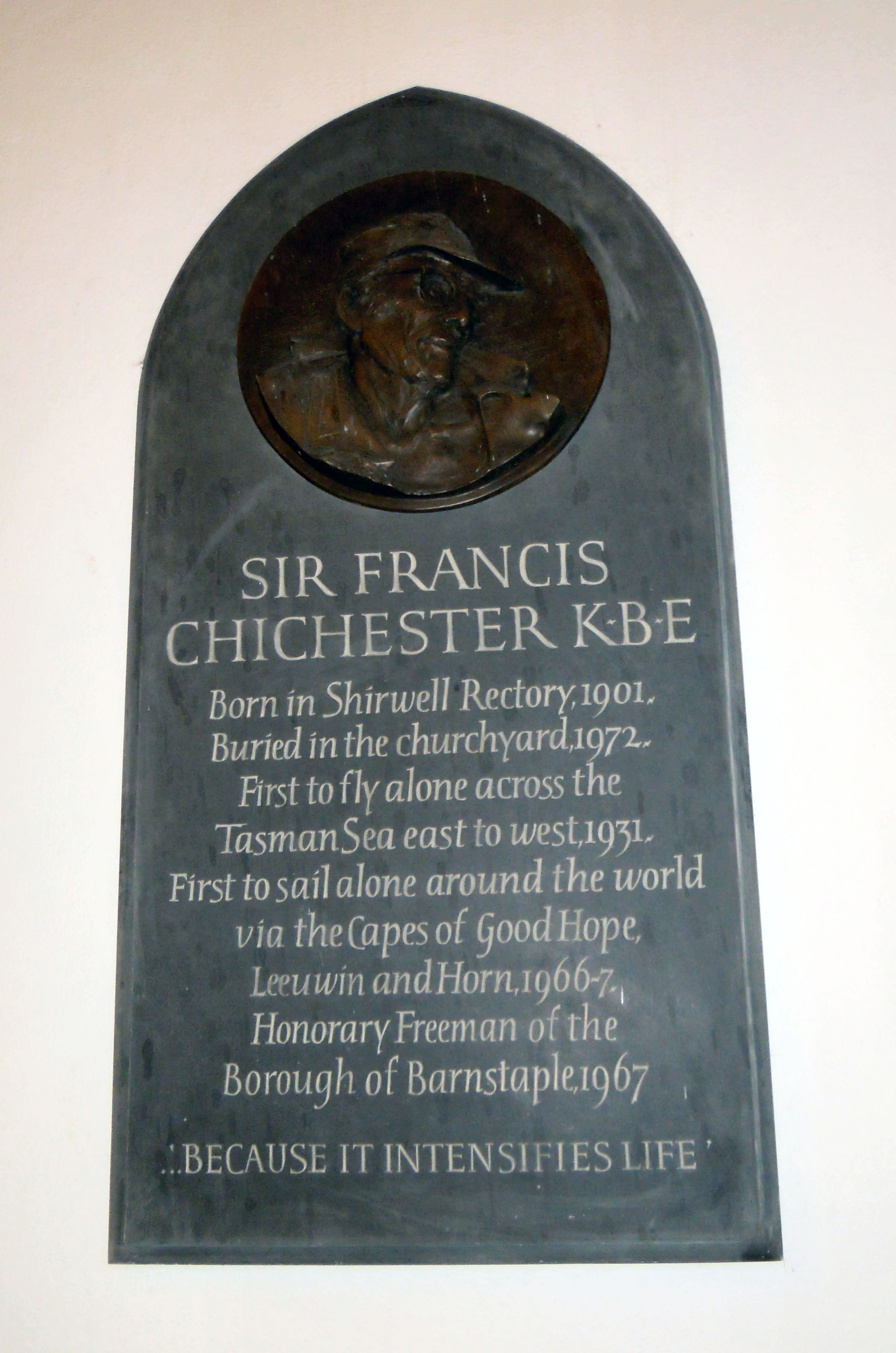
Memorial to Francis Chichester in St Peter's church, Shirwell

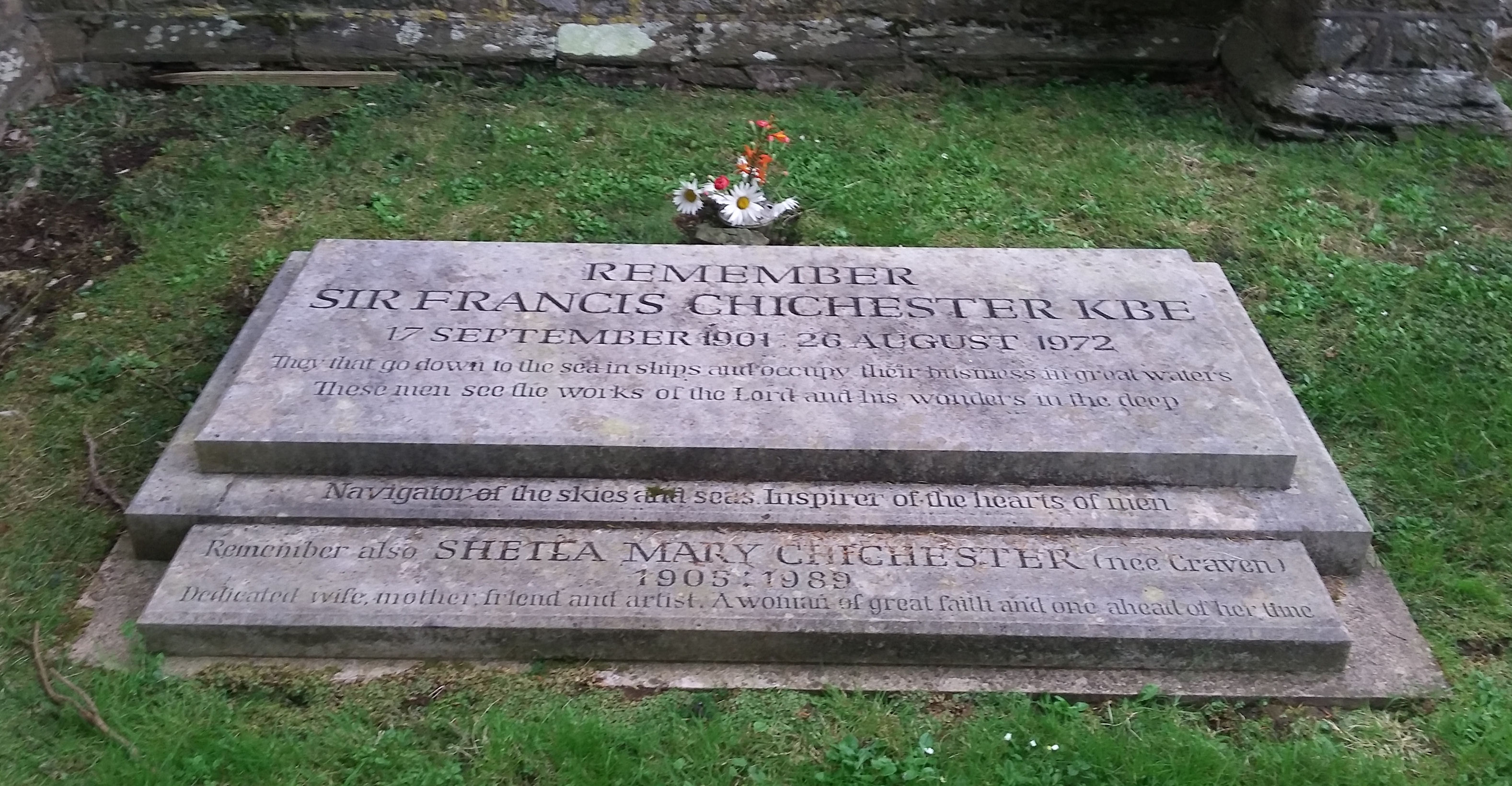
The grave of Francis Chichester in the churchyard of St Peter's Church in Shirwell, Devon

In 1961, he was awarded the Harold Spencer-Jones Gold Medal by the Royal Institute of Navigation in recognition of his contributions to navigation.

In July 1967, a few weeks after his solo circumnavigation, Chichester was knighted, being appointed a Knight Commander of the Order of the British Empire for "individual achievement and sustained endeavour in the navigation and seamanship of small craft". For the ceremony, the Queen used the sword used by her predecessor Queen Elizabeth I to knight the adventurer Sir Francis Drake, the first Englishman with his crew to complete a circumnavigation. Gipsy Moth IV was preserved alongside the Cutty Sark at Greenwich.

Also in 1967, Sir Francis Chichester was made an Honorary Bencher of the Middle Temple after his solo circumnavigation of the globe in 1966–67. An occasional table, located in the Prince's Room, commemorates Chichester's association with the Inn. It is made from the teak forehatch of Gypsy Moth IV, his own craft, and contains an aeronautical chart of the South Atlantic. The hatch cover from his yacht is also displayed in the Prince's Room.

Chichester was also honoured in 1967 by a newly issued 1/9d (one shilling and nine pence) postage stamp, which showed him aboard Gipsy Moth IV. This went against an unwritten tradition of the General Post Office, because Chichester was neither a member of the royal family nor dead when the stamp was issued.

In 1968, when Donald Crowhurst was trying to win the Sunday Times Golden Globe Race, a single-handed round-the-world event, it was Chichester who dismissed Crowhurst's wildly exaggerated reports of his own progress, which had fooled many enthusiastic supporters.

In 1970, Chichester attempted to sail 4,000 miles in twenty days, in Gipsy Moth V, but failed by one day.

Chichester died of cancer in Plymouth, Devon, on 26 August 1972, and was buried in the church of his ancestors, St Peter's Church in Shirwell, near Barnstaple. His widow died in 1989 and is buried with him.

== Family ==
Sir Francis Chichester had two sons, George and Giles. His older son George died in 1968 of an asthma attack. His younger son, Giles Chichester, was for many years a British politician, and Conservative Member of the European Parliament for South West England and Gibraltar.

== Portrayals ==
Chichester is played by Simon McBurney in the 2017 film The Mercy, the story of amateur sailor Donald Crowhurst competing in the Sunday Times Golden Globe Race in 1968.

== Other posthumous honours ==
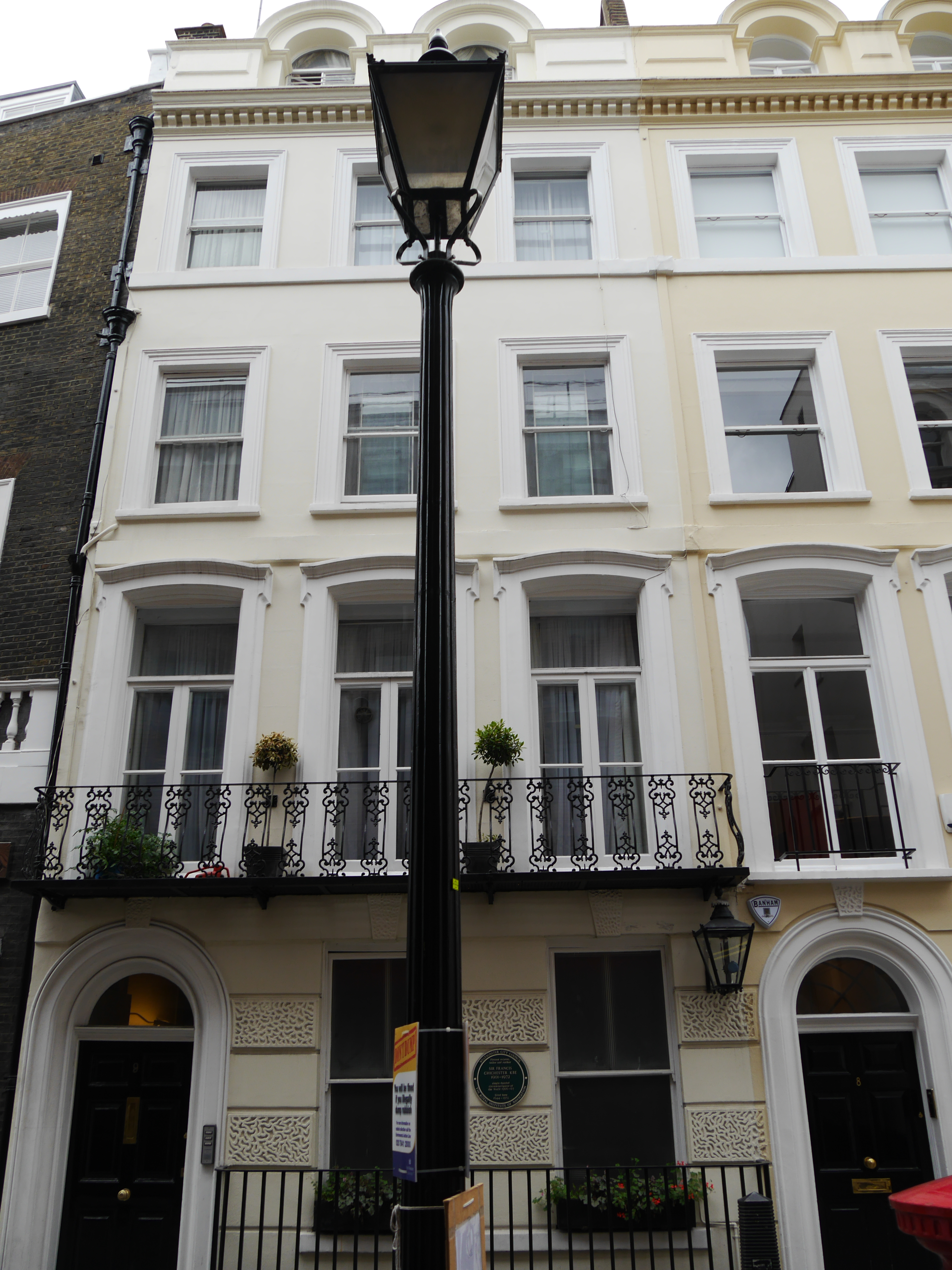
9 St James's Place, London, September 2016

Norfolk Island issued a stamp, (2c) in 1981, commemorating the first landing of an aircraft on the Island, Chichester's Gipsy Moth Madame Elijah, at Cascade Bay on 28 March 1931. Another stamp (14 cents) was issued by Norfolk Island in 1974 showing Chichester's seaplane. Australia Post issued a Pre Stamped Envelope in 1981 commemorating the Tasman Flight. Great Britain issued a further stamp (47p) in 2003 featuring Chichester. Additionally both Palau and Qatar have issued stamps featuring Chichester.

A memorial plaque to Chichester was unveiled at the family home at 9 St James's Place, SW1 in September 1993.

== Bibliography ==
- Observer's Books Nos. 3–5 with sub-titles of Solo to Sydney (1932), Seaplane Solo (1933) and Ride the Wind (1936). These books cover the England – Sydney flight, the New Zealand – Australia flight, and Sydney – Japan flight respectively.
- Astro-Navigation Parts I, II, III and IV (1940)
- Dead Reckoning Navigation (with co-authors of W. J. D. Allan and William Alexander) – Observer's Book
- Maps, Charts and Navigation (with the same co-authors of Allen and Alexander – Observer's Book)
- Planisphere of Air Navigation Stars – Observer's Book
- The Spotter's Handbook. WWII aviation identification
- Pinpoint the Bomber – Game to teach map reading
- The Star Compass
- The Pocket Plansiphere
- Night and Fire Spotting (1941)
- Star Recognition (1943). Identification of major stars for navigation with one labelled and one unlabelled star chart
- Solo To Sydney (1930 & 1982). Flying from England to Sydney, Australia
- Ride on the Wind (1936 & 1967). Flying from Sydney to Japan
- The Sun Compass
- Alone Across the Atlantic (1961). Sailing over the Atlantic
- Atlantic Adventure (1962) More Atlantic sailing
- Alone Over the Tasman Sea (1945, 1966) originally published as "Seaplane Solo" (1933). Flying from New Zealand to Australia via Norfolk and Lord Howe Islands
- The Lonely Sea and the Sky (1964). Autobiography
- Along The Clipper Way (1966 & 1967) (anthology of sailing stories)
- Gipsy Moth Circles the World (1967). England–Sydney–England solo sailing voyage
- How to Keep Fit (1969). Fitness
- The Romantic Challenge (1971). An attempt on a sailing record
