= Church of St Peter, Shirwell =

Church in Devon, England

Coordinates: 51.1190°N 4.0048°W

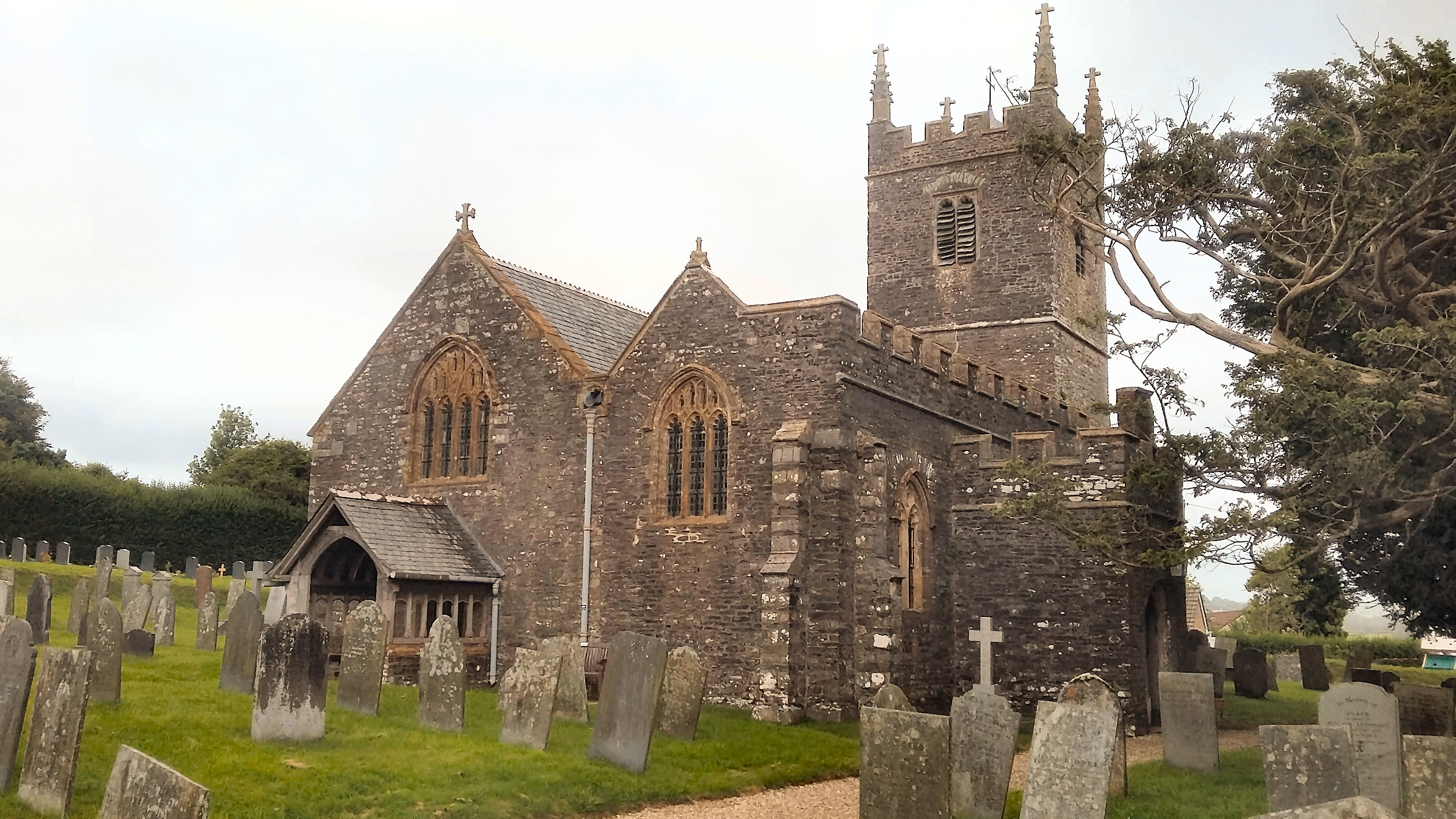
St Peter's church in Shirwell

The Church of St Peter is the 13th-century Anglican parish church for the village of Shirwell in North Devon. It is a Grade I listed building and comes under the Diocese of Exeter. The family church of the Chichester Family who lived locally, the aviator and sailor Sir Francis Chichester, who was born in Shirwell, is buried in the churchyard.

== History ==
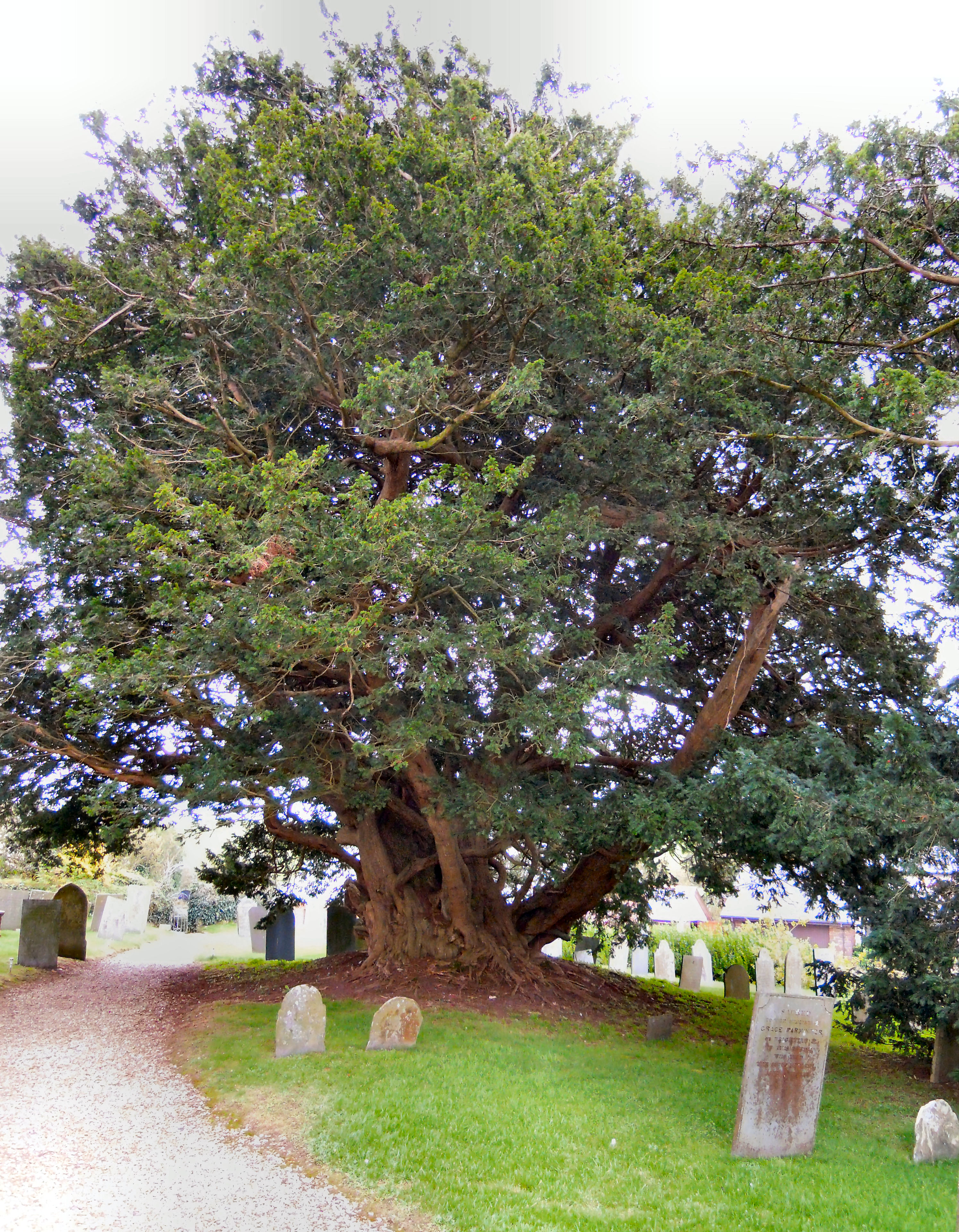
One of the two ancient yew trees in the churchyard

The parish of Shirwell was originally an Anglo-Saxon ‘Hundred’ and is one of the oldest ecclesiastically appointed Deaneries in the Exeter Diocese. The two yew trees opposite the south porch were thought to be 13th-century, making them as old as the oldest part of the present church on the site. However, a survey by the Yew Tree Campaign states that they are actually 1,500 years old which means they probably date to a church on the site which predates the present one.

== Design ==
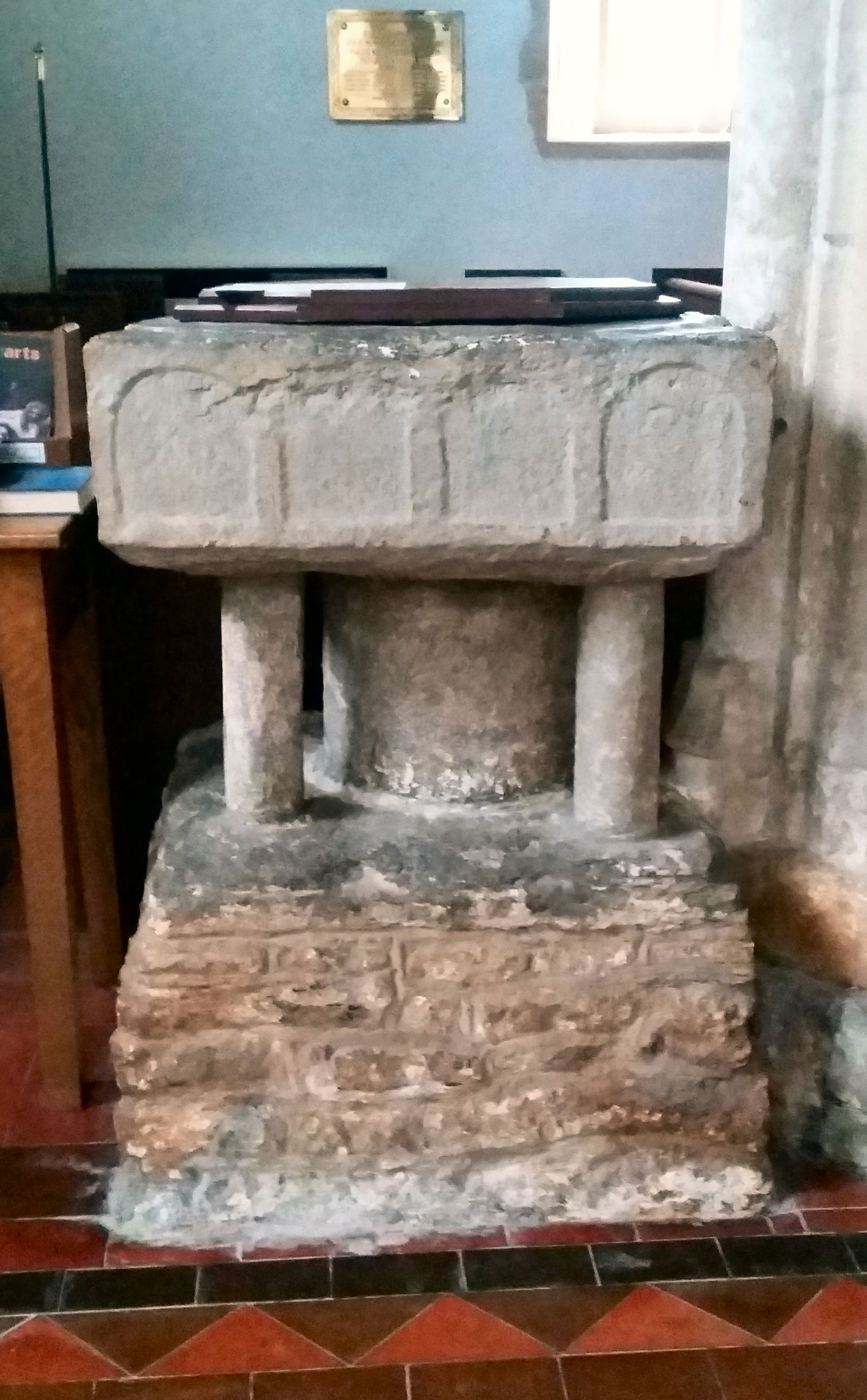
The baptismal font is 12th-century Norman

The church is built with coursed shale rubble with freestone dressings and with windows of Hamhill stone and a slate roof. The embattled parapet to the tower, the south aisle and the porch were added when 'This church was beautified in ye year of Our Lord 1704' according to an inscription over the south porch. The four pinnacles at the summit of the tower were added in the 19th century. The tower, chancel arch, parts of the chancel and the priest's door to the vestry are 13th-century in date. while the rest of the chancel is of the 14th century. The original rood screen dated to c. 1500 but was removed in 1847. The present screen of four bays was installed in 1912.

The roof of the nave is wagon-shaped with open timbers and dates to the late 19th-century but may incorporate some earlier timbers. The nave is separated from the South aisle by one narrow and three wide bays. The aisle is of the Perpendicular period having been added between 1560 and 1590. The tops of the columns are decorated with leaves, shields and faces on the capitals. The column nearest the baptismal font has the date 1620 on the capital; as the column is no later than 1590 in date it is not known to what this date is referring.

The font itself, which is of the Norman period, dates to the late 12th-century and so predates the church in which it sits; it has a square bowl sitting on a round stem and supporting pillars with four flat blank arches to each side of the top. In this font was baptised Saint Cuthbert Mayne (1544–1577), the first English Roman Catholic "seminary priest" to be martyred under the laws of Elizabeth I. Mayne was beatified "equipollently" by Pope Leo XIII, by means of a decree of 29 December 1886 and was canonized along with the other Martyrs of England and Wales by Pope Paul VI on 25 October 1970.

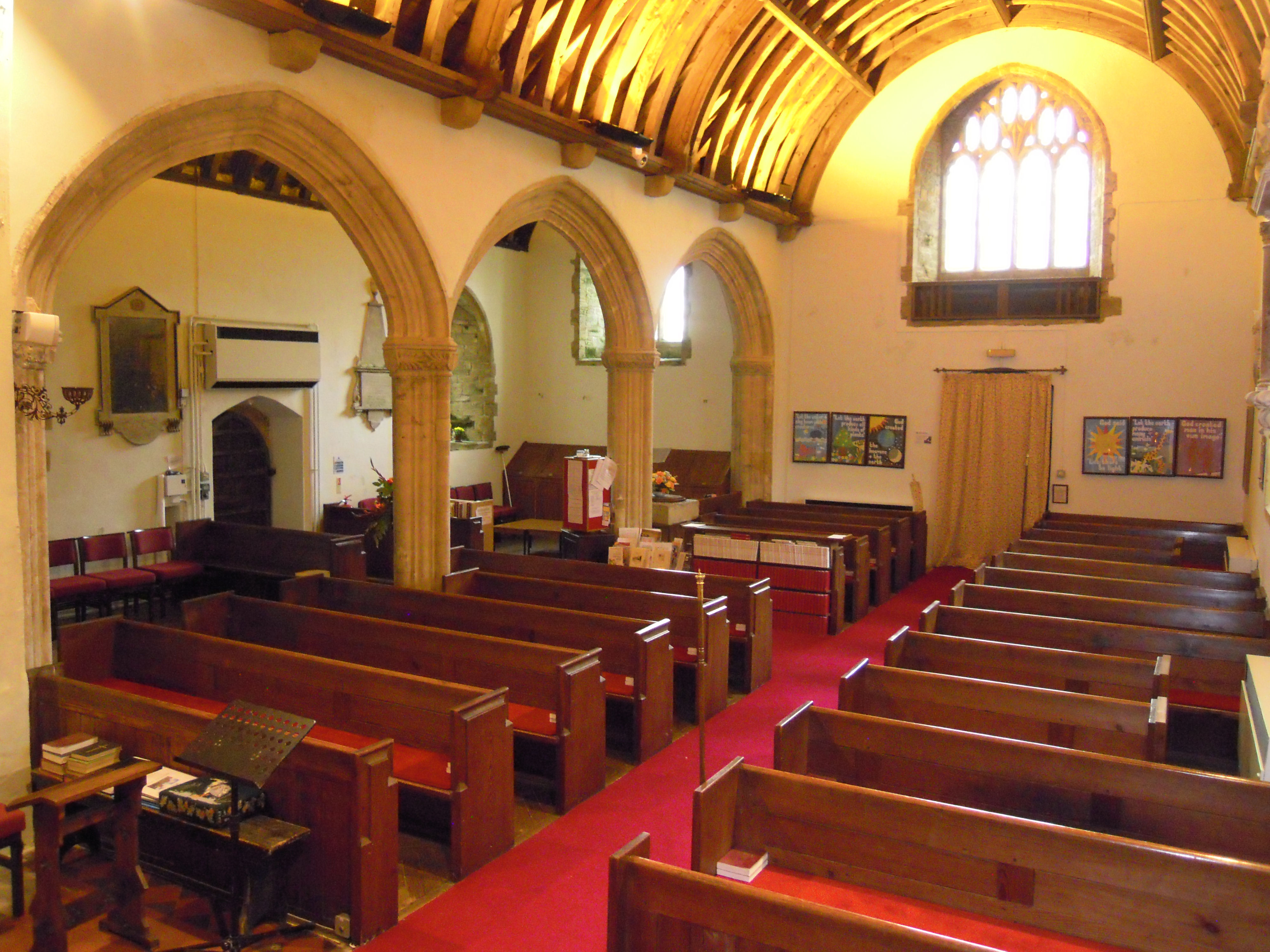
A view down the nave of St Peter's church

The south aisle, north transept and the top stages of the tower are of the 15th century. The south aisle was cleared of pews in 2005 and leads to the open belfry which holds the six bells. The present set of bells were cast and hung in 1733 and are by William Evans of Chepstow. They were removed and retuned by the Whitechapel Bell Foundry in 1986. The church underwent a Victorian restoration in the Perpendicular style including most of the fenestration and a vestry by the architect William White between 1873 and 1889. During the restoration twenty burial vaults were discovered beneath the church. The piscina in the South wall is trefoil-headed with a carved face between the drainage holes. The communion rails, iron work, tiles, reredos and screen date to 1912 and are by Herbert Read Snr. The reredos depicts four carved figures which represent St Peter holding the Keys to Heaven; the Virgin Mary carrying lilies; St Martin armed with a sword and St John holding a quill and with an eagle at his feet. In the North transept is a rare 15th-century wooden arch and rough-hewn timber pier of square section as if for a hagioscope from the nave.

== Monuments and glass ==
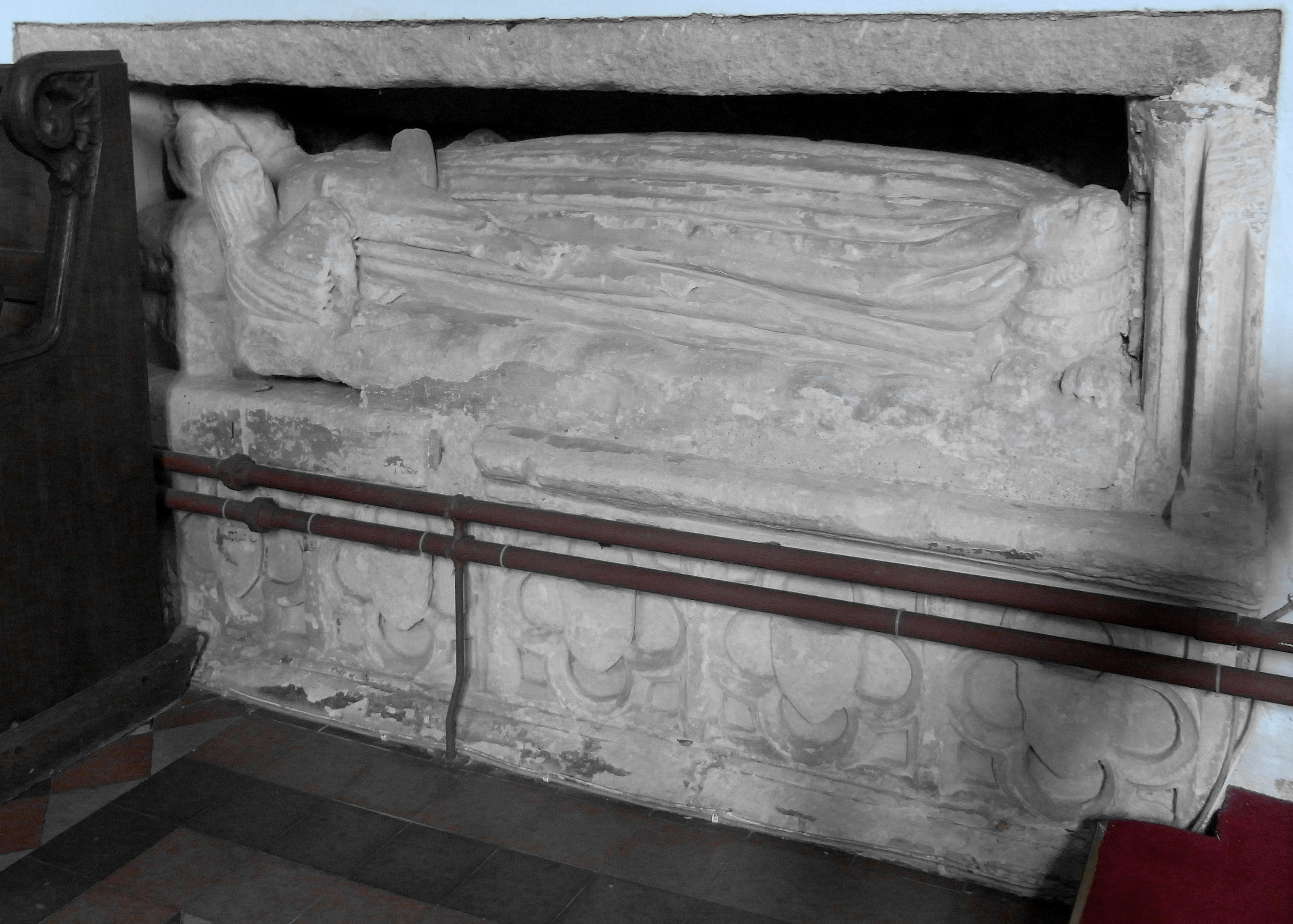
Effigy of Blanche St. Leger (d.1483)

In a recess with quatrefoil decoration in the North chancel wall is an unrestored 15th-century effigy of a lady, possibly of Blanche St. Leger (d. 1483) on a tomb chest. The recess is much too low for the monument which was probably moved here from elsewhere in the church. Above this is a monument to Lady Anne Chichester (d. 1723). Other 18th-century monuments survive in the church. The glass in the East window was installed in 1898 and is by Charles Eamer Kempe; it is dedicated to the Revd. John James Chichester (1825-1894), Rector of Shirwell. The uncoloured glass in rectangular and diamond patterns in other windows in the church is by William White. Here also is a memorial plaque to the aviator and sailor Sir Francis Chichester, who was born in the Rectory in the village and who is also buried in the churchyard.

The church of St Peter in Shirwell has been a Grade I listed building since 1965.

== Gallery ==
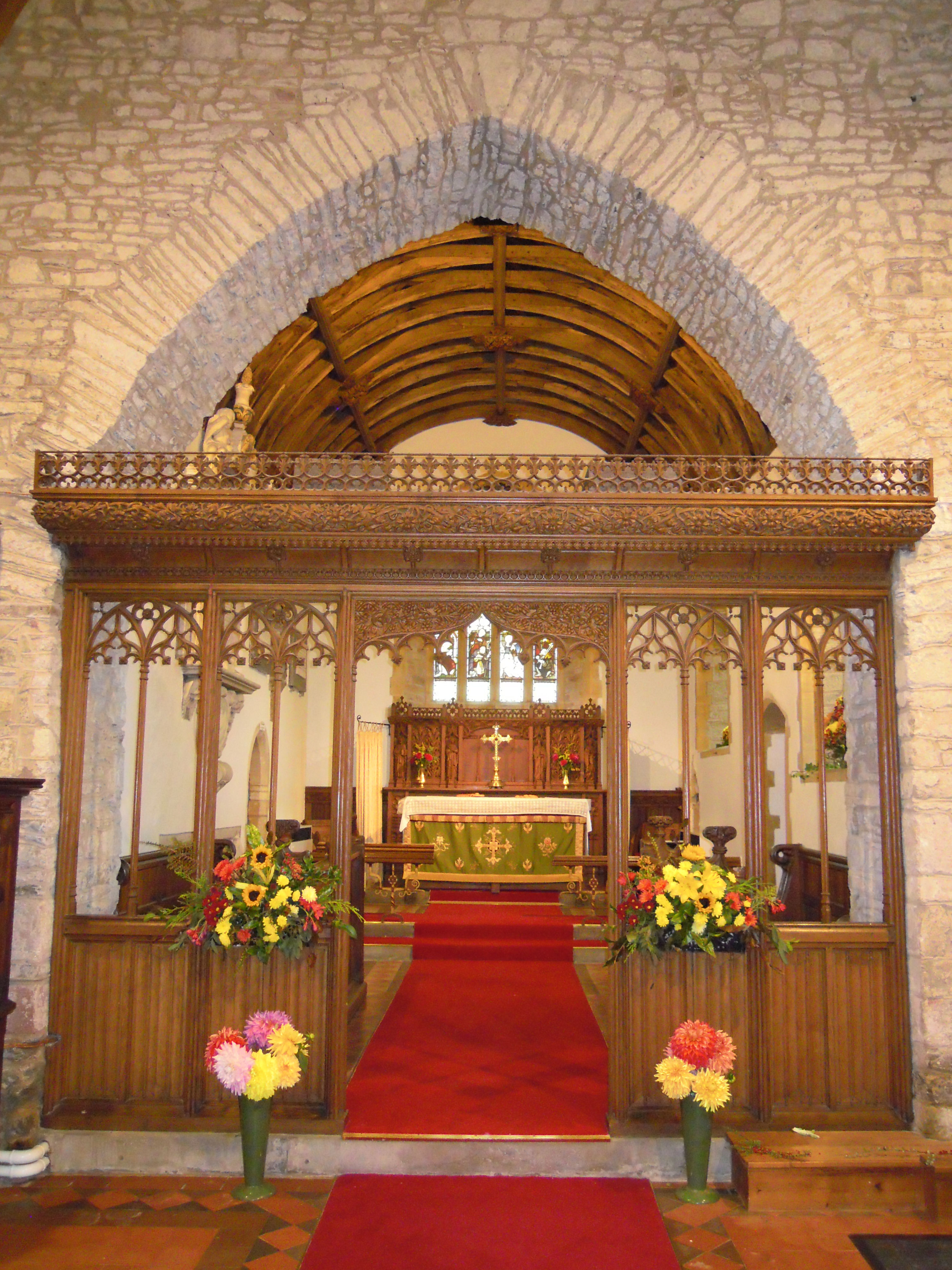
The chancel arch

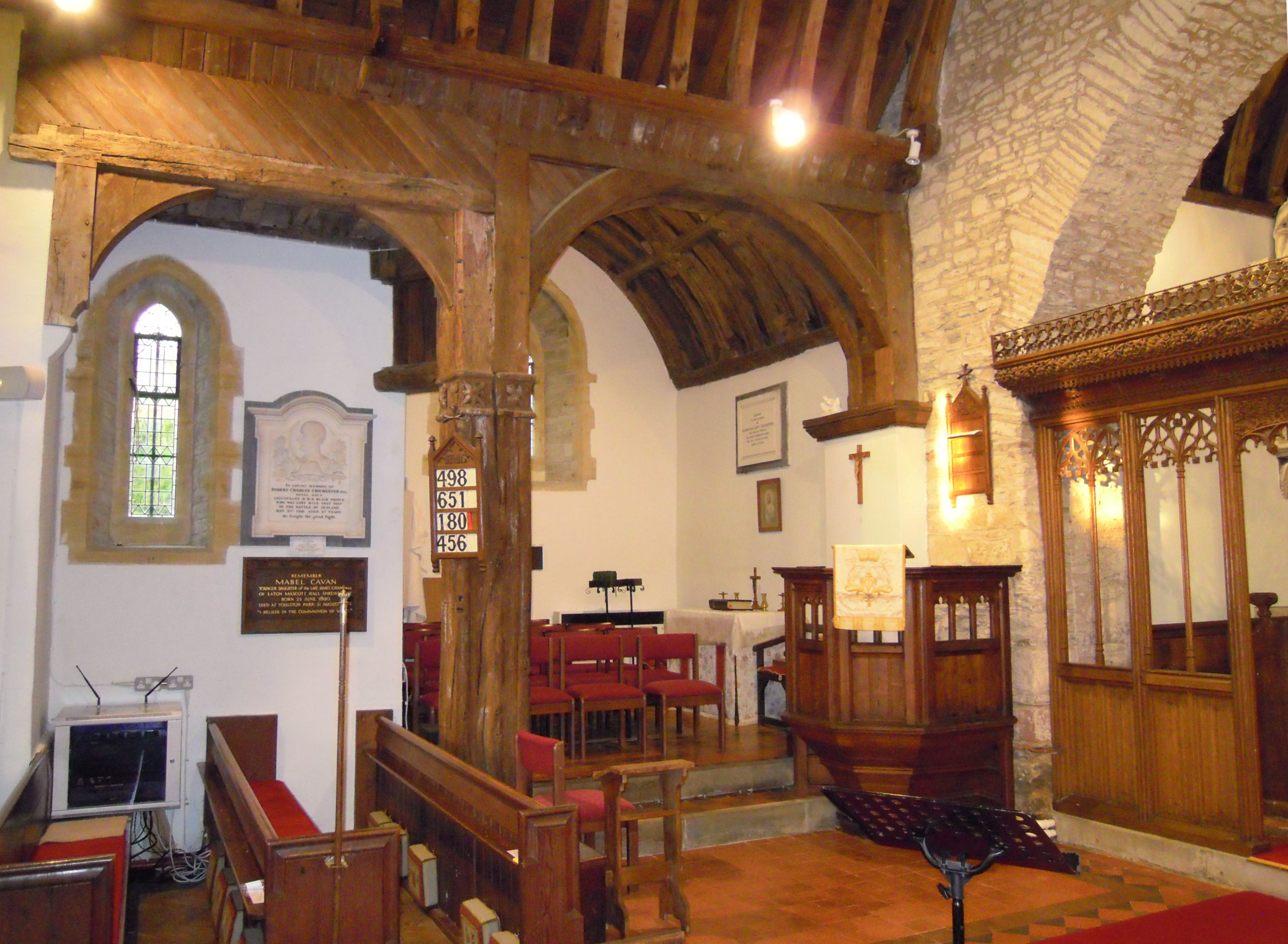
The rare 15th-century wooden arch with timber pier (centre)

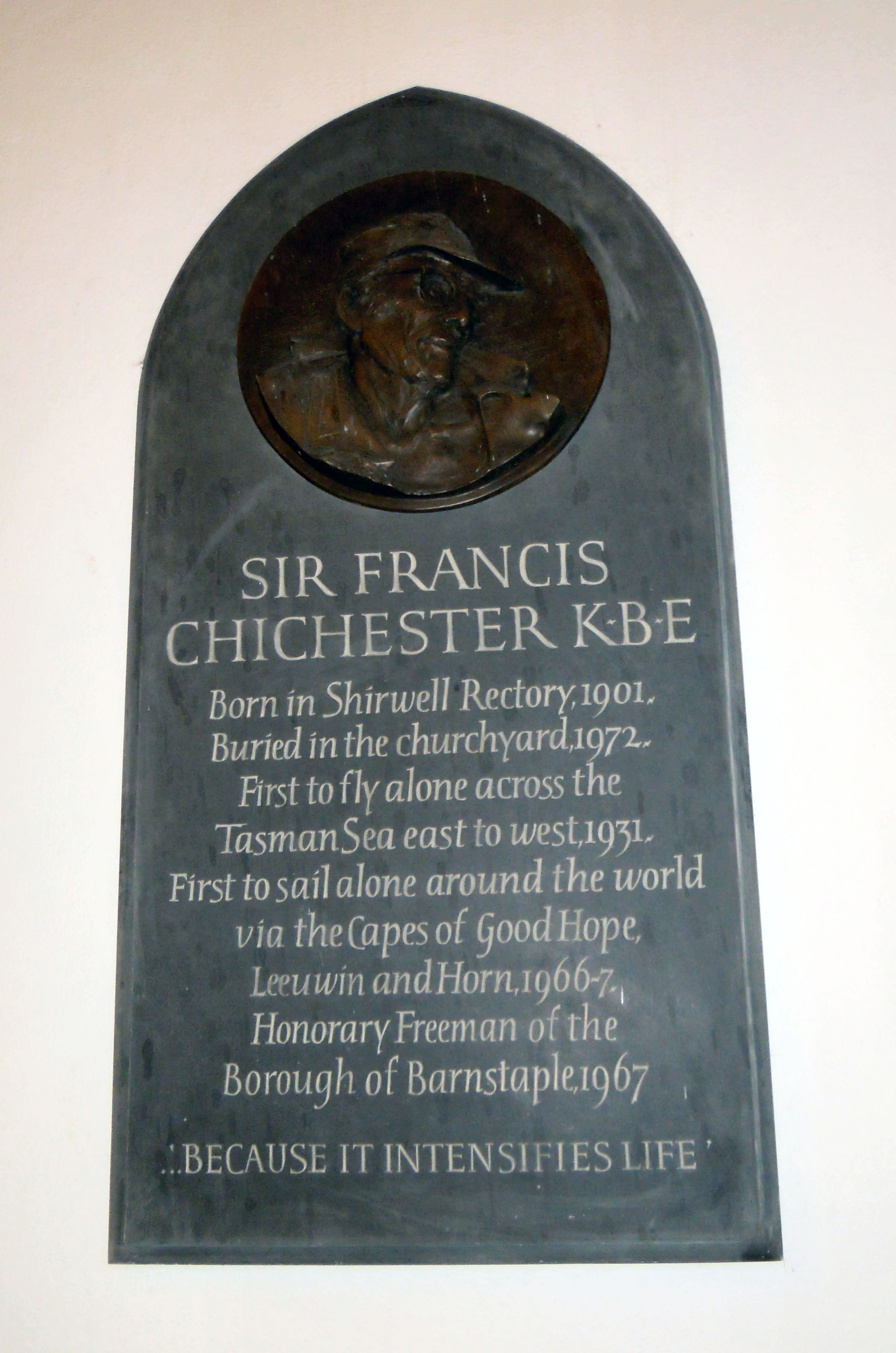
Memorial to Francis Chichester in St Peter's church, Shirwell

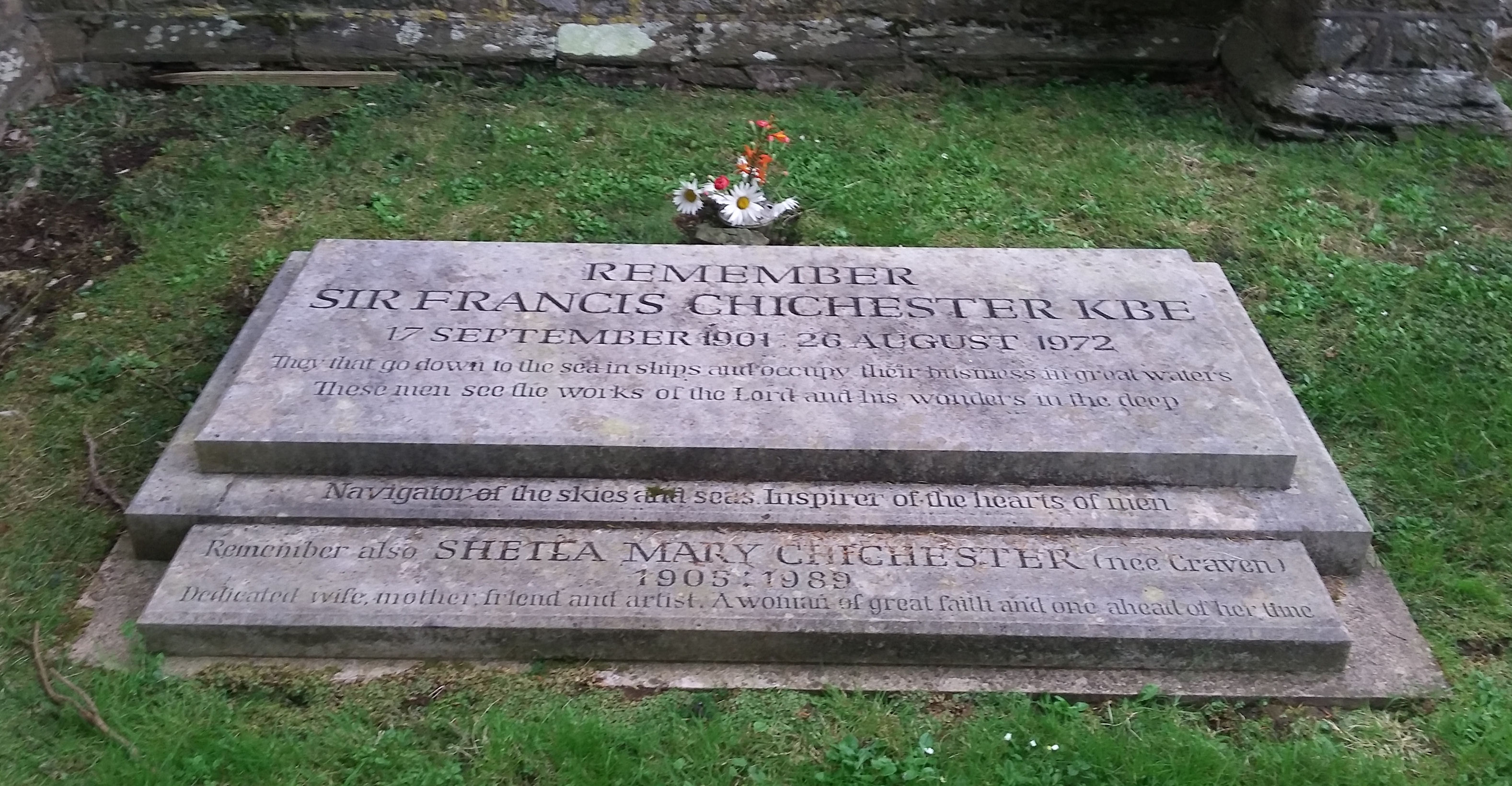
The grave of Francis Chichester in the churchyard of St Peter's

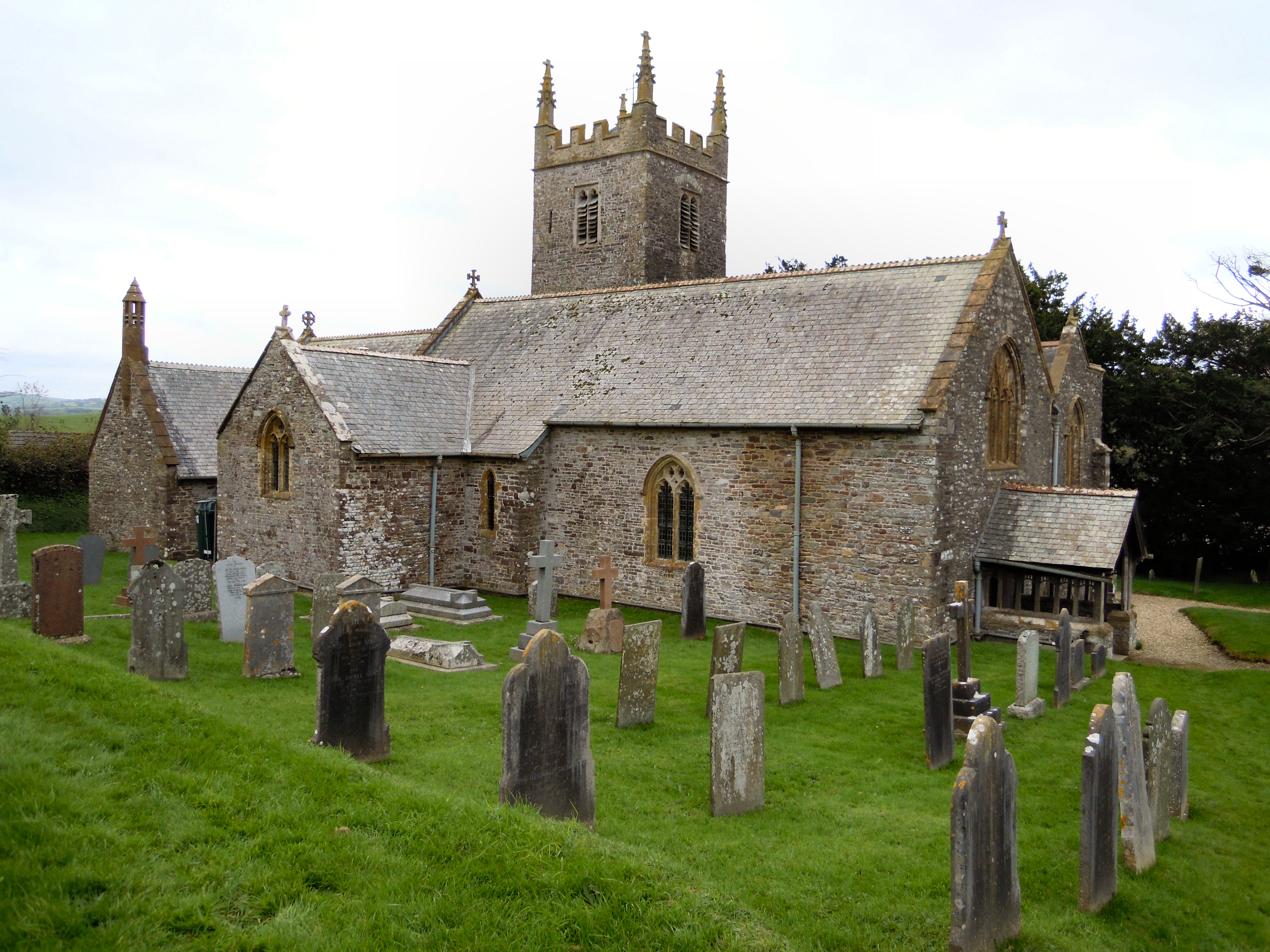
St Peter's church from the churchyard
