= Braunton Hundred =

Ancient administrative unit of Devon, England

The hundred of Braunton was the name of one of thirty two ancient administrative units of Devon, England.

The parishes in the hundred were: Ashford; Barnstaple; Berrynarbor; Bittadon; Bratton Fleming; Braunton; Combe Martin; East Buckland; East Down; Filleigh; Georgeham; Goodleigh; Heanton Punchardon; Ilfracombe; Kentisbury; Lundy; Marwood; Mortehoe; Pilton; Trentishoe; West Buckland and West Down.

== See also ==
- List of hundreds of England and Wales - Devon
