= Solo to Sydney =

Non-fiction novel by Sir Francis Chichester

- Author: Sir Francis Chichester
- Language: English
- Genre: Non-fiction
- Publication date: 1930

Solo to Sydney is a book by Sir Francis Chichester about his solo flight in the 1920s from England to Australia in a de Havilland DH.60 Moth biplane. The book was first published in 1930 and subsequent editions have been published by Stein and Day. Chichester had relatively little flying experience when he undertook this epic voyage and the book recalls his experiences in dealing with bad weather, poor, or non-existent navigational aids and maps and his journey in general. Chichester was even more famous for his yachting achievements in a series of boats he named Gypsy Moth after his airplane.
