= Pontchardon =

- Commune
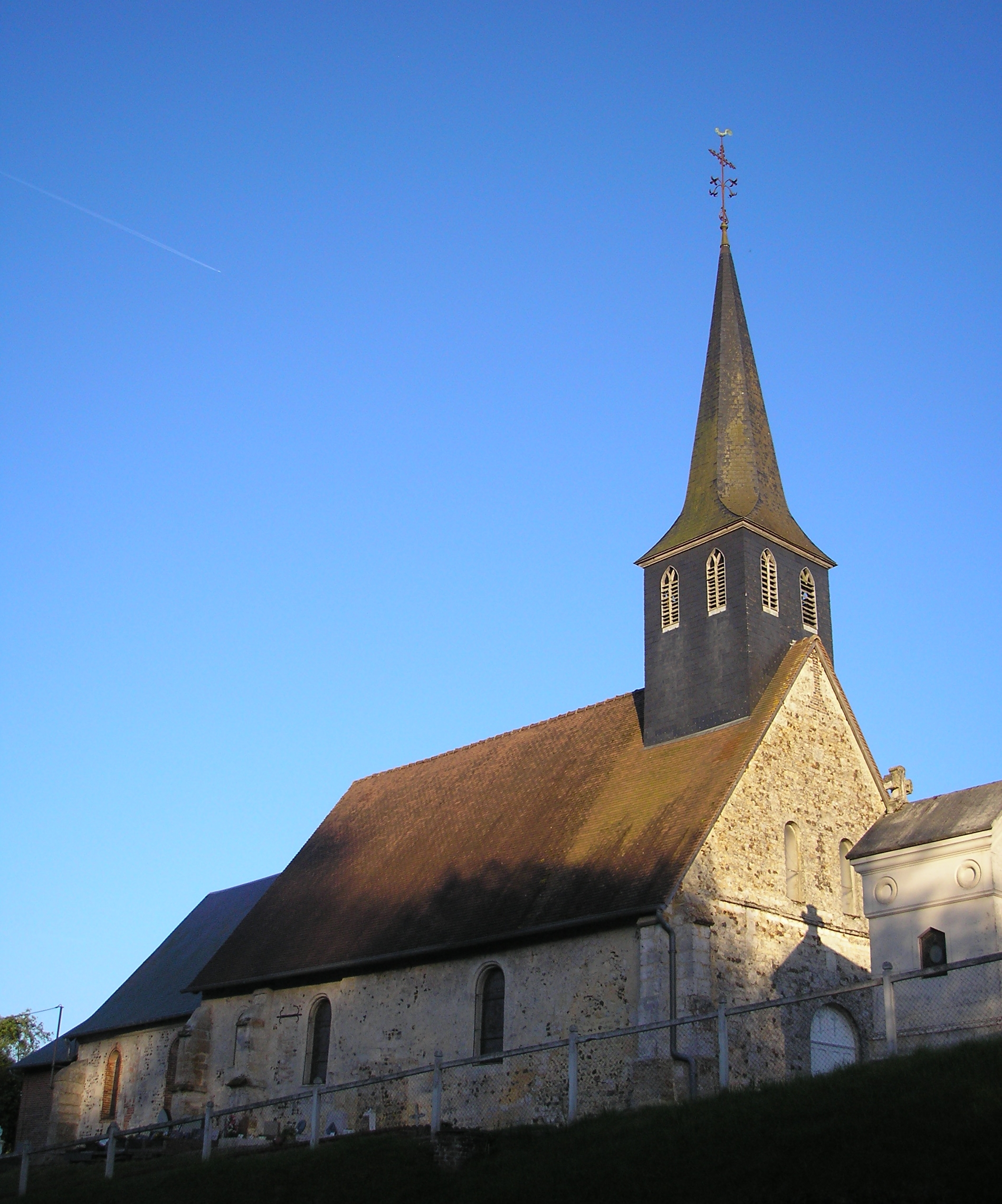
- The church in Pontchardon
- Location of Pontchardon
- Location within France Location within Normandy
- Coordinates: 48°55′46″N 0°16′02″E
- Country: France
- Region: Normandy
- Department: Orne
- Arrondissement: Mortagne-au-Perche
- Canton: Vimoutiers
- Intercommunality: Vallées d'Auge et du Merlerault

Government
  - Mayor (2020–2026): Gérard Tanguy
- Area^{1}: 4.83 km^{2} (1.86 sq mi)
- Elevation: 180 m (590 ft)
- Highest elevation: 221 m (725 ft)
- Lowest elevation: 122 m (400 ft)
- Population (2023): 192
  - Density: 39.8/km^{2} (103/sq mi)
- Time zone: UTC+01:00 (CET)
  - Summer (DST): UTC+02:00 (CEST)
- INSEE/Postal code: 61333 /61120
- ^{1} French Land Register data, which excludes lakes, ponds, glaciers > 1 km^{2} (0.386 sq mi or 247 acres) and river estuaries.

Pontchardon (French pronunciation: [pɔ̃ʃaʁdɔ̃]) is a commune in the Orne department in Normandy, north-western France.

== Geography ==
The commune is made up of the following collection of villages and hamlets, Henneval, Le Champ de la Forgé and Pontchardon.

The commune along with another 11 communes shares part of a 1,400 hectare, Natura 2000 conservation area, called the Haute Vallée de la Touques et affluents.

The Touques river flows through the commune in addition to a stream, the Ruisseau de Beauleveque.

== See also ==
- Communes of the Orne department
