= Berrynarbor =

Village and civil parish in the North Devon district of Devon, England

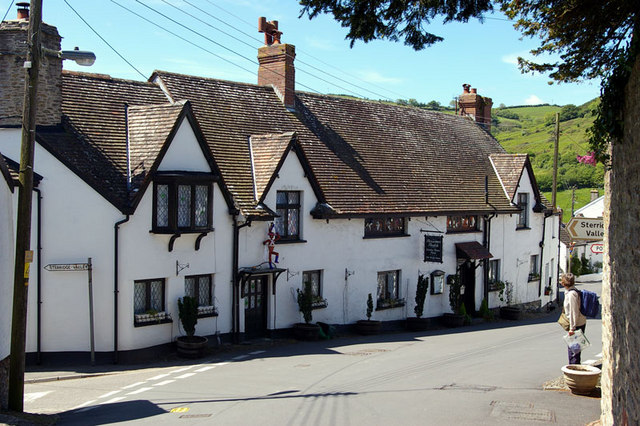

- Location within Devon
- OS grid reference: SS5647
- Shire county: Devon
- Region: South West
- Country: England
- Sovereign state: United Kingdom
- Post town: Ilfracombe
- Postcode district: EX34
- Police: Devon and Cornwall
- Fire: Devon and Somerset
- Ambulance: South Western
- UK Parliament: North Devon

Berrynarbor (historically Berry Narbor, Berrie Nerbert, etc) is a village, civil parish and former manor in the North Devon district of Devon, England. According to the 2001 census the parish had a population of 749, increasing to 802 at the 2011 census. The village is located on the north coast of the county to the north of Exmoor, about three miles east of Ilfracombe. The parish is surrounded clockwise from the east by the parishes of Combe Martin, Kentisbury, East Down, Marwood, Bittadon, and Ilfracombe. Berrynarbor has within its purview to all sides a mixture of dense woodlands and farms and lies within the North Devon Area of Outstanding Natural Beauty.

== Description ==
The village contains a small school, Berrynarbor VC Primary School which is voluntary controlled, and a voluntary controlled and run village shop. Other shops in the village's area are on the Mill Park camp-site and, during the summer, on Watermouth Valley Camping Park, which is on the scenic walk to Watermouth Harbour. There are two pubs: Ye Olde Globe which is a character village pub, and The Sawmill Inn which is on the outskirts of the village. There are guest houses and tearooms, along with the St Peter's Church in the main village square and Watermouth Castle.

St Peter's Church has a 15th-century tower, a 17th-century lychgate and a Norman font. The church tenor bell was recently restored through donations from the village and can now be heard every Sunday morning during the church service.

Berrynarbor has won many awards including Best Kept Village and Britain in Bloom. The community shop which opened in 2008 won the 2008 Countryside Alliance Award for the best village shop/post office in the South West of England. Every year the village hosts a show which involves some of the locals and primary school children. In July the school hosts a fete in the Manor hall and park. This helps raise money for various charities.

== History ==
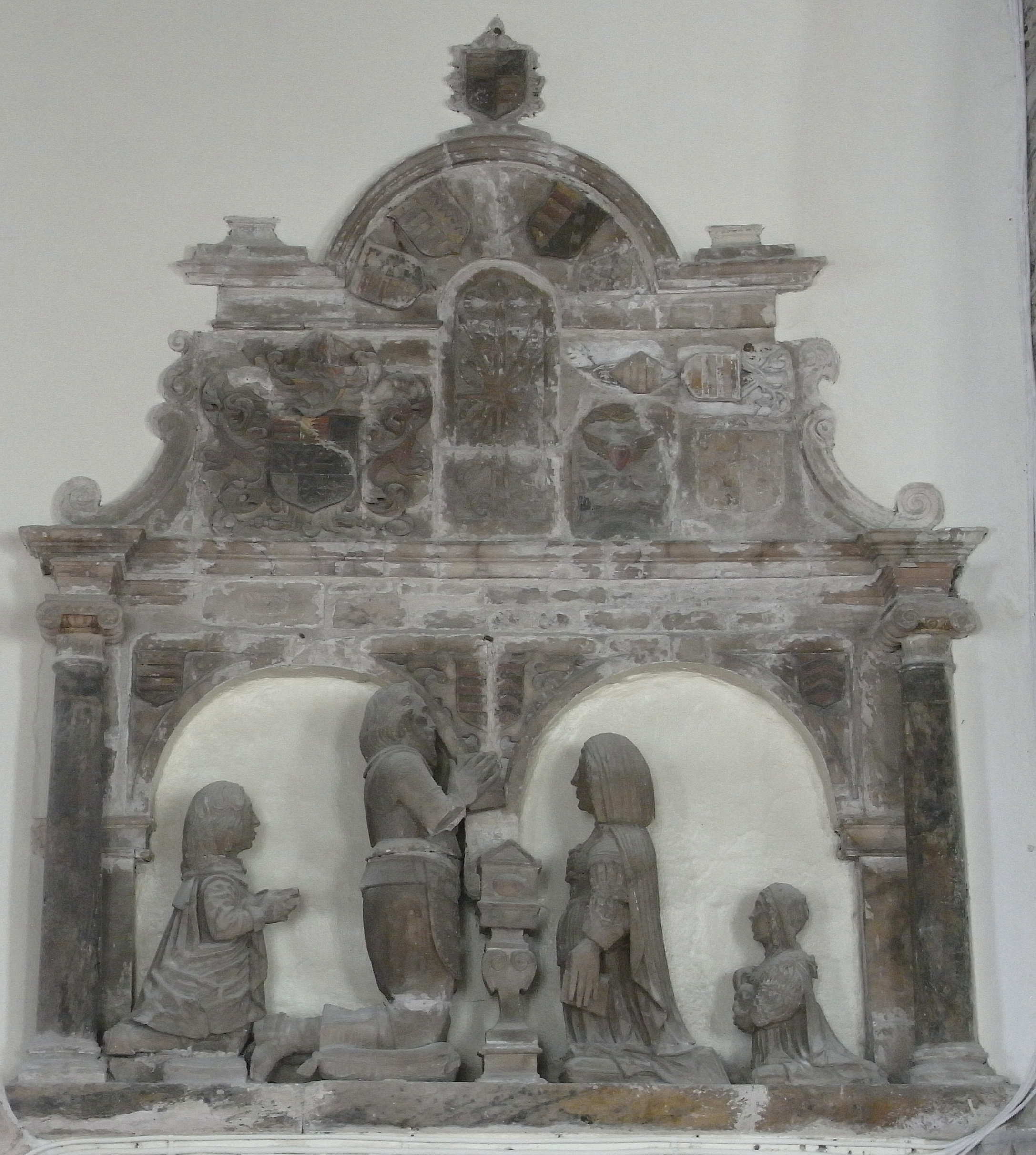
Mural monument to Richard Berrie, Berrynarbor Church

The Berrie family were lords of the manor of "Berrie Nerbert" in the 17th century, as the inscriptions on the two tablets under the Berrie mural monument witness. The manor later came into the possession of the Bassett family, previously seated at Heanton Punchardon, which in the 19th century built Watermouth Castle within the manor, for their principal residence.

== Village Newsletter ==
In 1988 a survey was carried out by the Parish Council and a need was identified for a village newsletter. The aim was for it to be "an interesting and informative publication for everyone to enjoy". Contributions could be any item of interest - village news, coming events, 'hatched, matched and despatched', or items relating to hobbies, local history, travel, favourite recipes, etc.

Over 30 years later and the Berrynarbor Newsletter is still going strong both in hard copy format - distributed to the village and to over 100 subscribers by post - and also online. The website offers a wealth of in depth social history, original artwork, stories, local knowledge, photos, postcards, and community information.

Articles can be browsed by Edition (as originally published), by Series (articles on a common topic), Regulars (articles on a range of topics from a regular contributor) or Groups (clubs, institutions, societies and groups). There is also a Search facility for locating family, friends and events.

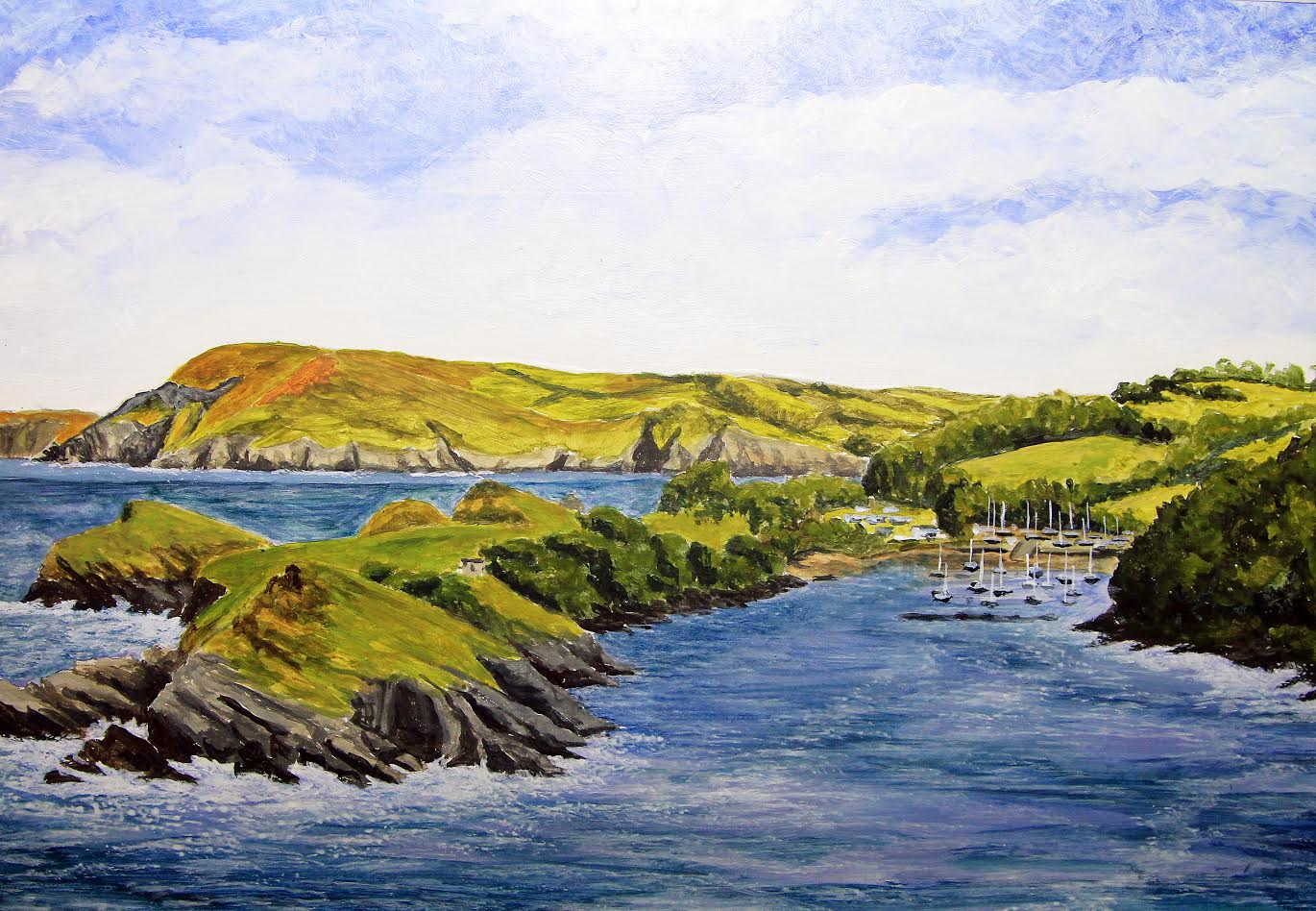
Watermouth Cove, by Paul Swailes. From Berrynarbor Newsletter Edition 168, June 2017.

The site features some stunning original artwork by four highly talented local artists: Debbie Rigler Cook, Nigel Mason, Peter Rothwell and Paul Swailes.

== Historic estates ==
The parish contains the following historic estates:

Lee
Directly adjoining the village to the north is the neighbourhood or locality of Lee, divided into Lee Wood and three main estates, few of which are subdivided as each is a relatively small mixed residential/agricultural holding Middle Lee, North Lee and South Lee. 51.200°N 04.065°W

Hagginton Hill and Goosewell
Contiguous to Lee, climbing the road to Ilfracombe in a long northern curve is a line of property forming these settlements. East Hagginton within the manor of Berrynarbor was an estate mentioned in the Domesday Book of 1086. 51.205°N 04.070°W

Steridge
Lying along the valley floor to the south is another unbroken line of properties named Steridge, connected to the main village centre, occupying the lower Steridge Valley slightly higher than the village. Steep wooded slopes here give rise to springs, and on one eastern slope is the park homes resort/retreat of Berrynarbor Park here. 51.195°N 04.070°W

Watermouth
To the north becomes a substantial hamlet in holiday season and its wide sandy outlet, as the name implies is directly beneath its castle. Watermouth Castle here is a Grade II* listed country home, started 1825-6 with final works 1845 by George Wightwick. The Bassett family mentioned above sold this in 1946 to assist in paying an inheritance tax bill. 51.215°N 04.065°W

Bowden
Now a farmhouse, was the birthplace of John Jewel (1522-1571), Bishop of Salisbury.
