= Heanton Punchardon =

Village in Devon, England

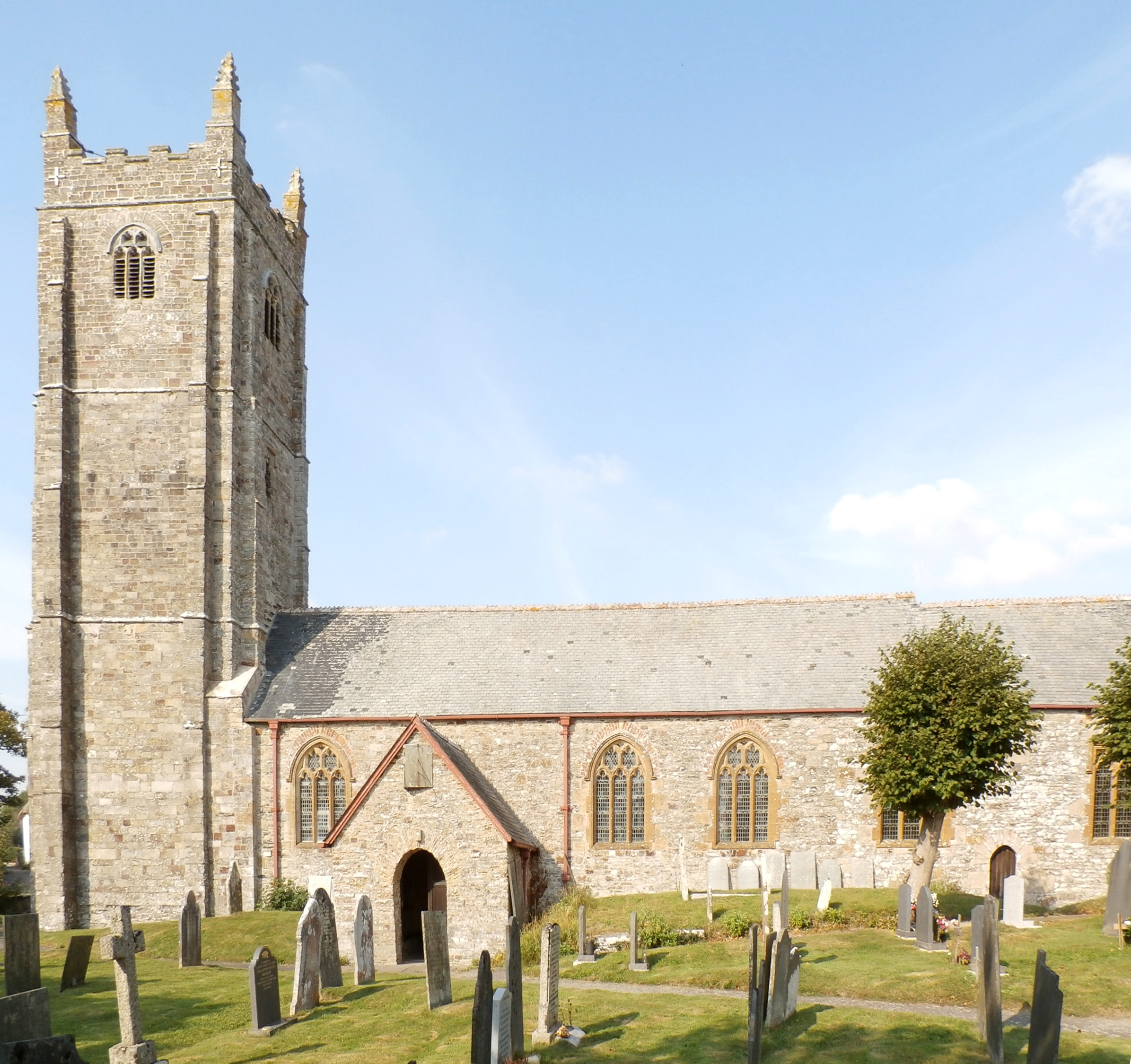
- St Augustine's Church, Heanton Punchardon

- Location within Devon
- Population: 2,406 (2011 census)
- OS grid reference: SS5035
- District: North Devon
- Shire county: Devon
- Region: South West
- Country: England
- Sovereign state: United Kingdom
- Post town: BARNSTAPLE
- Postcode district: EX31
- Police: Devon and Cornwall
- Fire: Devon and Somerset
- Ambulance: South Western
- UK Parliament: North Devon

Heanton Punchardon (/ˈhɛntən/ /pʌnˈtʃɑːrdən/) is a village, civil parish and former manor, anciently part of Braunton Hundred. It is situated directly east-southeast of the village of Braunton, in North Devon. The parish lies on the north bank of the estuary of the River Taw and it is surrounded, clockwise from the north, by the parishes of Braunton, Marwood, Ashford and across the estuary, Fremington. The population was 418 in 1801 and 404 in 1901. (Note: Figures for other years are available on the local studies website.) Its largest localities are Wrafton and Chivenor. The surrounding area is also an electoral ward with a total population at the 2011 census of 2,673.

== St Augustine's Church ==
The parish is within Barnstaple Deanery for ecclesiastical purposes. The parish church is dedicated to St Augustine of Canterbury, who brought Christianity to England in 597 AD. It is a Grade I listed building and has three listed monuments in its churchyard. Parts date to about the 13th century. It has a bell-tower at the west end, with embattled parapet with crocketted corner pinnacles. The nave contains Tudor arched doorways and a five-bay arcade. The sundial over the south porch, dated 1795, is by John and Thomas Berry.

An ornate Easter Sepulchre tomb in the chancel is to Richard Coffin (1456–1523), Sheriff of Devon in 1511. The church has monuments to the Ballyman family and to the Basset family, lords of the manor, situated in the Basset Chapel, at the east end of the north aisle, now almost fully occupied by the organ.

=== Commonwealth War Graves ===
Heanton Punchardon is one mile from Chivenor and during World War II, the parish church, St. Augustine's churchyard was enlarged to accommodate a war graves plot on new ground. The churchyard contains two burials of the First World War and 85 from the Second World War. It also has 38 post-war Royal Air Force burials and one Italian war grave. In total it has 126 active military personnel graves.

== Heanton Court ==
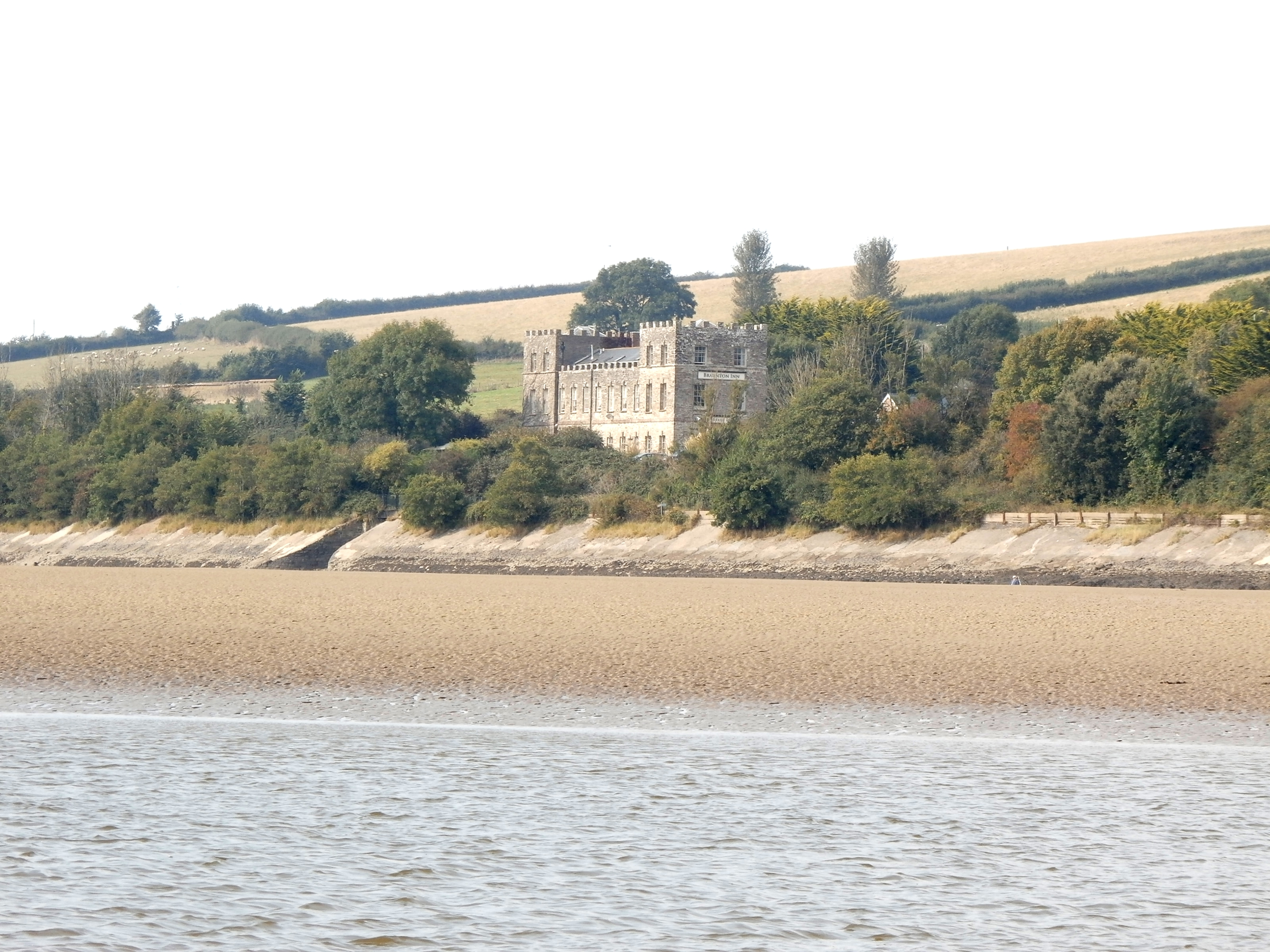
Heanton Court, former manor house of Heanton Punchardon, viewed from south at Penhill Point across the estuary of the River Taw at low tide

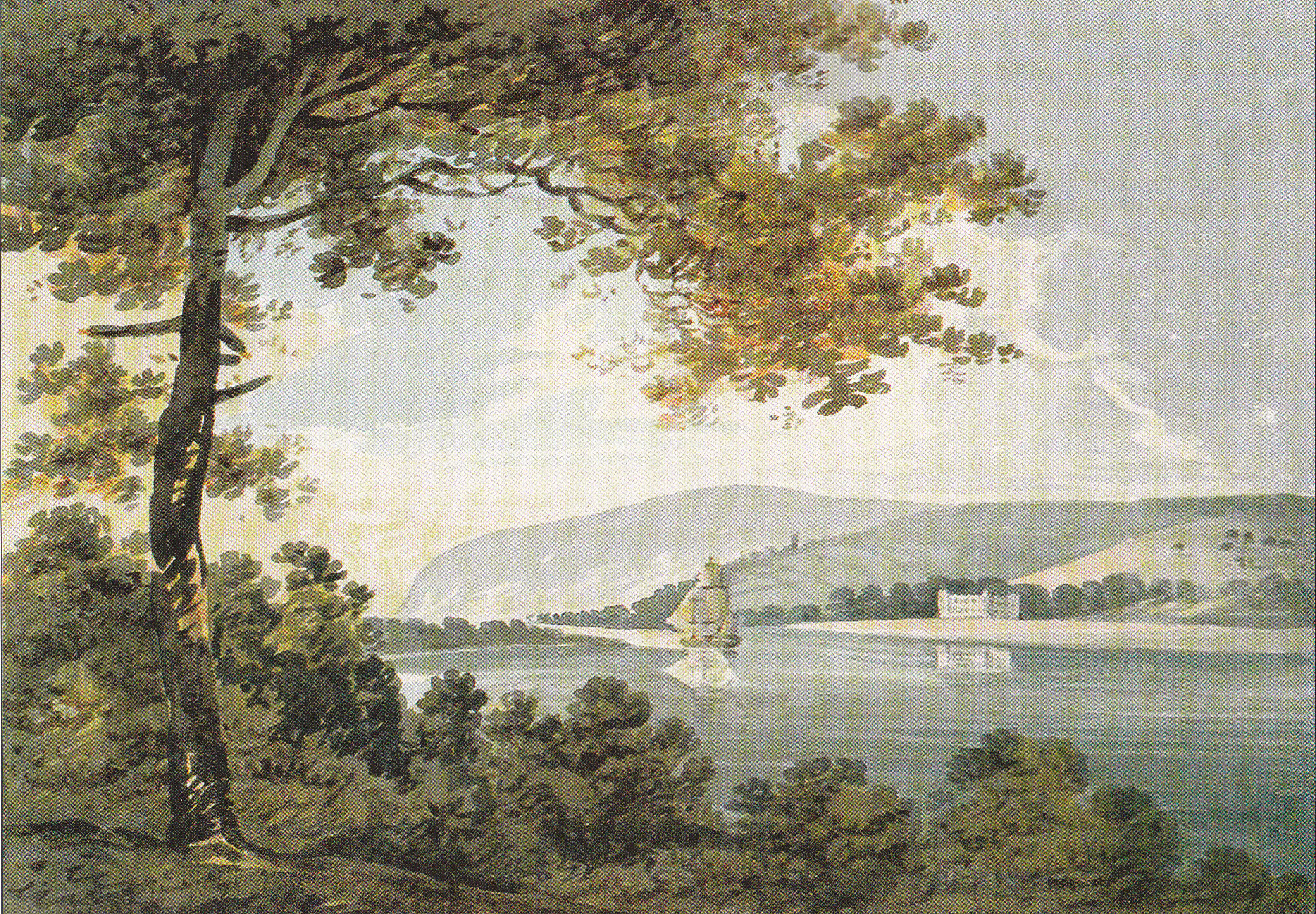
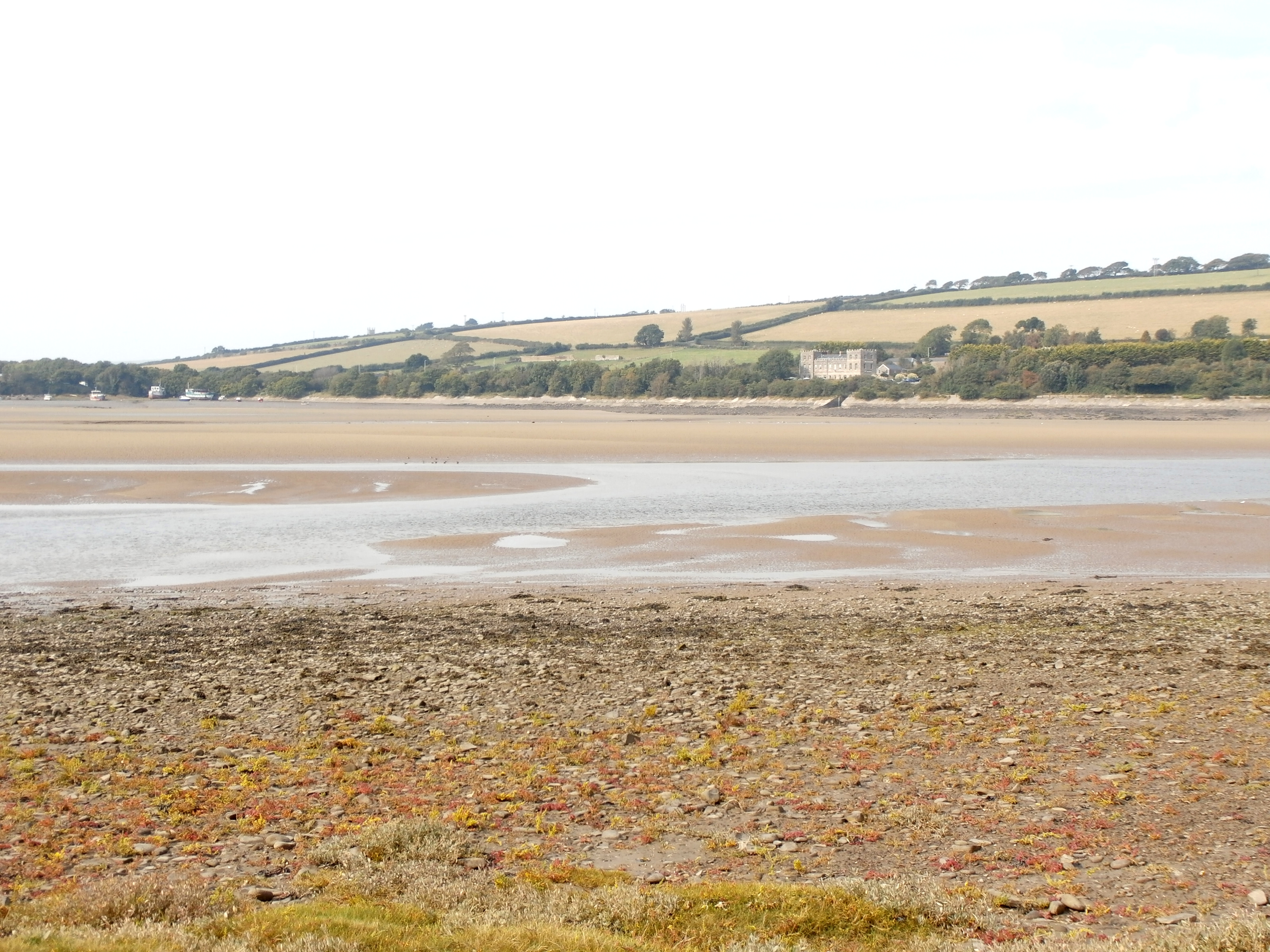
Heanton Court looking north-west across the River Taw estuary: Left, 1796 watercolour by Rev. John Swete; Right, similar view photographed from Penhill Point 2014

Heanton Court, the former manor house of the Manor of Heanton Punchardon, is a grade II listed building situated on the north shore-line of the River Taw estuary, about a mile south-east of the parish church. Rev. John Swete described the house in spring 1796 as "the seat of Col. Basset" and wrote of it that "The house exhibits itself handsomely though its situation (like that of Lord Heathfield's on the Exe [i.e. Nutwell]) seems to be too contiguous to the water. Nearly opposite to it was a large track of marsh and sand..." He later made a copy of a painting by William Payne, c. 1790, (Note: Payne's watercolours of c. 1790 are published in Payne's Devon, and Swete's copy is held by the Devon Record Office, ref 564M/F11/7.) The house as painted by Swete in about 1797 is essentially as it survives today, retaining its battlements and corner towers. It is currently used as a public house and hotel, known in 2015 as the Braunton Inn. In 2019 known as Heanton Court.

== Historic estates ==
=== Wrafton ===
51°09′N 04°15′W
Wrafton is a large hamlet narrowly separated by a small field from edge of the main local village centre, that of Braunton to the west. It is the location of Wrafton Laboratories, the division of over-the-counter preparations and contract medications producer Perrigo UK, manufacturer for Bayer UK of Germolene. Perrigo bought Wrafton Laboratories in 2001. The Tarka Trail follows the course of the dismantled railway through Wrafton.

=== Chivenor ===
51°05′N 04°09′W
Chivenor was an estate within the parish and is immediately to the south of the village, which has a considerable military personnel only housing estate. Until 1970 the Chivenor part of the village had the first station after the still active Barnstaple station on the now-closed Ilfracombe Branch Line.

== Notable residents ==
Among those who rest in the churchyard is the poet Edward Capern (1819–1894), known as the Rural Postman (poet) of Bideford. His headstone is a Grade II listed monument.

== See also ==
- Basset family
