= Shirwell =

Village and civil parish in north Devon, England

Coordinates: 51°07′N 4°00′W

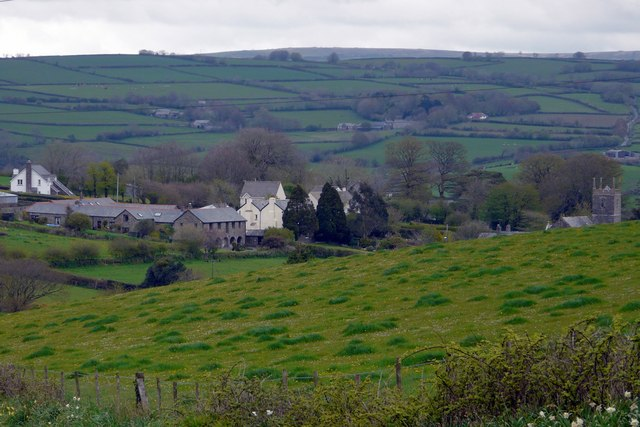
Shirwell village

Shirwell is a village, civil parish and former manor in the local government district of North Devon, in the county of Devon, England. It was also formerly the name of a hundred of Devon. The village lies about 3.5 miles north-east of the town of Barnstaple, to the east of the A39 road to Lynton. The parish is surrounded clockwise from the north by the parishes of East Down, Arlington, Loxhore, Bratton Fleming, Goodleigh, Barnstaple, West Pilton and Marwood. In 2001 its population was 333, little changed from the 1901 figure of 338.

The parish church in the village is the church of St Peter which has 13th-century origins while the chancel is of 14th-century date. It underwent a Victorian restoration by the architect William White between 1873 and 1889. An effigy in the chancel is said to be of Blanche St. Leger (d.1483) and above this is a monument to Lady Anne Chichester (d. 1723). Other 18th-century monuments survive in the church. The aviator and sailor Sir Francis Chichester, who was born in the village Rectory, is buried at the parish church.

== Manor ==
The manor of Shirwell was the seat of two of the leading families of North Devon, the Beaumonts (to the end of the 15th century) and their heirs the Chichesters of Raleigh, Pilton, both of which families lived on the estate of Youlston within the Manor of Shirwell. The manor house which survives today known as Youlston Park exists largely in its Georgian form, but it retains many impressive late 17th-century interiors; it is described in Pevsner as "one of the most rewarding in North Devon".
