= Arthur Bassett (died 1586) =

English politician

Member of Parliament for Devon
- In office 1572

Member of Parliament for Barnstaple
- In office 1563

Personal details
- Born: 1541
- Died: 1586 (aged 44–45)
- Spouse: Eleanor Chichester (d. 1585)
- Children: 7, including Robert
- Parent: John Basset (father)
- Relatives: Basset family Sir John Bassett (grandfather); Arthur Plantagenet (grandfather); Honor Plantagenet (grandmother); Richard Grenville (cousin)

Arms of Basset of Heanton Punchardon and Umberleigh, Devon and Tehidy, Cornwall: Barry wavy of six or and gules

Sir Arthur Bassett (1541–1586) was a member of the prominent west-country Basset family and was MP for Barnstaple in 1563 and Devon in 1572. He served as JP for Devon from 1569 to his death and as Sheriff of Devon in 1574–5. He was knighted in 1575. He had been appointed deputy warden of Stannaries by 1580.

== Origins ==
He was the eldest son of John Basset (died 1541) (son of Sir John Bassett (died 1529)) of Heanton Punchardon and Umberleigh in Devon and Tehidy in Cornwall, Sheriff of Cornwall in 1518 and 1523, by his wife Frances Plantagenet, the daughter and co-heiress of his step-father Arthur Plantagenet, 1st Viscount Lisle, bastard son of King Edward IV. Arthur Bassett was thus a grandson of Arthur Plantagenet on his mother's side, and on his father's side a grandson of Honor Plantagenet, Viscountess Lisle, née Honor Grenville, the second wife of Sir John Bassett (died 1529) who married secondly as his second wife the aforementioned Arthur Plantagenet. Making Bassett the cousin of Sir Richard Grenville the Younger, via Grenville's Aunt, Honor Grenville.

== Career ==
Bassett was by religion a puritan, and a friend of the powerful Francis Russell, 2nd Earl of Bedford (1527–1585), of whose will he was an overseer. He helped to finance the expedition to the South Seas undertaken by his cousin, Sir Richard Grenville. His father-in-law Sir John Chichester (died 1569) conveyed to him for a term of five years the rectory of Pilton Priory, which he had himself acquired following the dissolution of the monasteries. He volunteered for military service in the Netherlands to defend the Protestant cause against the Spanish, where in 1586 he obtained a command at The Hague, serving under Robert Dudley, 1st Earl of Leicester, the maternal uncle of his friend Sir Philip Sidney who was killed in 1586 at the Battle of Zutphen.

== Marriage and children ==
He married Eleanor Chichester (died 1585), a daughter of Sir John Chichester (died 1569), MP, lord of the manor of Raleigh in the parish of Pilton, Devon. By her he had five sons and two daughters including:

- Sir Robert Basset (1573–1641), his eldest son and heir, MP for Plymouth in 1593, who married Elizabeth Periam (1571–1635) (whose mural monument exists in Heanton Punchardon Church) the second daughter and co-heiress of Sir William Peryam, Lord Chief Baron of the Exchequer. Due to his Plantagenet ancestry he made what turned out to be a foolish and costly decision to offer himself as one of the many claimants to the throne of England after the death of Queen Elizabeth, perhaps encouraged by his father-in-law Peryam. He suffered a heavy fine for his action which, according to the biographer John Prince, involved the sale of thirty of the family's manors.
- Margaret Bassett, who married Richard Duke (1567–1641) of Otterton, Devon (whose monumental brass plaque survives in Otterton Church).

== Death and burial ==
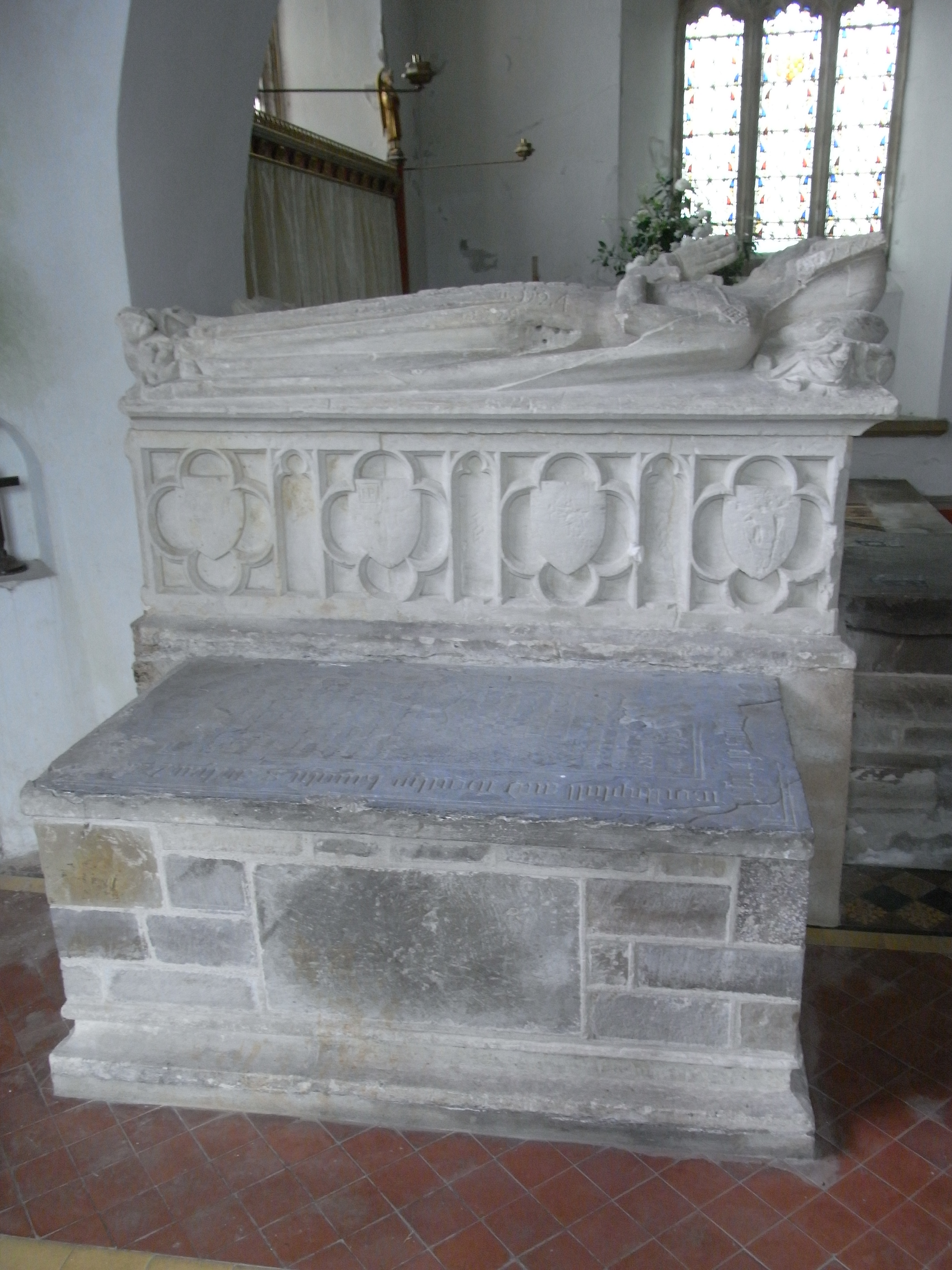
Small chest tomb (foreground) in Atherington Church, Devon, of Sir Arthur Basset (1541–1586) of Umberleigh and his wife Eleanor Chichester

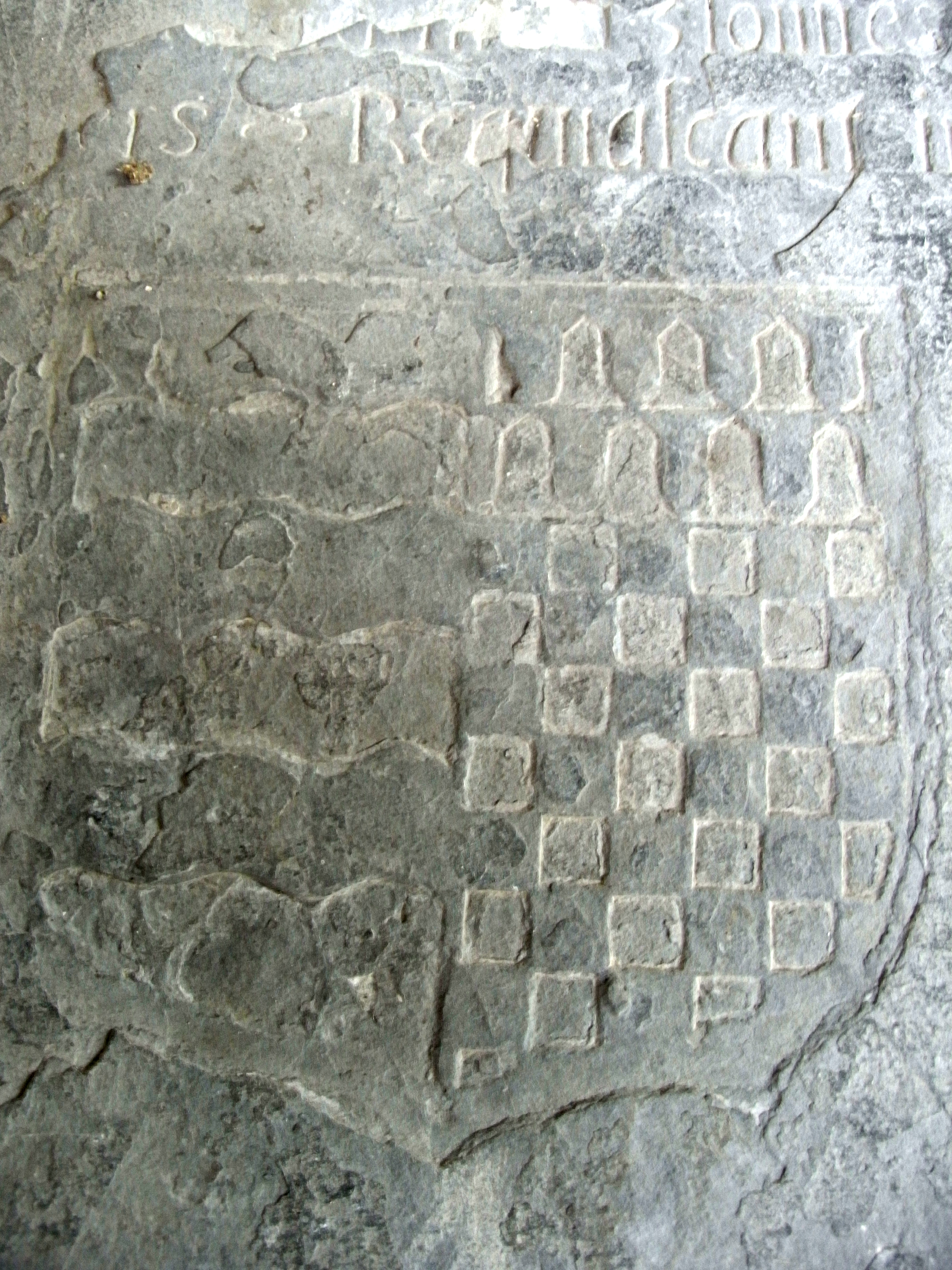
Slate slab on top of chest tomb in Atherington Church, Devon, of Sir Arthur Basset (1541–1586) shows arms of Basset impaling Chichester

Bassett died of Gaol Fever in 1586 whilst serving in his judicial role at the notorious Lent Black Assize of Exeter from 14 March 1586. Eight other judges or Justices of the Peace also died of the same fever. In his will dated 18 October 1585 he asked to be buried "honestly and decently" beside his wife. He died before 7 April 1586. His curiously small chest tomb with inscribed slate top slab exists in Atherington Church, which was historically within the manor of Umberleigh. It is likely that his burial took place in the Umberleigh Chapel, now a ruin, which stood next to the manor house of Umberleigh. All the tombs and monuments were removed from there to Atherington Church in about 1820, and thus Sir Arthur's slab probably sits on a modern base. The surface of the slate has largely flaked off, but the central escutcheon showing the arms of Bassett impaling Chichester is still visible, with part of the inscription in a ledger line around the perimeter, and some verse beneath the shield:

"Here lie ye bodies of ye Right Worshipful and Worthy Knight, Sir Arthur Bassett and Elianora his wife, daughter of Sir John Chichester of Rawleigh... the 2nd April 1586. The latter buried the 10th July 1585... behind them 5 sonnes and 2 daughters. Requiescant in pace" ("May they rest in peace")" Below is the impaled shield, below which is the following verse:

"He that is three in one and one in three,
First made us two, then one, this one were wee,
One love, one life we lived, one year, one death
Rocked us asleepe by borrowing but our breath.
Grave the bed that holds us both, the stone
(That) hides us covert, the bed is one,
One Heaven contains our souls, one trumpte one day,
(Will) raise our bodies from this bed of clay.
Death which useth others to dissever,
(Hath) once united us forever"

== Sources ==
- Hasler, P.W., Biography of Arthur Bassett published in History of Parliament, House of Commons 1558-1603, London, 1981
