= Holy Trinity Chapel, Umberleigh =

Ruined chapel in Atherington, Devon, UK

Coordinates: 51.0037°N 4.0060°W

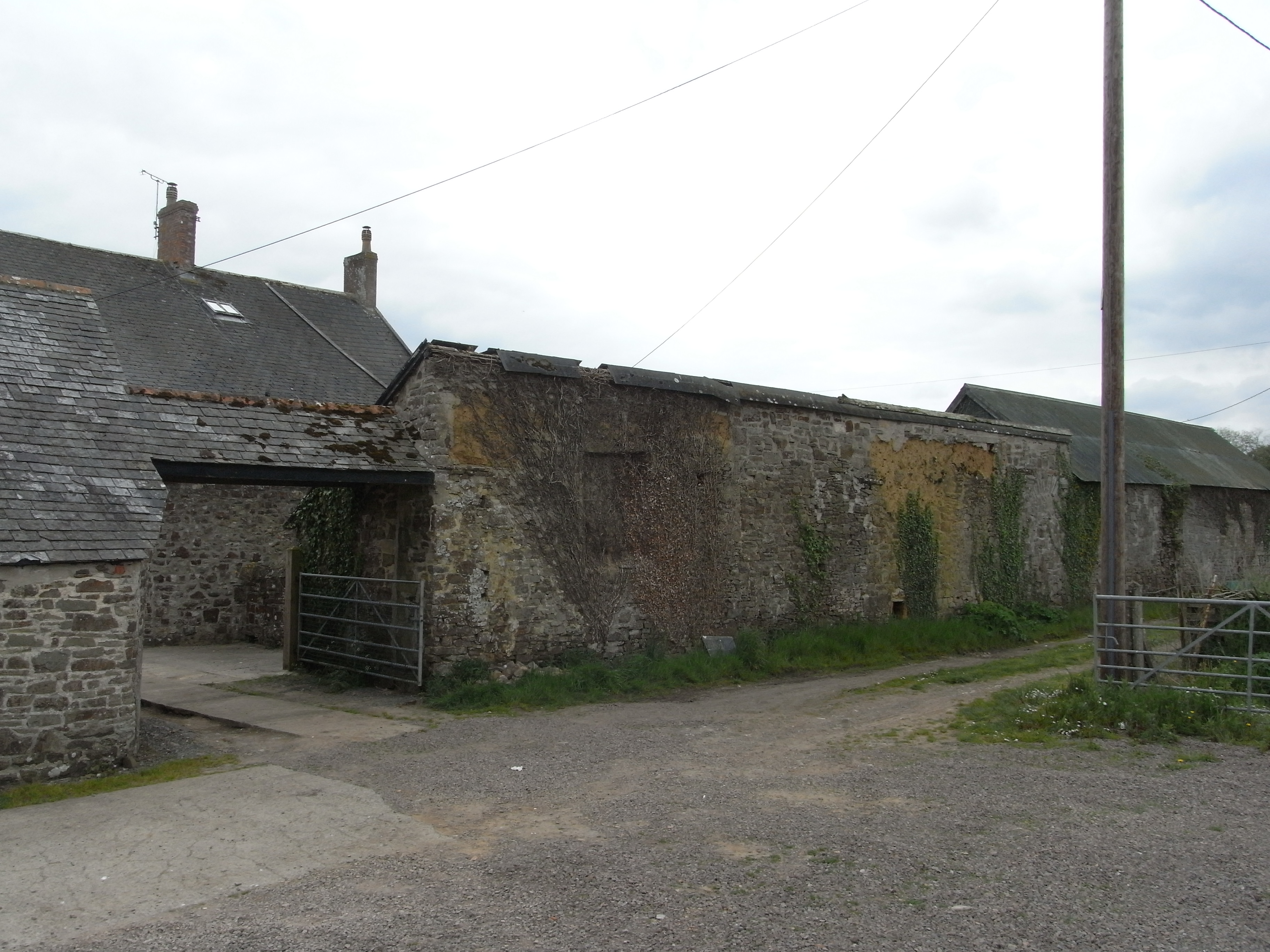
Surviving south wall (centre) of Umberleigh Chapel in Atherington, Devon, founded by Joan Champernown c. 1275. Now a redundant farm building next to Umberleigh House. The north side of the wall is covered by a modern lean-to roof which forms a long storage shed. In the north side of the wall are visible the blocked up gothic-arched doorway and four lancet windows

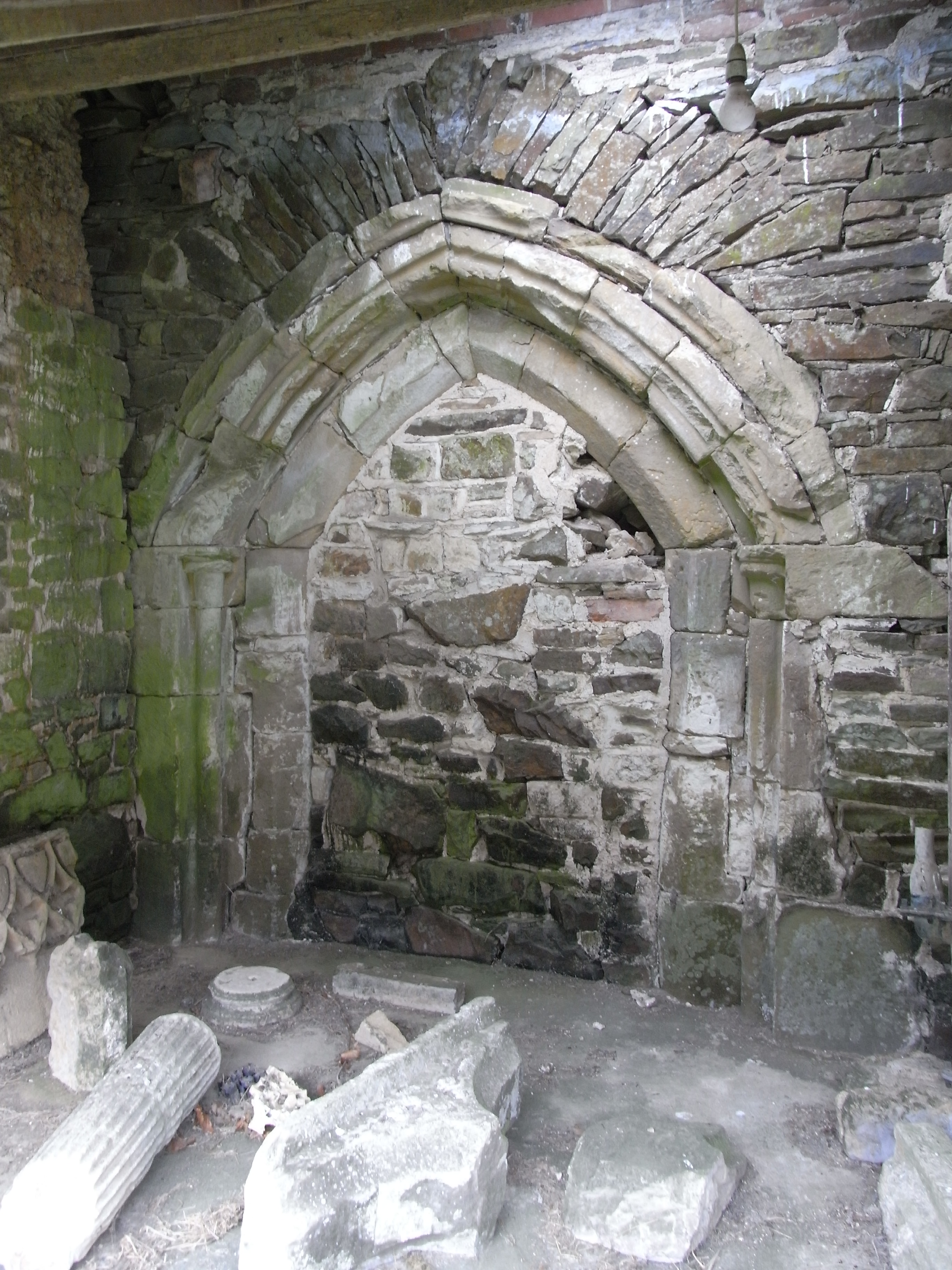
Gothic doorway to ruined Umberleigh Chapel, north side of sole surviving wall. The architectural fragments belonging to the chapel or former mansion house were unearthed in the vicinity from the 1950s onwards

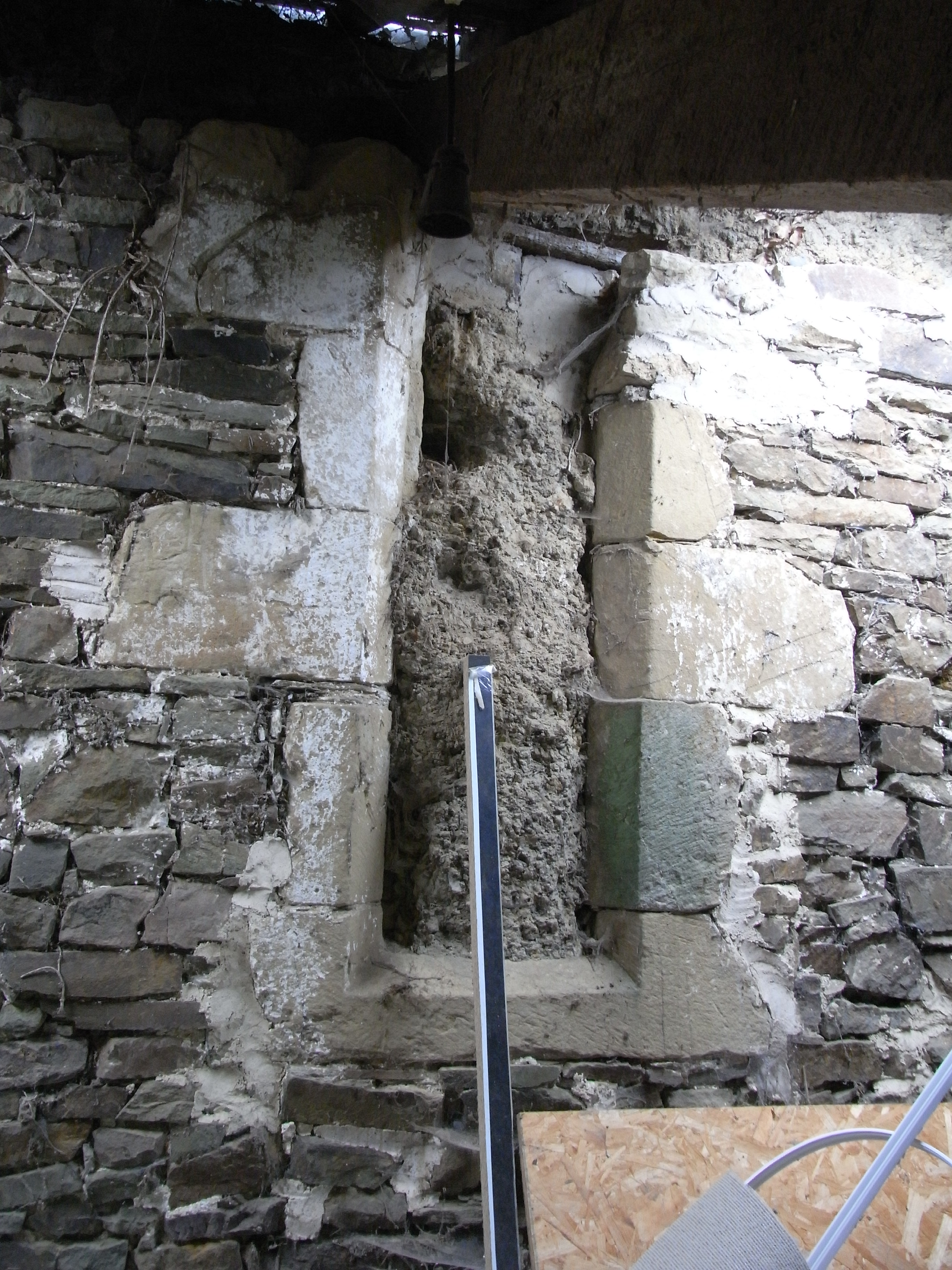
Mediaeval lancet window on internal wall of ruined Umberleigh Chapel

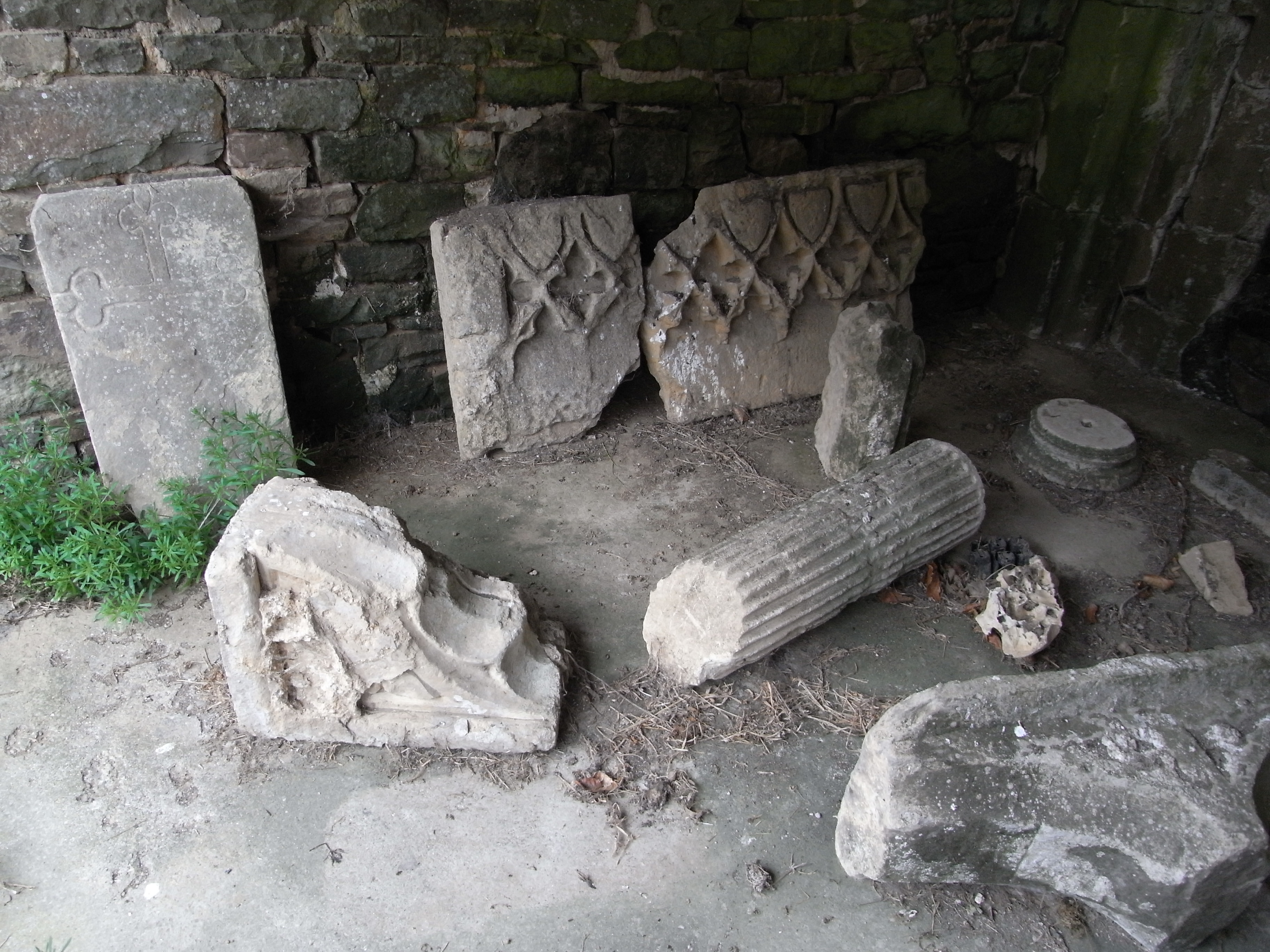
Unearthed fragments of architectural decoration belonging to the mediaeval Umberleigh Chapel or adjacent mansion. The length of stone sculpted with gothic niches enclosing shields (rear right) may have been the original base of the chest tomb on top of which lay the effigies of the knight and his lady removed to Atherington Church in about 1800. The grave slab incised with a large floriated cross (left) is of very ancient date and compares with a similar slab in nearby Chittlehampton Church. The renaissance classical column (centre) perhaps was originally part of the canopy of a 16th- or 17th-century monument

The Chapel of the Holy Trinity at Umberleigh is a ruinous mediaeval chapel in north Devon, England, largely demolished according to Lysons (1822) in about 1800. It stands next to Umberleigh House, the manor house of Umberleigh, which still survives in the form of a large Georgian farmhouse. The ruins together with the adjoining Umberleigh House were granted a Grade I listed status on 25 February 1965. According to Tristram Risdon (d.1640) the Devon historian, the site was originally a royal palace of the Saxon King Æthelstan and was later a mediaeval mansion house by successive inheritance of the Solery (or de Soligny), Champernoun, Willington, Beaumont and Bassett families. The chapel, manor house and estate of 400 acres with 7 cottages is today the property of the Andrews family, which purchased the freehold of the property in 1917 but had been long-standing tenants of the Bassett family from about 1840. The south wall of the chapel survives and today forms the back wall of an outbuilding used for general storage.

== Foundation ==
Umberleigh Chapel of the Holy Trinity was founded by the widow Lady Joan Willington (died c. 1314), née Champernowne (Latinised to Campo Arnulphi ("from the field of Arnulph"), formerly the wife of Sir Ralph Willington of Gloucestershire, and the daughter and heiress of Sir William Champernowne of Umberleigh. The foundation deed was quoted by Tristram Risdon in his 1630 work A Survey of Devon:

"Johan de Campo Arnulphi salut(em). Noveritis me in viduitate mea divinae charitatIs). intuit(a). pro salutat(e) animae meae et antecessorum meorum nec non pro salutate animarum domini Will. de Campo Arnulphi patris mei et Eve matris mei et puerorum nostrorum conces(sisse) totam terram de Wiara ad sustentationem capella ad present(atio)nem nostram et haeredum ad celebrand(um) divina in capella nost(ra) de Umberley. Hiis testibus: John de Punchardon, Nicholao de Filleigh, Roberto Beaple, Matth. de Wollington, milit(e)"

Which may be translated into English thus:

"Joan de Champernowne, greetings. Know ye that I in my widowhood, inspired of divine charity, for the salvation of my soul and of my ancestors, not least for the salvation of the souls of lord William de Champernowne, my father, and of Eve my mother and of Sir Ralph de Willington sometime my husband, and of our boys, have granted all the land of Wiara toward the sustenance of a chaplain of our own presentation, and of that of our heirs, to divine celebration in our chapel of Umberleigh. With these witnesses: John de Punchardon, Nicholas de Filleigh, Robert Beaple (of Landkey), Matthew de W(i)llington, knight".

== Monuments ==
Most of the monuments which had been erected in the Umberleigh Chapel over the centuries were removed in about 1820 to nearby Atherington Church. The return made by a resident of Umberleigh to Dean Milles' Questionnaire of about 1753 records the then appearance of the Umberleigh Chapel. Three tombs existed, identified by Coulter by the letters A, B and C:

- A: "Near the entrance of the chapel on the south side (is) the statue of a cross-legged knight raised a little above the ground". (lost)
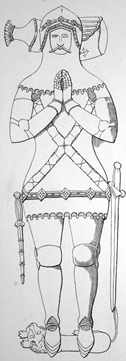
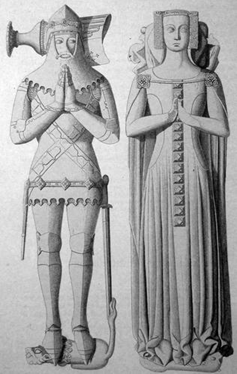
Left: 1877 Drawing by W. H. Hamilton Rogers of male effigy of pair "B", supposedly of Sir Ralph Willington (1385) formerly in the Umberleigh Chapel, removed thence c. 1800 to Atherington Church, Devon; right: Drawing of effigies "B" by Charles Stothard, 1876

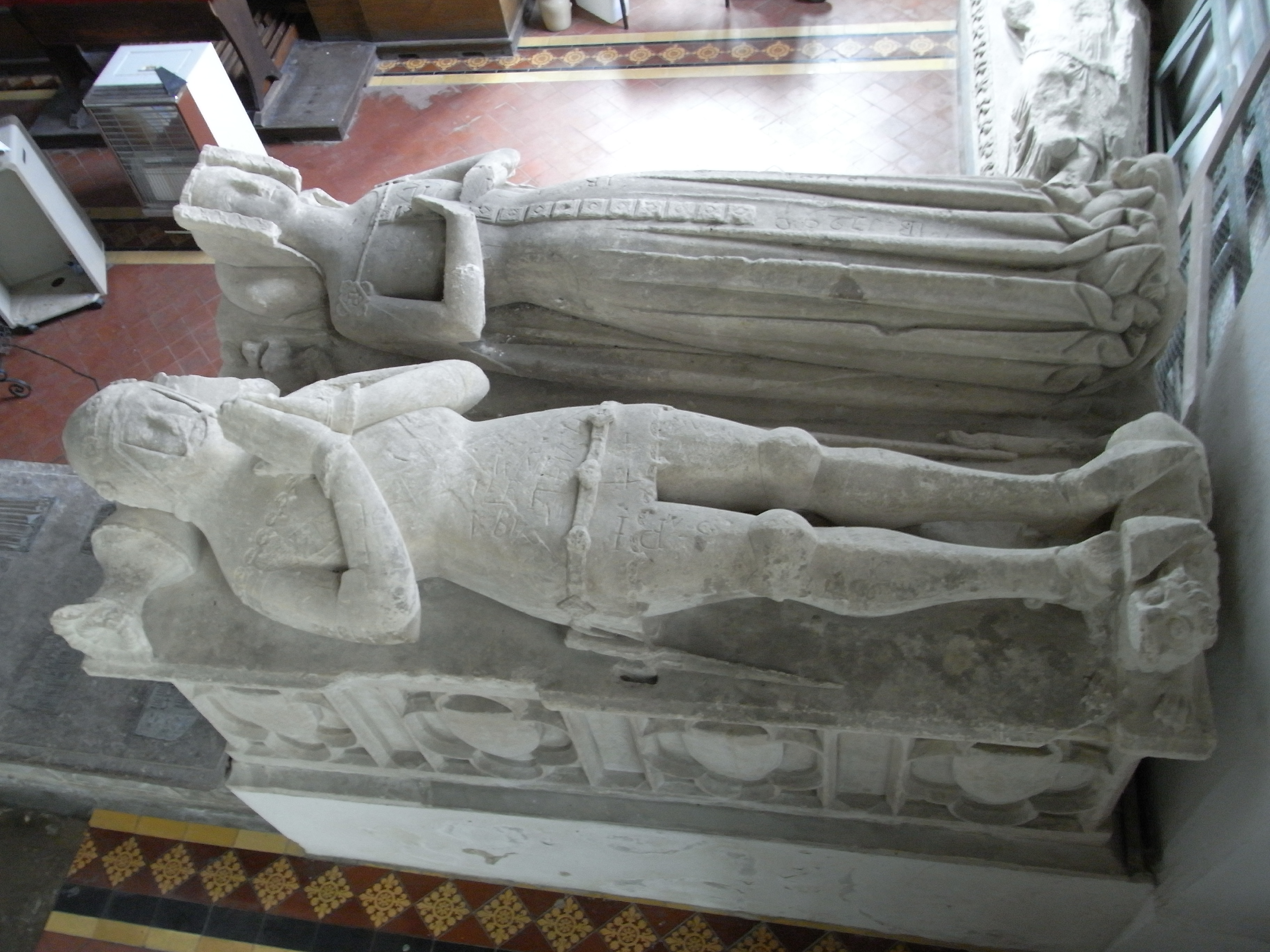
Willington effigies in their present location in Atherington Church, north side of chancel, on 19th-century plinth

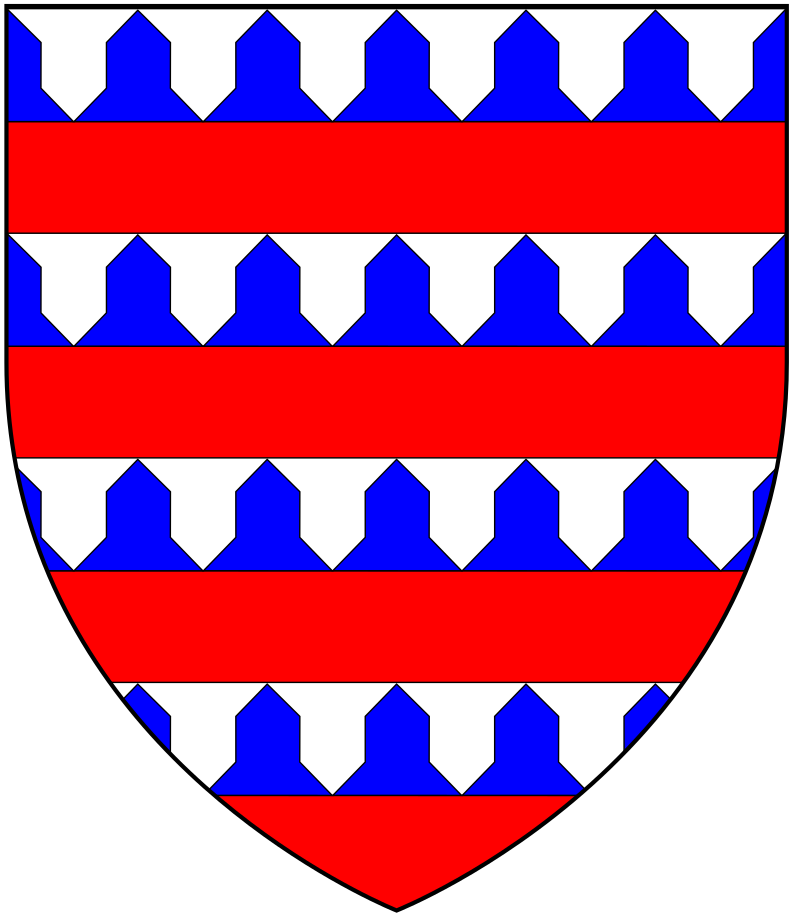
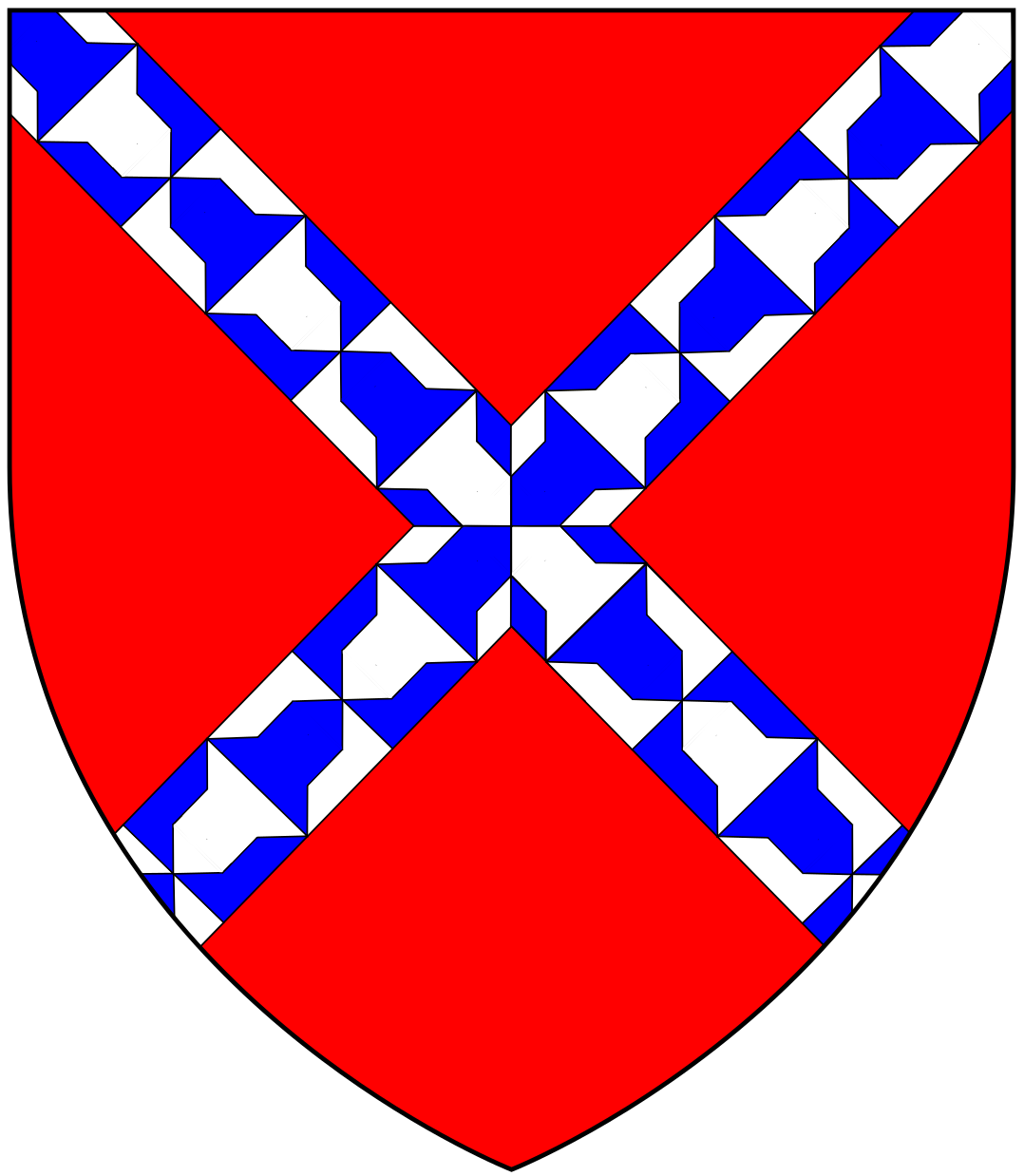
Arms shown in the heraldic escutcheons on the chest tomb of Sir John Bassett (1462–1529) in Atherington Church: Left (in 2nd quarter): Arms of Beaumont of Umberleigh: Barry of six vair and gules. Right (in 3rd quarter): Arms of Willington of Umberleigh and Barcheston in Warwickshire: Gules, a saltire vair
- B:"Towards the north-east corner on a raised tomb the figure of a man in armour with a shield on his right arm a dagger on the left thigh a crest on his head. The figure of his wife lies on the inside. The front of the tomb is adorned with niches on each (of which) is a shield which had arms painted on it". These two effigies are now in Atherington Church, sided by side on a replacement base, on the north side of the chancel. They were stated by Stothard (1876) to represent "Sir Ralph Willington (d.1385) and his wife". Cresswell (1938) however suggested them to represent Sir Henry de Willington (d. pre-1437) and his wife Lady Isabella, whom she described as "the last willingtons of importance who held the manor of Umberleigh". Certainly the knight bears the Willington armorials on the chest of his surcoat: (gules) a saltire vair, as can be seen from the Stothard drawing, but which is now barely visible on the monument itself. His head rests on a helm above which is his crest, resembling an inverted goblet (not apparently a pine tree proper as often quoted for this family).

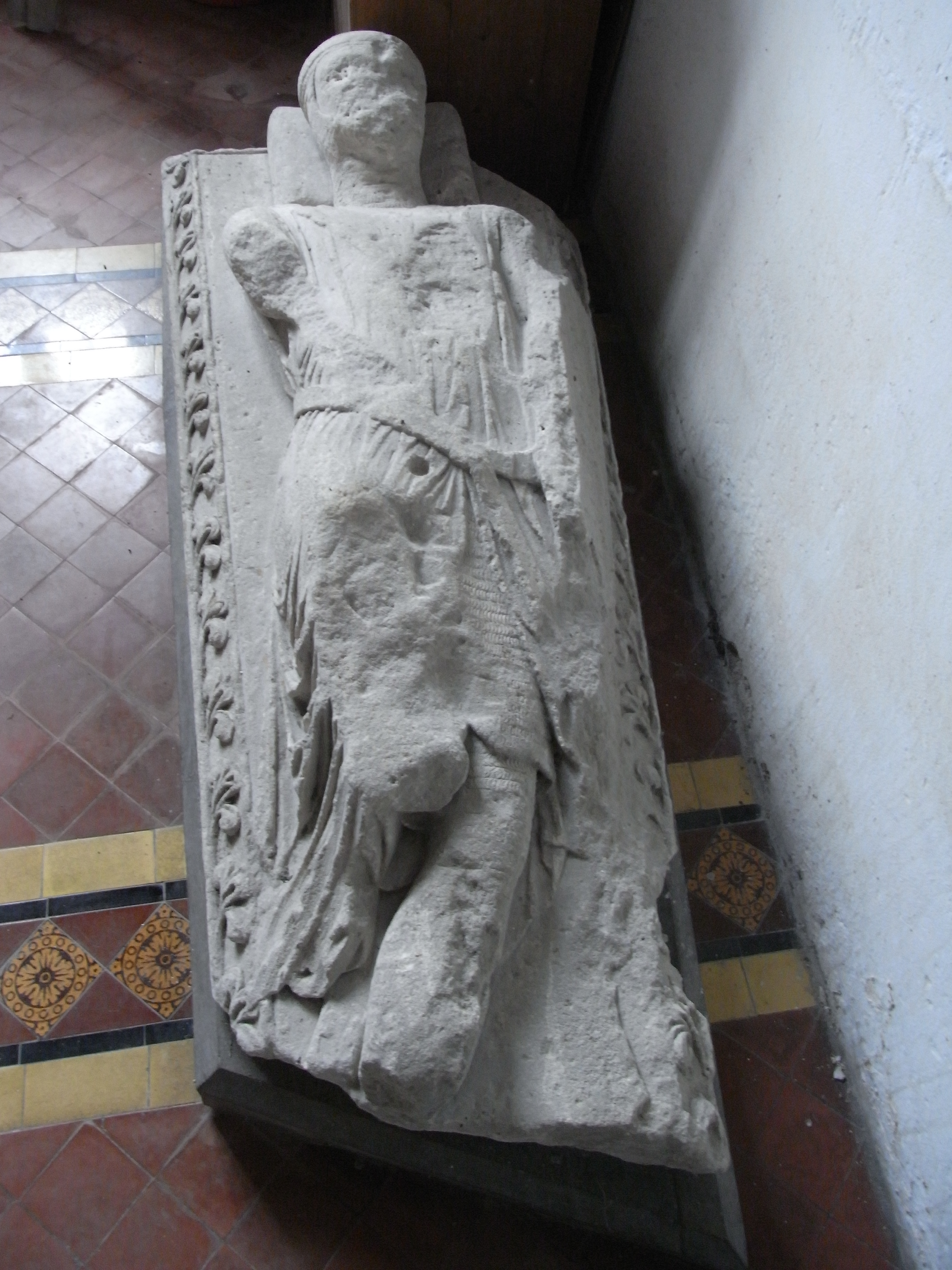
13th-century effigy "C", supposed to be the crusading knight Sir William de Champernowne, against east wall of north aisle, Atherington Church. It is comparable to the 13th-century effigies in the Temple Church in London

- C: "Under the south wall is the figure of a knight cross-legged with a loose vest over a suit of chain armour. His left arm bears a long pointed shield which he supports also with his right hand. I take this to be a monument of a Knight Templar as it appears to me the more ancient because the stone is broader at the head than at the feet". This effigy, in the sculptural style of the 13th century, with its legs broken off below the knees and missing the right arm, is now in Atherington Church, on the floor. It is suggested by Coulter (1993) to represent Sir William de Champernowne, father of Lady Joan Willington. Such figures with crossed legs are generally believed to represent crusaders.

Risdon, writing in about 1630 described the Chapel and its contents thus:

"In Trinity Chapel, which still stands, many of these (i.e. lords of the manor of Umberleigh) were interred, this being their principal dwelling, where they had fair sepulchres on whose tombs some of their proportions were curiously cut; but 'tempus edax rerum', now only two of them remain, upon one of which is the 'effigies' of a knight and his lady adorned with their armories, and other noble families, their allies, richly gilded, whereon the Courtenays, Grandisons, Willingtons, Whalshborowes, did not long since appear. On the other was a proportion, completely armed, lying cross-legged after the manner of such as in elder ages went to war in the Holy Land. But none of them have any inscription left to testify who they were".

== Sources ==
- Coulter, James, The Ancient Chapels of North Devon, Barnstaple, 1993, Umberleigh Chapel pp. 10–13
- Cresswell, Beatrix F., Umberleigh Chapel, lecture read at Barnstaple 23 June 1938.
