= Umberleigh =

Coordinates: 50.9953°N 3.9838°W

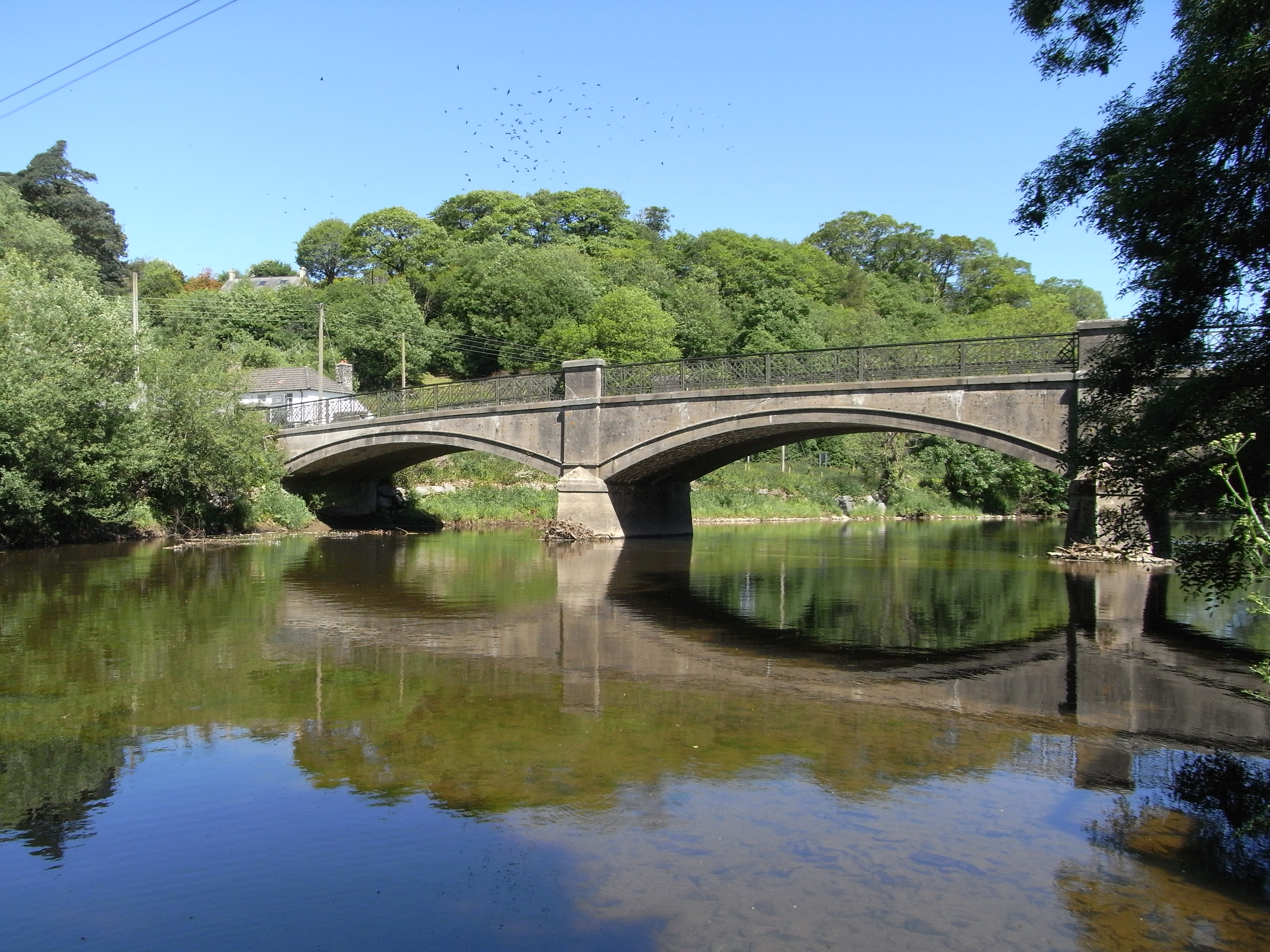
- Umberleigh Bridge over River Taw, looking downstream

- Location within Devon
- OS grid reference: SS6023
- Civil parish: Chittlehampton
- District: North Devon
- Shire county: Devon
- Region: South West
- Country: England
- Sovereign state: United Kingdom
- Post town: UMBERLEIGH
- Postcode district: EX37
- Dialling code: 01769
- Police: Devon and Cornwall
- Fire: Devon and Somerset
- Ambulance: South Western
- UK Parliament: North Devon

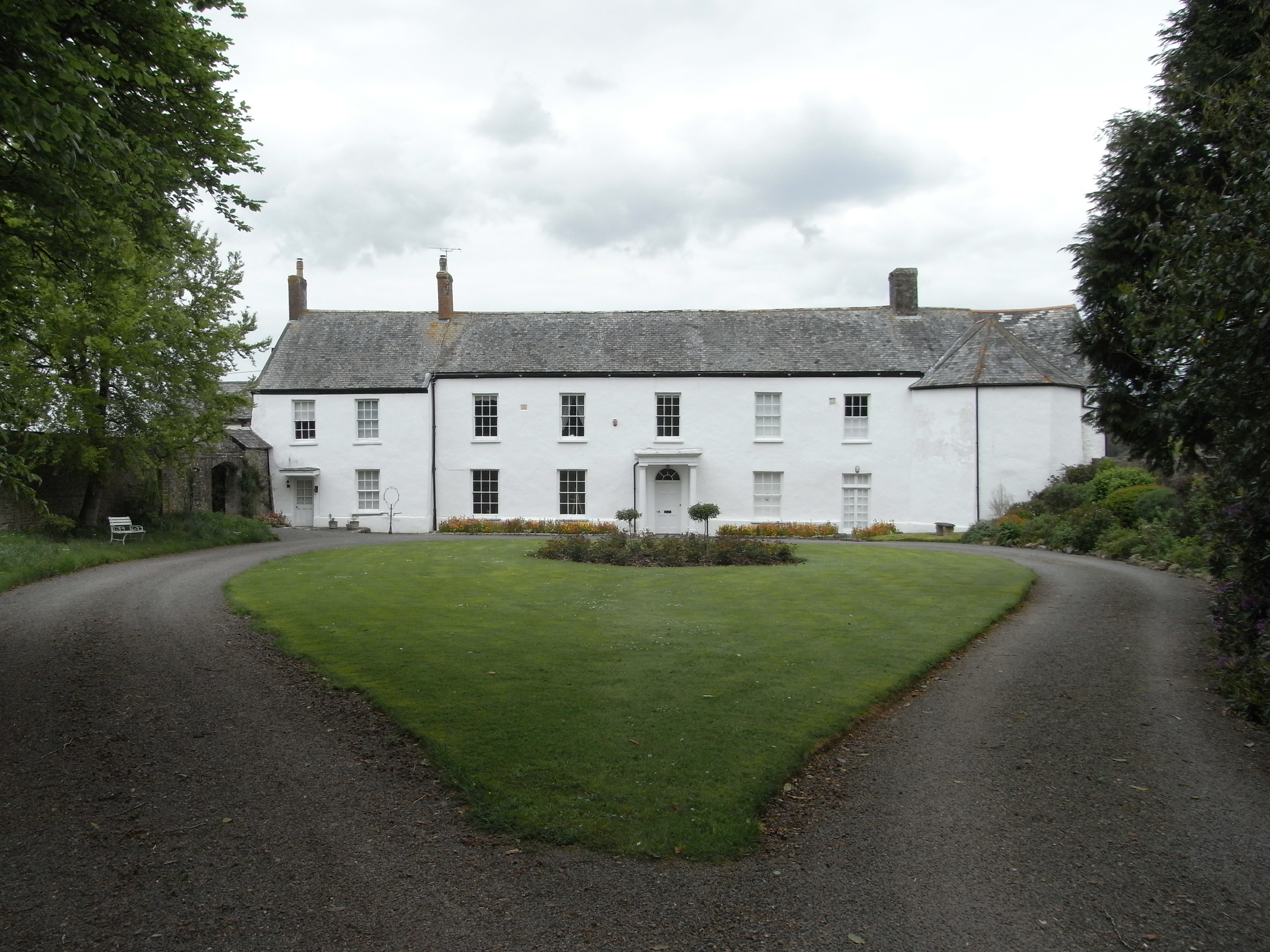
The Georgian Umberleigh House, a Grade I listed building, a remnant of the grand 16th-century mansion of the Basset family, on the west bank of the River Taw, 1 mile northwest of Umberleigh Bridge, now in the parish of Atherington. It was anciently the manor house of Umberleigh, site of the mediaeval Umberleigh Chapel, the ruins of which survive, and supposedly of the 10th-century royal palace of King Æthelstan.

Umberleigh is a former large manor within the historic hundred of (North) Tawton, but today a small village in North Devon in England. It used to be an ecclesiastical parish, but following the building of the church at Atherington it became a part of that parish. It forms however a part of the civil parish of Chittlehampton, which is mostly located on the east side of the River Taw.

The manor of Umberleigh, which had its own entry in the Domesday Book of 1086, was entirely situated on the west side of the River Taw and was centred on the Nunnery which was given by William the Conqueror to the Holy Trinity Abbey in Caen, Normandy.

The site was later occupied by the manor house of Umberleigh, the present Georgian manifestation of which, a large and grand farmhouse, is known as "Umberleigh House". Next to the manor house in about 1275 was founded Umberleigh Chapel, now a ruin the single remaining wall of which forms the back wall of a farm implements shed.

== Descent of the manor ==
=== King Athelstan ===
According to the Devon historian Tristram Risdon (d.1640), Umberleigh was a royal manor held in demesne by King Athelstan (circa 893/895-939), King of the West Saxons from 924 to 927, and King of the English from 927 to 939. He built at Umberleigh a palace and next to it a chapel dedicated to the Blessed Trinity which served the royal family and household. Within the manor of Umberleigh Athelstan later founded two churches, at Bickington, now High Bickington and at Atherington, each of which he endowed with two hides of land.

=== Norman Conquest ===
Immediately prior to the Norman Conquest of England in 1066 the manor of Umberleigh had been held by Brictric, as recorded in the Domesday Book of 1086. He was probably the great Saxon thane Brictric son of Algar. A person named Brictric was also the pre-Conquest holder of the single possession in Dorset of the Church of the Holy Trinity of Caen, the post-Conquest holder of Umberleigh.

In the Domesday Book of 1086 Umberlei is listed as the sole possession of the Eccl(esi)a (de) S(ancta) Trinitat(e) Cadom(ensis), the Church of the Holy Trinity of Caen, Normandy, the 12th-century Norman church of which survives today as the Abbaye de Sainte-Trinité, also known as the Abbaye aux Dames ("Abbey of Ladies"), due to the fact it was founded by William the Conqueror (1066–1087) and his wife Matilda of Flanders, before the Norman Conquest of England, as a Benedictine monastery for women. The building work began in 1062 and finished in 1130.

Umberleigh subsequently became a holding of the feudal barony of Gloucester, granted by King William II (1087–1100) to Robert FitzHamon (died 1107), whose daughter and sole heiress Maud married Robert de Caen, natural (ie. illegitimate) son of King Henry I (1100–1135).

=== Soleigney family ===
Arms of de Soleigny: Quarterly argent and gules.

The first subsequent holder of the manor of Umberleigh identified by Risdon and Pole was Asculph de Soleigny (or de Solarys; Latinised as Halculfus de Soleinnio), also lord of the manor of adjacent Atherington, d. 1171), who lived at Umberleigh during the reign of King Henry II (1154–1189). He was succeeded by his son, either Gilbert (according to Risdon), or Phillip de Soleigny (according to Pole). Both father and son fought under King Henry II during his battles to succeed King Stephen (1135–1154).

Gilbert/Phillip de Soleigny married Avis (or Hawis) de Redvers, daughter of "Baldwin de Redvers, Earl of Devon", and according to Risdon the sister of "Richard Rivers, Earl of Devon", probably Richard de Redvers, 4th Earl of Devon (d.1193). For her dowry Hawis was given by her father the manor of Stoke Rivers, which thus passed to her husband. Gilbert/Phillip de Soligny left a daughter Mabill de Soligny as sole heiress, who married Jordan de Champernon, into whose family Umberleigh passed.

=== Champernon/Champernowne family ===
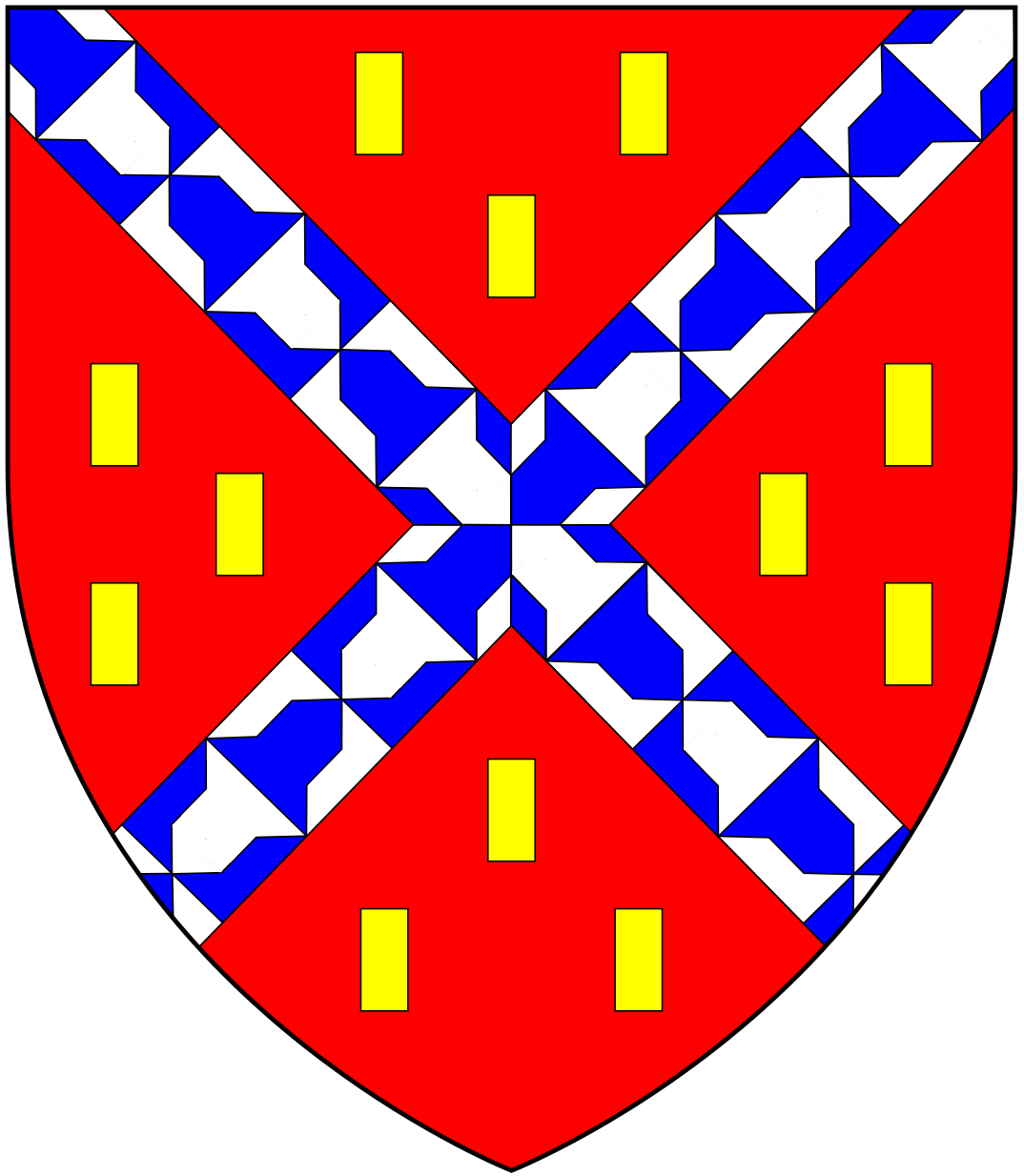
Arms of the Champernon/Champernowne family: Gules, a saltire vair between twelve billets or.

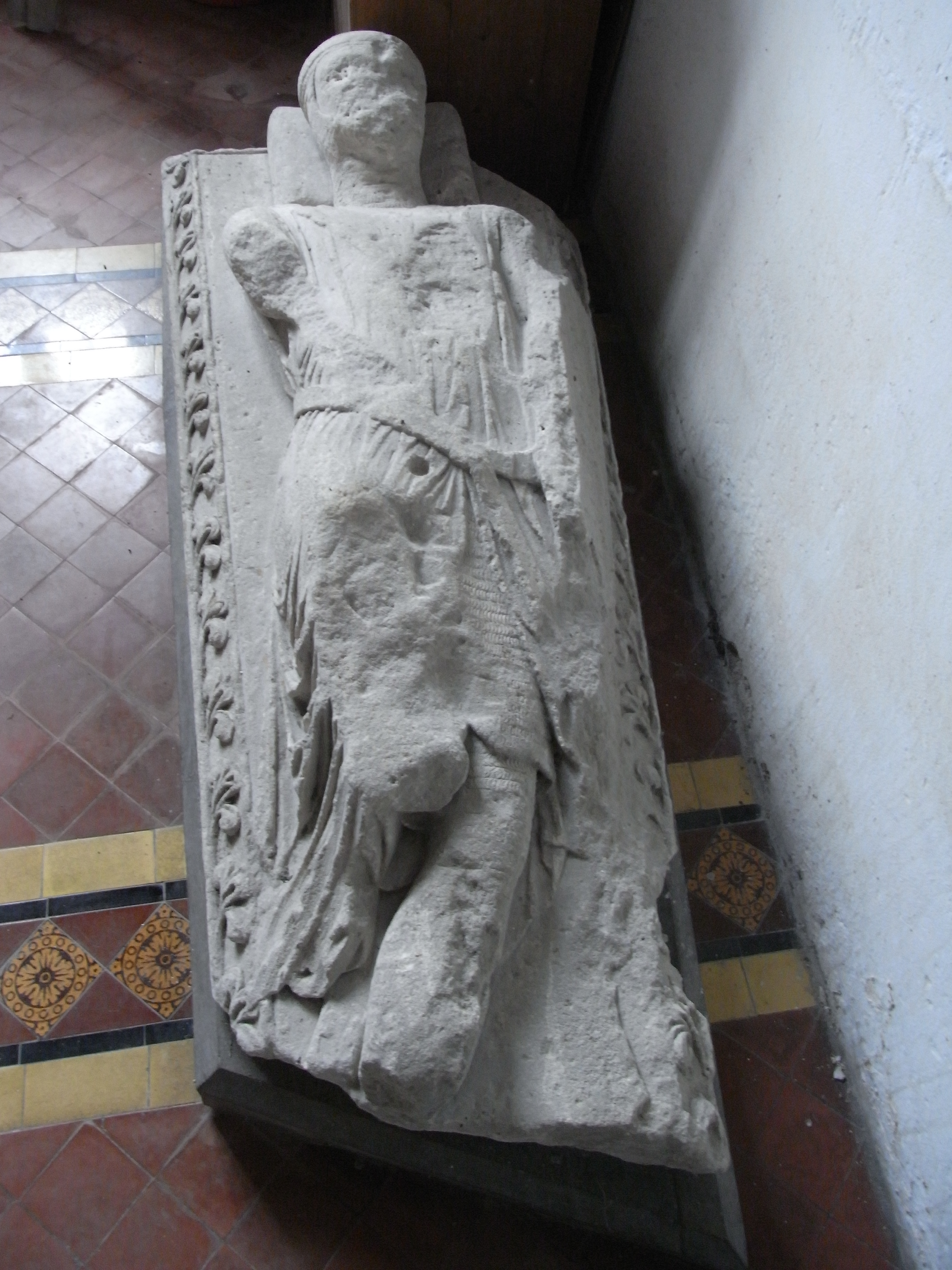
A 13th-century effigy, originally cross-legged, believed to be the crusading knight Sir William de Champernon, now situated against east wall of north aisle, Atherington Church, removed circa 1820 from the Umberleigh Chapel. It is comparable to the 13th-century effigies in the Temple Church in London.

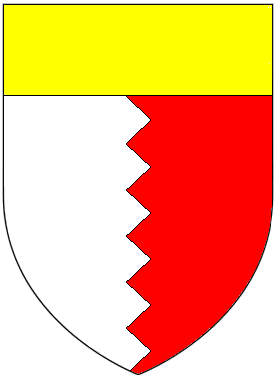
The (ancient) arms of the Willington family: Party per pale indented argent and gules a chief or. All the sons of Joan de Champernon and Ralph de Willington abandoned their paternal arms of Willington (ancient) in favour of a differenced version of their maternal arms of Champernon (see below). These ancient arms are shown in 19th-century stained glass in Atherington Church impaling the Champernowne arms.

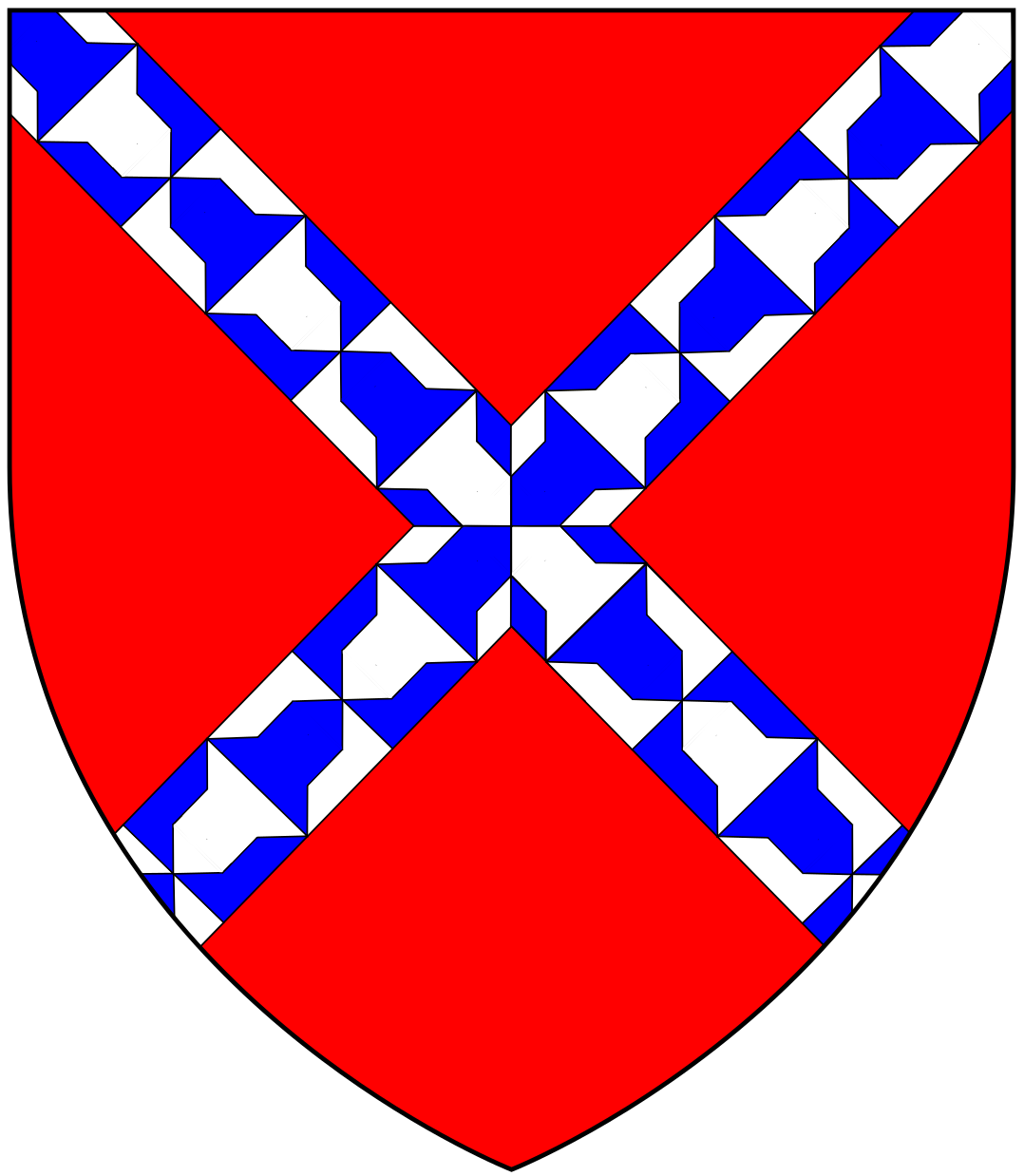
Modern arms of the Willingtons of Umberleigh, Devon and Barcheston in Warwickshire: Gules, a saltire vair. These arms of Willington a saltire vair are shown on the tomb in Barcheston Church, Warks., of William Willington (d.1555), of Willington manor and his wife Anne, whose alabaster effigies lie on top of the tomb. Also the same arms are listed in the Heralds' Visitation of Warwickshire, 1619 (Wellington de Hurley): Gules, a saltire vair. The Dering Roll of Arms lists the arms of Rauf de Wiltone as Gules, a saltire vair.

The Champernon family, sometimes Latinised Campo Arnulfi ("field of Arnulph") originated in the Cambernon area of Lower Normandy, and their arrival in England was associated with the Norman Conquest. Many members of the family later adopted alternate spellings such as Champernoun, Champernowne, and Chapman.

The immediate line of descent from Jordan and Mabill de Champernon is unclear. According to Risdon, their sole heir was a daughter, Joan de Champernon (implying perhaps that her issue son adopted the name Champernon). However, Pole's account assigns two sons to Jordan and Mabill: Richard de Champernon, who died without issue, and Jordan de Champernon (II).

At Umberleigh, William de Champernon, apparently a grandson of Jordan II, was by his wife Eva, the father of another Joan de Champernon (II), also a sole heiress. Joan II who lived during the reign of King Edward I (1272–1307) married Sir Ralph de Willington (II; see the following section) of Gloucestershire, but retained her maiden name, which she used in legal documents. For instance, an (undated) grant during her widowhood, confirmed by "Peter, Bishop of Exeter" (apparently Peter Quinel (reigned 1280–1291), gave land to Umberleigh Chapel. It was recorded by Risdon as follows:

Johan de Campo Arnulphi salut(ate) noveritis me in viduitate mea divinae charitat(e) intuit(a) pro salut(ate) animae meae et antecessorum meorum nec non pro salut(ate) animarum Domini Will(ielmi) de Campo Arnulphi patris mei et Eve matris mei et Domin(i) Ralph de Willington, quondam viri mei et puerorum nostrorum conces(ssi) totam terram de Wiara ad sustentationem capella ad present(atio)nem nostram et haeredum ad celebrand(um) divina in capella nostra de Umberley. Hiis testibus: Joh(an)n(is) de Punchardon, Nicholao de Filleigh, Roberto Beaple, Matth. de Wollington, milit(ibus) [Which may be translated thus:]

"Joan de Champernon, greetings. Know ye all that I in my widowhood, inspired by divine charity for the good of my soul and of the souls of my ancestors and not least for the good of the souls of Lord William de Champernon my father and Eve my mother and of Lord Ralph de Willington, sometime my husband and of our boys, I have granted all that land of Wiara [possibly Wear] towards the support of a chaplain, the presentation of whom to belong to us and our heirs, for the celebration of divine service in our Chapel of Umberleigh. With these witnesses (present): John de Punchardon (originally de Pont Chardon, lord of the manor of Heanton Punchardon; Nicholas de Filleigh, (lord of the manor of Filleigh); Robert Beauple (probably lord of the manors of Landkey and Knowstone); Matthew de Wollington, knights"

Other branches of the Champernon family were associated with three other prominent estates in Devon:

- Ilfracombe was inherited during the reign of King Richard I (1189–1199) by Henry de Champernon of "Clist Champernon" from his wife Rohais. The Ilfracombe line was itself descended from Richard de Champernon of "Clist Champernon", a brother of Jordan de Champernon II (see above).
- Modbury was inherited from the Okeston family during the reign of King Edward II (1307–1327). It was retained by the family until 1700 when it was sold by Arthur Champernowne of Modbury (born 1671/2), who died without issue some time before 1717.
- Dartington Hall was acquired by Vice-Admiral Sir Arthur Champernowne (before 1524–1578) in 1559. Sir Arthur Champernowne was descended from Richard de Champernon, brother of Jordan II, by way of a younger son of the Champernon branch at Modbury. Jane Champernowne, the sole-heiress of Arthur Champernowne (died 1766), married Arthur Harrington (died 1819), who in accordance with the terms of inheritance, changed his family name by royal licence to Champernowne. Arthur Melville Champernowne (born 1871), the great-grandson of Jane and Arthur Harrington Champernowne, held Dartington Hall until 1925, when it was sold out of the family.

=== Willington family ===
The family of Ralph de Willington II (see above) originated at the manor of Willington near Repton in Derbyshireand later resided at Yate, Gloucestershire.

An ancestor, also Ralph de Willington (I; died pre-1242) married Olympia (died post 1242), heiress of Sandhurst, in Gloucestershire, granddaughter of a certain Wymark, widow John Frenchevaler. In about 1200 Wymark had granted to St Peter's Abbey, Gloucester, (now Gloucester Cathedral) 6 acres of land in Longford, within the manor of Sandhurst, for the purpose of mending the "ironwork of horses" belonging to visiting monks. The grant was later confirmed by Ralph Willington, husband of Olympia. Between 1224 and 1228 Ralph Willington and his wife Olympia built the Lady Chapel in St Peter's Abbey, Gloucester. Ralph also held (from Thomas de Beaumont, 6th Earl of Warwick (1208–1242) as overlord) the manor of Poulton in Awre, Gloucestershire.

Ralph II married Joan de Champernon, heiress of Umberleigh, during the reign of Edward I (1272–1307) was The descendants of Ralph II and Joan were as follows:

- Ralph de Willington (eldest son), called by Risdon "a worthy warrior", was governor of Exeter Castle in 1253 and Sheriff of Devon in 1254 or 1257. (The seat of the Sheriff of Devon was the royal castle of Exeter). He married Juliana de Lomene, daughter and heiress of Sir Richard de Lomene of "Lomen" (modern Uplowman, near Tiverton) and Gittisham.
- John de Willington (d.1338/9), eldest son and heir, who on 8 August 1299 obtained a royal licence to crenellate his mansion at Yate.

== Rail transport ==
Umberleigh railway station lies on the Tarka Line north of Portsmouth Arms and south of Chapelton. The service offers a direct connection to both Exeter and Barnstaple. All train services are provided by Great Western Railway.

== Sources ==
- Pole, Sir William (d.1635), Collections Towards a Description of the County of Devon, Sir John-William de la Pole (ed.), London, 1791, pp. 422–3, "Aderington"
- Risdon, Tristram (d.1640), Survey of Devon, 1811 edition, London, 1811, with 1810 Additions, pp. 316–8, Atherington
