= Atherington, Devon =

Village and civil parish in North Devon, England

Coordinates: 50°59′24″N 4°0′33″W

Atherington
- Village and civil parish
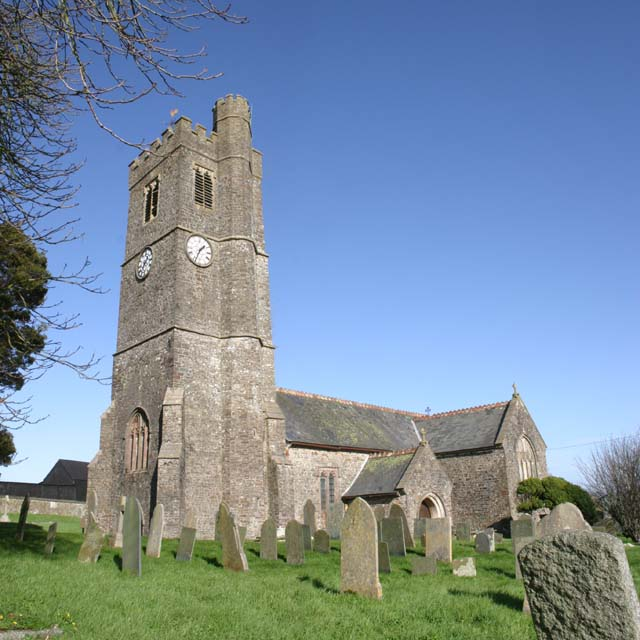
- St Mary's Church, Atherington
- Interactive map of Atherington
- Country: England
- Region: South West England
- County: Devon
- District: North Devon
- Civil parish: Atherington

Population (2001)
  - Total: 391

Atherington is a village and civil parish in the North Devon district of Devon, England, about 8 miles south of Barnstaple. According to the 2001 census the parish had a population of 391.

The church of St Mary is Perpendicular and was restored by J. L. Pearson in 1884. The church has a screen and gallery dating back 400 years, as well as a roodloft stairway of the same age. In the loft are Elizabethan heraldic panels.

There is also a 15th-century screen across the chancel, and a font of the same period. The north aisle part of the screen retains the original canopy and as such is unique in Devon (it was carved by two craftsmen from Chittlehampton c. 1540). The chancel section was brought here from Umberleign c. 1800. The benches have elaborate carved ends, and there is some very old stained glass.

Umberleigh railway station is located in the nearby village of Umberleigh which is a couple of miles away.
