= List of Fairbourne Railway rolling stock =

This is a list of past and present rolling stock used on the Fairbourne Railway, a 12 1/4 in (311 mm) narrow gauge preserved railway line running for 2 miles (3 km) from Fairbourne on the Mid-Wales coast to Barmouth Ferry on a spit of sand in the Mawddach Estuary opposite the town of Barmouth Welsh: Abermaw. The line was opened as a horse-drawn tramway in 1895 to carry building materials for Fairbourne village. Passenger carriages were introduced shortly afterwards to connect with the ferry to Barmouth. The line was converted to a 15 in (381 mm) steam railway in 1916 and became a successful tourist attraction. The line underwent another gauge conversion in 1985. The track was relayed at 12 1/4 in (311 mm) gauge and new rolling stock was introduced. The previous 15 inch gauge was restored as part of a dual gauge track from Fairbourne station as far as Car Park crossing over the winter of 2016/17 allowing the railway to play host to visiting 15 inch gauge stock usually as part of special events.

== Current stock (12¼ inch gauge) ==
The railway has a fleet of four steam locomotives which haul most of the passenger services. The steam locomotives are approximately half-size replicas of famous narrow gauge prototype locomotives such as the Class B Tanks from the Darjeeling Himalayan Railway and the Manning Wardle Tanks of the Lynton and Barnstaple Railway. Two diesel locomotives and a battery electric shunter are used for engineering trains.

=== Steam locomotives ===
Image	Identity	Builder	Type	Built For	Year built	Livery	Notes	Current status
	Sherpa	Milner Engineering	0-4-0ST	Réseau Guerlédan	1978	Darjeeling Himalayan Railway blue	Model of a Darjeeling Class B Tank locomotive, fitted with a tender to accommodate the driver and carry water.	In Service
	Russell	Milner Engineering / Fairbourne Locomotive Works	2-6-4T	Réseau Guerlédan	1979	Red	Model of Welsh Highland Railway locomotive Russell. Rebuilt from 'Elaine', a Leek and Manifold model in 1985.	In Service
	Beddgelert	David Curwen	0-6-4ST	Réseau Guerlédan	1979	Lined Black	Model of North Wales Narrow Gauge Railways locomotive.	Major overhaul started
	Yeo	David Curwen	2-6-2T	Réseau Guerlédan	1978	Malachite Green with lettering	Model of Lynton and Barnstaple Railway locomotive, Yeo	In Service

=== Diesel locomotives ===
Image	Name	Builder	Type	Built For	Year built	Livery	Notes	In Traffic?
	Gwril	Hunslet	4wDH	Singapore	1994	Blue	Diesel locomotive, acquired from Alan Keef in November 2007. Re-gauged from 2 ft (610 mm) at Fairbourne. It is the third locomotive to carry the name Gwril.	Yes
	Tony	Guest Engineering / Fairbourne Locomotive Works	A1-1A	Fairbourne Miniature Railway	1961	Green with yellow details and Fairbourne crest	Originally built as a double cabbed 15 inch gauge locomotive Sylvia, it was re-gauged and re-bodied in 1985 and carried the name Lilian Walter. A further rebuild to return the loco to double cabbed form was started in 2010.	Undergoing Overhaul

=== Carriages ===
The railway has a fleet of 22 passenger carriages, most of which are wooden bodies examples originating from the Réseau Guerlédan railway in France. The standard livery is blue. The fleet compromises of 3 semi open balcony coaches, 1 semi open standard coach, 3 fully open toast-rack coaches, 2 opens ex Butlins, 9 closed carriages, 1 wheelchair accessible closed carriage, 2 brake vans/saloons and 1 brake van/wheelchair accessible coach.

=== Wagons ===
There are a small pool of goods vehicles in use for engineering works.

== Former locomotives ==
=== 12¼ Inch Gauge ===
Image	Name	Builder	Type	Built For	Year built	Years at Fairbourne	Notes	Current location
	Number 24 (currently named Lucy-Lou)	Fairbourne Locomotive Works	2-6-2T	Fairbourne Railway	1990	1990–1992	Model of Sandy River & Rangeley Lakes Railroad locomotive. The first steam locomotive to be built at Fairbourne. Sold to the Bure Valley Railway in 1992 and re-gauged to 15 in (381 mm) gauge.	Cleethorpes Coast Light Railway, Lincolnshire
	Galloping Goose	David Curwen		Réseau Guerlédan	1979	1984–1989	Model of Rio Grande Galloping Goose Railcar. Made several trips along the line in 1987, before scrapping in 1989. Picture	Scrapped at Fairbourne in 1989.
	TJ Thurston	John Thurston	4-6-2	Believed to be Hayling Island	1949	2004–2008	This locomotive has narrow scale wheels which proved unsuitable for the railway's track. The locomotive was sold in 2008.	Private location
	Gwril	Fairbourne Locomotive Works	4wBE	Fairbourne Railway	1987	1987-2011	Battery electric shunting locomotive. The second locomotive on the line to carry the name Gwril. Sold in 2011.	N/A

=== 15 Inch Gauge ===
Between 1916 and 1985, the railway had a variety of steam and internal combustion locomotives from a variety of different manufacturers including Bassett Lowke and Guest Engineering. Following the re-gauging of the line in the 1980s, most of the 15 in (381 mm) gauge left the site and many have been restored and can be found working on other 15 inch lines around the world.

Name	Builder	Type	Built For	Year built	Years at Fairbourne	Notes	Current location
Prince Edward of Wales	Bassett-Lowke	4-4-2	Narrow Gauge Railways Ltd	1915	1916–1923	Bassett-Lowke improved "Little Giant" Class 20. The first locomotive to operate at Fairbourne. Apparently destroyed by fire at Southport in 1931, rebuilt and renamed Princess Elizabeth Now in the United States.	United States of America.
Katie	Arthur Percival Heywood	0-4-0T	Eaton Hall Railway	1896	1923–1926	Built for the Duke of Westminster's Eaton Hall Railway in Cheshire and also operated on the Ravenglass and Eskdale Railway	Frames with Ravenglass Heritage Group for restoration.
Count Louis	Bassett-Lowke	4-4-2	Count Louis Zborowski	1924	1925–1987	Bassett-Lowke "Sans Pareil" Class 30. Rebuilt with larger tender and other improvements at Fairbourne. This locomotive was the flagship of the Fairbourne Railway for many years.	Private Site
Prince Charles	Guest Engineering	4-6-2	Dudley Zoo Railway	1946	1960-1	Scale model based on a Stanier Class 5 locomotive. Now renamed Prince William. It has also carried the name Winston Churchill.	Evesham Vale Light Railway, Worcestershire
Ernest W Twining	Guest Engineering	4-6-2	Dudley Zoo Railway	1950	1961–1984	Loaned to the railway 1961-1964 and subsequently purchased. Sold and exported to Japan in 1987.	Shuzenji Romney Railway, Japan. Stored out of traffic
Siân	Guest Engineering	2-4-2	Fairbourne Railway	1963	1963–1985	Sister locomotive to Katie. Rebuilt extensively in 1984 to an American outline and renamed Sydney. Now owned by the Siân Project Group and restored to her original form.	Kirklees Light Railway, West Yorkshire
Katie	Guest Engineering	2-4-2	Dudley Zoo Railway	1954	1965–1985	The second locomotive on the line to carry the name Katie. Visually similar to Siân but without air tank on the tender. Operated the 1985 season named Shon	Kirklees Light Railway, West Yorkshire
Whippit Quick	R A Lister and Company	0-4-4	Fairbourne Miniature Railway	1935	1935–1975	The first internal combustion locomotive on the railway. Originally a standard Lister Rail-Truck it was rebuilt in the 1950s with an extended frame and additional 4-wheeled bogie (to a Bassett-Lowke design)to make it an 0-4-4. A futuristic bodywork was also fitted subsequently to protect the driver from the elements. It was sold in 1975 to Rich Morris and was displayed at Gloddfa Ganol until 1997.	Fairbourne Railway
Gwril	R A Lister and Company	0-4-0DM		1943	1947–1985	Similar to Whippit Quick, Gwril was originally 2 ft (610 mm) gauge, regauged for use at Fairbourne	Fairbourne Railway
Dingo	Wilkins and Mitchell	B′B′	Fairbourne Railway	1949	1952–1974	Dismantled in 1974. Parts of the frame were used in the construction of the six-way carriage shed turnout.	Scrapped at Fairbourne in 1975.
Sylvia	Guest Engineering	A1-1A PH	Fairbourne Railway	1961	1961–1985	Double cabbed locomotive, rebuilt in 1985 to an American outline and renamed Lilian Walter.	Fairbourne Railway
Rachel	Guest Engineering	0-6-0	Shillingstone Railway, Dorset	1961	1961–1984	Small shunting locomotive designed for a 10 1/4 in (260 mm) gauge line in Dorset, however completed as a 15 in (381 mm) loco.	Cleethorpes Coast Light Railway, Lincolnshire
Tracy Jo	Guest Engineering	2-6-2	Dudley Zoo Railway	1964	1964–1966	Tested on the Fairbourne Railway in the 1960s. Tracey Jo was styled on the Vale of Rheidol tank engines as a steam outline locomotive. Rebuilt into a 2-6-4 steam locomotive Wroxham Broad which can often be seen masquerading as Thomas the Tank Engine	Bure Valley Railway, Norfolk

=== 18 Inch Gauge ===
Image	Name	Builder	Wheel arr.	Built For	Year built	Years at Fairbourne	Notes	Current location
	No 1	Regent Street Polytechnic	4-2-2		1896	1926–1936	Built by the students at Regent Street Polytechnic to a design by WG Bagnall. Purchased by the Fairbourne estate in 1926 from store at Kings Cross shed. See GNR Stirling 4-2-2	Sandy Bay Museum, Exmouth
