= Rolling stock of the Lynton and Barnstaple Railway =

Lynton and Barnstaple Rly rolling stock

The Rolling stock of the Lynton and Barnstaple Railway was one of the most distinctive aspects of the 1 ft 11 1/2 in (597 mm) narrow gauge line which ran for almost twenty miles across Exmoor in North Devon, England, from 1898 to 1935.

The locomotives appeared originally in a livery of plain lined green, and later on a black base, with chestnut under-frames, hauling passenger carriages coloured terracotta with off-white upper panels, and light grey goods wagons. The schemes were simplified as individual vehicles were repainted. With the take-over of the line by the Southern Railway in 1923, and the consequent arrival of a new locomotive - Lew - in 1925, the livery was slowly changed to the Southern Maunsell version for locos and passenger stock, and umber for the goods wagons. The loco headlamps which had been black under the L&B were re-painted red.

All of the original stock - sixteen passenger coaches and eighteen goods vehicles - were built to very high standards and supplied by the Bristol Wagon & Carriage Works. Norwegian-type couplings were used.

Replicas of locomotives Lew (Lyd) and Lyn were built in 2010 and 2017, respectively.

== Contractor's locomotives ==
Locomotives used during the construction of the railway

| Name | Works No. | Type | Builder | Notes |
|---|---|---|---|---|
| Excelsior | 970 | 0-4-2WT | Bagnall | Originally supplied to the Kerry Tramway |
| Slave | 1430 | 0-4-0ST | Bagnall | |
| Kilmarnock | 703 | 0-4-0ST | Andrew Barclay | |

== Original rolling stock (1898-1935) ==
Rolling stock of the original railway.

=== Locomotives ===
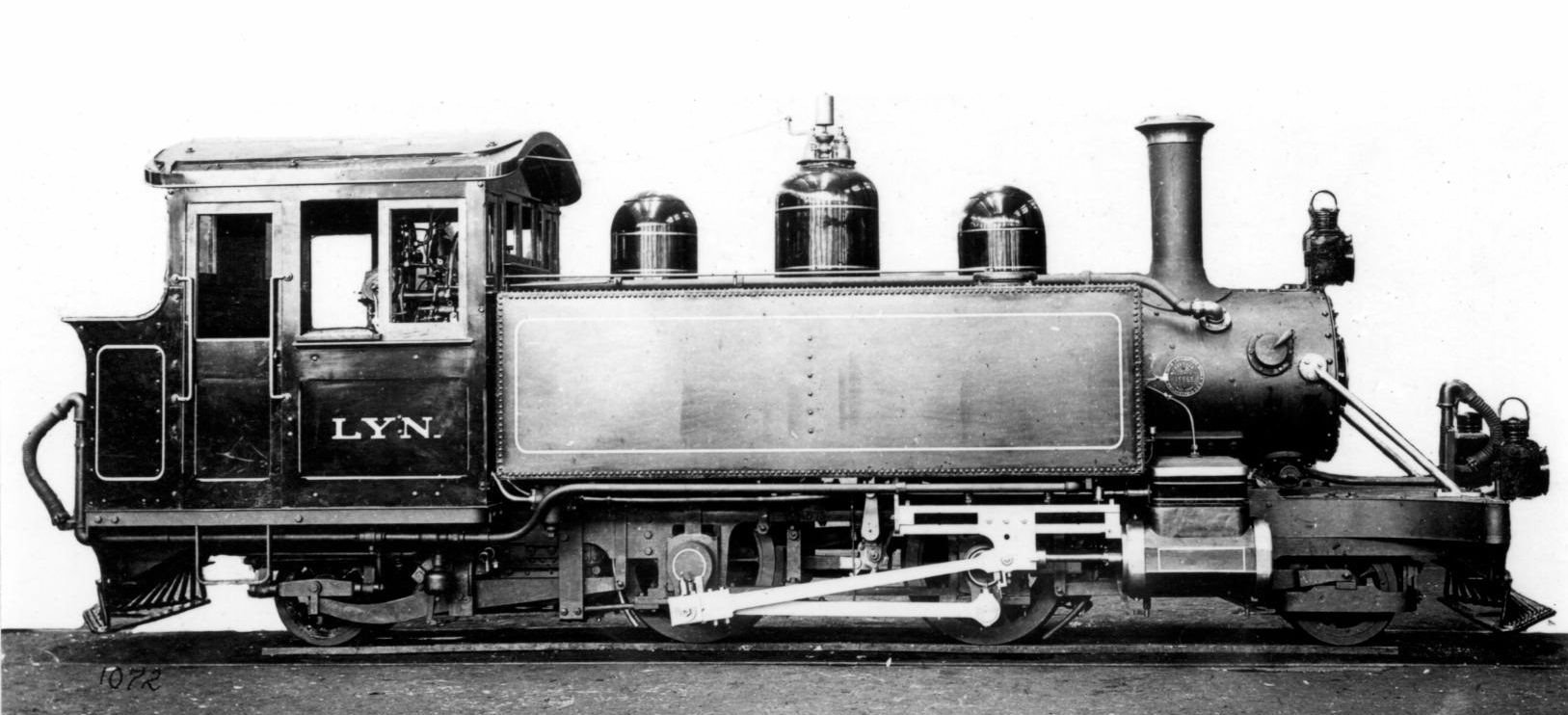
Baldwin Locomotive Lyn

| Name | Works No. | Type | Builder |
|---|---|---|---|
| Yeo | 1361 | 2-6-2T | Manning Wardle |
| Exe | 1362 | 2-6-2T | Manning Wardle |
| Taw | 1363 | 2-6-2T | Manning Wardle |
| Lyn | 15965 | 2-4-2T | Baldwin Locomotive Works |
| Lew | 2042 | 2-6-2T | Manning Wardle Improved |

=== Passenger stock ===
| L&B No. | SR number | Coach type | Builder | Build date | Notes |
|---|---|---|---|---|---|
| 1 | 6991 | Saloon brake end observation | Bristol Wagon & Carriage Works | 1897 | Some parts survive. Reconstruction by L&BR Essex group to commence in 2020 when van 23 is completed. |
| 2 | 6992 | Saloon brake end observation | Bristol Wagon & Carriage Works | 1897 | Preserved at National Railway Museum. |
| 3 | 2473 | Saloon end observation | Bristol Wagon & Carriage Works | 1897 | Some parts survive, awaiting reconstruction. |
| 4 | 2474 | Saloon end observation | Bristol Wagon & Carriage Works | 1897 | Some parts survive, awaiting reconstruction. |
| 5 | 6364 | Composite | Bristol Wagon & Carriage Works | 1897 | In service. Reconstructed 2016-2019, returned to Woody Bay 13 August 2019 as L&BR 5. Recommissioned September 2019. |
| 6 | 6365 | Composite | Bristol Wagon & Carriage Works | 1897 | |
| 7 | 2465 | Third centre observation | Bristol Wagon & Carriage Works | 1897 | In service. Reconstructed 2004, refurbished 2010-2013, returned to Woody Bay 16 April 2013 as L&BR 7. |
| 8 | 2466 | Third centre observation | Bristol Wagon & Carriage Works | 1897 | |
| 9 | 2467 | Third centre observation | Bristol Wagon & Carriage Works | 1897 | Some parts survive, awaiting reconstruction. |
| 10 | 2468 | Third centre observation | Bristol Wagon & Carriage Works | 1897 | Some parts survive, awaiting reconstruction. |
| 11 | 2469 | Third | Bristol Wagon & Carriage Works | 1897 | In service. Reconstructed 2013-2015, returned to Woody Bay 22 April 2015 as L&BR 11. |
| 12 | 2470 | Third | Bristol Wagon & Carriage Works | 1897 | |
| 13 | 2471 | Third | Bristol Wagon & Carriage Works | 1897 | |
| 14 | 2472 | Third | Bristol Wagon & Carriage Works | 1897 | |
| 15 | 6993 | Third Brake | Bristol Wagon & Carriage Works | 1897 | Now in regular service on the Ffestiniog Railway as their FR 14. After closure of the L&B, was left on the trackbed north of Snapper Halt. Removed by the FR in 1959 and rebuilt into a buffet car and named the Snapper Bar returning to operation in 1963. |
| 16 | 4108 | Third Brake | Bristol Wagon & Carriage Works | 1897 | In service. Reconstructed 2010-2013, returned to Woody Bay 18 September 2013 as L&BR 16. |
| 17 | 6994 | Composite Brake | Shapland & Petter | 1911 | In service. Reconstructed 2010-2013, returned to Woody Bay 16 April 2013 as L&BR 17. |

=== Goods stock ===
| L&B No. | Southern Number | Wagon type | Builder | Build date | Notes |
|---|---|---|---|---|---|
| 1 | 28304 | Open goods | Bristol Wagon & Carriage Works | 1897 | |
| 2 | 28305 | Open goods | Bristol Wagon & Carriage Works | 1897 | |
| 3 | 47036 | Goods van | Bristol Wagon & Carriage Works | 1897 | |
| 4 | 47037 | Goods van | Bristol Wagon & Carriage Works | 1897 | Preserved: awaiting restoration by L&BRT (Original number unknown but believed to be No4) |
| 5 | 56039 | Bogie brake van | Bristol Wagon & Carriage Works | 1897 | |
| 6 | 47038 | Goods van | Bristol Wagon & Carriage Works | 1897 | |
| 7 | 47039 | Goods van | Bristol Wagon & Carriage Works | 1897 | |
| 8 | 28306 | Open goods | Bristol Wagon & Carriage Works | 1897 | |
| 9 | 28307 | Open goods | Bristol Wagon & Carriage Works | 1897 | |
| 10 | 28308 | Open goods | Bristol Wagon & Carriage Works | 1897 | |
| 11 | 28309 | Open goods | Bristol Wagon & Carriage Works | 1897 | |
| 12 | 28301 | Bogie open goods | Bristol Wagon & Carriage Works | 1897 | |
| 13 | 28302 | Bogie open goods | Bristol Wagon & Carriage Works | 1897 | |
| 14 | 56040 | Bogie brake van | Bristol Wagon & Carriage Works | 1897 | |
| 15 | 47040 | Goods van | Bristol Wagon & Carriage Works | 1897 | |
| 16 | 47041 | Goods van | Bristol Wagon & Carriage Works | 1897 | |
| 17 | 28310 | Open goods | Bristol Wagon & Carriage Works | 1897 | |
| 18 | 28311 | Open goods | Bristol Wagon & Carriage Works | 1897 | |
| 19 | 28312 | Bogie open goods | ? | ? | Used in constructing the line |
| 20 | 28314 | Bogie platform wagon | Bristol Wagon & Carriage Works | 1902 | |
| 21 | 28315 | Bogie platform wagon | Bristol Wagon & Carriage Works | 1902 | |
| 22 | 28313 | Bogie open goods wagon | Bristol Wagon & Carriage Works | 1903 | |
| 23 | 56041 | Bogie brake van | L&BR | 1909 | Restored 2006. Undergoing renovation to include new steel underframe as of 2019. |
| 24 | 28303 | Bogie open goods wagon | L&BR | 1913 | |
| - | 28316 | Bogie open wagon | James & Frederick Howard | 1927 | |
| - | 28317 | Bogie open wagon | James & Frederick Howard | 1927 | |
| - | 28318 | Bogie open wagon | James & Frederick Howard | 1927 | |
| - | 28319 | Bogie open wagon | James & Frederick Howard | 1927 | |
| - | 441S | Travelling crane | Chambers, Scott & Co. | 1927 | |
| - | 442S | Travelling crane | Chambers, Scott & Co. | 1927 | |
| - | 441S | Crane match truck | Southern Railway | 1927 | |
| - | 47042 | Bogie goods van | James & Frederick Howard | 1927 | Preserved: awaiting restoration by L&BRT (Original number unknown) |
| - | 47043 | Bogie goods van | James & Frederick Howard | 1927 | |
| - | 47044 | Bogie goods van | James & Frederick Howard | 1927 | |
| - | 47045 | Bogie goods van | James & Frederick Howard | 1927 | |

== Modern stock (1995 – present) ==
Non-original rolling stock of the restored railway.

=== Locomotives ===
| Name | Works No. | Type | Builder | Build date | Notes |
|---|---|---|---|---|---|
| Axe | 2451 | 0-6-0T | Kerr Stuart | 1915 | Owned by the L&BR. Restored to steam 2008. Dedicated by the Bishop of Exeter 5 November 2008. Currently in ticket. |
| Sir George Newnes; Ex-Charles Wytock | 2819 | 4-4-0T | Bagnall | 1945 | Privately owned. Delivered to Woody Bay April 2014. Entered service May 2015. In 2019 the loco was bought by a consortium of L&B members and after overhaul, including fitting new boiler re-entered service in August 2024. |
| Isaac | 3023 | 0-4-2T | Bagnall | 1953 | Privately owned. Restored at Ffestiniog Railway, delivered to Woody Bay November 2013. Left for Statfold Barn 2021. |
| Lyn | 92 | 2-4-2T | Alan Keef | 2017 | An improved new-build of the original Lyn. Delivered to Woody Bay in September 2017. |
| Pilton | 2393 | 0-6-0DM | Baguley | 1952 | Restored at Statfold Barn Railway, delivered to Woody Bay April 201 when it ran trial trains. Cummins engine fitted by Statfold Barn was found to be putting too much torque into the gearbox, especially when working on the continuous 1 in 50 gradient. Gardner 6LXB 180HP engine installed and cab modified to fit the L&BR. All-over black livery and numbered "D2393" Entered service in 2017. |
| Heddon Hall | 6660 | 0-4-0DM | Hunslet | 1965 | Entered service, at the end of 2005 in all-over black livery. During the Autumn of 2007 the loco was given a full engine overhaul and the exhaust was modified to vent through a bonnet-mounted pipe. |
| D6652 | 6652 | 0-4-0DM | Hunslet | 1965 | Entered service, 2012 in all-over green livery as "D6652" Not in service - awaiting attention to gearbox. |
| Yeo II | 2048 | 2-6-2T | Workshop X Killamarsh | 2026 | A copy of the Manning Wardle Lyd at the Ffestiniog Railway which is a copy of the original Lew. |
| Exe II | 2049 | 2-6-2T | Boston Lodge | 2027 | A copy of the Manning Wardle Lyd at the Ffestiniog Railway which is a copy of the original Lew. |
| Taw II | ? | 2-6-2T | ? | 2029+ | A copy of the Manning Wardle Lyd at the Ffestiniog Railway which is a copy of the original Lew. |
| Lew II | ? | 2-6-2T | ? | 2029+ | A copy of the Manning Wardle Lyd at the Ffestiniog Railway which is a copy of the original Lew. |

=== Coaching stock ===
As of May 2014, all passengers travel in restored original L&B Heritage Coaches, see table above.

=== Goods stock ===
| No. | Type | Builder | Build Date | Source | Livery | Notes |
|---|---|---|---|---|---|---|
| 12 | Bogie goods wagon | - | - | ex-MoD bogie flat wagon | | In service at Woody Bay |
| 50 | Flat wagon | - | - | ex-MoD Wagon | | In service at Woody Bay |
| 51 | Ballast Hopper | - | - | ex-MoD bogie flat wagon | | In service at Woody Bay |
| 51 | Flat wagon | - | - | ex-MoD wagon | | In service at Woody Bay |
| 52 | Flat wagon | - | - | ex-MoD wagon | | In service at Woody Bay |
| 53 | Bogie open wagon | - | - | - | | In service at Woody Bay |
| 54 | Bogie open wagon | - | - | - | | In service at Woody Bay |
| 54 | Goods van | - | - | ex-RAF Chilmark munitions van | Southern Goods | In service at Woody Bay |
| 60 | Brake van | - | - | ex-MoD Bogie brakevan | | SOLD |
| 61 | Goods van | - | - | ex-RAF Chilmark munitions van | L&B Grey | In service at Woody Bay |
| 62 | Goods van | - | - | ex-RAF Chilmark munitions van | L&B Grey | In service at Woody Bay |
| 63 | Goods van | - | - | ex-RAF Chilmark munitions van | Southern Goods | In service at Woody Bay |
| 64 | Goods van | - | - | ex-RAF Chilmark munitions van | Southern Goods | In service at Woody Bay |
| 65 | Goods van | - | - | ex-RAF Chilmark munitions van | L&B Grey | In service at Woody Bay |
| 28320 | Bogie goods wagon | - | - | ex-MoD bogie flat wagon | Southern Goods | In service at Woody Bay |
| 28322 | Bogie goods wagon | - | - | ex-MoD bogie flat wagon | Southern Goods | In service at Woody Bay |
| 56042 | Brake van | - | - | ex-MoD brake van | Southern Goods | In service at Woody Bay |

== Notes ==
- "Bagnall No. 2819 'Sir George Newnes'". www.lynton-rail.co.uk.
