= Yeo (locomotive) =

Lynton & Barnstaple Railway Yeo
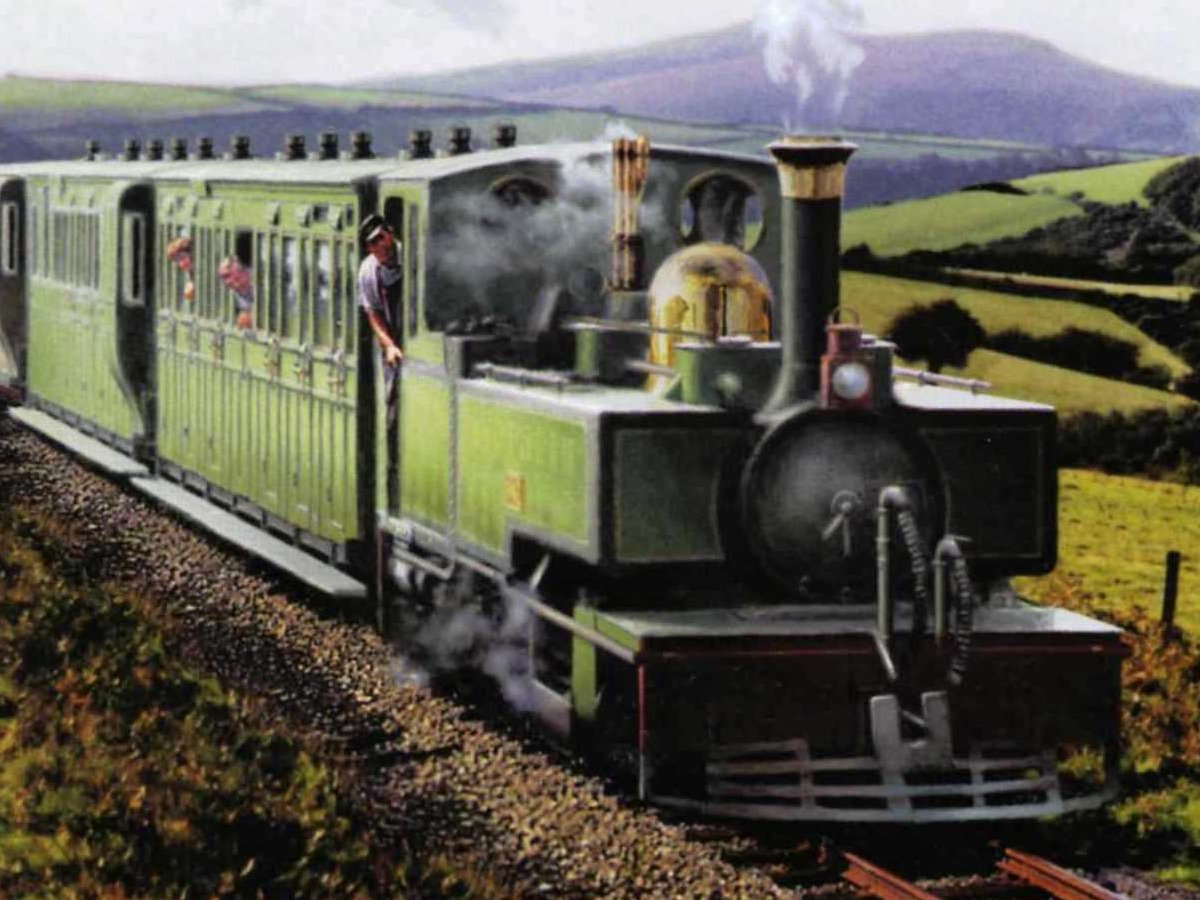
- Yeo and train approaching Woody Bay in Southern livery
Type and origin
- Power type: Steam
- Builder: Manning Wardle, Leeds
- Serial number: 1361
- Build date: 1898
Specifications
- Configuration
  - Whyte: 2-6-2T
- Gauge: 1 ft 11 1/2 in (597 mm)
- Leading dia.: 2 ft 0 in (0.610 m)
- Driver dia.: 2 ft 9 in (0.838 m)
- Trailing dia.: 2 ft 0 in (0.610 m)
- Wheelbase: Coupled: 6 ft 6 in (1.981 m); Total: 17 ft 9 in (5.410 m)
- Length: 22 ft 4 in (6.81 m) over buffer beams
- Width: 6 ft 7 in (2.01 m)
- Height: 8 ft 11 in (2.72 m)
- Loco weight: 22.05 long tons (22.40 t; 24.70 short tons)
- Fuel type: Coal
- Firebox
  - Grate area: 8.85 sq ft (0.822 m^{2})
- Heating surface: 383 sq ft (35.6 m^{2})
- Cylinders: Two, outside outside
- Cylinder size: 10.5 in × 16 in (267 mm × 406 mm)
- Valve gear: Joy
Career
- Operators: Lynton and Barnstaple Railway, Southern Railway
- Numbers: L&B: Yeo, SR: E759
- Locale: Devon, South West England
- Last run: 29 September 1935
- Scrapped: December 1935

Yeo was one of three narrow gauge 2-6-2T steam locomotives built by Manning Wardle in 1898 for the Lynton and Barnstaple Railway. The other two locomotives were named Exe and Taw. Yeo, like all the locomotives on the L&B, was named after a local river with a three-letter name, in this case the River Yeo.

This naming tradition has been continued in the 21st Century, with Lyd (a replica of Lew, the fourth locomotive built to this basic design) operational on the Ffestiniog Railway and the Welsh Highland Railway. It had been intended that Lyd would receive Yeo's original chimney (which survived on a steamroller for 62 years) but it was found to be too corroded for further use.

The naming tradition has also been applied to a Kerr Stuart Joffre class locomotive currently running on the revived L&B, which has been named Axe, and a Maffei locomotive named Sid.

Following the railway's closure in 1935 Yeo was scrapped along with all of the other L&B locomotives except Lew which was exported to South America.

A set of frames for a new Yeo were built by Winson Engineering in 2000 and are currently stored waiting for construction to continue when funds are available.

A 12 1/4 in (311 mm) gauge model was built by David Curwen in 1978 for the Réseau Guerlédan Chemin de Fer Touristique in Brittany, France. When the line closed, it transferred to the Fairbourne Railway in North Wales.

A 7 1/4 in (184 mm) gauge model was built by Milner Engineering in 1979 and worked in Buckfastleigh before moving to the Gorse Blossom Railway in 1984.
