= Réseau Guerlédan =

Overview
- Locale: Côtes-du-Nord
- Termini: Mûr-de-Bretagne; Caurel
- Stations: 2

Service
- Type: miniature railway

History
- Opened: 1978
- Closed: 1979

Technical
- Line length: 5 km (3.1 mi)
- Track gauge: 12 1/4 in (310 mm)
- Old gauge: 1,000 mm (3 ft 3 3/8 in) metre gauge

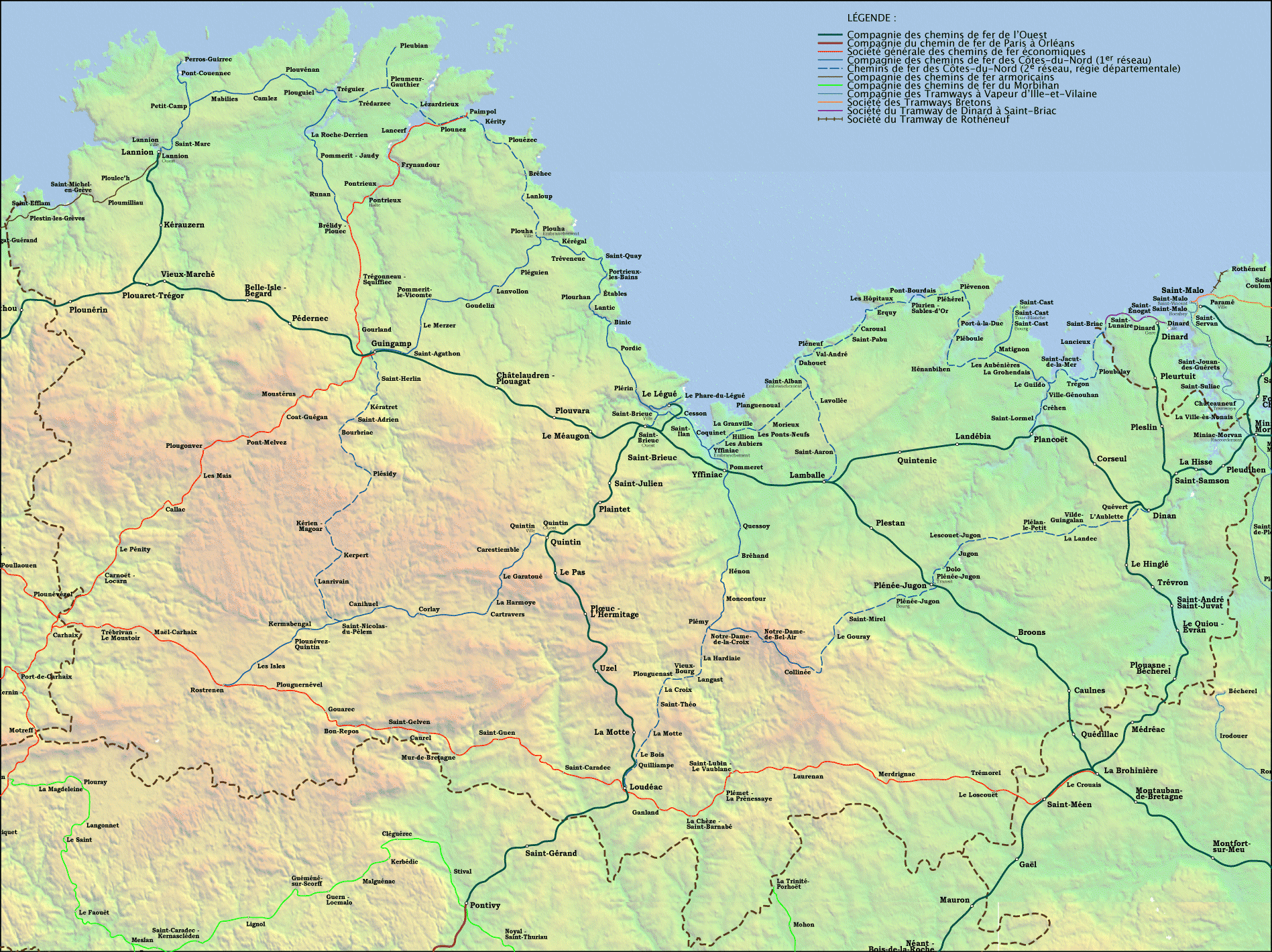
Railways in Côtes-du-Nord

Réseau Guerlédan was a short-lived railway in Côtes-du-Nord (now Côtes-d'Armor) which operated from 1978 to 1979.

== History ==
The Réseau Guerlédan was 5 kilometres (3.1 mi) in length, laid to a gauge of 12 1/4 inches (310 mm). It ran along the abandoned metre gauge trackbed of the Réseau Breton (RB). Statutory powers to operate the line were inherited from the RB because lengths of rail had been left in place where there had formerly been level crossings. With the opening of the line, the Réseau Guerlédan became the smallest (in terms of track gauge) public railway in the world, taking the title from the Romney, Hythe and Dymchurch Railway. A fleet of British-built steam locomotives, based on famous narrow gauge designs were produced for use on the line, however only two steam locomotives saw service on the line.

== Closure ==
The reason for the railway's closure was the occupation of the station at Caurel by the local mayor who subsequently let the facility to a member of his family. This seriously compromised the railway operation and as a result, the railway was cut back to terminate one kilometre (1,100 yd) from Caurel.

There is a myth that the railway was closed after a kidnap attempt on the owner's son and that the operating capital for the following season was employed in effecting his return. However, the son himself, Shôn Ellerton, has stated that he has no recollection of this.

== Locomotives ==
Four steam locomotives were built in the UK for the railway, all of which survive on the Fairbourne Railway. Only France and Jubilee were shipped to the Réseau Guerlédan - the remaining two were stored.

After closure, Jubilee, France, the Galloping Goose railcar and the rolling stock returned to the UK and were kept in storage until the Ellerton family purchased the Fairbourne Railway in North Wales in 1984. The stock has been in service there ever since. Jubilee was renamed Yeo and France was renamed Sherpa. Odd Job was left in France.

Image	Name	Builder	Wheel arr.	Year built	Notes
	France	Milner Engineering	0-4-0	1978	Model of a Darjeeling Himalayan Railway Class B Tank locomotive, fitted with a tender to accommodate the driver and carry water. Renamed Sherpa at Fairbourne
	Jubilee	David Curwen	2-6-2	1978	Model of Lynton and Barnstaple Railway locomotive, Yeo Renamed at Fairbourne
	Galloping Goose	David Curwen		1978	Model of Rio Grande Galloping Goose Railcar. Picture
	Odd Job				Small shunting locomotive

== Other locomotives ==
These locomotives were built for the line, however were never shipped to France.

Image	Name (Current Name)	Builder	Wheel arr.	Year built	Notes
	David Curwen	David Curwen	0-6-4	1979	Model of North Wales Narrow Gauge Railways locomotive. Originally named after its builder however on arrival at Fairbourne was renamed Beddgelert.
	Elaine	Milner Engineering	2-6-4	1979	Built as a model of a Leek and Manifold locomotive. and named after railway owner, John Ellerton's daughter, however never ran in this form. Rebuilt at Fairbourne into model of Welsh Highland Railway locomotive Russell.

== Rolling stock ==
The Réseau Guerlédan operated a number of carriages. As of 2011, three of these were located on the 15 in (381 mm) Evesham Vale Light Railway in Warwickshire, United Kingdom.
