= Winson Engineering =

Winson Engineering was a British manufacturer of narrow gauge and miniature railway steam locomotives and rolling stock during the 1990s. It built several new locomotives for heritage railways as well as undertaking major rebuilds of existing locomotives.

== History ==
Winson was founded in the mid-1980s, although it was not incorporated until 21 March 1990. The engineering works were initially at the harbour in Porthmadog. In 1988, the company moved to Penrhyndeudraeth. In 1995 the company moved again to Daventry. In June 2001 the company went into receivership and subsequently closed.

== Significant Projects ==
=== Rebuilds ===
- Rebuild of Welsh Highland Heritage Railway Bagnall Gelert
- Preparation of Ffestiniog Railway Fairlie 0-4-4-0T Livingston Thompson for display in the National Railway Museum
- Winson 7 Bure Valley Railway No. 1 2-6-4T Wroxham Broad, planned as steam but completed as steam-outline petrol-hydraulic 2-6-2 Tracy-Jo in 1964 by Guest Engineering & Maintenance (Ltd), re-built/restored to steam by Winson 1992

=== New locomotives ===
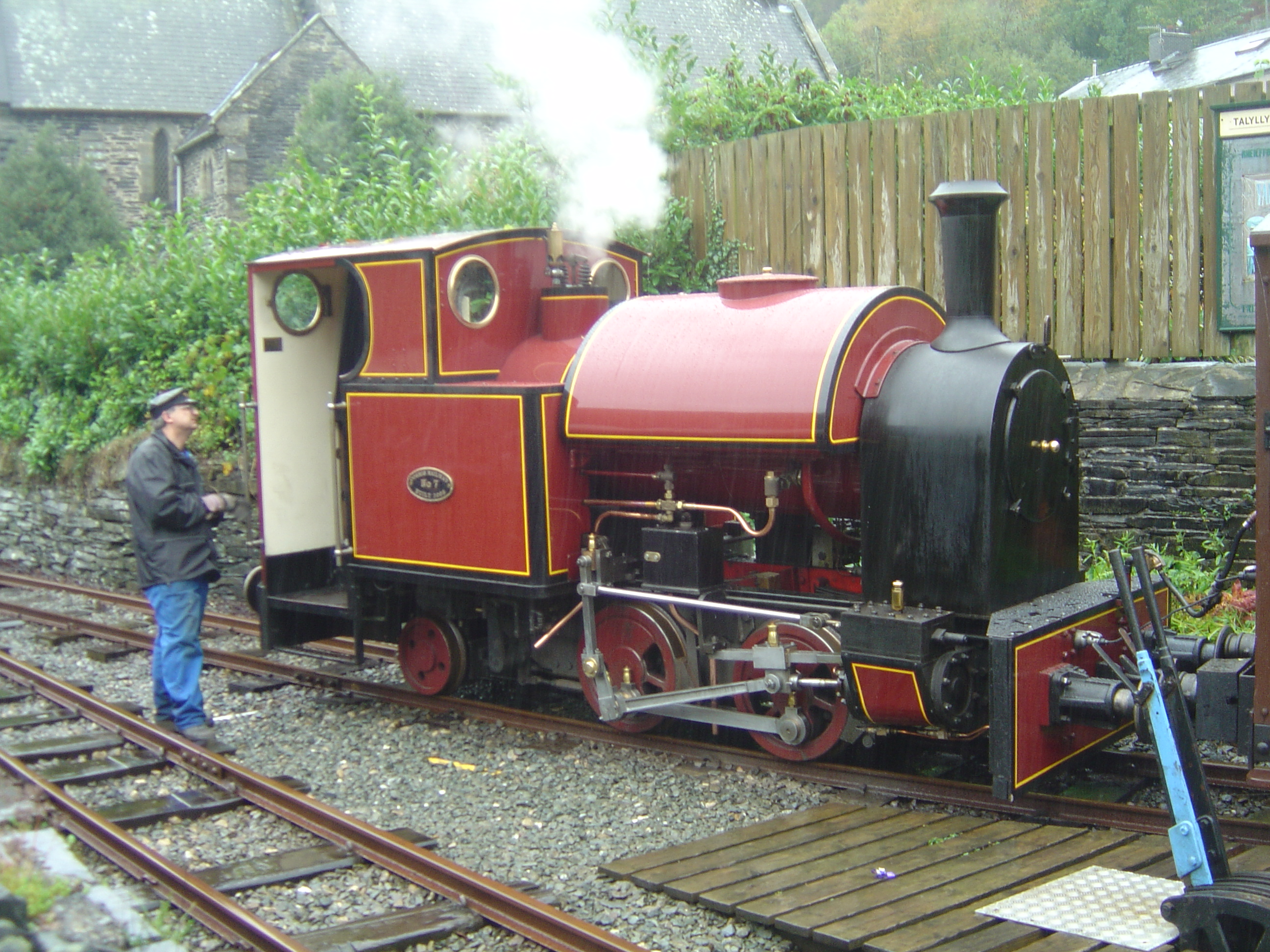
Corris Railway locomotive number 7

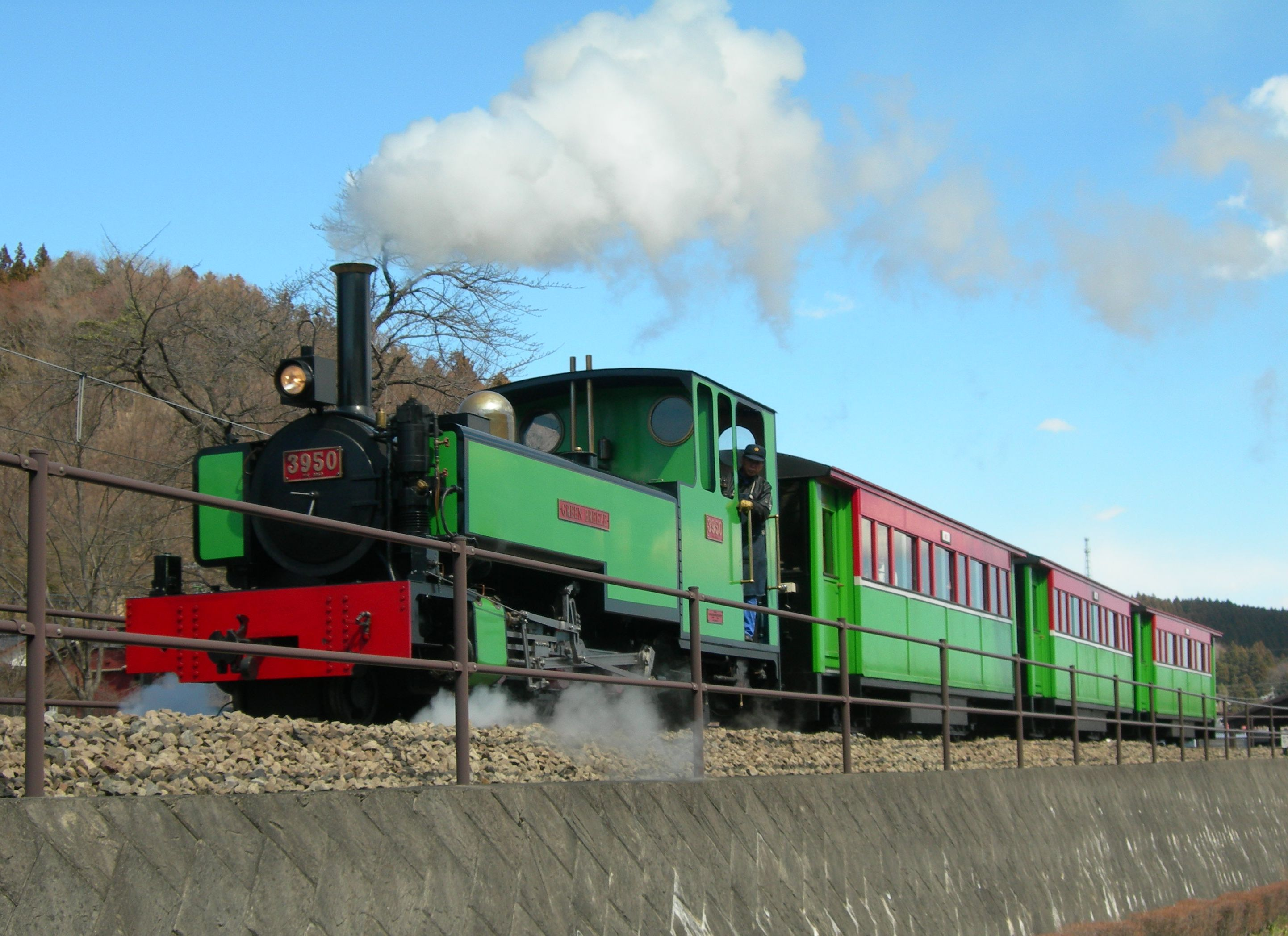
Poppo-Town SL train Apto-kun

- Winson 12 Bure Valley Railway No.6 ZB Class 2-6-2 Blickling Hall 15 in (381 mm) gauge, built 1994
- Winson 14 Bure Valley Railway No.7 ZB Class 2-6-2 Spitfire 15 in (381 mm) gauge, built 1994
- Winson 15 2-6-2T Camila 500 mm (19 3/4 in) gauge, built 1995 for Ferrocarril Austral Fueguino, Ushuaia, Tierra del Fuego.
- Winson 16 Bure Valley Railway No.8 ZB Class 2-6-2 oil-fired Thunder (now John of Gaunt, coal fired) 15 in (381 mm) gauge, supplied as parts and built by the Bure Valley Railway 1996/7.
- Winson 17 Corris Railway 0-4-2ST No.7 2 ft 3 in (686 mm) gauge, built 1999-2004 - work completed at Drayton Designs.
- Winson 19 2-6-2T "Abt Kun" 2 ft (610 mm) gauge, built 1998 for Tetsudou Bunka Mura Japanese Theme Park (Matsuida City).
- Winson 20 Bure Valley Railway No.9 ZB Class 2-6-4 Mark Timothy 15 in (381 mm) gauge, built 1999

At the time of liquidation the company was building a replica of the Manning Wardle locomotive Yeo for the Lynton & Barnstaple Railway. As of 2010, the frames were in storage awaiting further work.

Winson 20 Mark Timothy was unusable as delivered, and was subsequently rebuilt by Alan Keef Ltd in 2003.

=== New rolling stock ===
- Six carriages for the Welsh Highland Railway
- Four carriages built in 1996 for the Dresden Parkeisenbahn
