= Braunton Road rail accident =

1910 railway incident in England

Braunton Road railway accident

Details
- Date: 1 January 1910
- Location: Braunton Road, Devon
- Coordinates: 51.089°N 4.083°W
- Country: England
- Operator: Lynton and Barnstaple Railway

Statistics
- Deaths: 1

The Braunton Road railway accident occurred on 1 January 1910 in England. The Lynton & Barnstaple Railway maintained an exemplary safety record throughout its short existence from 1898 to 1935, with no passenger or member of the public having ever been injured or killed.

== Overview ==
There were, however, two accidents resulting in fatalities to railway employees. The other was at Chumhill.

On the morning of New Year's Day, 1910, Mr W. J. Hart, a platelayer, was killed when hit by one of the crossing gates he was belatedly attempting to open at Braunton Road, which in turn had been hit by the locomotive hauling the 06:20 mail train to Lynton. The train had earlier travelled from Pilton Yard to Barnstaple Town to collect the mail transferred from the L&SWR.

In the investigation that followed, it was discovered that parts of the interfacing to the Pilton signal box had been removed for repair, which had contributed to the accident.
