= Slade Reservoirs =

Reservoirs in North Devon, England

Lower slade reservoir
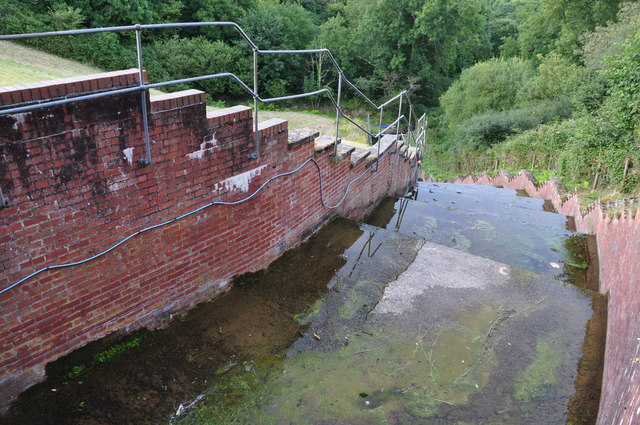
- Water leat on the lower reservoir

- Location within Devon Location within England Location within the United Kingdom
- Location: Ilfracombe, North Devon, England
- Coordinates: 51°11′25″N 04°08′22″W
- Type: Reservoir
- Primary inflows: West Wilder Brook
- Primary outflows: West Wilder Brook
- Basin countries: England
- Built: 1858
- Average depth: 5.6 m (18 ft)

The Slade Reservoirs are twin reservoirs in the North Devon town of Ilfracombe, England. They are owned by South West Water, and leased to South West Lakes Trust. While no longer used for water supply, they are used as fisheries (mainly the lower reservoir). The waterworks has since been demolished, Ilfracombe's main waterworks is now Hore Down Works on the outskirts of the town. Higher and Lower Slade Reservoirs were originally impounded for potable water supply but local knowledge suggests this reservoir is no longer used (and is considered natural by the enrvioment agency). The reservoir has a 6-acre mixed fishery (carp, bream, tench, perch, roach & pike) managed by SW Lakes Trust.

The reservoirs were built to supply water to the urban district of Ilfracombe. The reservoirs were insufficient so that Wistlandpound Reservoir was constructed. It was completed in 1956) and is now used as a fishery. Fishing here is restricted as a permit is required.

Upper Slade Reservoir
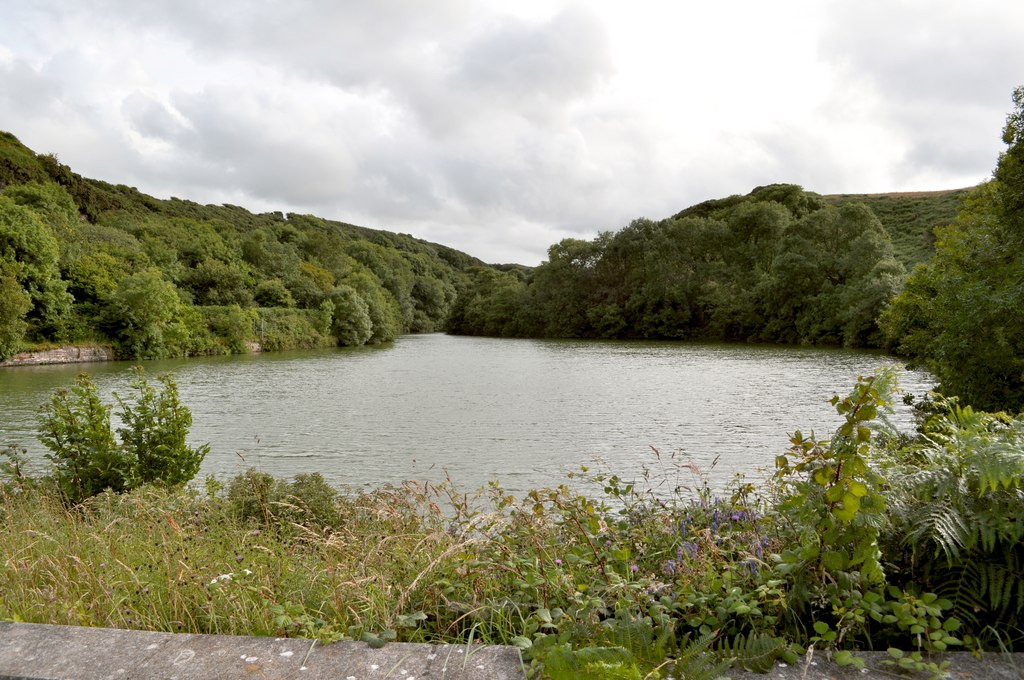
- Upper reservoir

- Location within Devon Location within England Location within the United Kingdom
- Location: Ilfracombe, North Devon, England
- Coordinates: 51°11′10″N 04°08′30″W
- Type: Reservoir
- Primary inflows: A small stream
- Primary outflows: West Wilder Brook
- Basin countries: England
- Built: 1859

Upper Slade Reservoir is a twin reservoir of Lower Slade Reservoir and served the same purpose. While it may seem that the river wilder is the primary inflow, it is not the wilder intercepts the spillway between the two reservoirs A staircase has been constructed between the dam and the former railway line between Barnstaple and Ilfracombe. Fishing is allowed in this reservoir, but is strictly limited and requires a special permit.

== History ==
In 2004 Charlotte Pinkney was murdered, more than 50 searches across North Devon and West Somerset took place. About 150 million litres of water was drained from two reservoirs that where near her home for police divers to look for clues. Even the sewer network was searched. No body was found.
