= Chumhill rail accident =

1913 accident in England

Chumhill railway accident

Details
- Date: 26 February 1913
- Coordinates: 51.1133°N 3.9737°W
- Country: England
- Operator: Lynton and Barnstaple Railway
- Incident type: runaway
- Cause: wet leaves on the line

Statistics
- Deaths: 2

The Chumhill railway accident occurred 26 February 1913 in England, killing two. The Lynton & Barnstaple Railway maintained an exemplary safety record throughout its short existence, from 1898 to 1935, and no passengers or members of the public were ever killed or injured.

== Overview ==
There were, however, two accidents resulting in fatalities to railway employees. The other was at Braunton Road.

On 26 February 1913, four men of the Chelfham Bratton track gang were travelling in wagon No. 10 - a 4-ton open. They were in possession of the token and the wagon contained leaves and debris collected from trackside cesses. Whilst running down the 1 in 50 gradient from Bratton Fleming to Chelfham, the speed increased and the vehicle's brakes were unable to control the descent. Upon reaching a sharp reverse curve by bridge 25, the wagon left the track, coming to rest at the foot of the bank.

George Barrow was killed outright and William Welch died a few days later on 2 March. They were both buried in Bratton Fleming churchyard. The two men who survived, Foreman Ganger George Dymond and F. Dinnicombe, attributed the accident to wet leaves on the line.

The wagon was recovered, repaired and returned to service, with the replacement planks left unpainted for some time after the accident.
