= Lyd (locomotive) =

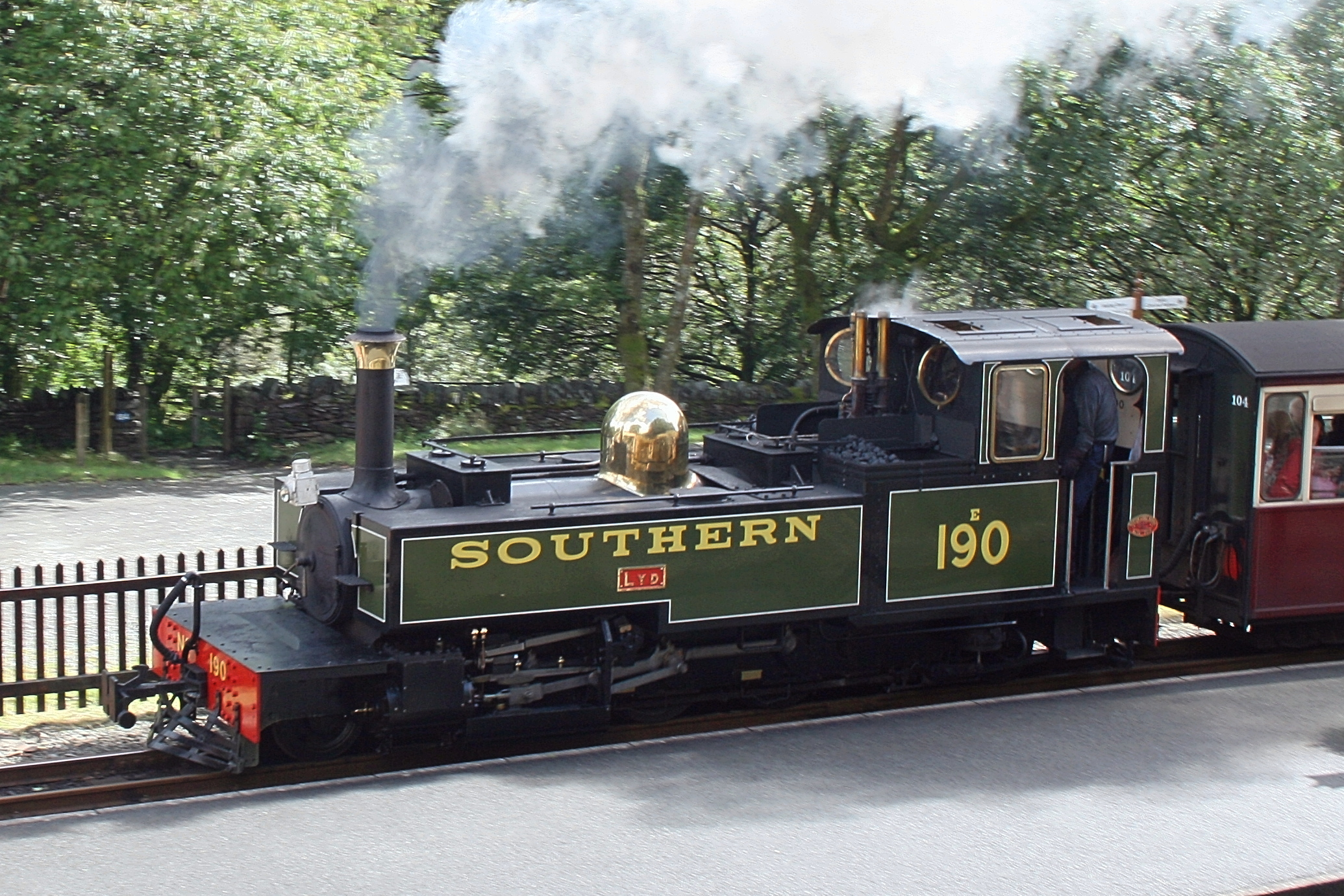
- Lyd at Tan-y-Bwlch station on the Ffestiniog Railway, now carrying SR green.
Type and origin
- Power type: Steam
- Builder: Ffestiniog Railway
- Serial number: 14
- Build date: Steamed 2 May 2010
Specifications
- Configuration
  - Whyte: 2-6-2T
- Gauge: 1 ft 11 1/2 in (597 mm)
- Length: 28 feet (8.5 m)
- Axle load: 6.5 tons
- Adhesive weight: Front driver: 6.5 tons Mid driver: 6 tons Rear driver: 5 tons
- Loco weight: 25 long tons (25,000 kg)
- Fuel type: Oil (to 2011); Coal (since December 2011)
Career
- Disposition: Operational

Lyd is a narrow gauge steam locomotive built by the Ffestiniog Railway in their own Boston Lodge shops over a period of 15 years.

Lyd is based on the design of the Lynton and Barnstaple Railway Locomotive E188 Lew which was built by Manning Wardle in 1925 for the Southern Railway, who owned the line at the time.

== Lew ==
Being the newest L&B locomotive (the others had all been in use since 1898), Lew was the only one not scrapped following the closure of the line in 1935. It was used to dismantle the line before being shipped overseas to South America (possibly Brazil), after which its fate is uncertain.

Although externally similar in appearance, to Lew, Lyd incorporates a number of modern design and construction techniques to improve overall efficiency. In order to navigate Garnedd tunnel, Lyd's cab is fitted with removable side panels to change the roof profile.

== Operation ==
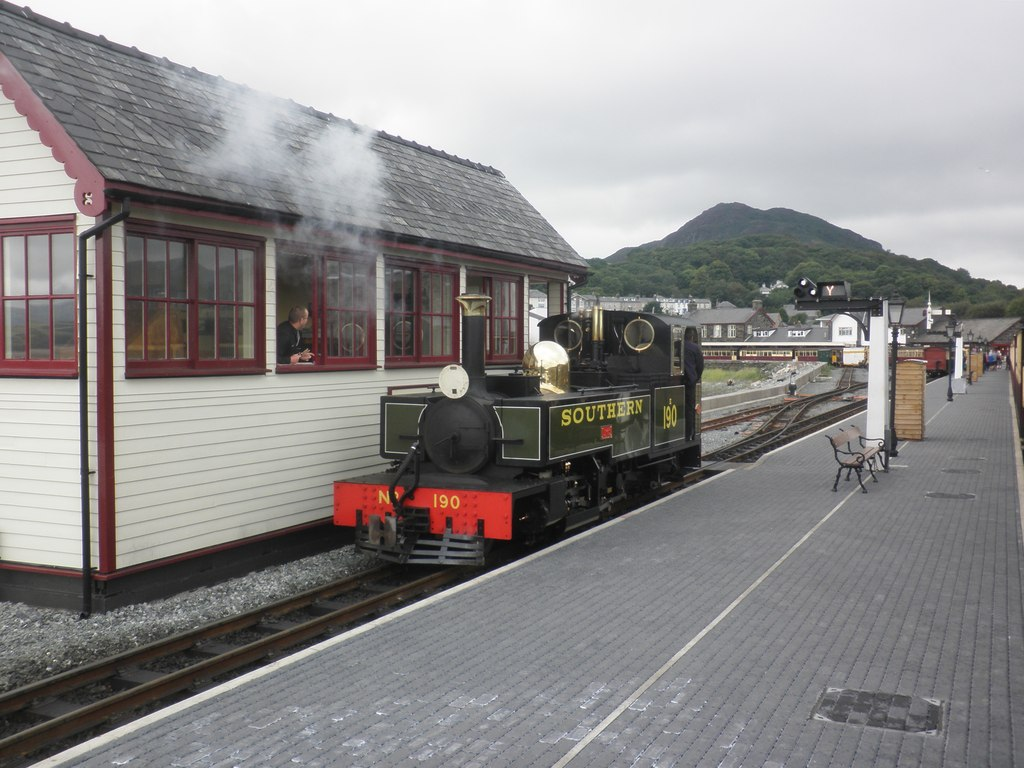
'Lyd' passes the signal box at Porthmadog

Lyd was first steamed on 2 May 2010 during Ffestiniog's Quirks and Curiosities event. Lyd was repainted into a primer coat black in July 2010. On 8 August 2010, Lyd first hauled a test train and, during Welsh Highland Railway's 2010 Superpower Weekend, was first used to hauled a passenger train. On the weekend of 18–19 September 2010, Lyd visited the Launceston Steam Railway, followed up by a visit to Woody Bay on the Lynton & Barnstaple for their Autumn Gala Weekend in September 2010, accompanied by ex-Lynton & Barnstaple coach 15 (now Ffestiniog coach 14) and Ffestiniog coach 102.

Lyd was painted in early 1950s British Railways lined black livery and carrying the number 30190. In September 2011, Lyd was repainted in Southern Railway Maunsell Green and numbered E190.

Initially completed as an oil-burner but designed for easy conversion, Lyd was converted to coal-burning during the autumn of 2011 and was first fired with coal on 12 December.

In November 2012, Lyd was on static display at the NEC in Birmingham as the key exhibit of Lynton and Barnstaple World - an L&B-themed group of model railway layouts exhibited at the Warley National Model Railway Exhibition.

== See also ==
- Lyn (locomotive)
- Rolling stock of the Lynton and Barnstaple Railway
- List of Ffestiniog Railway rolling stock
