= Wistlandpound Reservoir =

Reservoir in Devon, England

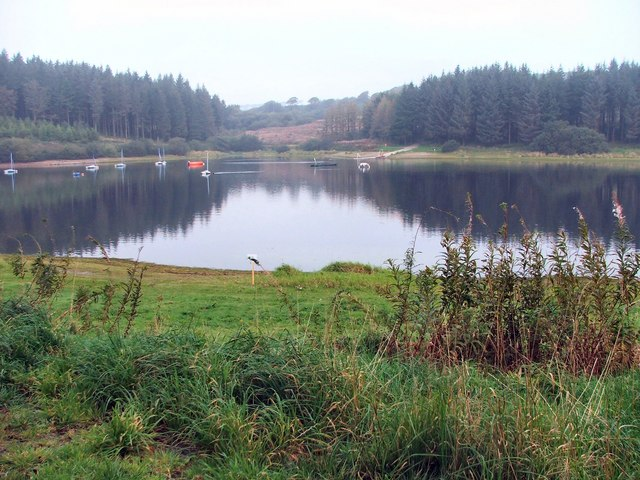
- The reservoir from the south bank

- Location within Devon
- Location: Devon
- Coordinates: 51.15839°N 3.94333°W
- Type: reservoir
- Basin countries: United Kingdom
- Surface area: 18 ha (44 acres)

Wistlandpound Reservoir is a reservoir in Devon, England owned by South West Water.

Although final completion was in 1957, the reservoir started supplying the Barnstaple area in September 1956. The earth embankment reservoir holds up to 475,597 cubic metres (16,795,500 cu ft) and covers an area of 18 hectares (44 acres). Situated close to Exmoor National Park, and managed jointly by Forestry England and The South West Lakes Trust, Wistlandpound is a popular recreation area, with bird watching, trout fishing, as well as boating and nature walking among the most popular activities.

Calvert Devon has a centre at the Reservoir, providing holiday and activity facilities for those with disabilities and their families, plus schools and large groups.

The construction of the reservoir flooded part of the formation of the Lynton and Barnstaple Railway, which can still be seen when water levels are low. The railway, which is being reconstructed, will follow an alternative route around the side of the reservoir.

Wistlandpound reservoir is located at grid reference SS642417.

The reservoir is used as a water supply, it supplies water to the (former) Ilfracombe urban district (Ilfracombe, Berrynarbour, Combe Martin, etc). Since the disuse of the Slade reservoirs this task has fallen to Wistlandpound reservoir; for a short time they would have co-existed as a water supply.
