= Lynton and Barnstaple Railway =

Narrow gauge railway in Devon, England

Coordinates: 51.10388°N 3.98690°W

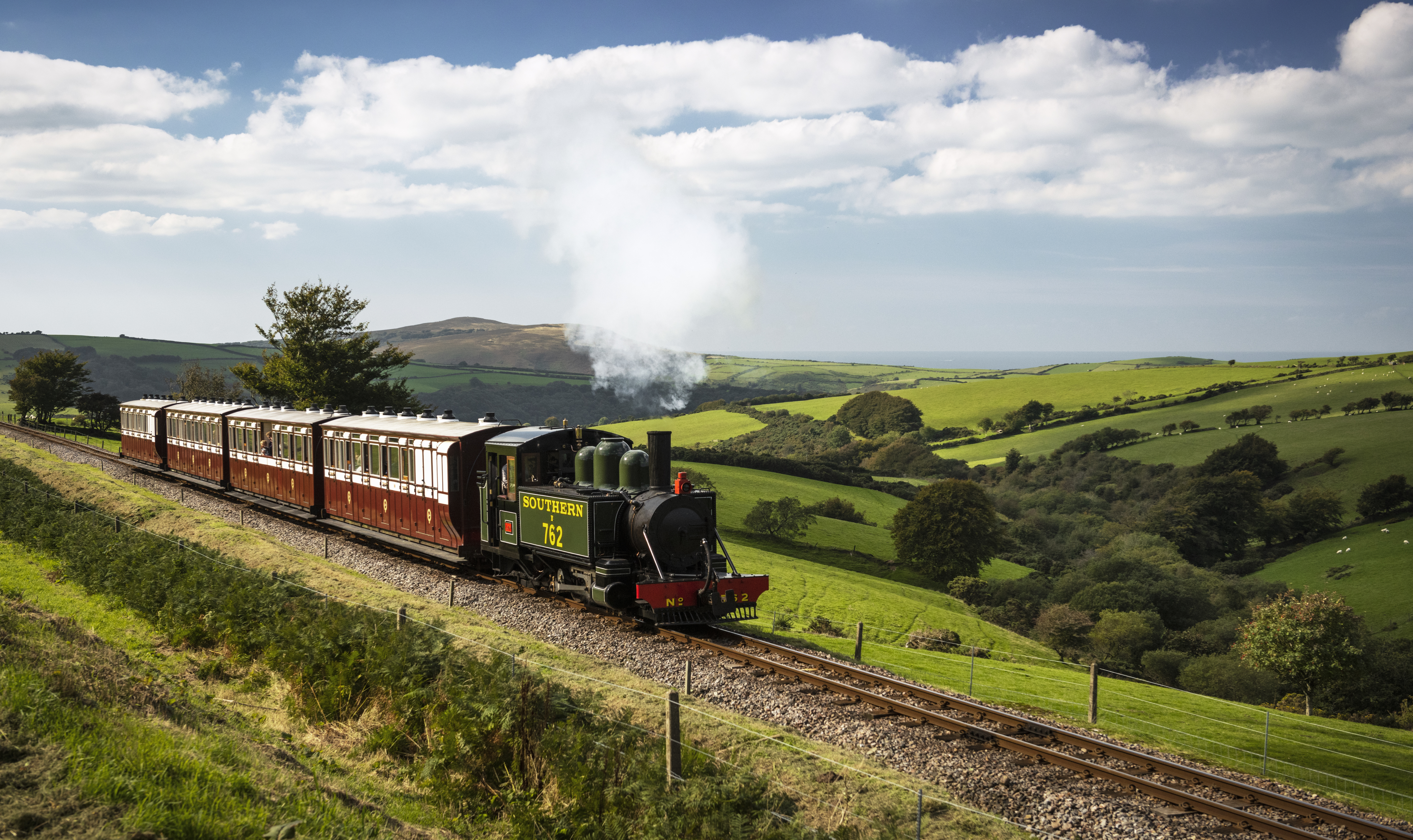
- Lyn at Woody Bay in 2017
- Locale: Exmoor, Devon, England
- Terminus: Lynton & Lynmouth

Commercial operations
- Name: Lynton & Barnstaple Railway
- Built by: Promoter: Sir George Newnes, Bart. Engineer: James Szlumper; Contractor: James Nuttall
- Original gauge: 1 ft 11 1/2 in (597 mm)

Preserved operations
- Owned by: Lynton and Barnstaple Railway Trust
- Operated by: Lynton and Barnstaple Railway Co. Ltd.
- Stations: 2
- Length: 0.9-mile (1.4 km)
- Preserved gauge: 600 mm (1 ft 11 5/8 in)

Commercial history
- Opened: 11 May 1898
- Closed: 29 September 1935
- Preserved era: Woody Bay: mid-1930s

Preservation history
- 1979: L&BR Association formed
- 1993: Railway Company formed
- 1995: Woody Bay station purchased
- 2000: Association reformed as Trust
- 2004: First train from Woody Bay, 17 July
- 2005: Bridge 67 reinstated
- 2006: Killington Lane opened
- 2007: Over 100,000 passengers carried since reopening
- 2008: L&B's first steam loco since 1935 – "AXE" – returned to steam
- 2010: "Lyd" – visits Woody Bay
- 2013: Three restored Heritage Coaches re-enter service and ISAAC – Bagnall 0-4-2T No. 3023 of 1953 enters service
- 2017: New build replica of "Lyn" is completed and unveiled

The Lynton and Barnstaple Railway (L&B) was a single track, 1 ft 11 1/2 in (597 mm) narrow gauge railway. It opened in May 1898 and ran for slightly more than 19 miles (31 km) through the area bordering Exmoor in North Devon, England. Although it opened after the Light Railways Act 1896 came into force, it was authorised and constructed before that act. It was authorised under its own act of Parliament and built to higher (and more costly) standards than similar railways of the time. It was notable as the only narrow gauge railway in Britain that was required to use main-line standard signalling. For a short period, it earned a modest return for shareholders, but for most of its existence it made a loss. In 1923, the L&B was taken over by the Southern Railway, and closed in September 1935.

The Lynton and Barnstaple Railway Trust was formed in 2000; and a short section was reopened to passengers in 2004. This was extended in 2006; and the following year plans were announced to open 9 miles (14 km) of track, linking the station at Woody Bay to both Lynton (at a new terminus on an extension to the original line, closer to the town) and Blackmoor Gate, and to a new station at Wistlandpound Reservoir. The present track is now 600 mm (1 ft 11 5/8 in) narrow gauge.

== History ==
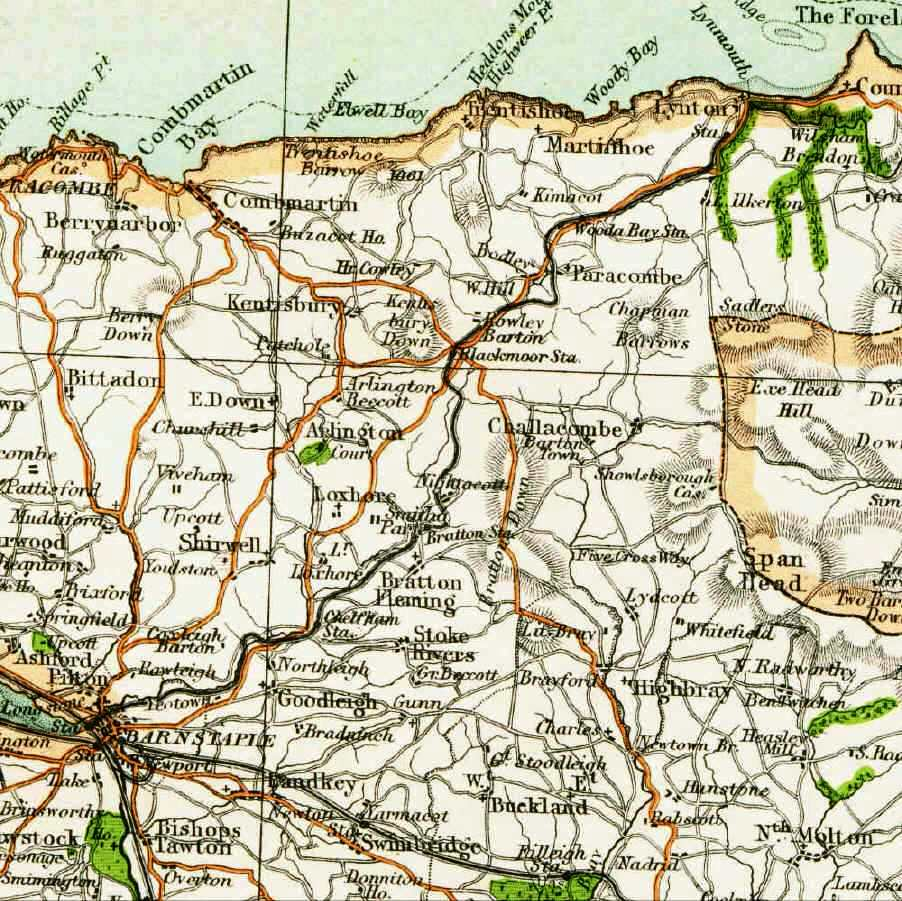
Extract from an early contemporary map showing the route

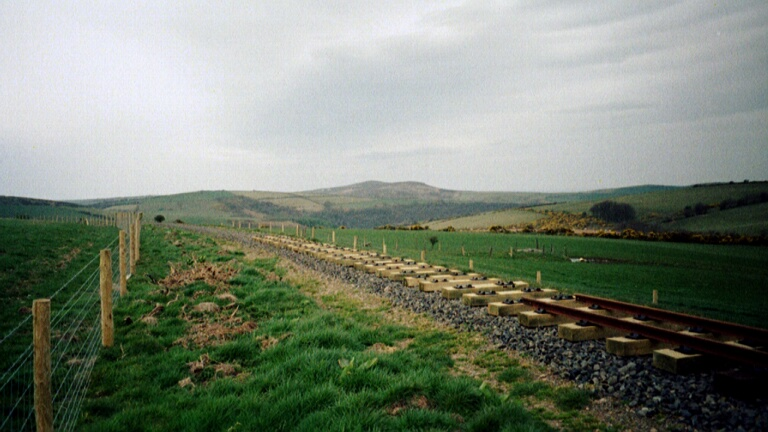
From 700 feet (210 m) up on Exmoor, looking towards the hilltops, and beyond, the sea...

Following the opening of the Devon and Somerset Railway to Barnstaple, there were calls for an extension to serve the twin towns of Lynton and Lynmouth, which were popular with holiday-makers.

Through the middle of the 19th century, several schemes were proposed, from established railway companies and independent developers. One scheme suggested electric power, while another proposed a line from South Molton. None of these schemes offered sufficient prospects to encourage investment, and few got further than initial plans.

Lynton and Barnstaple Railway Act 1895
- Act of Parliament
- Parliament of the United Kingdom
- Long title: An Act for making a Railway between Barnstaple and Lynton in the County of Devon and for other purposes.
- Citation: 58 & 59 Vict. c. lxxii

Dates
- Royal assent: 27 June 1895

Due to the difficult terrain, one scheme suggested a 1 ft 11 1/2 in (597 mm) narrow gauge, already in use by the Festiniog Railway Company and elsewhere, to ease construction. This scheme was supported by Sir George Newnes, publisher of Titbits and The Strand Magazine who became chairman of the company. Another proposal was to build it as a monorail on the Lartigue principle. The Lynton and Barnstaple Railway Act 1895 (58 & 59 Vict. c. lxxii) was passed on 27 June 1895, and James Szlumper was the consulting engineer for the work.

The line opened on 11 May 1898 with public service commencing on 16 May, connecting with trains from Waterloo on the Ilfracombe Branch Line at Barnstaple Town.

The scheme did not meet with universal enthusiasm, and from the beginning, there were some who doubted the true intentions of the promoters. Although many of the sinuous curves and deviations were due to having to maintain a 1 in 50 gradient where there was no leeway (most observers being oblivious to the fact that a straighter shorter line would have made the gradient even steeper), several were due to resistance by local landowners along the route.

A guide published whilst the line was being built stated:

On the highest point at Lynton a pretentious mansion has been built for himself by the proprietor of a certain well known publication, whom some look on as the benefactor and others as the evil genius of the place. Through his enterprise it is that the "lift" was made in 1888, to be cursed by conservative and artistic souls, but blessed by unwieldy bodies and rheumatic limbs; he has also favoured the railway, now a fait accompli, and the pier which seems so much wanted. Yet whatever may be said of the railway, there is good reason for doubting if the pier would be a real advantage. It would certainly flood the place with a class of excursionists for whom there is little accommodation, and on whom, for the most part, its characteristic beauties would be thrown away.

The L&B seldom attracted sufficient passengers to remain viable. The journey of nearly 20 miles (32 km) took on average an hour and a half. To satisfy several influential residents, the terminus at Lynton was some distance from the town itself, and from the cliff railway to Lynmouth.

Declining tourism during the First World War, improved roads, increased car ownership further depleted the line's income until it was no longer economic.

A guidebook published in 1921 described the situation:

The railway which has made this corner more accessible is of narrow gauge, requiring a change of carriage at the Town station, Barnstaple. ... Unfortunately, this line does not seem to be a financial success, and its service, out of season at least, is not a very liberal one.

Despite numerous cost-saving measures and extra investment in the line, the Southern Railway was unable to reverse the trend, and closed the line.

The last train ran on 29 September 1935. An observer at the time wrote:

Rarely, if ever before, has the closing of a railway aroused such a keen interest as has been awakened throughout the country by the running of the last trains over the narrow gauge Barnstaple-Lynton section of the Southern Railway. This is to be attributed very largely to the unusual character of the line and the magnificent scenery through which it passes.

The Southern removed everything they could use elsewhere, and by 8 November, had lifted the track from Lynton to milepost 15⅓ – on the Barnstaple side of Woody Bay station. On 13 November an auction was held, although the railway failed to attract much interest. Most rolling stock, and every locomotive except for Lew, was scrapped at Pilton. Some coaches were sectioned for use as garden sheds. Third class seats became garden furniture, and first class seats found their way into local snooker halls and Masonic lodges. In December, Plymouth ship breaker Sidney Castle won the tender to dismantle the railway. The remaining track was lifted by June 1936, and in September, surviving locomotive Lew was shipped to Brazil. The stations and track bed were auctioned in 1938.

The L&B had an exemplary safety record, and no members of the public were killed or injured during its 37-year existence, although accidents at Braunton Road and Chumhill did claim the lives of three track workers.

== Route ==
A 1920s guide to the area described the route:

The line at first keeps up the winding course of the Yeo with Pilton church tower on the left, and that of Goodleigh presently, on the right, marking a side valley, for which the train stops at Snapper Halt, whence, by Goodleigh one might have an alluring ramble back to Barnstaple.

Chelfham (pron. Chellam) is reached by a fine viaduct over the tributary stream, where 2 miles (3.2 km) east stands Stoke Rivers, through which the above round might be extended. The line has now left the Yeo, mounting eastward up the Bratton Valley to Bratton Fleming Station near the lofty village of Bratton Fleming. The next station is Blackmoor (900 ft), lying under the tumuli of Kentisbury Down to the left, whence one might descend on foot to Lynton and Lynmouth (7 miles) or Ilfracombe (10 miles) from the crossroads at Blackmoor Gate.

The railway has next to wind around the deep hollow in which lies Parracombe (Fox and Geese Inn) [sic], where, near the halt platform, can be seen the tower of the old church, another of those said to have been built in expiation of Thomas à Becket's murder. Hence flows the Heddon water, which one might follow down its beautiful course by the Hunter's Inn. The cyclist will find a way diverging from the main road a little beyond Parracombe. At the last station, Wooda Bay, (Note: Wooda Bay station was actually renamed Woody Bay in 1901. The geographical feature Woody Bay after which the station was named was the subject of an attempt to develop it as a tourist resort to rival Lynmouth; a pier was even constructed. The developers felt that the spelling "Woody" was more attractive to tourists, and so changed it from the original "Wooda"; the station name was changed accordingly.) two miles (3 km) behind this place and its neighbour Trentishoe, the line has reached a highest point of about 1,000 feet (300 m). Beyond this, it crooks down the valley of the West Lyn (best glimpses on right hand), past Caffyn's Down Halt (for the golf links), ending some half-mile behind Lynton, and over a mile by the zig-zag road from Lynmouth.

The road (17 miles) keeps pretty much the course of the railway, except in the central stage, where it strikes a mile further north to Loxhore, before leaving the valley of the Yeo, then rejoins the railway at Blackmoor.

As well as several foot- and cycle-routes which can still be followed today, the hostelry in Parracombe mentioned in the article remains a popular venue (although the geese are now singular).

=== Gradient profile ===
The L&B rises and falls several times along its length. Starting at 15 feet (4.6 m) above sea level, The first 3 3/4 miles (6.0 km), through Barnstaple, and along the Yeo Valley stays relatively level. Collard Bridge marks the start of an 8-mile (13 km) climb, mainly at 1 in 50 (2%), to Blackmoor Gate. A shallower down-gradient of about 2 miles (3.2 km) follows towards Parracombe Bank, and the start of another climb of about 2 1/2 miles (4 km) to Woody Bay at 1,000 feet (305 m), the highest railway station in southern England. The line then falls, again mostly at 1 in 50, to Lynton & Lynmouth station, still 700 feet (213 m) above the sea and hidden by the landscape from the town of Lynton. The minimum radius on curves was 5-chain (100 m).

== Rolling stock ==
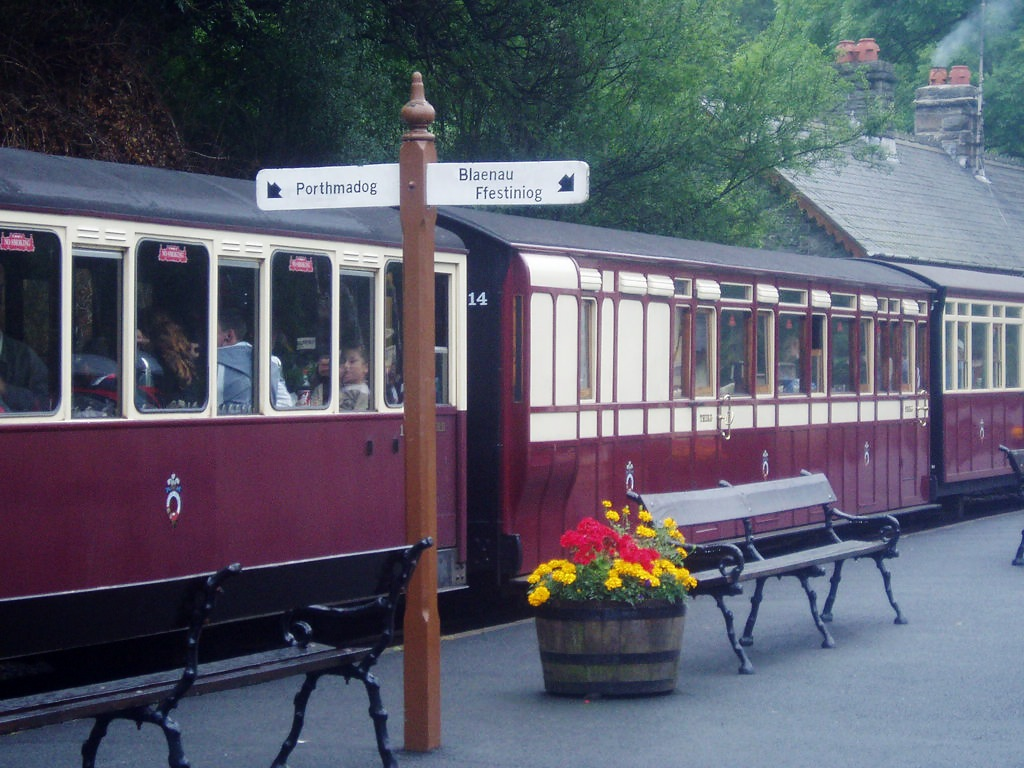
Ffestiniog coach No. 14 (ex-L&B No. 15) (centre) at Tan-y-bwlch

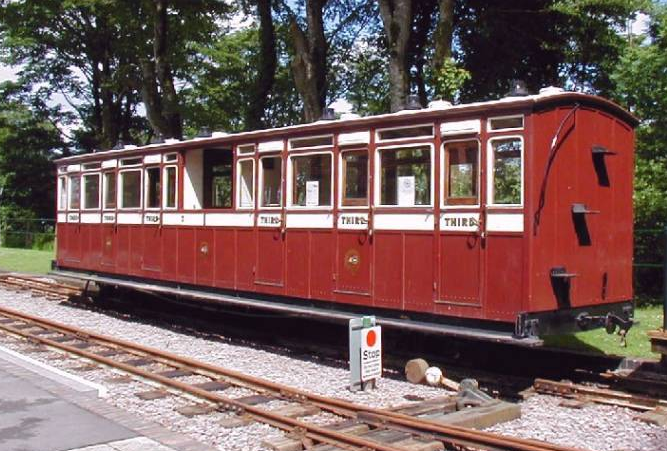
Coach 7 at Woody Bay, 2005

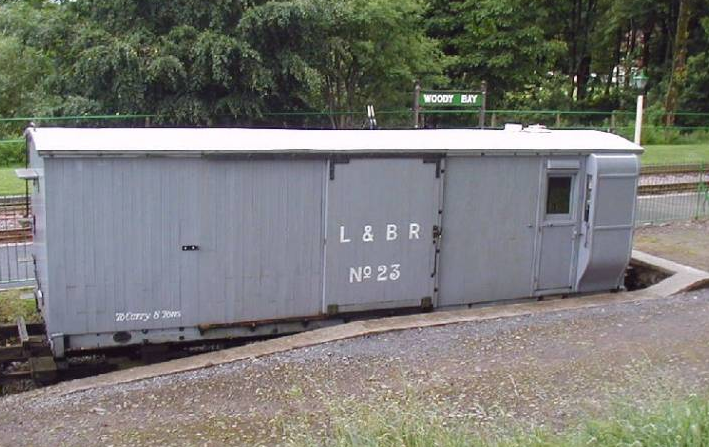
Van 23 in the loading bay, Woody Bay, 2005

=== Locomotives ===
At least four contractors' locomotives were used for construction. Unusually, some of the temporary track was wider than the final gauge – the section around Parracombe Bank for example, spanning the Heddon valley, was built to 3 ft (914 mm) gauge, with a locomotive known as Winnie. A fifth locomotive – perhaps named Spondon – may also have been used, although little is known of either of these. In 1900, Kilmarnock was sold by the L&B. It is believed to have been left behind by James Nuttall, as a result of the financial problems and litigation between railway and contractor.

The L&B used only coal-fired steam motive power. In 1896, the Hunslet Engine Company submitted two designs (a 2-4-2T and a 4-4-0T), but eventually an order was placed for three 2-6-2Ts from Manning Wardle & Co of Leeds. The locos were named after local rivers: Yeo, Exe, and Taw. These were supplemented by a 2-4-2T, Lyn, built by the Baldwin Locomotive Works of Philadelphia, USA, as the Company realised that three locos would be insufficient. Baldwin was selected as they could deliver the loco – based largely on standard components – more quickly than domestic suppliers, who had a backlog of orders, caused by a national engineering dispute over the 8 hour working day resulting in a lock-out by employers from July 1897 until January 1898. After construction by Baldwin, the loco was shipped across the Atlantic in parts, and re-assembled at Pilton by railway staff. It first steamed in July 1898. The Manning Wardles were delivered ahead of the lock-out, and Yeo and Taw were used in the final stages of construction. Exe was stored locally in a stable, where she received the unwelcome attention of thieves who stole various brass fittings and fixtures.

In 1923 the L&B was absorbed into the Southern Railway, and began an upgrade programme. All locos & coaches were repainted in Southern Maunsell Green livery, the wagons were repainted in Southern Umber livery and track and buildings were improved. A fifth locomotive, Lew was purchased in 1925, with improvements to the original Manning Wardle design.

==== Fate of Lew ====
Although bought at the auction (it is believed by Barwicks of London) by December 1935, Lew was working for Sidney Castle, the dismantler of the railway. This work was completed by July 1936 and in September, Lew was moved by rail to Swansea and loaded onto the S.S. Sabor destined for the state of Pernambuco, Brazil. Most of the relevant shipping records were destroyed in World War II.

=== Passenger stock ===
Sixteen passenger carriages were delivered for the opening. Built by the Bristol Wagon & Carriage Works Co. Ltd., these comprised six different types, all 39 ft 6 in (12.0 m) long, 6 ft (1.8 m) wide, (7 ft 4 in or 2.2 m over steps) and 8 ft 7 in (2.6 m) high – large by narrow gauge standards.

The coaching stock was solidly constructed, and offered levels of accommodation far in advance of anything else at the time – certainly compared to any other narrow gauge railway. Almost 70 years later, the design was used as the basis for a new rake of carriages built by the Ffestiniog – testament to the excellence of the original design.

The body for coach 17 was built in 1911, by local firm Shapland and Petter, and mounted on a steel underframe constructed by the railway in its own workshops at Pilton. Marginally longer than the earlier coaches, it contained both smoking and non-smoking accommodation for first and third class passengers, as well as the brake van space.

=== Goods stock ===
The open goods wagons were originally delivered with a single top-hung side door on each side, but these proved inefficient, and all were eventually converted to side hung double doors. By 1907, most had been fitted with tarpaulin rails. The goods vans used the same underframe, and were fitted with double sliding doors on each side. Goods-only trains were rare, and the usual practice was to attach goods wagons to scheduled passenger services. Shunting wagons at intermediate stations added to the journey time.

The bogie open doors were also originally top-hung, but converted by the railway at Pilton.

Wagon No. 19 was originally used by the contractors. After the railway opened, it was modified and entered revenue service in 1900. At only 6 long tons (6.1 t; 6.7 short tons) it was used often in preference to an 8-long-ton (8.1 t; 9.0-short-ton) wagon as it reduced the overall weight of a train.

Van 23 was built at Pilton by the L&B. Unlike all other L&B stock, its underframe was entirely made of wood. The van has been restored to service, but has a steel underframe clad in wood.

The Southern Railway introduced several new items of goods stock, and also purchased two ex-War Department travelling cranes for the line. The travelling cranes were ex-WD stock, and fitted with outriggers, rated at 3 long tons (3.05 t; 3.36 short tons) with a fifteen-foot (4.57 m) radius, 4.5 long tons (4.6 t; 5.0 short tons) at 11 ft 6 in (3.51 m). Intended as recovery cranes in the event of a derailment, neither saw much use. One crane, with its match truck, was kept in the long headshunt at Pilton, the other was put to use in Lynton goods yard.

The 1927 bogie goods vans were originally fitted with heavy diagonal wooden cross braces at each end, but these were later replaced with single diagonal angle-iron braces.

=== Liveries ===
One of the most distinctive aspects of the L&B was the livery of its rolling stock. The locomotives originally had a livery of plain-lined holly green, later on a black base, with chestnut under-frames. The passenger carriages were painted terracotta with off-white upper panels, and the goods wagons were light grey. The schemes were simplified as individual vehicles were repainted. With the take over by the Southern and arrival of Lew, the livery was slowly changed to Maunsell Green for locos and passenger stock, and umber for the goods wagons. The loco headlamps which had been black under the L&B were re-painted red.

== Present ==
Much of the line's civil engineering is still in place. Chelfham Viaduct was fully restored in 2000, its eight 42-foot (13 m) wide arches reach 70 feet (21 m) above the Stoke Rivers valley. It is the largest narrow-gauge railway structure in England.

The station at Lynton is now private residences. Blackmoor Gate station is a restaurant and that of Barnstaple Town a school. Chelfham and Woody Bay both serve the new L&B. Chelfham station is currently being restored, and open to visitors every weekend, while Woody Bay is the main centre of operations. Snapper Halt was purchased in 2010 and Bratton Fleming in 2020 by Exmoor Associates – a private company dedicated to securing trackbed for the restoration of the railway.

A short section of the line reopened to passengers in 2004. Bridge 67 was generously rebuilt as a gift by Edmund Nuttall Ltd. – a firm descended from James Nuttall of Manchester, the main contractors for the original construction – allowing an extension to Killington Lane in 2006.

Work is progressing on the next section to be restored, towards Parracombe, Blackmoor and a new temporary southern terminus at Wistlandpound Reservoir. A total of 7 planning applications were submitted to Exmoor National Park Authority and North Devon Council in February 2016, with approvals granted by March 2018. Restoration of Bridges 54 and 55 was completed in December 2019.

Construction of a shelter for a rake of 4 heritage carriages was completed in January 2026. This is located at the west end of Woody Bay station and keeps the worst of the Exmoor weather off of the passenger vehicles.

In November 2015 the Lynton & Barnstaple signed a twinning agreement with the Walhalla Goldfields Railway in Victoria, Australia. This agreement came about due to the similar nature of the railways and to foster cooperation and volunteer exchanges. Like the L&B, the Moe-Walhalla railway was closed over 70 years ago and the work of restoration requires rebuilding the track bed and railway infrastructure.

=== Restoration ===
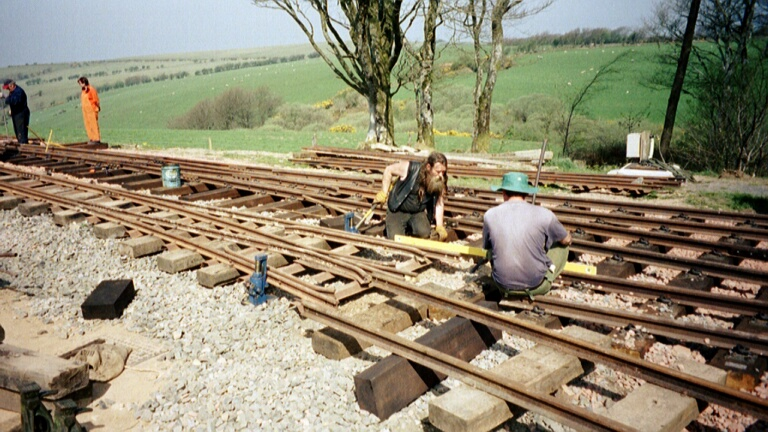
Laying track, Woody Bay, 2003

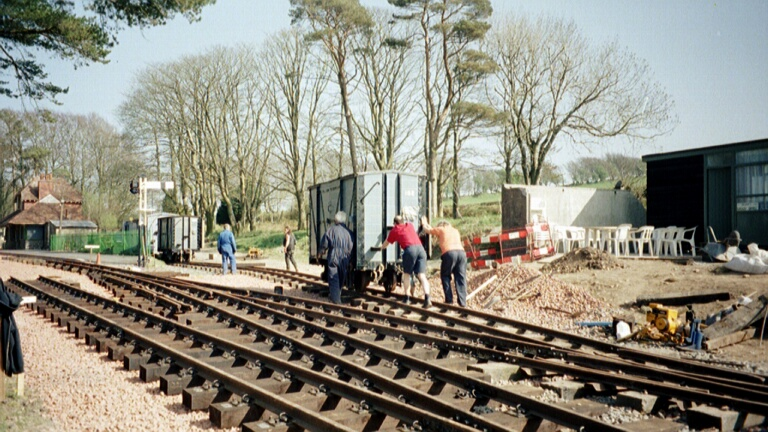
Hand shunting, Woody Bay, 2003

Unlike the Welsh Highland Railway, the track bed was sold off piecemeal – often reverting to the original owners, paying much less than they had sold it for originally. Although there has been minor development on parts of the route, and Wistlandpound Reservoir has flooded the track bed close to its midpoint, much is still in open countryside, with many sections identifiable.

The Lynton & Barnstaple Railway Association (since 2000, a charitable trust) was formed in 1979. Woody Bay Station was purchased by the Lynton and Barnstaple Railway Company in 1995 and, after much effort, a short section of railway reopened to passengers in 2004. This was extended to over a mile in 2006, with steam and diesel-hauled trains running between Woody Bay and the new, temporary terminus at Killington Lane.

In 1995, the Lynbarn Railway – at the Milky Way, a theme park near Clovelly, was created and operated by L&B volunteers. Profits from this funded the purchase, restoration and reopening of Woody Bay. The Lynbarn was handed over to the park in 2005, once Woody Bay had become established, and continues to operate as part of the attraction.

Little original rolling stock survives, but as well as the heritage coaches mentioned below, the largely restored Van 23 was on display at Woody Bay until being removed to the L&B restoration team in Essex in November 2013, for refurbishment and the fitting of brakes, underframe and couplers. The remains of several other coaches and Goods Van 4 are in storage awaiting reconstruction.

Coach 2, used as a summer house, is on display (unrestored) at the National Railway Museum York along with the nameplates of the original locomotives. Coach 15, recovered from Snapper Halt in 1959 and restored by the Ffestiniog Railway in North Wales, has been running there (now as FR Coach 14) for longer than it did on the L&B. Due to the Ffestiniog's smaller loading gauge, the roof profile was altered so it can pass through Garnedd tunnel. In September 2010, Coach 15 visited the L&B with the Lew replica loco, Lyd.

The 1915 Kerr Stuart "Joffre" class 0-6-0T loco 2451 was bought from Gloddfa Ganol in 1983, and named Axe. Restored to working order in 2008, Axe worked most passenger trains at Woody Bay until December 2013. An 0-4-0WT Maffei named Sid, owned by several L&B members, was also used on the L&B steam service until the end of 2013, when it was sold off to a railway museum line in Sweden. To replace "Sid", another privately owned loco, "Isaac" – a Bagnall 0-4-2T, No. 3023, built in 1953 for use in a South African Platinum mine – arrived at Woody Bay from Boston Lodge in December 2013, principally for use hauling the restored original L&B heritage coaches. Isaac departed the railway in 2021 and now resides at the Statfold Barn Railway. In 2014, Bagnall 4-4-0T No. 2819 Charles Wytock arrived at the railway, entering service in 2015. In 2019, it was bought by a consortium of members and, following overhaul, returned to service in 2024 with a new boiler and new name, Sir George Newnes. Sir George Newnes and Lyn (see below) currently (as of 2026) haul most passenger services on the line.

In 2026, 0-4-0T+T locomotive No. 9 Jean was donated to the railway. It previously resided at the Gartell Light Railway in Somerset.

The Trust owns three industrial diesel locomotives, one of which Pilton, can be used as backup for the steam locomotives with the other two, Heddon Hall and D6652, being used for shunting and maintenance trains.

A number of other visiting diesel and steam locomotives have also seen service on the line.

==== Heritage coaches ====
Sixteen coaches were originally built for the L&B in 1898, and another was built by the railway in 1911. Although most were broken up when the railway closed, several parts have survived, and have been retrieved and stored by the railway preservationists.

Following a ten-year restoration, Coaches 7 and 17 returned to Woody Bay on 15 April 2013, to re-enter passenger-carrying service on 10 May 2013 after an absence of 78 years. Coach 16 followed in September 2013, and Coach 11 returned in April 2015. Coach 5 returned to service after restoration in August 2019, with Coach 9 the next to be restored. The initial rake of three heritage coaches, after an inaugural service over the Autumn Gala weekend in September 2013, entered regular service – hauled by "Isaac" – for the Santa Specials in December 2014.

==== Modern replicas ====
===== Lyd =====
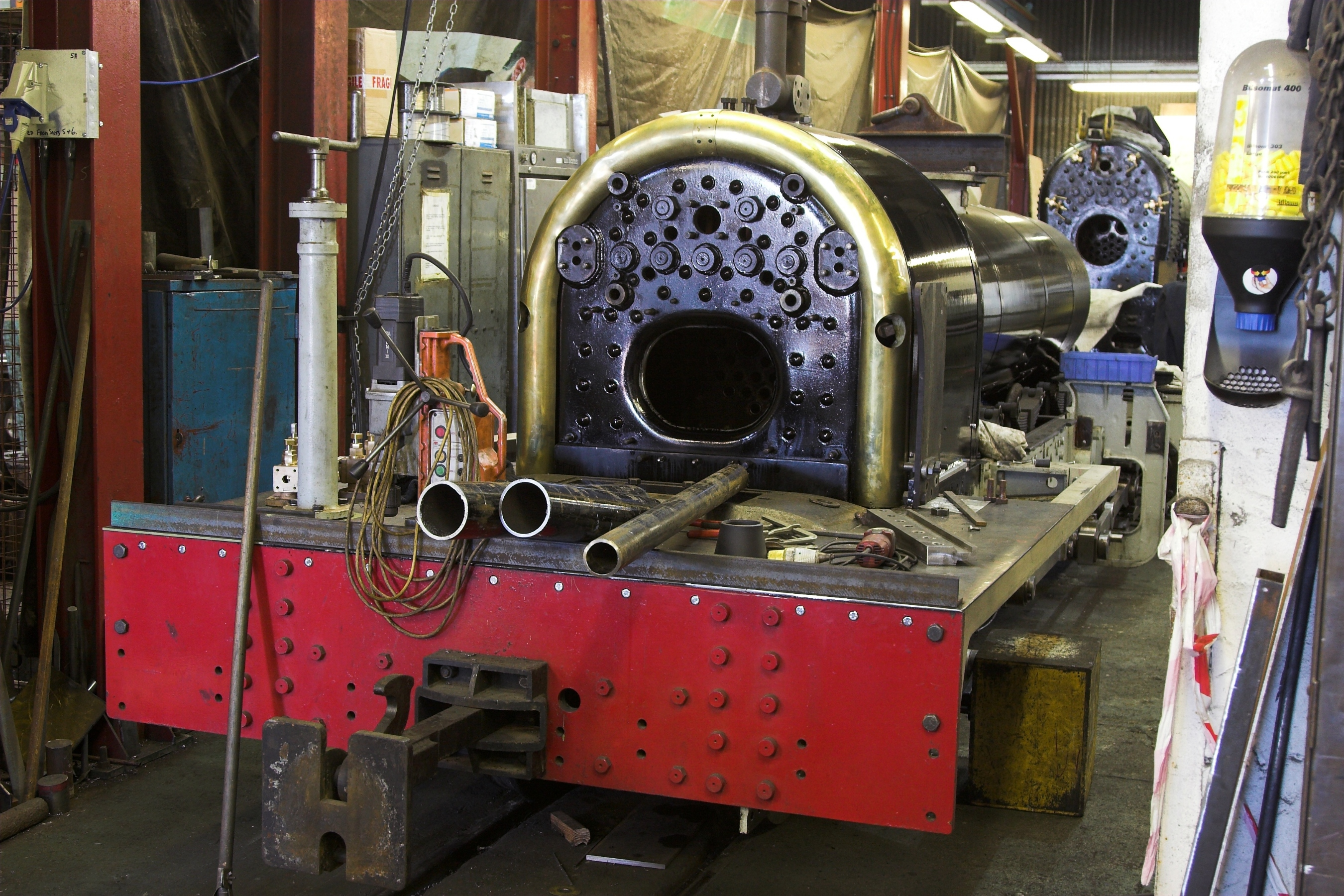
Lyd inside the Ffestiniog Railway's Boston Lodge Workshops, 2009

A Lynton and Barnstaple Manning Wardle type replica, named Lyd, is operational on the Ffestiniog Railway in North Wales.

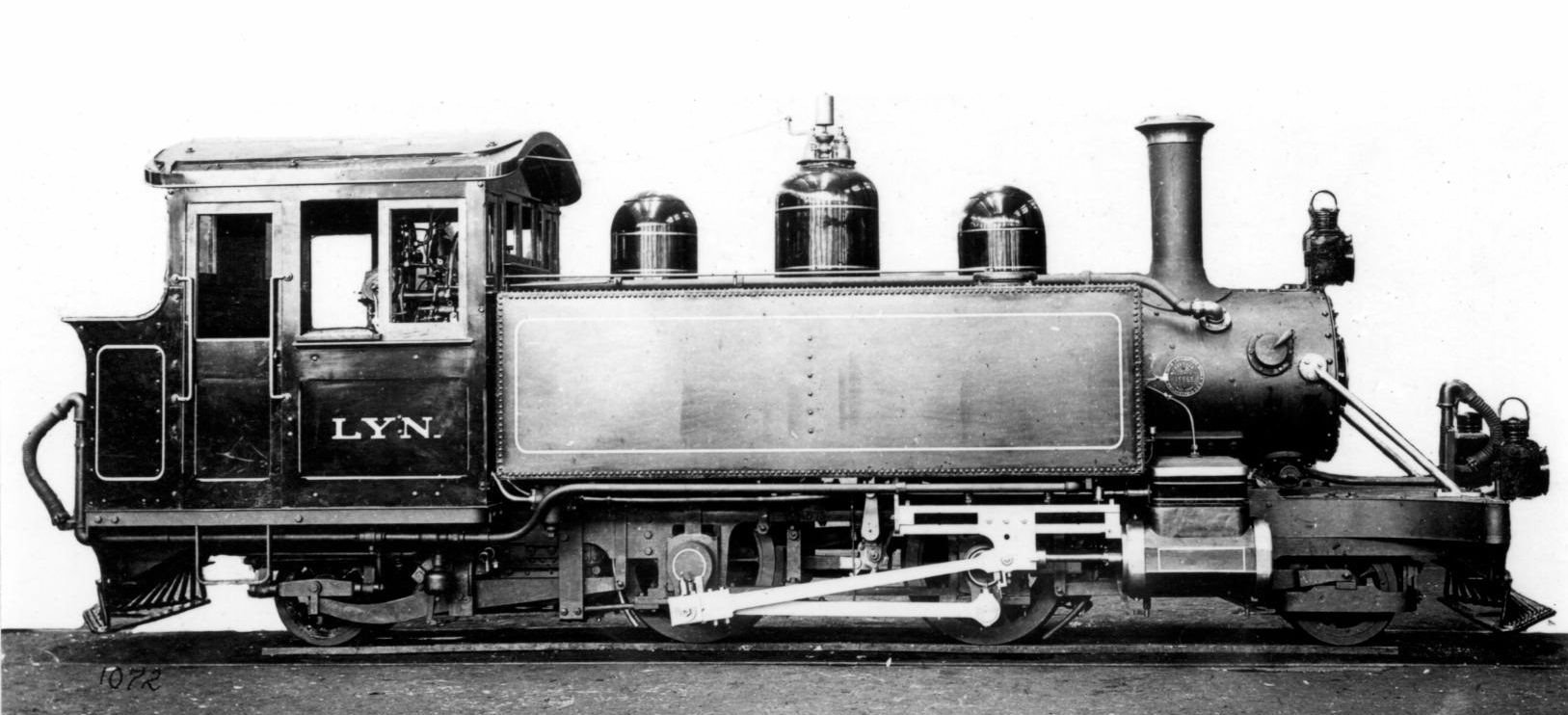
Builder's photo of original Lyn

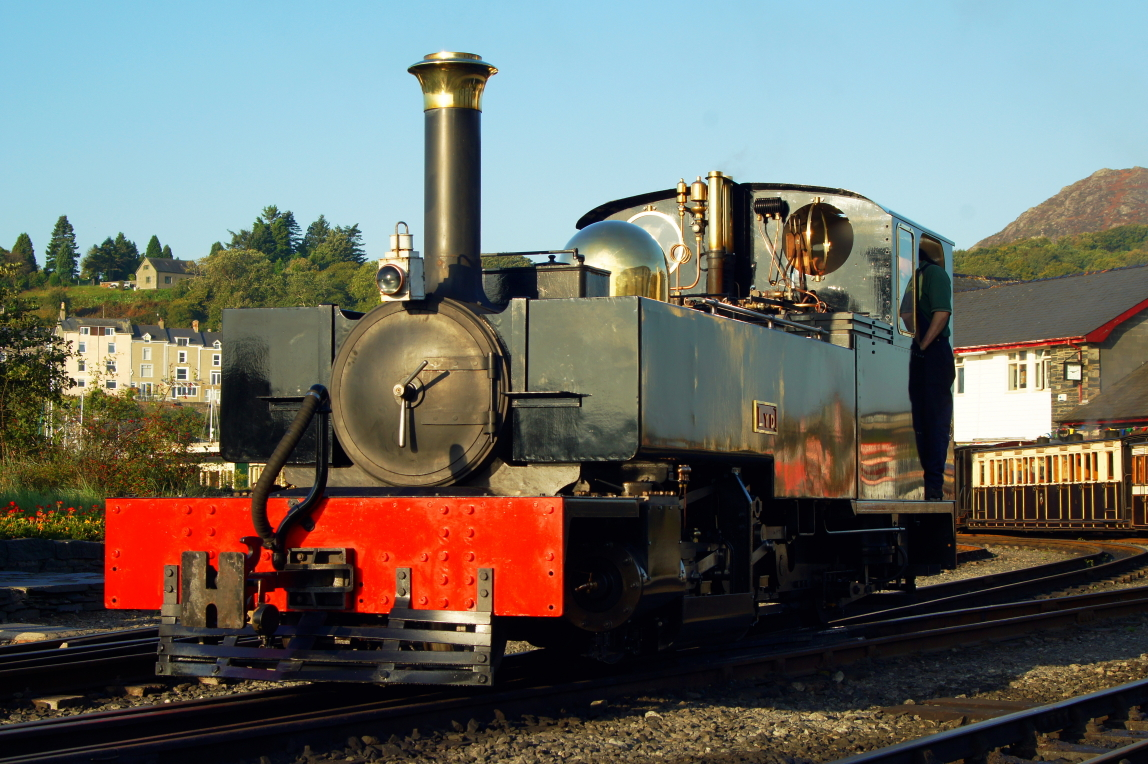
Lyd at Porthmadog Harbour Station

First Steamed in Spring 2010, Lyd visited Woody Bay in September 2010 – to mark the 75th Anniversary of the closure of the L&B. Lyd first moved under its own steam on 5 August 2010 and then underwent running-in trials before visiting the L&B in September 2010 with former L&B coach 15 and Ffestiniog Railway observation car 102.

===== Lyn =====
A modern version of the Baldwin, Lyn – looking externally similar to the 1898 original, but employing several advanced steam technologies, including roller bearings, welded tanks, Lempor exhaust system, and a high-pressure boiler – was completed in 2017. Its first public steaming took place on 8 July 2017 at Alan Keef Ltd. Lyn was delivered to Woody Bay on 11 September 2017, and first ran there on 28 September.

===== Yeo and Exe =====
A set of frames for a new Yeo were built by Winson Engineering in 2000, and these are in storage, awaiting further funds to continue the construction. A new fundraising campaign was launched in 2019 to build replicas of both Yeo and Exe, but it is unclear yet whether the Winson frames can be used for the new Yeo.

== Prospects ==
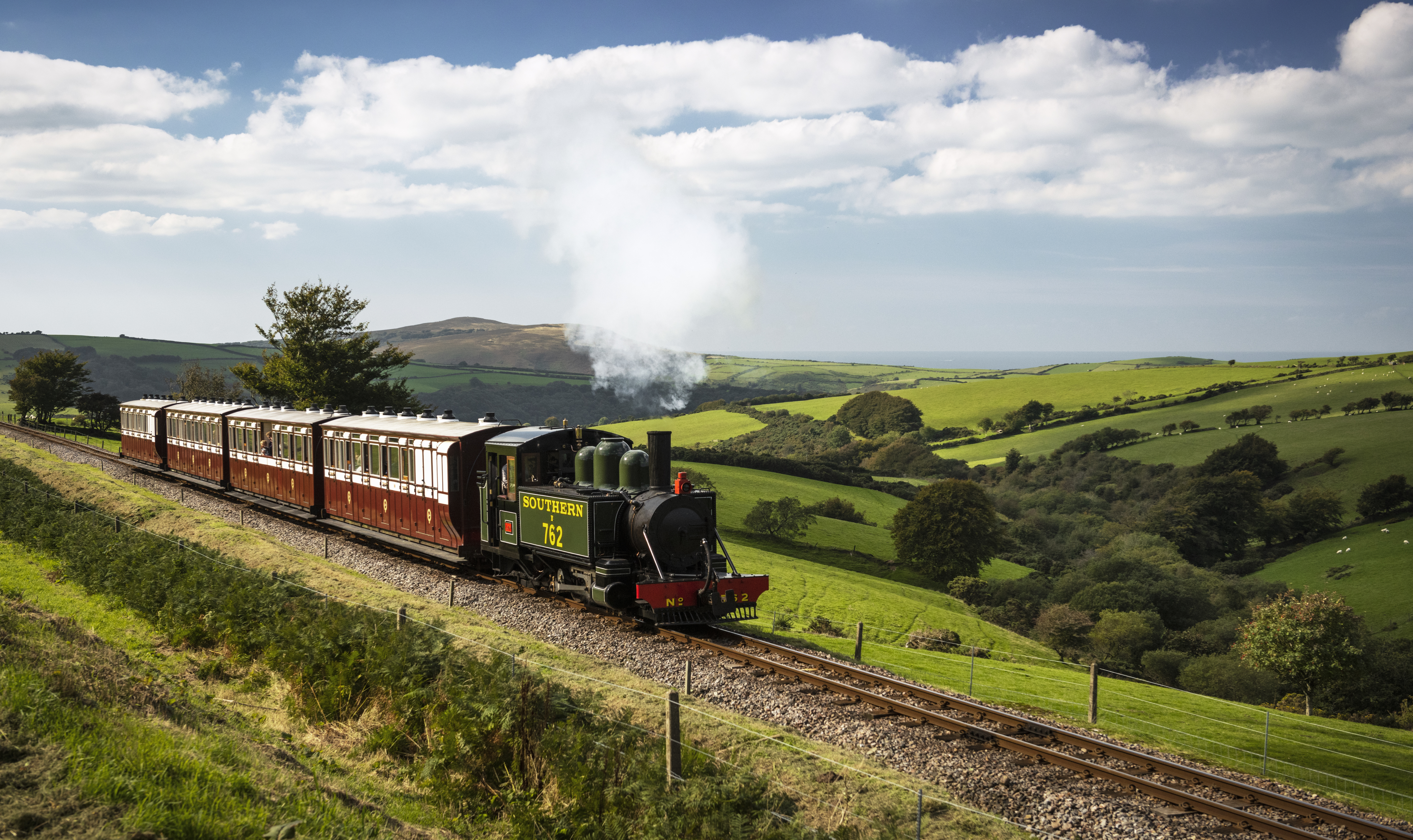
Lyn (2017 replica) with a train near Woody Bay.

Restoring passenger services from Woody Bay was a major undertaking by the volunteers. Although much of the track bed survives intact, several obstacles – including Wistlandpound Reservoir – must be overcome if the greater part of the route is to be restored, fulfilling the hopes expressed in a card left at Barnstaple on the day after the line closed – Perchance it is not dead, but sleepeth...

In October 2007, the railway announced plans for reinstating enough trackbed to reopen 9 miles (14 km) of track, linking the station at Woody Bay to both Lynton (at a new terminus on an extension to the original line, closer to the town) and a new station at Wistlandpound. It was hoped that the extension, codenamed 'Phase 2a', will be complete by 2026. However, as of September 2025, no work has been undertaken.

Exmoor Enterprise, the working group leading the project, estimated that the full project being considered was likely to cost around £30 million, including the building of replica rolling stock, reconstructing original coaches and Van 4, as well as improving the line as an important local tourist attraction. The railway's management predicts the scheme will generate over £70 million for the south west economy within five years.

Working closely with international engineering and design consultants Arup, The L&B Trust held a series of public consultations during May and June 2012, providing information to local communities about plans for obtaining a TWO, and the next phase of the reinstatement, south-west from Killington Lane to Blackmoor, then Wistlandpound, and north-east to Caffyns, and eventually to Lynton.

Longer-term plans foresee the reopening of the line towards Barnstaple.

== See also ==
- British narrow gauge railways
- Rolling stock of the Lynton and Barnstaple Railway
- Lynton & Barnstaple Railway Trust
- Lynton and Barnstaple Railway Company Limited
- Other local railway attractions
  - Bideford and Instow Railway
  - Lynton and Lynmouth Cliff Railway
  - West Somerset Railway
