= Bristol Wagon & Carriage Works =

Bristol Wagon and Carriage Works Co
- Founded: 23 November 1866 in Bristol, England

The Bristol Wagon & Carriage Works was a manufacturer of railway carriages and wagons, agricultural machinery and stationary engines, based in Bristol.

== History ==
In 1851, Albert Fry and John Fowler acquired Stratton & Hughes, a coachbuilding firm. In 1855, Fowler moved to Leeds to establish his own manufacturing company. Albert's brother Thomas joined the firm, which traded as A&T Fry until 1866, when Thomas was elected as an MP.

Albert Fry renamed the company the Bristol Wagon and Carriage Works Ltd in 1866 and the company moved to a new factory on 13 acres at Lawrence Hill. The factory had extensive engineering facilities including foundries for iron and brass, carpentry and coach painting, and supplied rolling stock to railways around the world. By 1883, the company's Lawrence Hill works employed over 900 people. Dr William Gordon Stables commissioned his custom-built "Gentleman's caravan", a portable horse drawn home called "The Wanderer" modelled on gipsy caravans he had seen in his youth, considered the first ever leisure caravan in which he travelled around Great Britain in 1885.

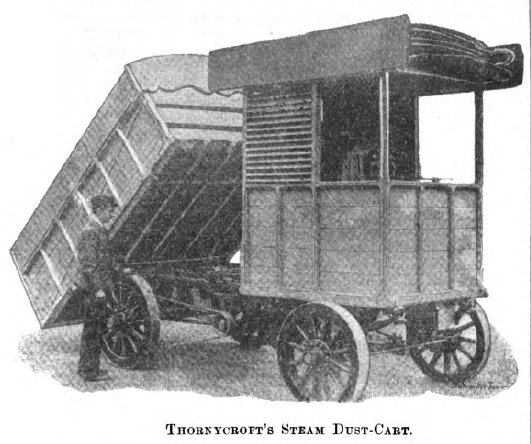
Thornycroft Steam Wagon of 1897 built by Bristol Carriage & Wagon Works

With the repeal of the restrictive Red flag traffic laws in the UK in 1896, new opportunities arose in commercial road transport, and the works became involved in building the Thornycroft steam wagon, with their steam tipper wagon being described as built by the Bristol Wagon and Carriage Company but engined by Thornycroft, leaving it unclear which party made the chassis.

In 1905 the company filed a patent for a 4½ hp. petrol agricultural stationary engine and the first engine was exhibited at the Smithfield Show in 1906. The manufacture of internal combustion engines became an increasing focus for the company.

In 1915 Falconar Fry became a joint managing director of the company. Growing competition from R. A. Lister and other engine manufacturers caused the company's financial position to weaken. The agricultural sales part of the business was sold to Mr. A. M. Wilmot, and the remainder of the company was acquired by the Leeds Forge Company in 1920 and railway-related manufacturing was moved to their factory in Leeds. Leeds Forge was itself acquired by the Metropolitan Railway Carriage and Wagon Company, which subsequently became the Metro Cammell engineering company.

The factory site and properties were sold by auction to the Bristol Tramways and Carriage Co. on 24 July 1924.

== Railways supplied ==
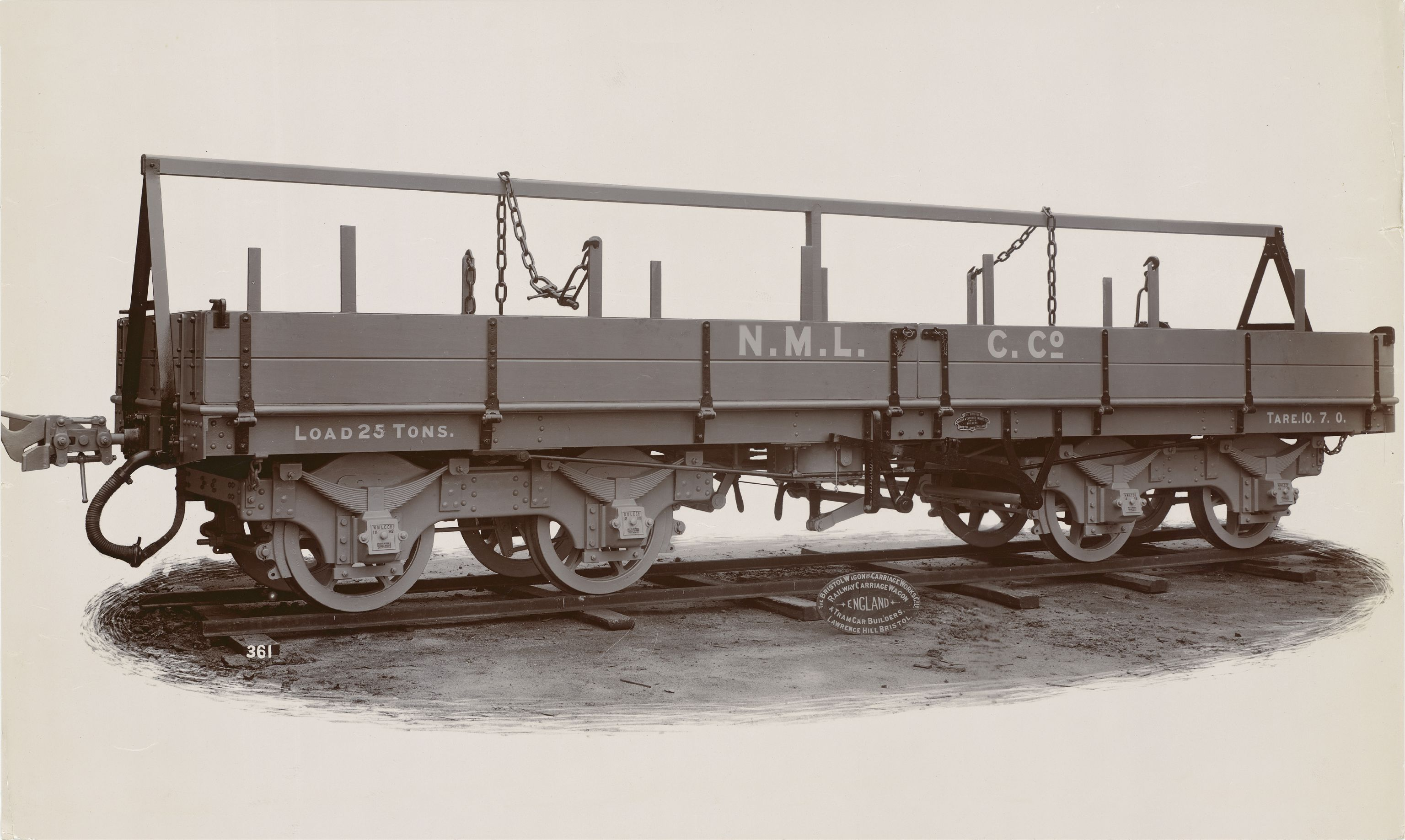
Wagon for North Mount Lyell Copper Company, built 1898

The Bristol Wagon & Carriage Works supplied carriages to a number of notable railways around the world, including the Exeter Tramways in 1892, the City and South London Railway in 1894, the Ffestiniog Railway in 1896 (indirectly - removed from Lynton and Barnstaple post FR revival), the Tralee and Dingle Light Railway and the Lynton and Barnstaple Railway in 1897.
