= Lew (locomotive) =

Southern Railway E188 Lew
Type and origin
- Power type: Steam
- Builder: Manning Wardle, Leeds
- Serial number: 2042
- Build date: 1925
Specifications
- Configuration
  - Whyte: 2-6-2T
- Gauge: 1 ft 11 1/2 in (597 mm)
- Leading dia.: 2 ft 0 in (0.610 m)
- Driver dia.: 2 ft 9 in (0.838 m)
- Trailing dia.: 2 ft 0 in (0.610 m)
- Wheelbase: Coupled: 6 ft 6 in (1.981 m); Total: 17 ft 9 in (5.410 m)
- Length: 22 ft 4 in (6.81 m) over buffer beams
- Width: 6 ft 7 in (2.01 m)
- Height: 8 ft 11 in (2.72 m)
- Loco weight: 27.25 long tons (27.69 t; 30.52 short tons)
- Fuel type: Coal
- Firebox
  - Grate area: 8.85 sq ft (0.822 m^{2})
- Heating surface: 383 sq ft (35.58 m^{2})
- Cylinders: Two, outside
- Cylinder size: 10.5 in × 16 in (267 mm × 406 mm)
- Valve gear: Joy
Career
- Operators: Southern Railway
- Numbers: E188
- Locale: Devon, South West England
- Withdrawn: November 1935
- Disposition: Sold overseas, final destination and fate unknown

Lew was a Manning Wardle 2-6-2T built in 1925 for the narrow gauge Lynton and Barnstaple Railway.

== History ==
Lew, following L&B tradition, was named after one of the local rivers with a three-letter name, the River Lew.

Lew was built to the same design as the previous L&B Manning Wardle locomotives, but with a redesigned cab to eliminate a smoke trap and give more room to the crew. After the railway closed, the remaining L&B equipment was sold at auction in November 1935. The nameplates, along with the nameplates of the other locomotives, were removed and donated to York Railway Museum (the predecessor of the National Railway Museum). Lew was purchased to work the trains dismantling the railway, and was used for this purpose until late summer 1936.

In September 1936, Lew was photographed with the words "A.L.C. Pernambuco Lot 1 Kilos 22353" painted on the front of its tank, believed to refer to the purchaser, a plantation in Brazil. On 28 September 1936, Lew sailed from Swansea, on the SS Sabor. Sabor arrived in Pernambuco on 15 October 1936. Sabor left Pernambuco on 17 October, called at Bahia on 20 October, and arrived in Rio de Janeiro on 23 October.

== Lyd ==
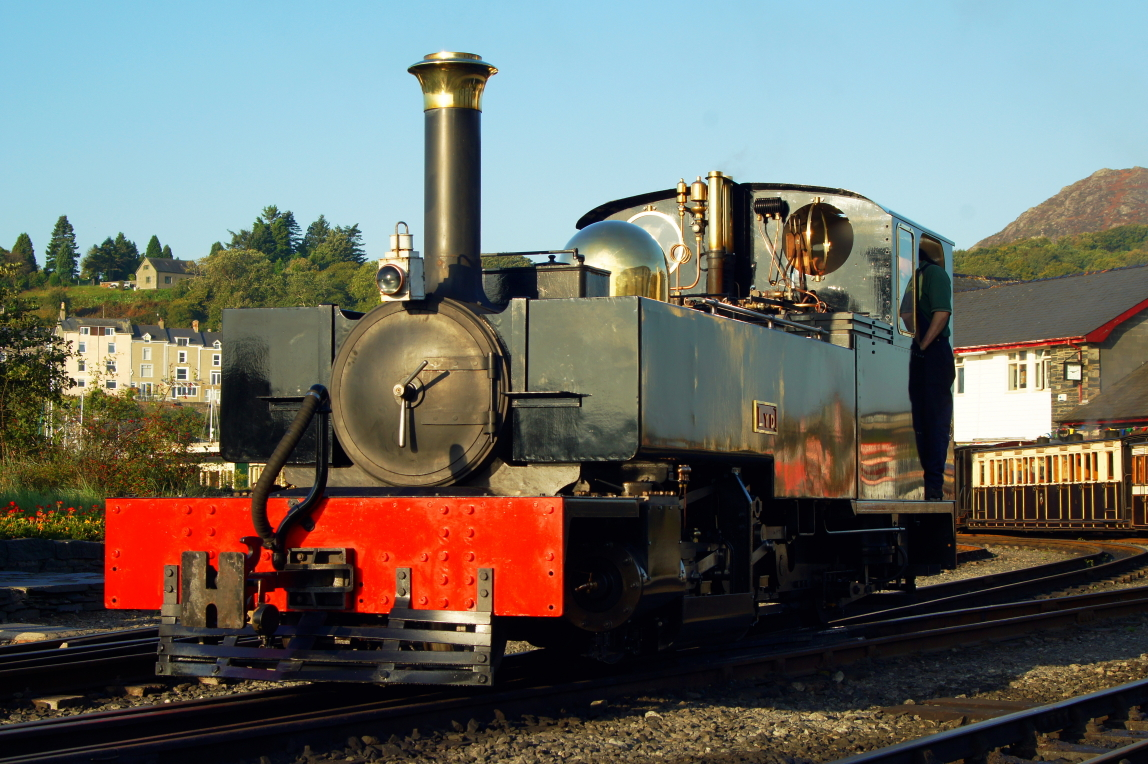
Lyd at Porthmadog Harbour Station

A replica of Lew, named Lyd in accordance with the L&B tradition of naming its locos after local three-letter rivers, was completed at Boston Lodge on the Ffestiniog and Welsh Highland Railway in August 2010.
