= Lyn (locomotive) =

Lynton & Barnstaple Railway Lyn
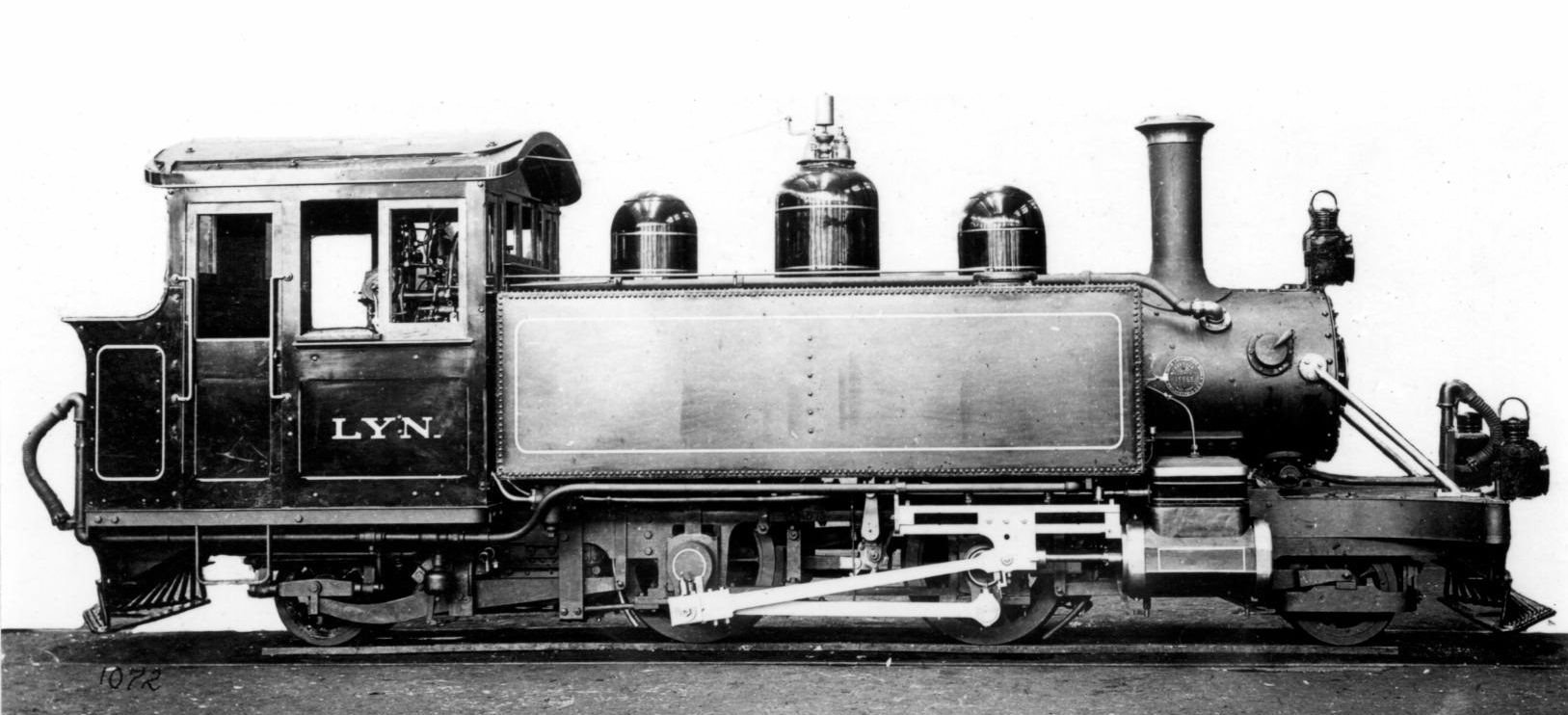
- Official builder's photo of Lyn, 1898
Type and origin
- Power type: Steam
- Builder: Baldwin Locomotive Works
- Serial number: 15965
- Model: 8-14 1/4 C
- Build date: May 1898
Specifications
- Configuration
  - Whyte: 2-4-2T
  - UIC: 1′B1′ n2t
- Gauge: 1 ft 11 1/2 in (597 mm)
- Leading dia.: 1 ft 10 in (0.559 m)
- Driver dia.: 2 ft 9 in (0.838 m)
- Trailing dia.: 1 ft 10 in (0.559 m)
- Wheelbase: Coupled: 5 ft 0 in (1.52 m); Overall: 17 ft 7 in (5.36 m)
- Length: 23 ft 6 in (7.16 m) over headstocks
- Width: 7 ft 2 in (2.18 m)
- Height: 8 ft 11 in (2.72 m)
- Frame type: Bar frame, outside
- Loco weight: 22 long tons (22 t; 25 short tons)
- Fuel type: Coal
- Firebox
  - Grate area: 7.7 sq ft (0.72 m^{2})
- Boiler pressure: 180 psi (1.24 MPa)
- Heating surface: 379.2 sq ft (35.23 m^{2})
- Cylinders: Two, outside
- Cylinder size: 10 in × 16 in (254 mm × 406 mm)
- Valve gear: Stephenson
Career
- Operators: Lynton and Barnstaple Railway; Southern Railway
- Numbers: L&B: Lyn; SR: E762
- Nicknames: The Yankee
- Locale: Devon, South West England
- Last run: September 1935
- Scrapped: December 1935
- Disposition: Scrapped; New-build completed 2017

Lyn was a 2-4-2T steam locomotive built by the Baldwin Locomotive Works in 1898 for the Lynton and Barnstaple Railway in England. While the original Lyn was scrapped in 1935, a complete recreation of the locomotive exists, having been completed in 2017, and bears the same name as its precursor.

== History ==
Between July 1897 and January 1898, employees of many British engineering companies were striking in an attempt to win the right to an eight-hour working day, leaving locomotive builders with large backlogs of unfulfilled orders. The Lynton and Barnstaple consulted the US-based Baldwin to produce the engine they needed. A typical American engine with bar frames, multiple domes and impressive headlamps, the loco was erected in Philadelphia, then disassembled and shipped to Barnstaple. It was reassembled by L&B staff in their Pilton workshops.

Lyn, like all the locomotives on the L&B, was named after a local river with a three-letter name, the River Lyn.

In 1907 Lyn's boiler was condemned when the inspector's hammer accidentally penetrated one of the plates, and a replacement boiler was built at Avonside. After the Lynton and Barnstaple became part of the Southern Railway in 1923, Lyn was taken to Eastleigh Works for a major overhaul in 1928, returning the following year in Southern Green Livery and carrying the number E762 on the side tanks, as well as the original nameplates on the cab sides.

Lyn was scrapped in 1935, after the line closed.

== Modern replacement ==
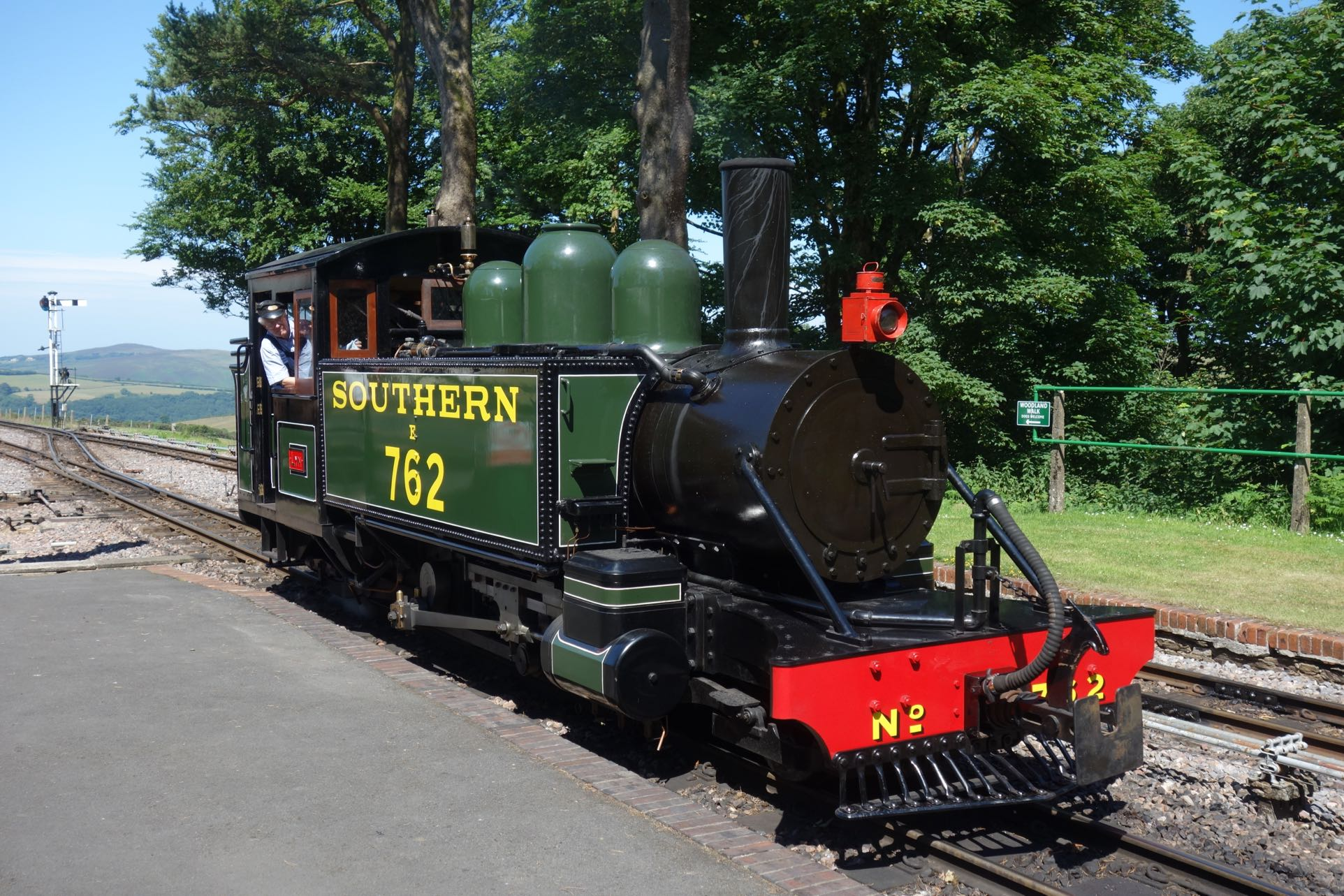
Replica locomotive Lyn on the Lynton & Barnstaple Railway at Woody Bay station

In January 2009, The Lynton & Barnstaple Railway Trust announced a project to build an advanced modern replacement Lyn for use on the restored railway by 2012. By 2013, Lyn's wooden cab had been built, along with the boiler and most fittings, wheels, cylinders and many other components. CAD and modern engineering techniques were employed to ensure that, while the finished locomotive remains true to the original in appearance, it will perform much more efficiently and be easier to maintain and operate. Final assembly was carried out by Alan Keef Ltd. who has had experience with other Baldwin locos, such as the restoration of Baldwin 794 for the Welsh Highland Heritage Railway. First steamed on 8 July 2017, Lyn is finished in the colours and configuration of the original Lyn after returning from overhaul in 1929. The locomotive had its public debut at the L&B's September 2017 gala and is now resident at Woody Bay railway station.

== See also ==
- Victorian Railways NA class Slightly larger locos of the same era, and similar design.
- Steam locomotives of the 21st century
