= David Curwen =

English miniature railway steam locomotive mechanical engineer

David C. Curwen (30 November 1913 – 26 May 2011) was an English miniature railway steam locomotive mechanical engineer.

Born in Sydenham, South London, and educated at King's School, Canterbury, Curwen worked from 1935 to 1945 for Short Brothers in Rochester as an aircraft engineer.

In 1946, he established his own engineering firm, Baydon. In 1950 he married Barbara Willans, an actress. In 1951 he became Chief Mechanical Engineer (CME) of the Talyllyn Railway in Wales for its first year of preservation.

At the end of the 1951 season, he returned to Devizes, Wiltshire where he went into partnership with A.E. Newbery to create Curwen and Newbery. He left the partnership in 1966 and established his own workshop at All Cannings, Wiltshire.

He published his autobiography titled Rule of Thumb in 2006, and a review of his work was published as The Miniature Locomotives of David Curwen in 2008, by Dave Holdroyd.

== Locomotives ==
Locomotives built by Curwen include the following:

- William Bell, a 10 1/4 in (260 mm) gauge 4-6-2 built in 1946/47 for the Hilsea Miniature Railway on Portsea Island
- Robin Hood, a 10 1/4 in (260 mm) gauge 4-6-2 built in 1946/47 for the Weymouth Miniature Railway that ran adjacent to Radipole Lake
- Waverley, a 10 1/4 in (260 mm) gauge 4-4-2 built in 1948. It was originally named Black Prince and used on a railway in Weymouth, Dorset. It was later in use at the Isle of Mull Railway, and is now based at Rudyard Lake Steam Railway, in Staffordshire.
- John H Gretton, another 10 1/4 in (260 mm) gauge 4-4-2 built in 1948, based at the Stapleford Miniature Railway in Leicestershire, rebuilt in 1969.
- Isambard Kingdom Brunel, a 10 1/4 in (260 mm) gauge 2-6-0 built in 1977 for the Age of Steam in Penzance where it ran on the Crowlas Woodland Railway. This locomotive now resides on Royal Victoria Railway in Southampton where there is a new-build twin locomotive named Sammy The Sergeant.
- No. 5, nicknamed The Lawnmower, a 2 ft 3 in (686 mm) gauge lightweight locomotive built in 1952 for the Talyllyn Railway using a Model T Ford engine, transmission from the narrowboat of L.T.C. Rolt and the wheels from a slate wagon. It worked the Fridays-only winter passenger service until 1953, when it was taken out of use with a failed gearbox. It was dismantled in 1954, and converted into a flat wagon. It was proposed to rebuild it as a memorial to Curwen, using a replacement engine and bodywork.

== Source ==
- The Miniature Locomotives of David Curwen, 2008 by Lawson Little and Dave Holdroyd
