= Killington Lane railway station =

Narrow gauge railway station in the UK

Coordinates: 51.19608°N 3.90427°W

Killington Lane is a temporary terminus about one mile (1.6 km) southwest of Woody Bay on the Lynton and Barnstaple Railway (L&B), the narrow gauge line that originally ran for 19 miles (31 km) through Exmoor from Barnstaple to Lynton and Lynmouth in North Devon.

== History ==
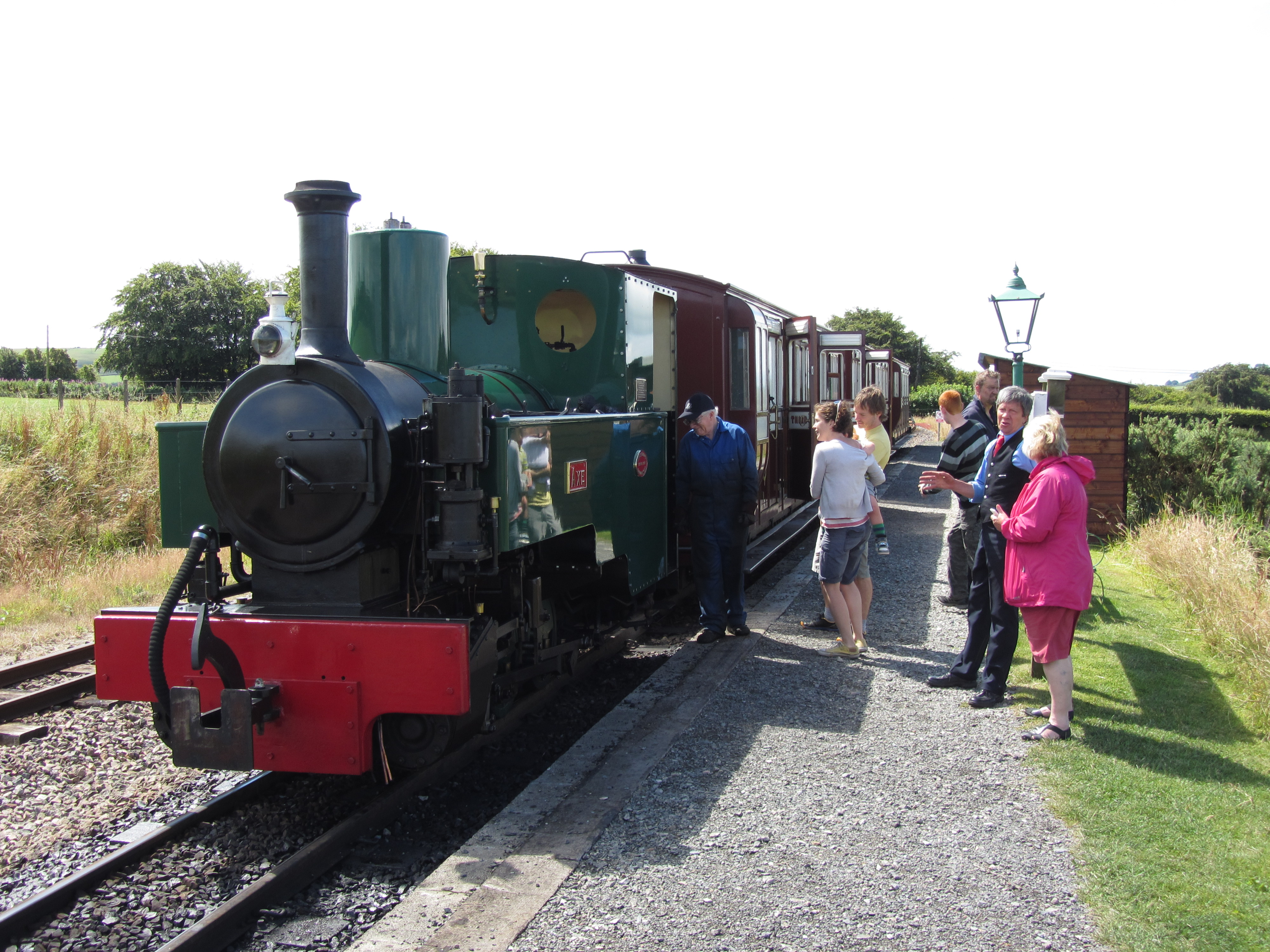
Kerr, Stuart AXE with train at Killington Lane (2014)

The L&B originally opened in 1898, and closed in 1935.

Killington Lane opened to passenger services on 27 May 2006, as the rebuilding continues southwards towards the former Halt at Parracombe.

The station has been built alongside rather than actually on the original formation. The adjacent cutting is partially filled in leading to Bridge 65, which, once rebuilt, would allow the line to be rebuilt under and beyond Killington Lane.

During 2013, with the introduction of three restored L&B heritage carriages, each 35 feet (11 m) long, and with a fourth being restored for delivery during 2014, the platform and run-round loop were extended to cater for larger trains.

== Design ==
The wooden platform shelter, similar in footprint to those used elsewhere on the original line (such as at Snapper) is, like the carriage shed at Woody Bay, intended to be transportable, so the station can be moved to each new railhead as the reconstruction continues. Destroyed by a storm early in 2014, which resulted in it being deposited in a field 100 yards (90 m) away, the shelter was replaced by a new building in April 2014, this time held in place by four internal posts made from lengths of redundant rail sunk into the platform.

== Location ==
Killington Lane station is at: grid reference SS67044582

Preceding station	Heritage railways	Following station
Terminus	Lynton and Barnstaple Railway (2006 -)	Woody Bay
