= Wringcliff Bay =

Bay in Devon, England

Coordinates: 51°13′52″N 3°51′39″W

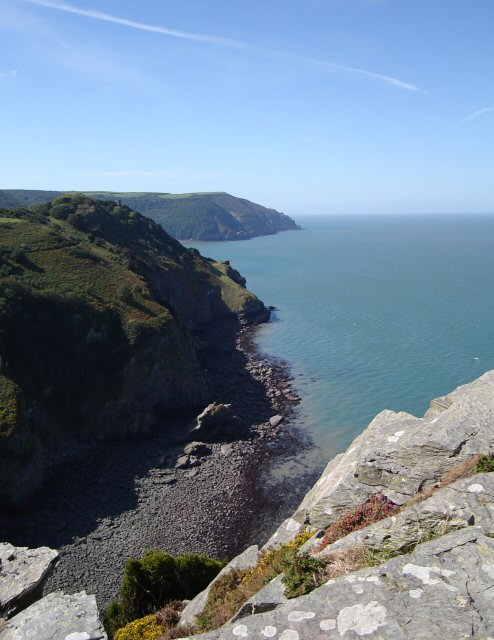
Wringcliff Bay

Wringcliff Bay, also known as Wring Cliff Cove, is a bay on the Bristol Channel of northern Devon, England. It lies to the northwest of the village of Lynton, to the northeast of Lee Bay in a "basket-shaped hollow" below the Valley of Rocks. Duty Point and Crock Point are nearby. A narrow path leads down from the South West Coast Path to the sand and shingle, and also leads to Lee Abbey to the west. The bay is mentioned as "an isolated spot" in Hazel Holt's novel, Gone Away (2010).
