= Parracombe railway station =

Narrow gauge railway station in the UK

Coordinates: 51.18853°N 3.89852°W

Parracombe Halt

General information
- Location: Exmoor, North Devon; England
- Grid reference: SS67424497
- Platforms: 1

Other information
- Status: Disused

History
- Original company: Lynton & Barnstaple
- Post-grouping: Southern

Key dates
- 1 May 1899: Opened
- 30 September 1935: Closed
Location

Parracombe railway station was a halt on the Lynton & Barnstaple Railway, a narrow gauge line that ran through Exmoor from Barnstaple to Lynton and Lynmouth in North Devon, England. The Halt which served the village of Parracombe comprised a simple wooden shelter and was not opened until 1 May 1899 — almost a year after the line was opened on 16 May 1898 — and closed along with the rest of the railway on 30 September 1935. It is planned this station will be reopened next by the Lynton & Barnstaple Trust. It will replace the station at Killington Lane a bit further to the north that was opened in 2006.

== History ==
The village of Parracombe was the second largest intermediate settlement along the route of the railway, however its population was less than 400 souls. There was local opposition to the line by one landowner, Mr. Charles Blackmore, of Court Place. However, he was the only detractor. His younger brother Mr Henry Blackmore, the proprietor of the Fox and Goose Hotel was actively supportive. The railway company was so short of money that no station was built here, despite meetings to decide a location for a proposed station. When the Halt opened it appeared in timetables as Parracombe Churchtown. Tickets were dispensed by the local Post Office. Even though it was a halt most trains stopped at Parracombe as there was a good water supply at the station, and the water supply often failed at Lynton and Lynmouth due to the height of the latter station.

From 1923 until closure, the line was operated by the Southern Railway.

The Southern Railway replacement concrete shelter is still evident, although a bungalow and other buildings obscure part of the formation, and infilling of part of the cutting has buried the trackbed since the site was auctioned, along with the rest of the trackbed, in 1938.

== Preservation ==
The station was purchased by the Lynton and Barnstaple Railway Trust in 2021.

| Preceding station | Disused railways | Following station |
|---|---|---|
| Blackmoor | Lynton & Barnstaple Railway (1898-1935) | Woody Bay |
