= Caffyns Halt railway station =

Former railway station in Devon, England

Coordinates: 51.21088°N 3.86193°W

Caffyns Halt

General information
- Location: Exmoor, North Devon; England
- Grid reference: SS70044739
- Platforms: 1

Other information
- Status: Disused

History
- Original company: Lynton and Barnstaple Railway
- Pre-grouping: Lynton and Barnstaple Railway
- Post-grouping: Southern Railway

Key dates
- 1907: Opened
- 30 September 1935: Closed
Location

Caffyns Halt was a halt on the Lynton and Barnstaple Railway, a narrow gauge line that ran through Exmoor, England, from Barnstaple to Lynton and Lynmouth in North Devon. The station primarily served Caffyns Golf Links, as well as the rural area near the hamlet of Dean. It opened in 1907, and closed on 29 September 1935. From 1923 until closure the line was operated by the Southern Railway.

The site, now within the Exmoor National Park, is still visible from the Lynton - Blackmoor Gate road. The isolated arch of a road overbridge is still standing, after an attempt by the landowner to demolish it was blocked by the National Park Authority. The ruined shell of the golf clubhouse remains about 1/2 mile (0.80 km) north of the station.

Preceding station	Disused railways	Following station
Woody Bay	Lynton & Barnstaple Railway (1898-1935)	Lynton & Lynmouth
