= Pilton railway station =

Former railway station in England

Coordinates: 51.08353°N 4.06070°W

Pilton Yard

General information
- Location: Exmoor, North Devon; England
- Grid reference: SS55763360

Other information
- Status: Disused

History
- Original company: Lynton & Barnstaple
- Post-grouping: Southern

Key dates
- November 1898: opened for passengers
- 11 May 1904: Public service withdrawn but retained for staff use only
- 30 September 1935: Closed
Location

Pilton Yard, in Barnstaple was, between 1898 and 1935, the main depot and operating centre of the Lynton and Barnstaple Railway ('L&B'), a narrow gauge line that ran through Exmoor from Barnstaple to Lynton and Lynmouth in north Devon, England. Pilton station was served by regular passenger services advertised between 1898 and 1904 after which only goods facilities were provided. Passengers were catered for at the nearby LSWR station, Barnstaple Town, which provided connections with trains on the standard gauge branch line to Ilfracombe. The L&B's main offices were also based at Pilton, in a building formerly belonging to the Tannery which had earlier occupied the site, and which took over the site after the railway closed.

Pilton was the site of the L&B's only turntable. Locomotives always travelled with their boilers facing "down" the line, i.e. towards Lynton (down as it was away from London by rail, although geologically, Lynton was higher, and geographically nearer to London). The turntable was used to turn rolling stock periodically to even-out bearing wear. After closure, the turntable was installed at the Romney, Hythe & Dymchurch Railway in Kent, but is now owned by the Lynton and Barnstaple Railway Trust and in storage for eventual restoration and reuse on the new L&B.

The carriage sheds, locomotive shed and other remnants of the railway were destroyed in a fire in 1992. Much of the site is now a car park, although there are still signs of its former railway use.

Preceding station	Disused railways	Following station
Barnstaple Town (Change for LSWR)	Lynton & Barnstaple Railway (1898-1935)	Snapper Halt
