= Woody Bay, Devon =

Bay on the North Devon coast of England

Coordinates: 51.227°N 3.892°W

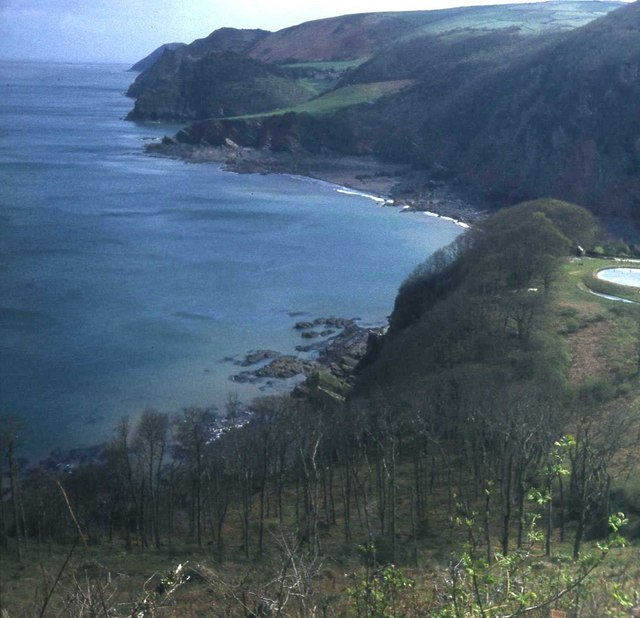
Woody Bay, looking eastward

Woody Bay is a bay on the North Devon coast of England, 3 miles (4.8 km) west of Lynton and 8 miles (13 km) east of Combe Martin with a stony beach. It lies in the civil parish of Martinhoe at the edge of the Exmoor National Park and is a waypoint on the South West Coast Path. There were once plans to develop the area to become a holiday resort.

Access to the remote beach is via a very narrow one mile long steep lane, there is no parking.

Around the headland is Lee Abbey Bay that is on the Lee Abbey Estate. This has an accessible beach with parking.

== History ==
In 1885 the Manor of Martinhoe, including the then-named Wooda Bay, was purchased by Colonel Benjamin Lake, a wealthy solicitor from Orpington in Kent. Perhaps in an effort to emulate Sir George Newnes' efforts in the nearby twin towns of Lynton and Lynmouth, Col. Lake planned to develop the bay as an exclusive resort. He converted Martinhoe Manor House into an Hotel, and in 1894, opened a new golf course at Martinhoe common. Plots of land were sold off, and a number of villas were built on the wooded slopes overlooking the bay. An artificial rock pool was constructed at the east end of the beach, which is visible at low tide.

Col. Lake's plans meant there would be a need to bring in more visitors, by improving communications into the area. New roads were built and in 1895, construction of a pier was started, to provide access from coastal steamers. In 1898, The narrow-gauge Lynton & Barnstaple Railway arrived, with a relatively substantial station built high above the bay. There were also plans (never fulfilled) for a branch line to run down towards the shore.

In January 1897, with the pier almost completed, a major steamship company operating in the area announced that they would be sailing to Woody Bay instead of Lynmouth. This caused considerable alarm among the Lynton and Lynmouth residents, and eventually, the decision was reversed. The official opening of the Woody Bay pier took place on 15 April 1897. However, bad weather and low tides prevented the first ships from docking, and this set the scene for future visitors – the pier was not long enough to cater for landings at low tide. Although there was a regular service from Bristol, fewer steamers were calling than had been intended, and plans were drawn up to extend the pier further out into the bay. A cliff railway was also mooted, like the nearby Lynton and Lynmouth Cliff Railway, to connect with the Lynton & Barnstaple Railway, although neither plan ever came to fruition.

On 12 January 1899, the pier was severely damaged by a storm, with another a year later. It was never repaired, and the remains were finally demolished for scrap in 1902, although some evidence of its existence can still be seen on the shoreline today.

The Colonel continued pouring money into the area, in an effort to see his dream become reality. In July 1900, he was forced into bankruptcy, with debts of over £170,000. He was sentenced to twelve years in prison, for using clients' savings to fund the Woody Bay developments, and died in 1907 along with any prospect of further intensive developments around Martinhoe.

== Present day ==
Woody Bay railway station is the base of the modern Lynton and Barnstaple Railway, a charitable trust which has re-opened some of the original route for steam trains.
