= Blackmoor railway station =

Former railway station in Devon, England

Coordinates: 51.17099°N 3.93728°W

Blackmoor
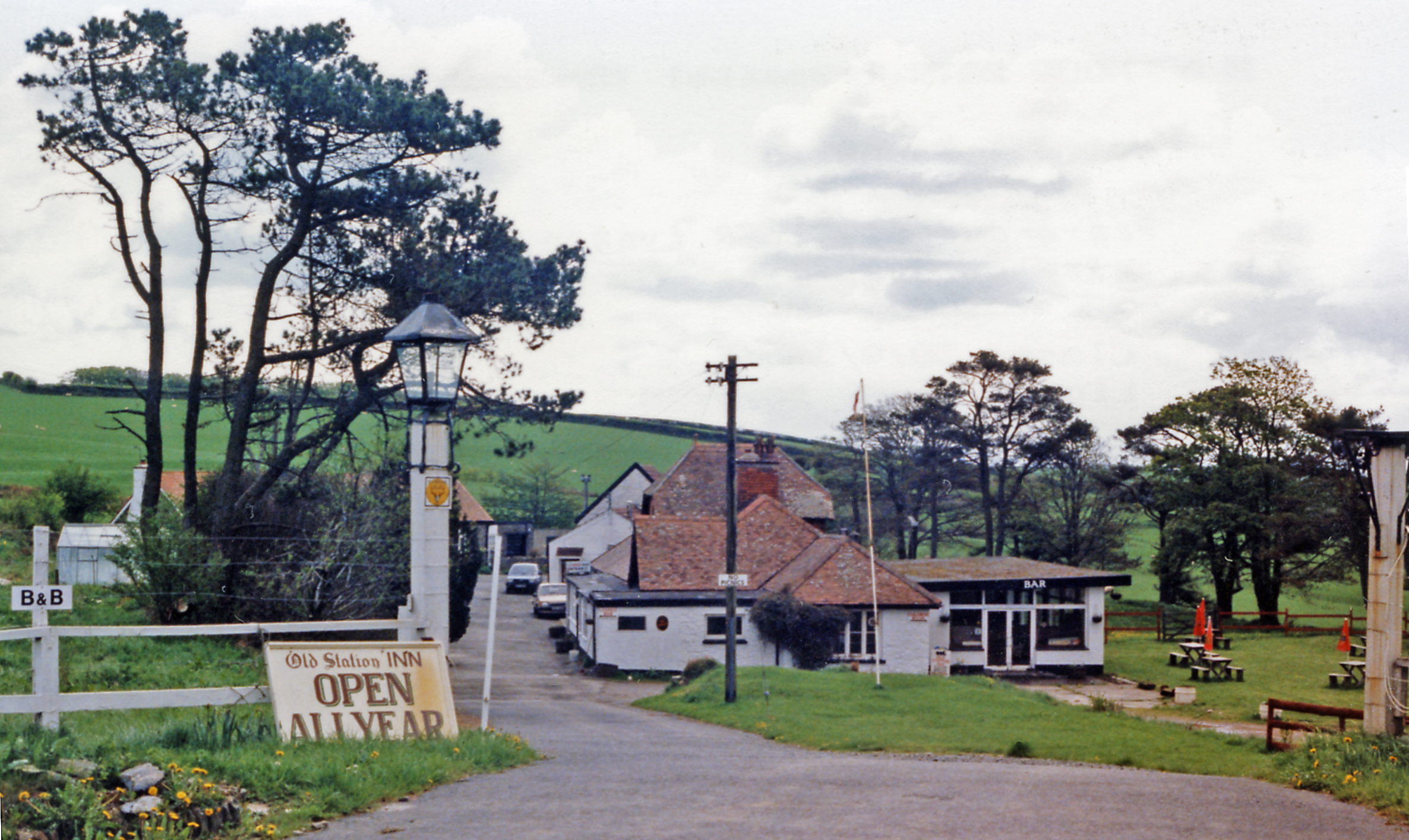
- Former Blackmoor station, 1987

General information
- Location: Exmoor, North Devon; England
- Grid reference: SS64664309
- Platforms: 2

Other information
- Status: Disused

History
- Original company: Lynton & Barnstaple
- Pre-grouping: Lynton and Barnstaple Railway
- Post-grouping: Southern

Key dates
- 11 May 1898: Opened
- 30 September 1935: Closed
Location

Blackmoor railway station was situated near to Blackmoor Gate in North Devon at the western boundary of what is now Exmoor National Park, England. , was on the Lynton and Barnstaple Railway, a narrow gauge line that ran through Exmoor from Barnstaple to Lynton and Lynmouth in North Devon.

== History ==
The Lynton and Barnstaple Railway, a narrow gauge line that ran through Exmoor from Barnstaple to Lynton, opened on 11 May 1898. The last trains ran on 29 September 1935 although since 1923 it had been part of the Southern Railway.

Blackmoor was the principal intermediate station on the line, situated at a crossroads about 900 feet (270 m) above sea level. Although remote, it served a number of small villages including Parracombe until Parracombe railway station opened further along the line in 1899.

== Description ==
The railway was generally single track but there were two tracks at Blackmoor to allow trains to pass. A chalet-style building, with passenger facilities and a house for the station master, was provided on the up platform which was used by trains towards Barnstaple. There was a goods yard and shed on the up side at the south end of the station, and a short siding on the down side (although this was removed in 1930).

The station was provided with a range stables for the horse bus to Ilfracombe. The station building has been extended over the track bed and is now a licensed restaurant. The bridge under the crossroads has been filled in.

A large livestock market was established across the road from the station. It was envisaged by the promoters of the railway that this would generate a healthy income. North Devon farmers, however, preferred to drive their cattle to market across country, than pay to have them shipped by rail.

== Services ==
The 1932 timetable showed up to 6 trains each way in the summer peak, but only 4 on quiet days in the winter. Trains took about half an hour to reach Lynton but about an hour and a quarter to reach Barnstaple.

Preceding station	Disused railways	Following station
Bratton Fleming	Lynton and Barnstaple Railway	Parracombe
