= William Eastman Palmer & Sons =

English photography studio

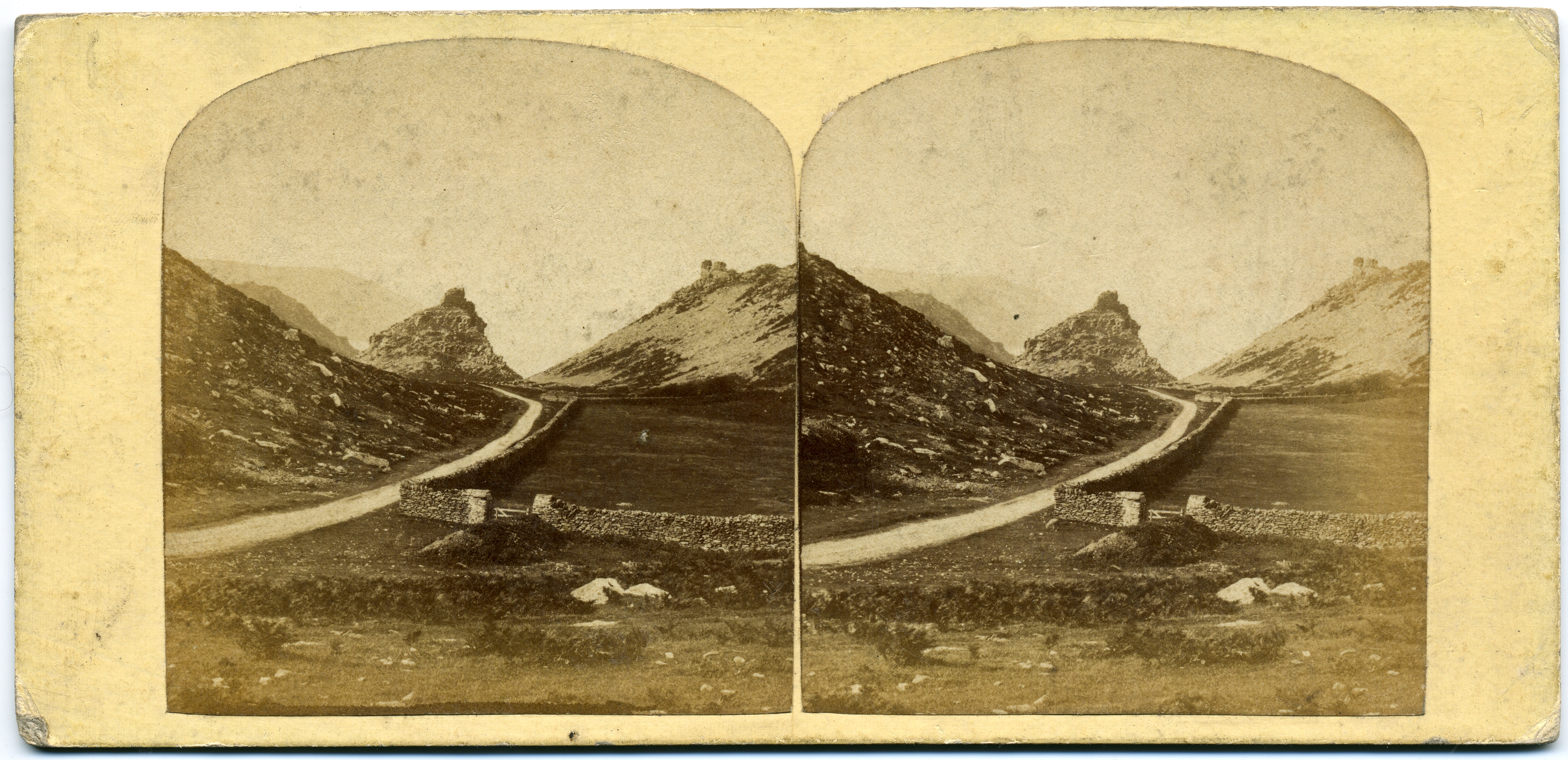
Stereoview of the Valley of Rocks in Devon, by W.E. Palmer 1860s

William Eastman Palmer & Sons was the name of a family partnership of photographers which was started in Devon in the 1860s by William Eastman Palmer and his wife Maria Louisa née Eales. By 1881 the five sons in the partnership were beginning to separate and to pursue their photographic careers further afield. As of 2011, the last recorded photograph by this family was made in 1935, in the Swindon area.

== William Eastman Palmer ==
William Eastman Palmer's mother was Christian Branton Eastman Lewis, and his father Henry Palmer was a shoemaker. They married in Okehampton, Devon in 1826. Their son W.E. Palmer was born in Devon around 1828 and in 1841 he was 13 years old and living with his family in West Street, Okehampton. He began adult life as a Royal Navy bandsman. He married Maria Louisa Eales on 13 March 1860 and they lived in James Street, Stoke Damerel, She was a "photographic artist", which could mean that she enhanced glass negatives or that she was trained to take photographs herself. It could have been her influence which brought the profession of photography into the family. Her husband's name, "Eastman", might appear to suggest some connection with the American family of George Eastman, but no evidence has been found for this. W.E. Palmer became a photographer in the mid-1860s, and by 9 January 1866 he was a journeyman photographer living at 31 Union Street, East Stonehouse, Plymouth. By 1871 they were at 13 Frances Street at St Andrew's in Plymouth. W.E. Palmer and his wife had twelve children including seven sons, at least five of whom were trained as photographers. Albany Edward Palmer trained as an insurance clerk. Dudley Sidney Montague Palmer, the youngest of William and Maria's 13 children, migrated to Perth, Western Australia, where he established a successful photography business in Piccadilly Arcade which flourished during the 1930s, 40s and 50s. William Eastman Palmer died in 1896, aged 67 in East Barnet. In 1891 the family business was at Hopetown Villa, Leicester Road, East Barnet.

=== Palmer's early photography ===
As of 2011, the earliest known photographs by William Eastman Palmer are stereoviews dating from the 1860s or 1870s. One (shown here) is a view from the Lyn Cliff Summerhouse of Lynton, Devon; another (illustrated above) is a view of the Valley of Rocks in Lynton; another (here) is a view of Ilfracombe. They are in sepia tone with a semi-gloss finish.

== John Eastman Palmer the elder ==
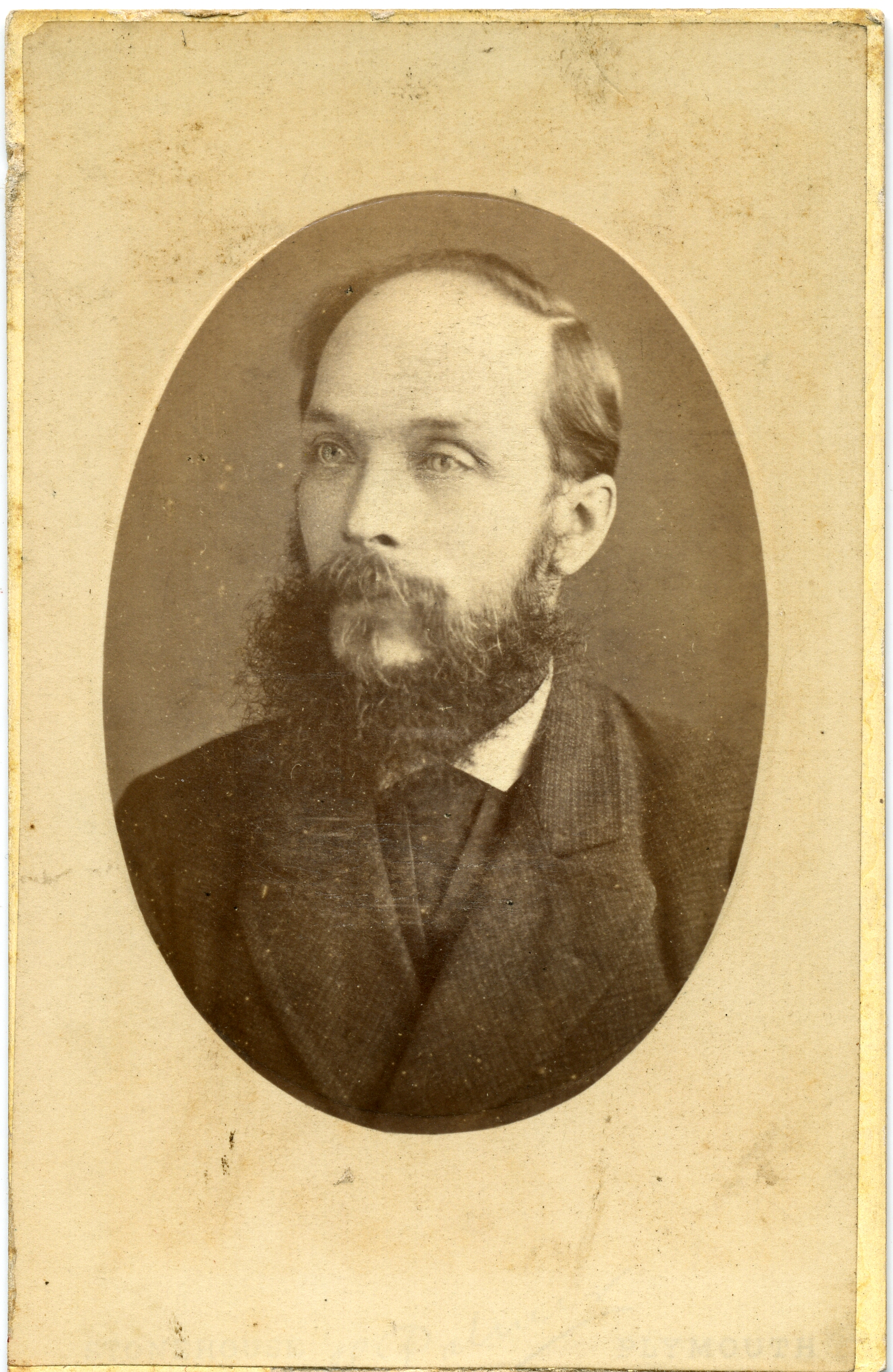
by J.E. Palmer, 1870s

John Eastman Palmer was born around 1830 in Devon; he was the brother of William Eastman Palmer, and in 1841 was living with his family in West Street, Okehampton. He signed his photographs John E. Palmer or J.E. Palmer. As of 2011 there are three known carte de visite photographs by J.E. Palmer, taken in the 1860s to 1880s when he was working from 58 Union Street, Stonehouse, Plymouth. The photographs are of an elderly widowed lady in an 1860s black bonnet and dress (shown here), a child aged two to four years (here), and a bearded man in his thirties (see image, right). The reverses of these cards (shown here) state that he was awarded a first class prize medal by the Royal Cornwall Polytechnic in 1865. The reverse of one card states that Royal letters patent were granted to him in 1872. He probably died in 1911, aged 83, at Newton Abbot.

The bearded man photograph provides an example of the photographic art of the era. On the one hand the photographer has used the light-coloured and unfocused eyes of the sitter to give a spiritual appearance to the face. On the other hand, by using the sitter's own qualities to create a spiritual aspect in the picture, he has created a compassionate portrait of a young man with an exotropic strabismus and an associated droopy eyelid. This strabismus can be observed by successively covering the left, then the right side of the face in the picture: the sitter's left eye looks straight at the camera; his right eye looks to one side. it is the quality of this art which may explain the awards listed above. It is possible that some of William Eastman Palmer's sons could have served their apprenticeships at this photographer's studio.

== The photographer sons ==
=== William George Palmer ===
William George was the eldest son to be apprenticed as a photographer.

=== John Eastman Palmer the younger ===
He signed his photographs J.E. Palmer.

=== Frederick Christian Palmer (1866–1941) ===
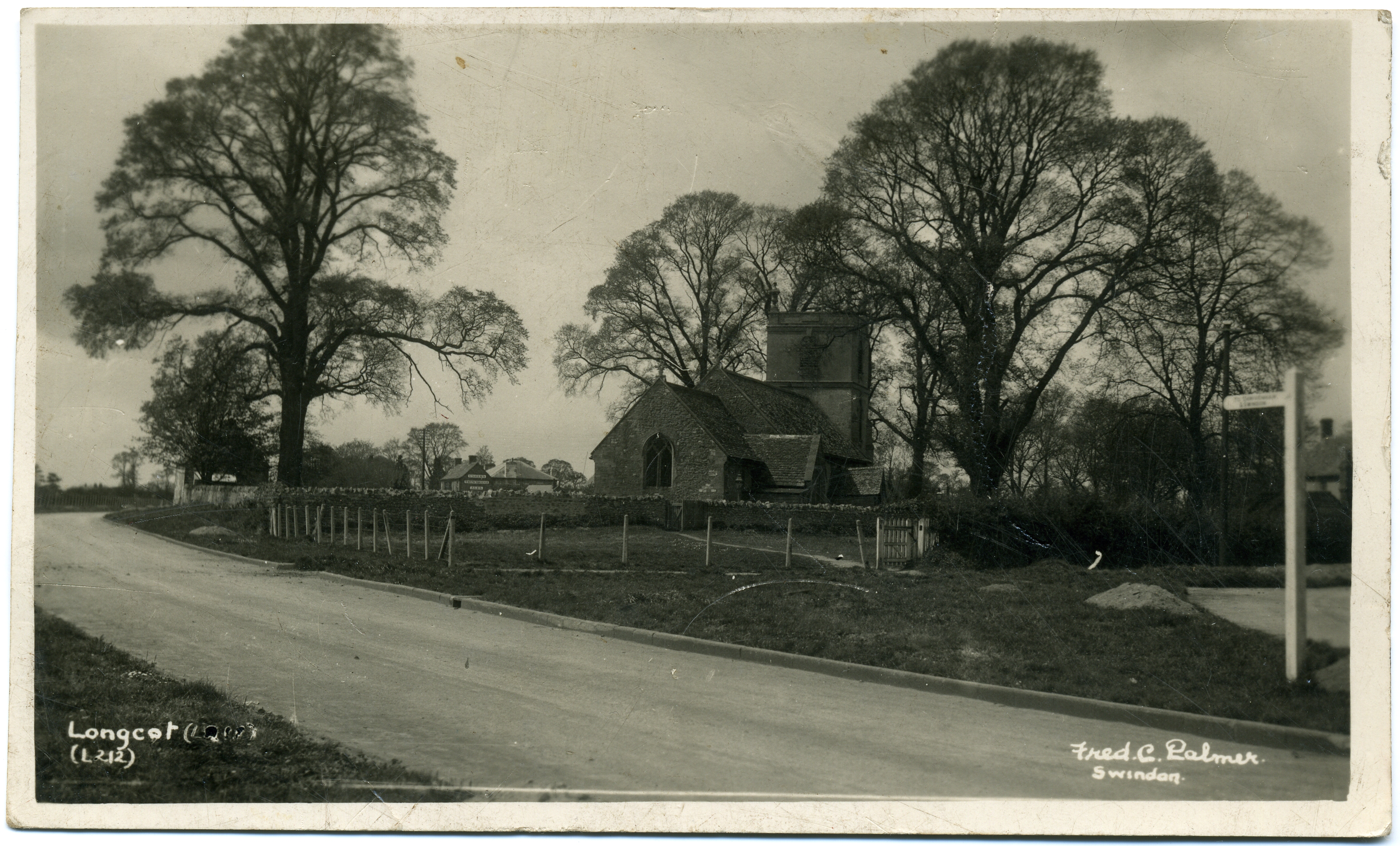
Fred C. Palmer's last known photo, c.1935

He was the third son, and known professionally as Fred C. Palmer. In 1881 in East Barnet he was 15 years old and had started his photographic apprenticeship. In 1891 when Frederick Christian was 25 years old, he was still living at home in East Barnet. He worked from studios in Herne Bay from 1903 to 1922, and in Swindon from 1922 to 1936 or 1937. As of 2011 there are over 70 known photographs and postcards by Fred C. Palmer. The earliest known (shown here) is a carte de visite photograph showing two girls, taken in Herne Bay and dated 1903–1905; the earliest known postcards (here) are the tinted photos of Minster-in-Thanet, taken in 1903–1904. The last known (here) is a postcard photo of Longcot, Oxfordshire, postmarked 1935.

=== Ernest Charles Palmer ===
He signed his photographs E.C. Palmer.

=== Henry Reginald Palmer ===
He signed his photographs H.R. Palmer.
