= Chelfham railway station =

Former railway station in Devon, England

Coordinates: 51.10388°N 3.98690°W

Chelfham
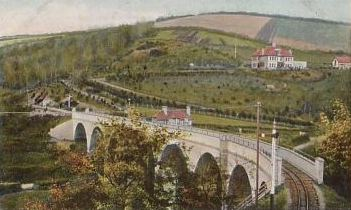
- An early view of Chelfham Viaduct and station

General information
- Location: Exmoor, North Devon; England
- Grid reference: SS60993572
- Platforms: 2

Other information
- Status: Disused

History
- Original company: Lynton and Barnstaple Railway
- Pre-grouping: Lynton and Barnstaple Railway
- Post-grouping: Southern Railway

Key dates
- 11 May 1898: Opened
- 30 September 1935: Closed
Location

Chelfham railway station was a station on the Lynton and Barnstaple Railway, a narrow gauge line that ran through Exmoor from Barnstaple to Lynton and Lynmouth in North Devon, England. The station stood at the head of the spectacular Chelfham Viaduct, and served the village of Chelfham below.

== History ==
It opened with the line on 11 May 1898, and closed with it after service on 29 September 1935. From 1923 until closure, the line was operated by the Southern Railway.

The Lynton and Barnstaple Railway Trust bought Chelfham station in 2000 and the station site is currently undergoing restoration while the group operates the railway at Woody Bay as a tourist attraction.

The weatherboard extension, originally built by the Southern Railway to house scales for weighing parcels, was damaged beyond repair by strong winds in 2006.

Preceding station	Disused railways	Following station
Snapper Halt	Lynton & Barnstaple Railway (1898-1935)	Bratton Fleming
