= Bratton Fleming railway station =

Former railway station in Devon, England

Coordinates: 51.12908°N 3.94282°W

Bratton Fleming
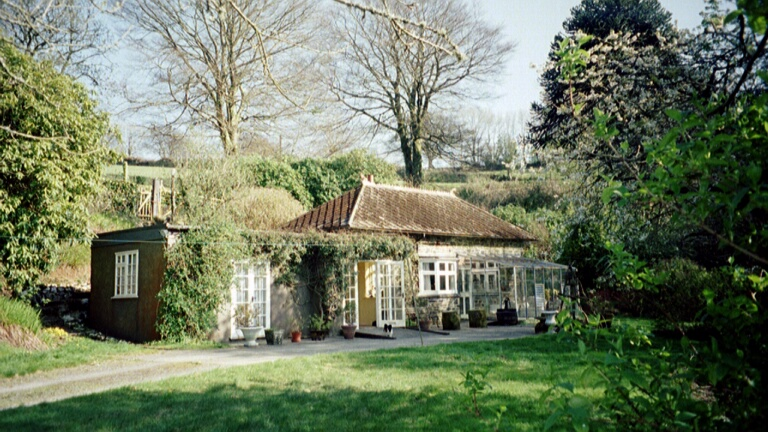
- The station building - a private residence - in 2004

General information
- Location: Exmoor, North Devon; England
- Grid reference: SS64153844
- Platforms: 2

Other information
- Status: Disused

History
- Original company: Lynton & Barnstaple
- Pre-grouping: Lynton and Barnstaple Railway
- Post-grouping: Southern

Key dates
- 11 May 1898: Opened
- 30 September 1935: Closed
Location

Bratton Fleming railway station is a former station on the Lynton and Barnstaple Railway in England, a narrow gauge line that ran through Exmoor from Barnstaple to Lynton and Lynmouth in North Devon. The station served the village of Bratton Fleming. It opened with the line on 11 May 1898, and closed with it after service on 29 September 1935. From 1923 until closure, the line was operated by the Southern Railway.

The station building was purchased by Exmoor Associates (for the Lynton and Barnstaple Railway Society) in November 2020 and is in use as a holiday home.

Preceding station	Disused railways	Following station
Chelfham	Lynton & Barnstaple Railway (1898-1935)	Blackmoor
