= Valley of Rocks (Hyde) =

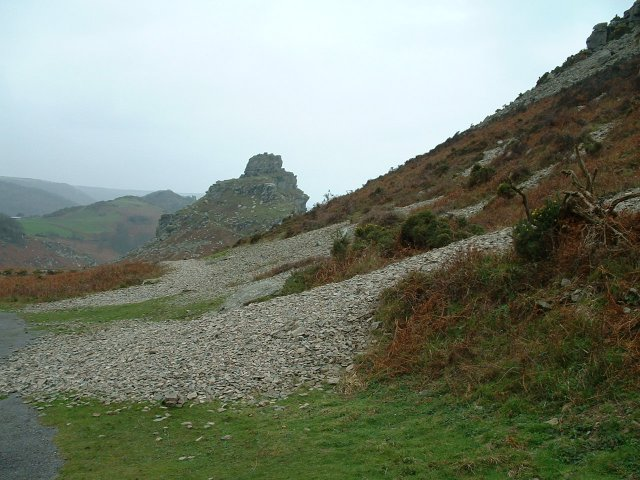
The Valley of Rocks, Devon, England

Valley of Rocks is a piano piece by the Australian composer Miriam Hyde. It is her best-known composition.

Valley of Rocks was composed in 1975, and was inspired by Miriam's 1974 visit with her husband Marcus Edwards to the Valley of Rocks near the village of Lynton in North Devon, England.

It is quite short, lasting only about five minutes.

The work was set as one of the compulsory Australian pieces at the 1988 Sydney International Piano Competition. Contestants chose one of seven nominated works; the majority (23 of 38 contestants) chose Valley of Rocks. The broadcast of the competition by ABC Classic FM led to the piece being taken up by pianists and students all over the country, and it soon became her best known work.

Miriam Hyde recorded the work in 1991, at the Canberra School of Music. It has also been recorded by Kathryn Selby and other pianists.
