= Martinhoe =

Village in Devon, England

Coordinates: 51.2216°N 3.9098°W

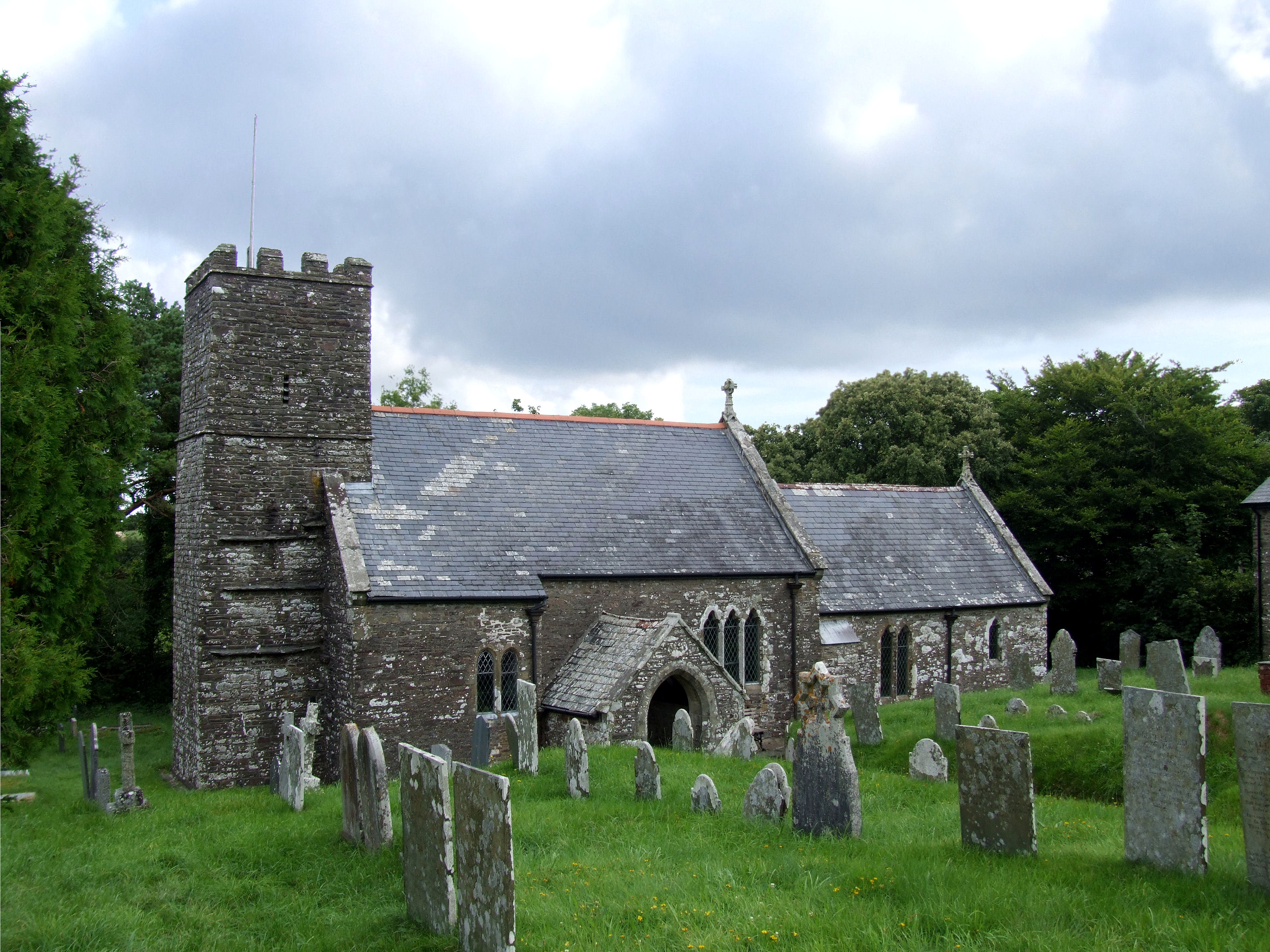
Church of St Martin in Martinhoe

Martinhoe is a small settlement and civil parish in North Devon district of Devon, England. Martinhoe is within the Exmoor National Park, the smallest National Park in England. In the 2011 census Martinhoe Parish was recorded as having a population of 159. Martinhoe is in the Combe Martin ward, for elections to the district council. Martinhoe's local government takes the form of a parish meeting and as such has no parish council nor elected parish councillors.

The origins of Martinhoe can be traced from the first century AD when the nearby Roman forts guarded the sea between England and Wales.

The northern boundary of the parish is the coast of the Bristol Channel, along which goes the South West Coast Path. The neighbouring parishes are Lynton and Lynmouth to the east, Parracombe to the south, Kentisbury to the south west, and Combe Martin to the west.

The parish church of St Martin dates in part from the late 13th or early 14th century and is Grade II* listed. It is in the Diocese of Exeter, and services are held once a month. The boundaries of the church consist of Devon hedges.

St Martin's churchyard once had two ancient Irish yew trees, but one was lost in the winter storms of 2021. The one remaining is adjacent to the old rectory. Two English yew tree saplings were planted in 2022.

There are 16 listed buildings in the parish, all at Grade II except the church. The Beacon Roman fortlet, above the coast to the north west of the village, was occupied for a short time in the first century AD and was excavated in the 1960s. The fort can only be accessed from the South West Coast Path and not from the Martinhoe settlement itself. The fort was past of a first century Roman fort complex Martinhoe Roman Fort

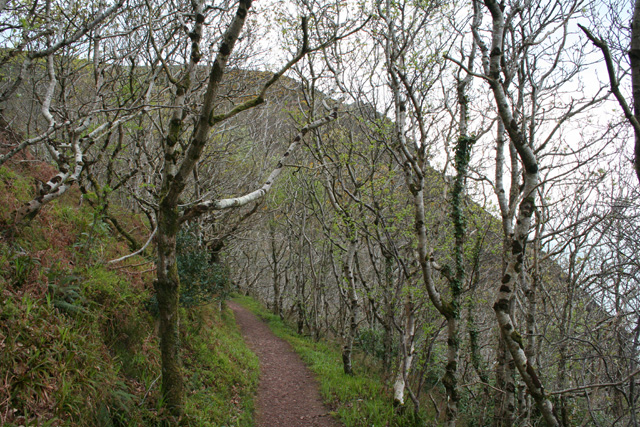
Martinhoe Footpaths

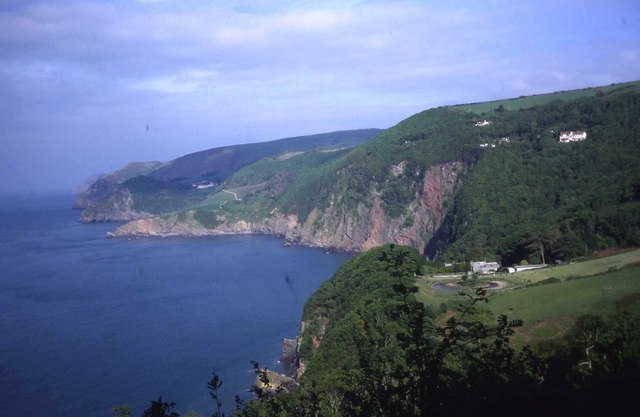
Bristol Channel: View from Martinhoe

Hannington Hall, opposite the church of St Martin, was named after James Hannington, a curate of Martinhoe and who lived in what is now The Old Rectory Hotel, next to St Martin's. Bishop Hannington was martyred in Uganda in 1885. A new access path was added to Hannington Hall in August 2024.

American modernist poet H.D. (Hilda Doolittle) and her husband, English author Richard Aldington, moved into the Martinhoe School House in 1916. H.D. wrote many of her poems and essays there.

Woody Bay on the coast of the parish was the site of a failed development plan in the 1890s. It is now home to rare flora. Woody Bay is owned by the National Trust.

Heddon Valley is in the Martinhoe Parish. The valley is home to rare butterflies. The valley is owned by the National Trust.

The River Heddon flows through the Heddon Valley into the Bristol Channel at Heddon Mouth where there is an old lime kiln.

The Lynton and Barnstaple Railway ran through the southern part of the parish, and Woody Bay railway station is in the parish; at 964 feet (294 m) it is said to be the highest railway station in southern England. The Lynton and Barnstaple Railway Trust operates narrow gauge trains over one mile of track between the station and Killington Lane. The service runs mainly in the warmer months but has a Santa Express at Christmas. It recently had planning permission to extend the line to the Blackmoor Gate.

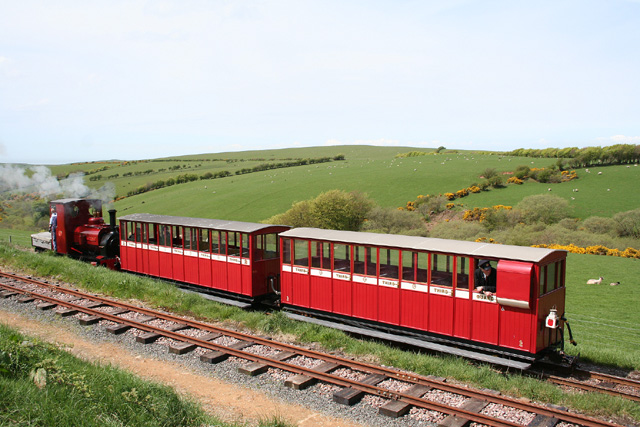
Lynton and Barnstaple Railway

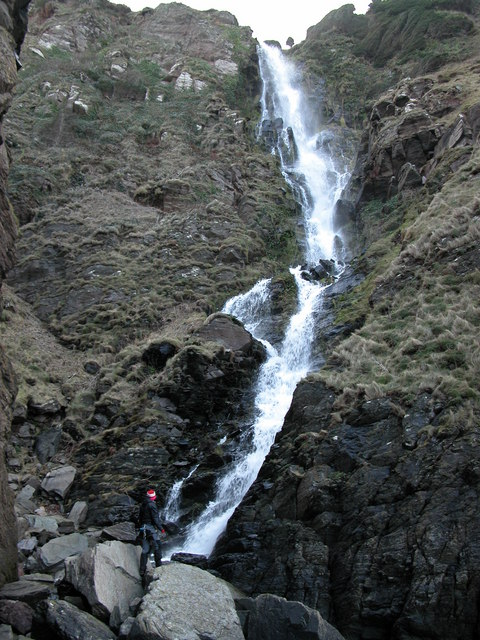
Hollow Brook waterfall

Hollow Brook (or Hollowbrook) Waterfall, which drops to the sea due north of the village and ca be seen from the South West Coast Path, is claimed to be "the westcountry's [sic] highest coastal waterfall, and one of the highest in Britain", dropping 210 metres (690 ft) in a series of falls including two of 50 metres (160 ft), over 400 metres (1,300 ft) horizontal distance.
