= Linton railway station =

Linton railway station may refer to:

- Linton railway station (Cambridgeshire), a closed station on the Stour Valley Railway in England
- Linton railway station, Palmerston North, a closed station on the North Island Main Trunk in New Zealand
- Linton railway station, Victoria, a closed station on the Skipton railway line in Australia
- Lynton and Lynmouth railway station, a closed station on the Lynton and Barnstaple Railway in England
- Linton station (Indiana) a atation on the Terre Haute Division in Indiana
