= Roborough =

Roborough may refer to:

== Places in Devon, England ==
- Roborough, South Hams, near Plymouth
  - Roborough Hundred, a former administrative division
  - RAF Roborough, a former Royal Air Force station
- Roborough, Torridge, near Winkleigh
- Roborough Castle, close to Lynton

== Other ==
- Baron Roborough, a title in the Peerage of the United Kingdom
