= Lynton and Barnstaple Railway Company Limited =

Private railway company in Devon, England

- Company type: Private
- Industry: Rail industry
- Founded: 11 August 1993
- Founders: Lynton and Barnstaple Railway Association members
- Defunct: 2007
- Fate: Merged
- Successor: Lynton & Barnstaple Railway CIC
- Headquarters: Barnstaple, Devon, England
- Website: lynton-rail.co.uk

The Lynton and Barnstaple Railway Company Limited was a private company, limited by guarantee, with no share capital It was incorporated on 11 August 1993 as The Lynton & Barnstaple Light Railway Company Limited (name changed on 8 February 2002), the company was registered at Companies House in Great Britain as company number 02844182. The company was dissolved in 2009.

The company was formed by members of the Lynton and Barnstaple Railway Association (now a charitable trust) to rebuild and operate, using mainly volunteer labour, the Victorian narrow-gauge railway which ran across 20 miles of North Devon between 1898 and 1935. The railway re-opened to passengers in 2004, and is based at Woody Bay.

In 2007 the Lynton & Barnstaple Railway Community interest company (CIC) was formed by the merger and conversion of two existing companies, simplifying the structural relationship between the operating company and the trust and, through the CIC status, adding value and encouraging greater local community involvement. The company is registered at Companies House with the number 03390170.

== See also ==
- Lynton & Barnstaple Railway
- Lynton & Barnstaple Railway Trust, a Charitable Trust heading the project to restore and reopen the L&B
