= Leslie McLean =

English cricketer

Personal information
- Full name: Leslie Eric McLean
- Born: 19 April 1918; Lynton, Devon, England
- Died: 16 December 1987 (aged 69); Guildford, Surrey, England
- Batting: Right-handed

Domestic team information
- Years: Team
- 1936–1939: Hertfordshire
- 1939: Oxford University

Career statistics
| Competition | First-class |
|---|---|
| Matches | 3 |
| Runs scored | 79 |
| Batting average | 13.16 |
| 100s/50s | –/1 |
| Top score | 51 |
| Catches/stumpings | 3/– |
- Source: Cricinfo, 4 July 2019

Leslie Eric McLean (19 April 1918 – 16 December 1987) was an English first-class cricketer.

McLean was born in April 1918 at Lynton, Devon. He was educated at Bishop's Stortford College before going up to Christ Church, Oxford. While studying at Oxford, he made his debut in first-class cricket for Oxford University against Derbyshire at Oxford in 1939. He made two further first-class appearances in 1939, against Lancashire and the Free Foresters. He scored a total of 79 runs in these three matches, with a high score of 51. He had made his debut in minor counties cricket for Hertfordshire in 1936, with McLean playing minor counties cricket until 1939, making a total of thirteen appearances in the Minor Counties Championship.

His first-class and minor counties career was ultimately cut short by the Second World War. He served in the war with the Royal Marines, enlisting as a second lieutenant in November 1939. He was made an acting temporary lieutenant in March 1940, before being made a temporary lieutenant in April 1940. He died at Guildford in December 1987.
