= Chelfham Viaduct =

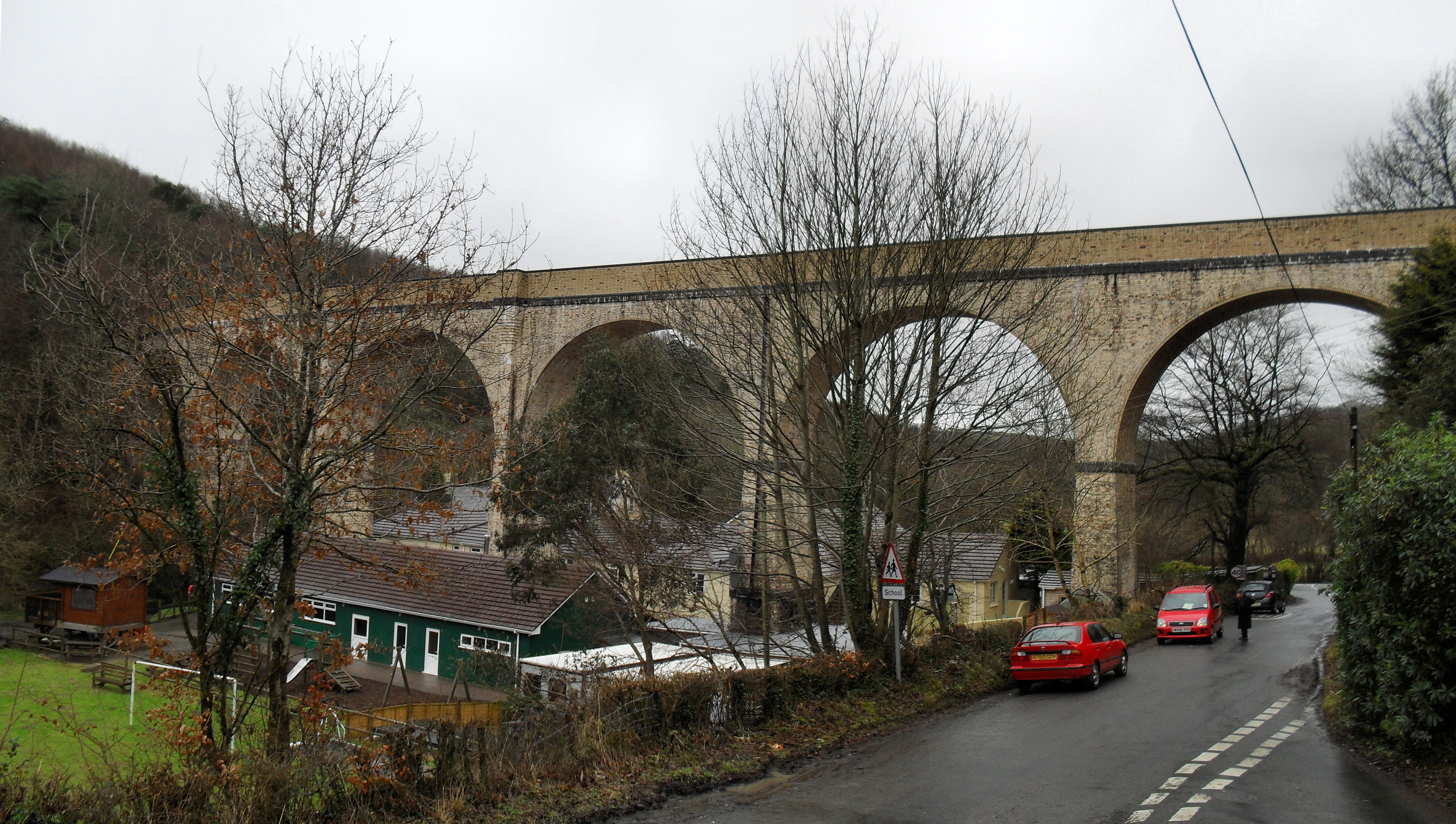
- Chelfham Viaduct (2010)
- Coordinates: 51.10388°N 3.98690°W
- Crosses: Stoke Rivers Valley
- Locale: Chelfham, North Devon
- Heritage status: Grade II listed structure

Characteristics
- Material: Brick
- Total length: 400 feet (120 m)
- Height: 70 feet (21 m)

History
- Designer: F. W. Chanter
- Opened: 1898
- Closed: 1935

Location
- Interactive map of Chelfham Viaduct

Chelfham Viaduct is a railway viaduct built in 1896–97 to carry the single track, narrow-gauge Lynton and Barnstaple Railway (L&B) across the Stoke Rivers valley at Chelfham in Devon.

== Design ==
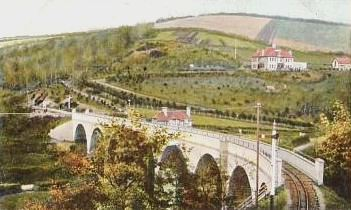
Chelfham Viaduct: Newly built, about 1900

The viaduct was designed by the L&B's engineer, F. W. Chanter. It contains over a quarter of a million Marland bricks. It is 132 yards (121 m) long with eight arches, each 42 feet (13 m) wide and 70 feet (21 m) high. This makes it the largest narrow gauge railway structure in England.

Chelfham Viaduct was Bridge number 22 of the 80 that carried or spanned the railway over its 19-mile (31 km) length. The viaduct was classified as a Grade II listed structure on 25 February 1965.

== After closure ==
After the L&B closed in 1935, most of the track bed, buildings and land from the line was sold at auction in 1938. The viaduct, however, was not sold. In 1943, it featured as a location in the war-time film The Flemish Farm, representing a Franco-Spanish border crossing. It is probable that such a redundant structure would normally have been dismantled, either then, or shortly afterwards during the Second World War, as happened to the smaller viaduct at Lancey Brook, which was destroyed as a demolition training exercise by the Army. However, a school and other buildings at its base made it uneconomical to dismantle, so it remained in Southern Railway ownership, passing to British Railways on the nationalisation of the railways in Britain in 1948, and in 2001, becoming part of the Historical Railways Estate. until the Highways Agency took over properties held and managed by BRB(R) on 30 September 2013 prior to it being wound up.

The Highways Agency Annual Report for 2013-14 stated the following:

"The British Railways Board (Residuary) Ltd (BRBR) was wound-up on 30 September 2013. The ongoing functions of BRBR were subsequently dispersed to a number of successor bodies, including the Agency. From 1 October 2013, the Agency is discharging the Secretary of State’s responsibility for the maintenance and management of the BRBR Historic Estate which consists of over 3,400 tunnels, bridges, viaducts, culverts and other structures; plus around 230 public road supporting structures and 85 parcels of land associated with access to these structures.

The Historic Estate assets were transferred to the Secretary of State at nil value. These assets, together with any related contingent liabilities, are included in the Department for Transport’s accounts."

== Restoration ==
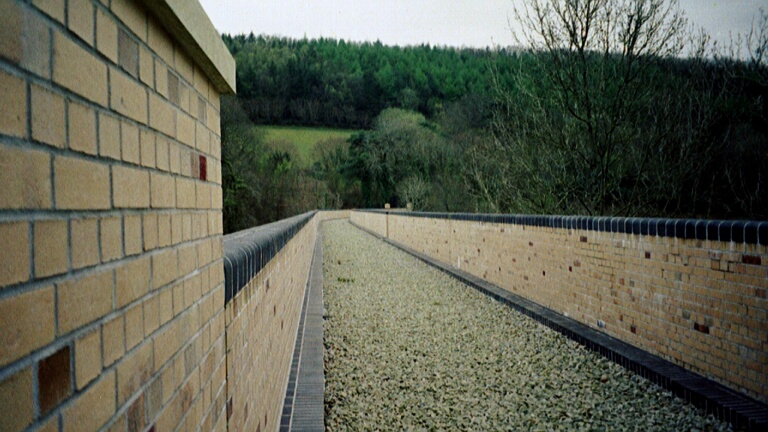
Chelfham Viaduct: New deck and parapets, 2003

The viaduct was extensively restored in 2000. This included fitting a waterproof membrane to the deck, improvements to rainwater drainage, and restoration of the parapets, leaving the structure once again ready to carry rail transport. The project was funded by BRB and the Railway Heritage Trust. The Lynton and Barnstaple Railway Company, which owns the nearby Chelfham railway station helped fund the restoration of the parapets and the upgrading of the waterproof membrane as part of long-term plans to reopen the line.
