= Snapper Halt railway station =

Railway station in North Devon, England

Snapper Halt

General information
- Location: North Devon; England
- Coordinates: 51.0916°N 4.0110°W
- Grid reference: SS 59265 34401
- Platforms: 1

Other information
- Status: Disused

History
- Original company: Lynton and Barnstaple Railway
- Pre-grouping: Lynton and Barnstaple Railway
- Post-grouping: Southern

Key dates
- 1903: Opened
- 30 September 1935: Closed
Location

Snapper Halt railway station was a station on the Lynton and Barnstaple Railway, a narrow gauge line that ran through Exmoor from Barnstaple to Lynton and Lynmouth in North Devon, England. The station served a rural area near the hamlet of Snapper.

== History ==
The hamlet derives its name from the station, which in turn was named after the nearby Inn of the same name. The "Snapper" Inn had long become a private house by the time the railway arrived, and is now known by the name 'Glendale'. It is widely believed that the Inn and the hamlet derived its name from La Snappe, which was first shown recorded here in 1256 and means boggy land, inferior pasture or winter pasture.

The halt opened in 1903 at the request of the village of Goodleigh, and closed with the line after the last train on 29 September 1935. Trains stopped here by request, but never after dark. From 1923 until closure, the line was operated by the Southern Railway.

After closure, one of the coaches - 6991 - was placed on a short length of track at Snapper halt, and used as a summer house. It was truncated in the 1950s and was eventually burned in the mid-1960s. Some remains of the metalwork was recovered in February 2011 and is waiting reinstatement on a heritage coach of the same layout.

Another coach - 6993 - was left further along the track. In 1959 this was removed by the newly resurrected Festiniog Railway and has now run more miles as Buffet Car 14 in Wales than it ever did in Devon.

== Present day ==
In December 2010, Exmoor Associates (EA) - a private company dedicated to securing L&B trackbed for eventual use by the revived railway - completed the purchase of Snapper Halt and 700 yards (640 m) of the original trackbed, including bridge 15 - a cattle creep - which is still in situ.

The station building - a simple concrete shelter - still stands and was fitted with a new tiled roof by EA Volunteers in February 2011, replacing the rusted corrugated iron roof that had been in place for many years. At the same time as the roof was replaced, the platform and trackbed were cleared of undergrowth to improve access for maintenance and management.

Preceding station	Disused railways	Following station
Pilton (Goods Only)	Lynton & Barnstaple Railway (1898-1935)	Chelfham

== Sources ==
- Butt, R. V. J. (October 1995). The Directory of Railway Stations: details every public and private passenger station, halt, platform and stopping place, past and present (1st ed.). Sparkford: Patrick Stephens Ltd. ISBN 978-1-85260-508-7. OCLC 60251199. OL 11956311M.
- Jowett, Alan (March 1989). Jowett's Railway Atlas of Great Britain and Ireland: From Pre-Grouping to the Present Day (1st ed.). Sparkford: Patrick Stephens Ltd. ISBN 978-1-85260-086-0. OCLC 22311137.
- "Exmoor Associates news item: Snapper Halt Is Ours!". 10 December 2010.
- Gover, J.E.B.; Mawer, A.; Stenton, F.M. (November 1931). "Review of The Place Names of Devon". Geographical Journal. 78 (5): 464/5. doi:10.2307/1784859. JSTOR 1784859. OCLC 482385470.
- Gover, J.E.B.; Mawer, A.; Stenton, F.M. (July 1932). "Review of The Place Names of Devon. Part II". Geographical Journal. 80 (1): 57. doi:10.2307/1785389. JSTOR 1785389. OCLC 482399339.
