= Chelfham =

Village in Devon, England

Coordinates: 51.104°N 3.987°W

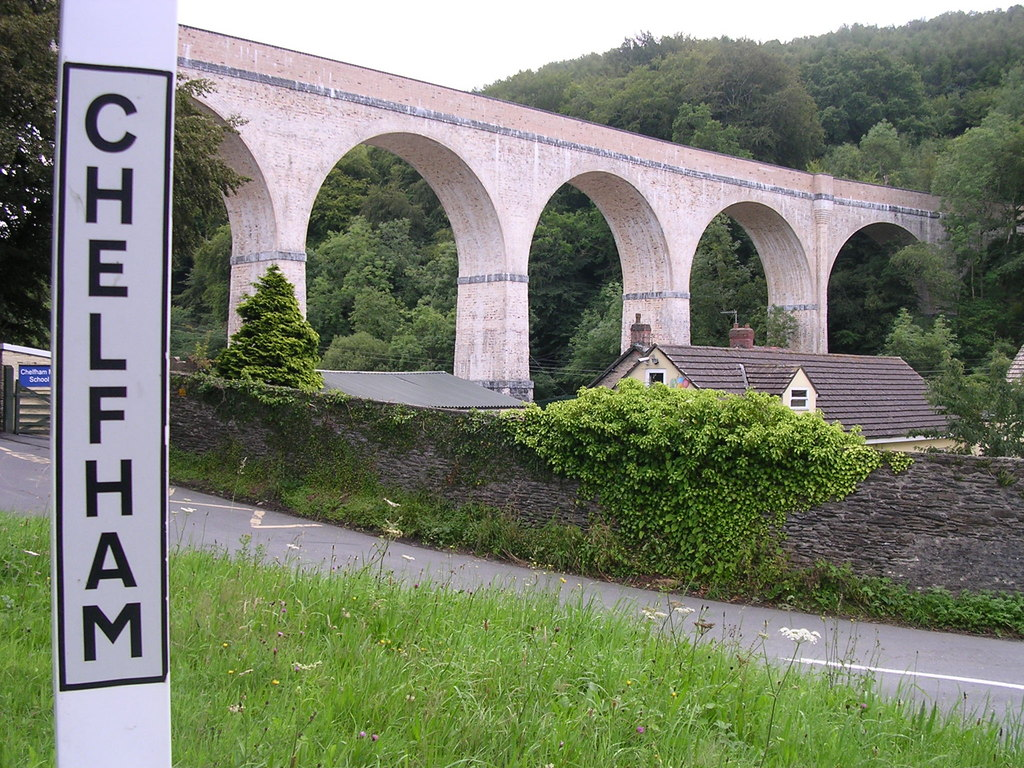
- Chelfham Viaduct

- Location within Devon
- Shire county: Devon
- Region: South West
- Country: England
- Sovereign state: United Kingdom
- Police: Devon and Cornwall
- Fire: Devon and Somerset
- Ambulance: South Western

Chelfham is a small borough in North Devon, England. It is situated between Bratton Fleming and Barnstaple (the largest town in North Devon). The village had a closed special education school, and also a disused railway viaduct and station.
