= Valley of Rocks =

Valley in Devon, England

Coordinates: 51.233°N 3.853°W

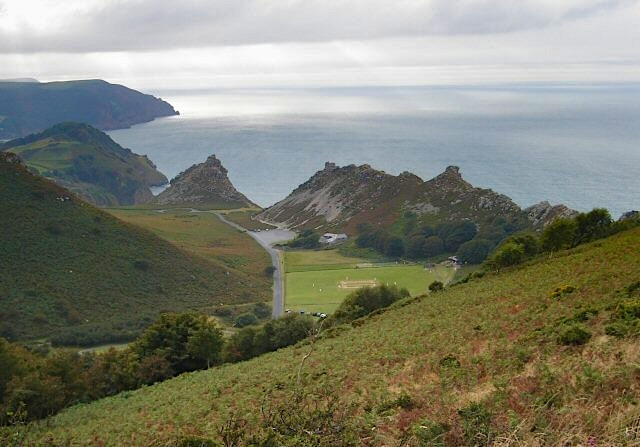
A view of the Valley of Rocks from Hollerday Hill

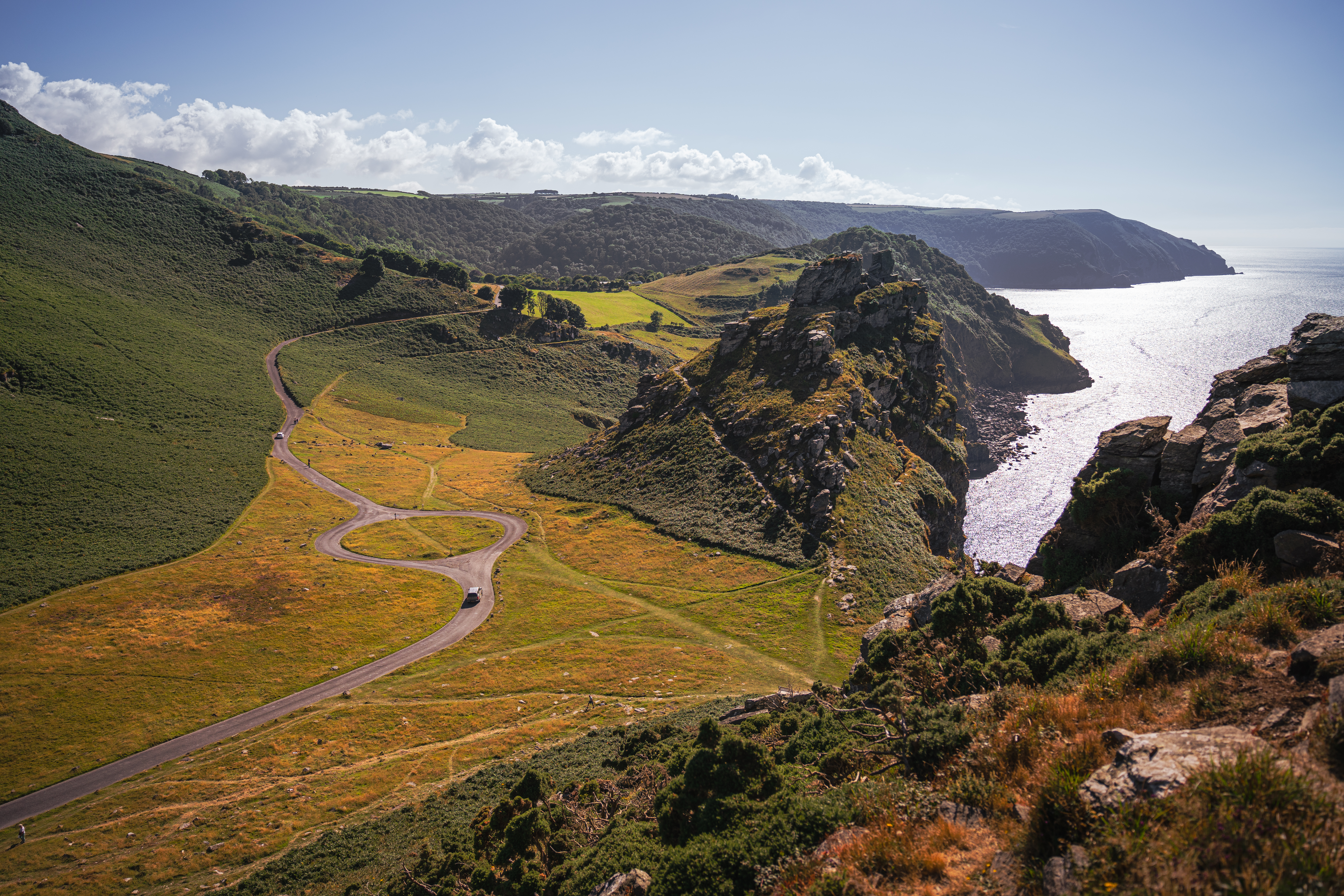
Valley of Rocks

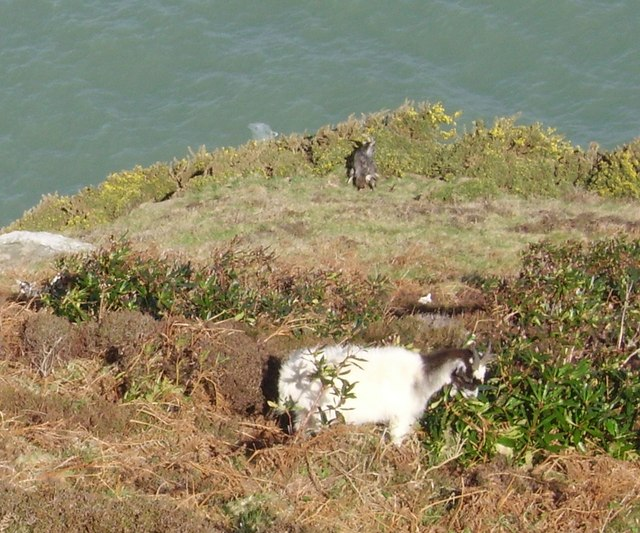
Feral goats grazing

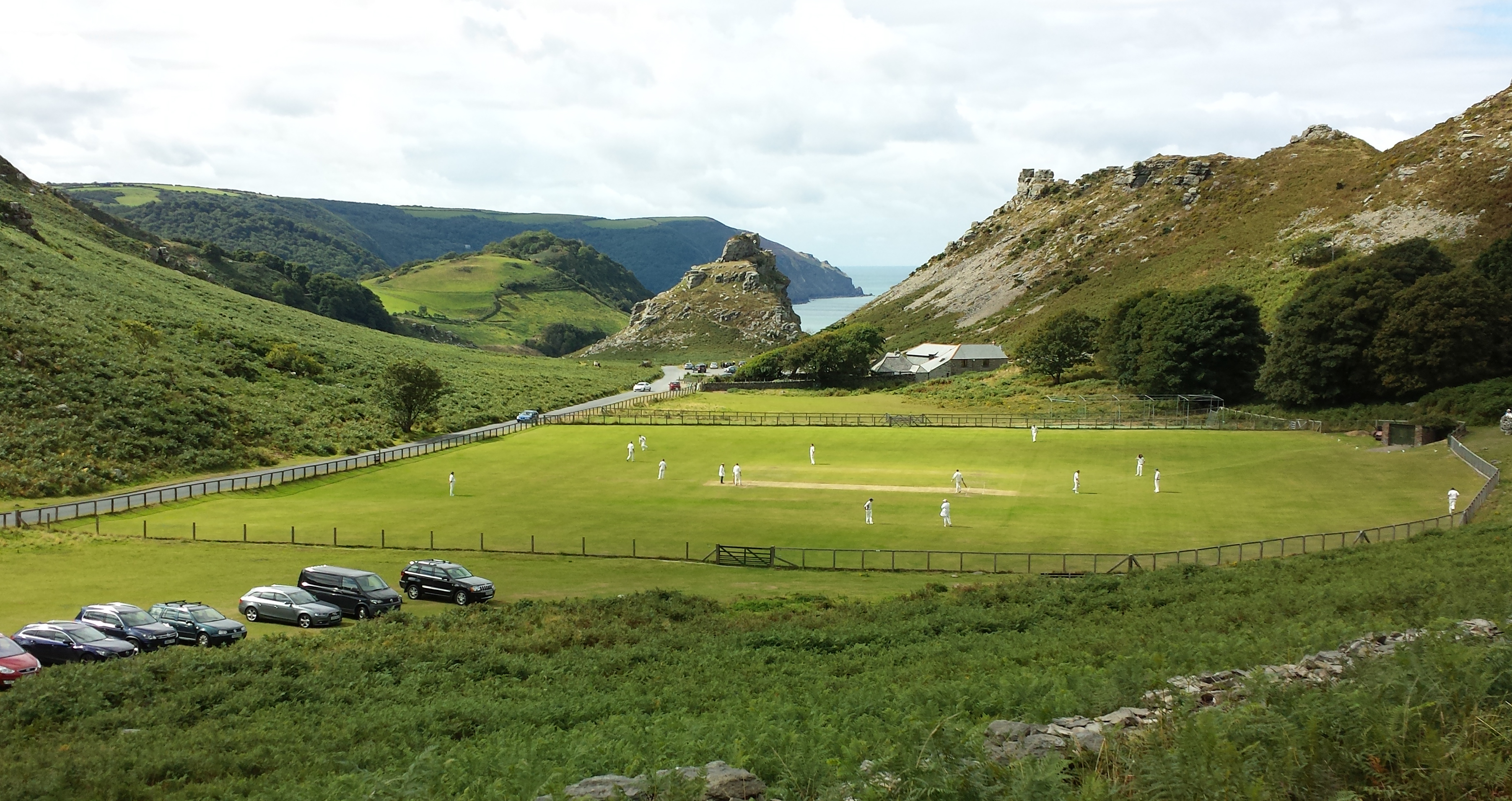
Lynton & Lynmouth Cricket Club

The Valley of Rocks, sometimes called Valley of the Rocks, is a dry valley that runs parallel to the coast in north Devon, England, about 1 kilometre (0.6 mi) to the west of the village of Lynton. It is a popular tourist destination, noted for its herd of feral goats, and for its landscape and geology.

== Geology and landscape ==
The valley has good exposures of the Lynton Beds (formally the 'Lynton Formation') that are among the oldest Devonian rocks in north Devon and are highly fossiliferous. Also of note are the periglacial features formed when this area was at the limit of glaciation during the last Ice Age. The valley is believed to owe its existence to the dissection by coastal cliff recession of a former extension of the valley of the East Lyn River which now meets the sea at Lynmouth.

== Archaeology ==
In 1793 the Reverend Richard Polwhele wrote "The Valley of Stones [...] is so awfully magnificent that we need not hesitate in pronouncing it to have been the favourite residence of Druidism." and seventeen years later, topographer George Alexander Cooke noted "The central part of the valley contains several circles of stone, above forty feet in diameter, most probably Druidical remains", but by 1854 local landowner Charles Bailey was deploring the quarrying and building of stone walls and fences that had, of late, been disfiguring the valley, lamenting "...worse than either, the removal of immense Druidical stones and circles which formed its peculiar and striking interest, for the purpose of selling them for gateposts.

By 1917, this work of despoliation had progressed to such a degree that John Presland was not greatly impressed by what remained, noting

...the Valley of Rocks, about which so much has been written...[comparing it with]...the scene of some titanic conflict... Any walker who goes with this in mind must, I think, be disappointed; the place is wild enough... There are hut circles of the Neolithic age in the valley, though many of them have been destroyed by the people who live around, to build the walls of their own cottages; but the oft-repeated fantasy of this valley as the haunt of Druid rites seems to me, not only unsupported by evidence, but without justification, in the formation of the valley or the wilderness of the rocks.

A study carried out in 2022 records the remains of the following as present in the area: a hut circle settlement and field system of uncertain age (Late Prehistoric - 4000 BCE? to 42 CE?), a Bronze Age burial cairn datable to the period 2500 BCE to 701 BCE and a clearance cairn of unknown date.

The valley retains some of its original character and presents an appropriately grand natural setting for open-air theatre, but the addition to it of a cricket pitch and, more recently, a car park have robbed the area between the landward and seaward walls of crags of some of the wildness it once possessed.

== Literary and musical connections ==
In late 1797, Samuel Taylor Coleridge and William Wordsworth visited the valley together and decided to write a prose tale called "The Wanderings of Cain" set there, though it was never completed. The poet Robert Southey was a visitor in August 1799, and was impressed, describing it as "covered with huge stones … the very bones and skeletons of the earth; rock reeling upon rock, stone piled upon stone, a huge terrific mass". In her poetical illustration to an engraving of a painting by Thomas Allom, Letitia Elizabeth Landon views the place as suitable for the unhappy, but, as she puts it "Gloomy vale! if thou couldst be haunt for human misery, half our life were spent with thee". (Fisher's Drawing Room Scrap Book, 1832) Later, R. D. Blackmore set part of his novel Lorna Doone (first published in 1869) in the valley.

A visit to the area in 1974 by the Australian composer Miriam Hyde with her husband led to her writing the piano piece Valley of Rocks in 1975, which became her best-known composition.

A shelter built in the 1920s and previously known as "Model Gate" was restored in the 1970s and is now known as Poet's Shelter.

== Present use ==
There is a cricket ground which hosts the Lynton & Lynmouth Cricket Club, founded in August 1876.

Open-air theatre productions have taken place in the summer since 2016.

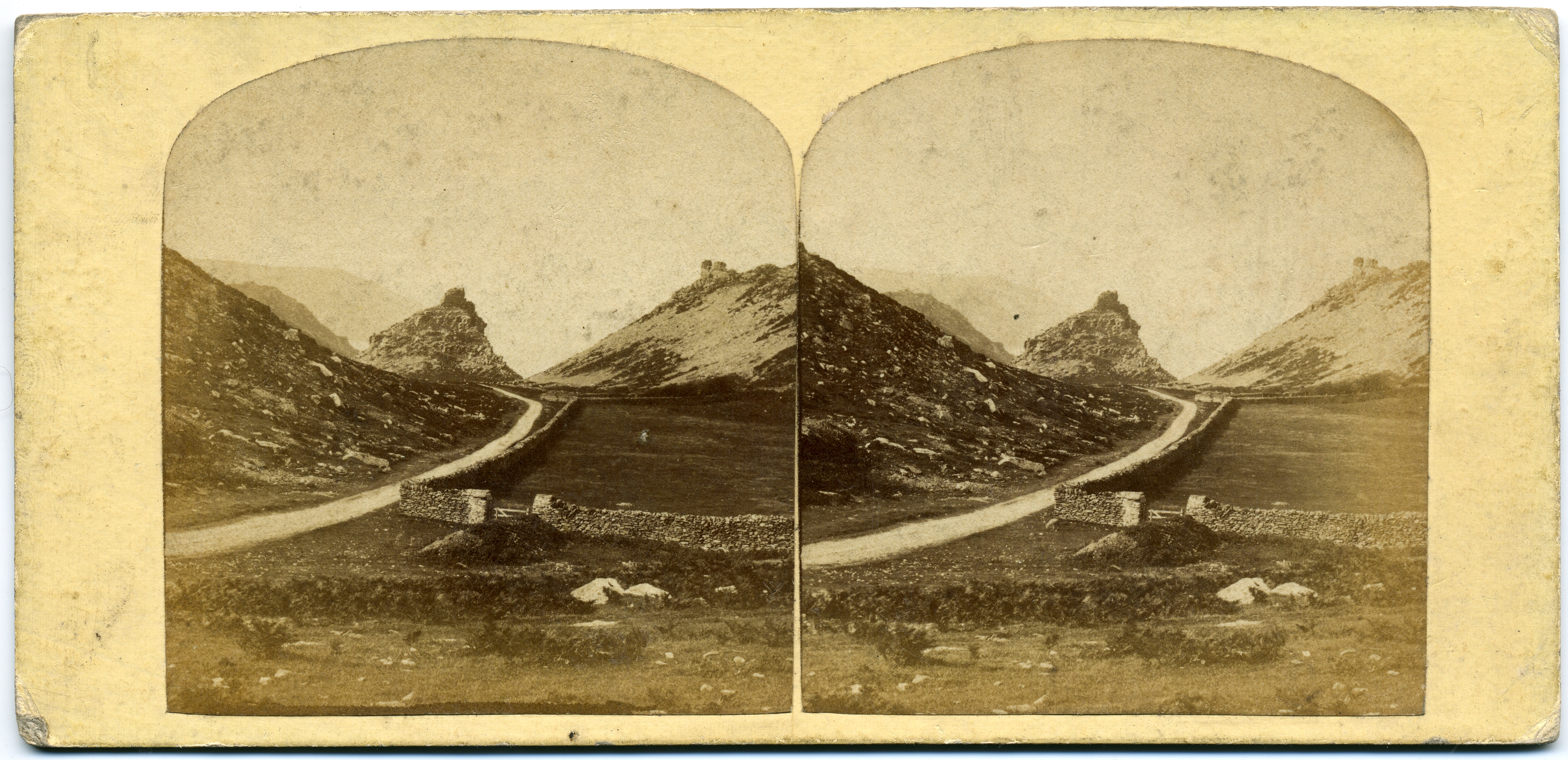
Stereoview of Valley of Rocks photographed by W.E. Palmer around the time that Blackmore wrote Lorna Doone
