= Lyn and Exmoor Museum =

Museum in north Devon, England

Coordinates: 51°13′46″N 3°49′46″W

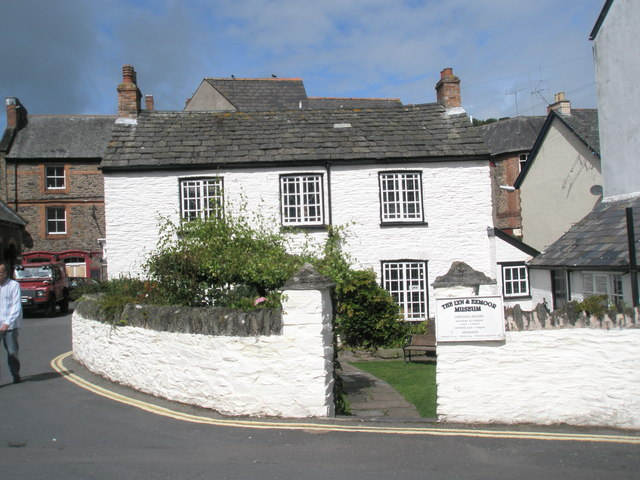
Exterior of the Lyn and Exmoor Museum

Map showing the location of Lyn and Exmoor Museum within Devon.

The Lyn and Exmoor Museum is a small museum in Lynton, Devon, England, housed in the town's oldest surviving domestic dwelling, a Grade II listed, whitewashed, stone cottage.

There are seven rooms of displays and a garden.

This local museum has displays which include a traditional Exmoor kitchen, paintings, engravings and photographs illustrating life in the area over a period of 200 years, including the Lynmouth Flood Disaster of 1952, photographs and models of the Lynton and Barnstaple Railway, Stone Age implements and other archaeological remains found on Exmoor, agricultural tools and equipment used on local farms in the past, a ship's figurehead and other exhibits of maritime heritage, a Victorian doll's house and other toys, birds, animals, fossils, rocks, minerals and other natural history items from Exmoor and material relating to the novel Lorna Doone which was set in the region.

Entry costs £3 for adults and 50p for children.
