= Blackmoor Gate =

Village in Devon, England

Coordinates: 51°10′N 3°56′W

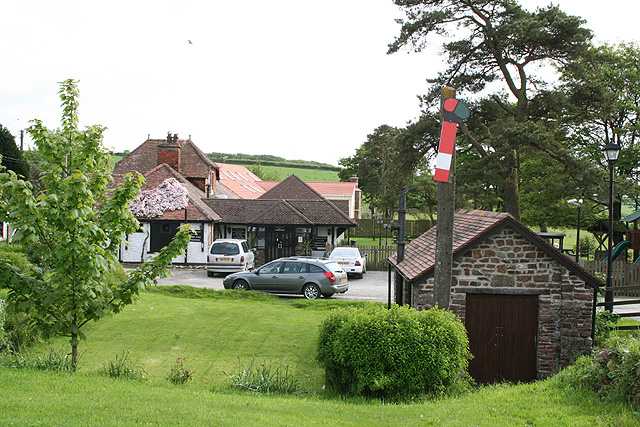
The former station which is now 'The Old Station Inn'

Blackmoor Gate, the western gateway to Exmoor National Park, sits on the watershed between tributaries of the rivers Yeo and Heddon nearly 305 m (1000 ft) above sea level. It has long been a crossing of tracks — an ancient ridgeway following the former moorland ridge from the heights of Exmoor down to the sea at Mortehoe. The road from Lynton to Barnstaple crosses here at a low point of the ridge, as did the former Lynton & Barnstaple Railway. The former station is now 'The Old Station Inn' — a licensed restaurant.

Until the middle of the 19th century, open moorland ran to the east of the road between here and Parracombe with a gate onto the moor at this point. The name does not come from that of the Blackmore family - who owned the Manor of Court, Parracombe Churchtown. The land at Blackmoor Gate was owned by the Nott Pyke-Nott family and was part of the Manor of Rowley.
