= Miriam Hyde =

Australian composer, musician and writer (1913–2005)

Dr. Miriam Hyde AO OBE
- Born: Miriam Beatrice Hyde; 15 January 1913; Adelaide, South Australia
- Died: 11 January 2005 (aged 91); Sydney, Australia
- Education: Elder Conservatorium of Music, Adelaide; Royal College of Music, London
- Occupations: pianist, composer, teacher, educator
- Known for: Her compositions and contribution to Australian music education

Miriam Beatrice Hyde AO OBE (15 January 1913 – 11 January 2005) was an Australian composer, classical pianist, music educator, and poet.

She composed over 150 works for piano, 50 songs, other instrumental and orchestral works and performed as a concert pianist with eminent conductors including Sir Malcolm Sargent, Constant Lambert, Georg Schnéevoigt, Sir Bernard Heinze and Geoffrey Simon. She also had books of poetry published, and wrote an autobiography.

== Life ==
Hyde was born in Adelaide, a daughter of Clarence and Muriel Hyde (née Gmeiner) of Torrens Park. Music was an important part of her family life: her mother played and taught piano; her aunt, Clarice Gmeiner, played violin, viola and harp with the South Australian Symphony Orchestra; and her younger sister, Pauline, played violin and sang. Her early music lessons were provided by her mother, but in 1925 she won a scholarship to attend the Elder Conservatorium of Music in Adelaide.

After graduating with her Bachelor of Music degree in 1931, she won an Elder Overseas Scholarship to the Royal College of Music in London, which she attended from 1932 to 1935. Her teachers were R. O. Morris and Gordon Jacob for composition, and Howard Hadley and Arthur Benjamin for piano. She won several composition prizes while at the college, including the Cobbett Prize. However, during this time she also suffered a nervous collapse, and her mother went to England to be with her.

Hyde gave her first London recital at Holland Park in 1933, and in 1934 her Piano Concerto No. 1 in E-flat minor was performed by the London Philharmonic Orchestra, conducted by Leslie Heward with her as soloist. In 1935, she performed Beethoven's Piano Concerto No. 4 under Malcolm Sargent, and her own Piano Concerto No. 2 with the London Symphony Orchestra conducted by Constant Lambert. She saw many of the great musicians of the time, including Rachmaninoff, Stravinsky, Prokofiev, Yehudi Menuhin and Elisabeth Schumann.

She returned to Adelaide in 1936 and soon after moved to Sydney, where she worked for several decades as a composer, recitalist, teacher, examiner and lecturer. It was here that she also met her husband, Marcus Edwards, whom she married in 1939 and with whom she had two children, Christine (1950) and Robert (1951). During the war years, while her husband was interned as a German prisoner of war after being captured on Crete, she taught in Adelaide, returning to Sydney at the end of hostilities. Her monumental Sonata in G minor for piano (1941–44) is very much a reflection of the war years.

Major works from the post-war period included the Happy Occasion Overture (1957), the Kelso Overture (1959), Sonata for Clarinet (1949), String Quartet in E minor (1952), Sonata for Flute (1962) and her two trios for winds and piano (1948, 1952). One of her most famous works is the piano piece Valley of Rocks (1975).

Her work for the Australian Music Examinations Board (AMEB) spanned the years 1945–82, including her valuable contribution on the advisory board for New South Wales. Her activities included examining, mentoring, demonstrations and workshops, setting/reviewing/marking exam papers, advising on syllabus content.

She also wrote educational materials – books of sight-reading, examples of forms, aural tests for all grades, tutor books including one for adult beginners.

Her life in music was supplemented by her poetry. She wrote close to 500 poems, some of which she set to music.

In 1981 she was made an Officer of the Order of the British Empire (OBE) and in 1991 was made an Officer of the Order of Australia (AO). She was awarded an honorary doctorate by Macquarie University in 1993, and in 2004 she received an award for Distinguished Services to Australian Music at the Australasian Performing Right Association and Australian Music Centre Classical Music Awards.

She was appointed Patron of the Music Teachers' Association of South Australia (MTASA) and established the Miriam Hyde Award for the Association. After serving on the Council of the Music Teachers' Association of New South Wales from 1960 to 1991, she was made its patron.

In 1991 her autobiography was published, titled Complete Accord.

She celebrated her 80th birthday in 1993 by giving a series of recitals throughout the country. At the age of 89, she gave her last performance of her Piano Concerto No. 2, with the Strathfield Symphony Orchestra conducted by Solomon Bard. Her 90th birthday in 2003 was marked with concerts and broadcasts throughout Australia.

From the mid-1990s onwards, continuing after her death in 2005, The Keys Press (Perth) and Wirripang Pty Ltd (Wollongong) published more than 100 of her manuscripts for piano, chamber music and voice.

Hyde died on 11 January 2005, a few days before her 92nd birthday.

== Music ==
Hyde's compositions include works for orchestra, piano concertos, art songs, chamber music, many piano solos, flute solos and more. She wrote in an early 20th-century pastoral style, achieving a highly effective combination of impressionism with post-romanticism.

One well-known piece is the piano solo Valley of Rocks, written in 1975. The Piano Concerto No. 1 in E-flat minor (1933), Piano Concerto No. 2 in C-sharp minor (1935) and Village Fair (1943) for orchestra are the most broadcast of her works. Her Sonata in G minor (1944) is another notable work.

One of her lesser known pieces is the mystical Reflected Reeds (1956) with its rippling chords sketching the Sydney landscape on a brooding afternoon.

Her husband died in 1995 and she ceased writing music at that time.

Recording – Romantic Piano Trios – Trio Anima Mundi (Divine Art dda25102) (2013)

- feat. Fantasy for piano trio

== Writing ==
The expression of words in a poetic form meant as much to Hyde as the expression of music. In an interview filmed in 1992 she revealed that it was often a matter of chance whether her impressions would be embodied in words or in music.

Three selections of her poetry were published by the Economy Press, Adelaide: The Bliss of Solitude (1941), A Few Poems (1942) and Dawn to Dusk (1947?). She also wrote her autobiography, Complete Accord (1991, Currency Press) and donated the royalties to the Elder Scholarship that she won in 1931.
