= Woody Bay railway station =

Former railway station in Devon, England

Coordinates: 51.20167°N 3.88718°W

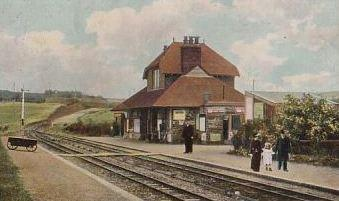
An early view of Woody Bay station

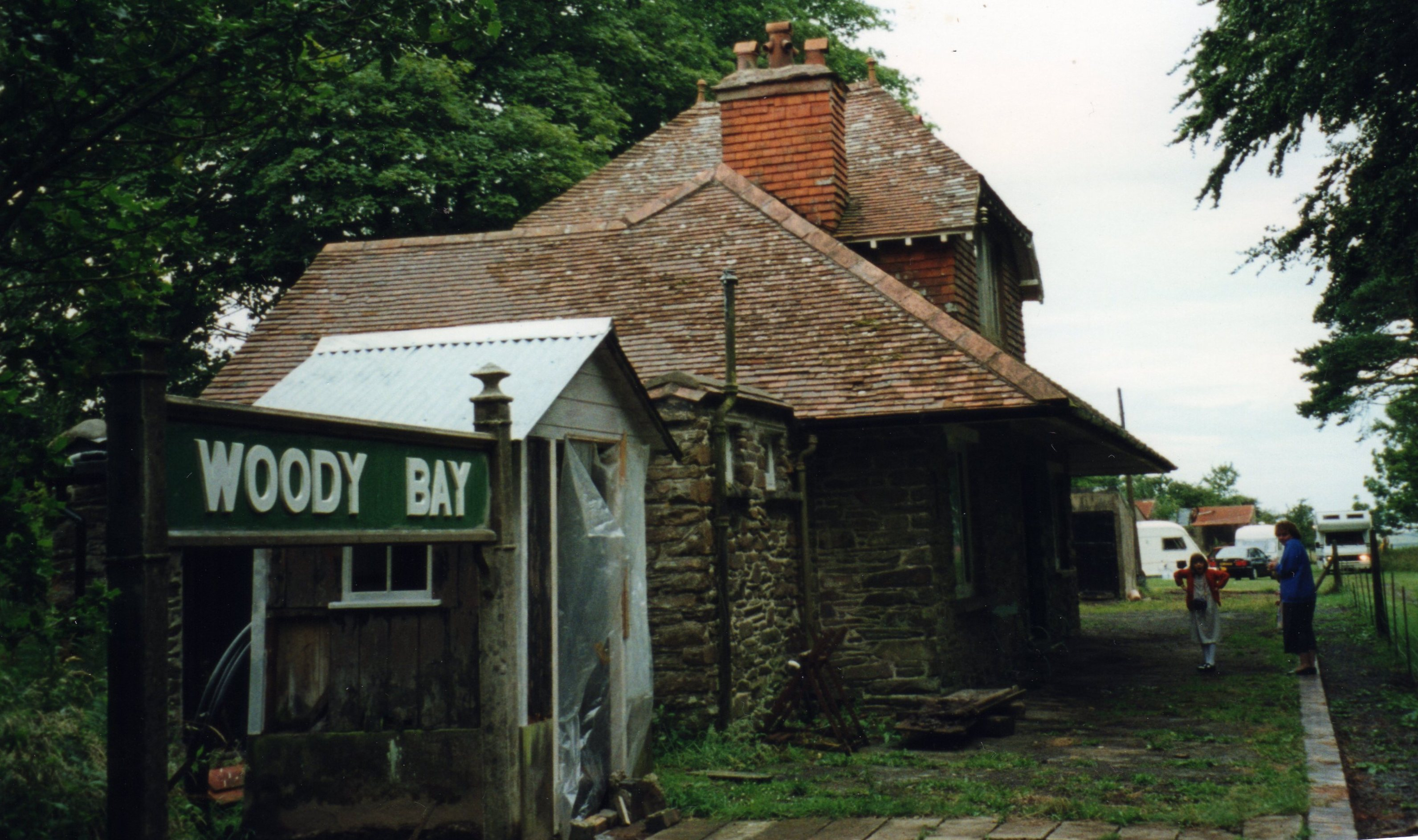
The platform viewed in 1996, restoration of the signal box is underway

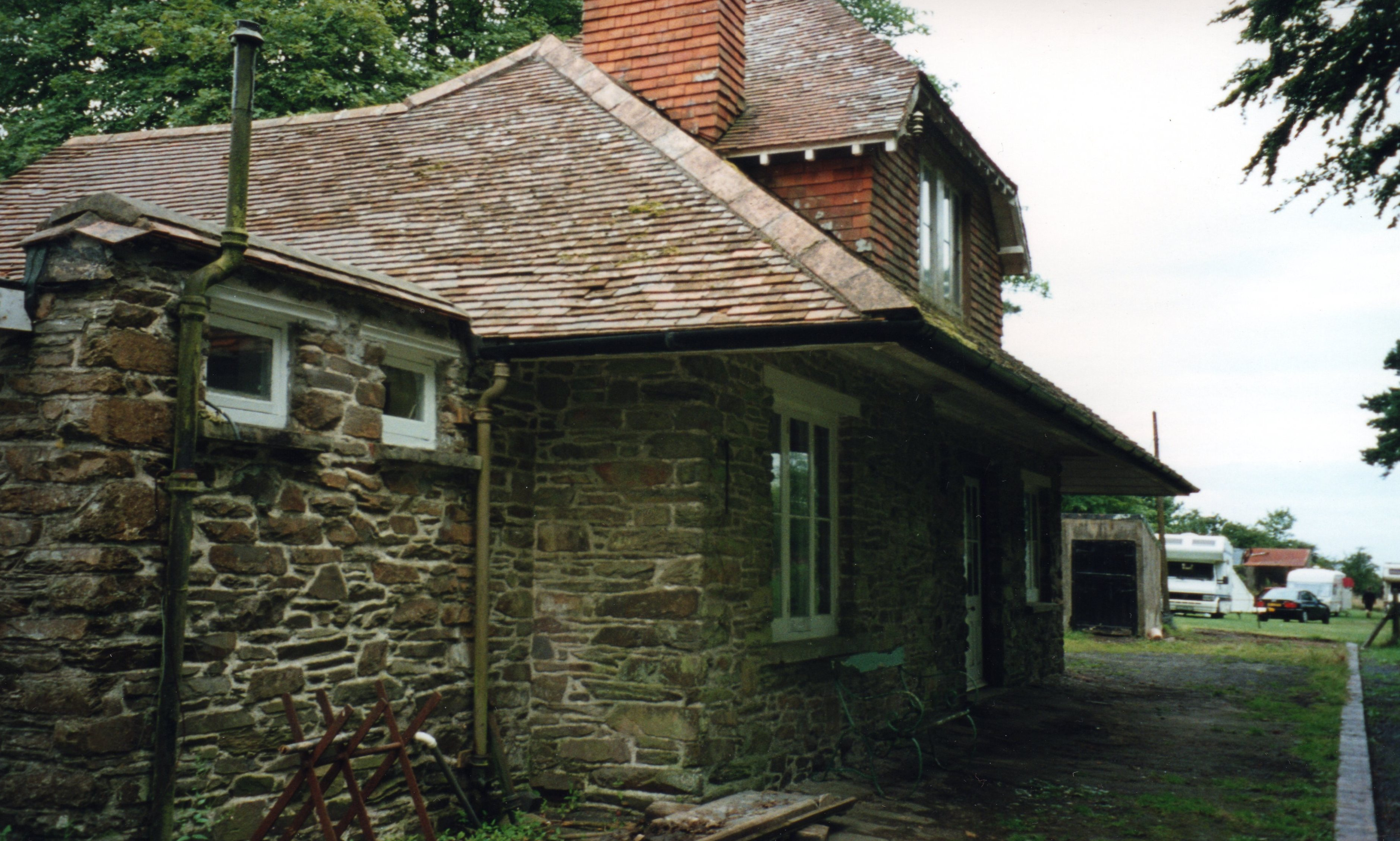
Detail of the station building, 1996. The trackbed was, at the time, not in railway hands.

Woody Bay, within the Exmoor National Park, is a station on the former Lynton and Barnstaple Railway, a narrow gauge line that ran through Exmoor from Barnstaple to Lynton and Lynmouth in North Devon. The station was situated inland, about 1 1/2 miles from Woody Bay itself.

== History ==
It opened with the line (as Wooda Bay until the name was changed in 1901) on 11 May 1898. The station building was designed by Jones of Lynton in a similar style to Lynton Town Hall.

Woody Bay station was built in part to serve the expected development of a resort at Woody Bay, a mile or so to the north. A pier was built in the bay, although little further development took place, and the pier was destroyed by heavy seas before any trade could be established with passing steamers, and the development was abandoned when the promoter went into liquidation in 1900, and although a route was surveyed for a branch line to the bay, it was never constructed.

From 1923 the line was operated by the Southern Railway. It closed on 30 September 1935.

Following purchase by the Lynton and Barnstaple Railway Company in 1995, restoration of the station began, and it opened as a Visitors' Centre in 2003. An "out and back" service over a few hundred yards of track began in 2004, and with the opening of a temporary station at Killington Lane about a mile towards Parracombe Halt, a regular "point to point" service started in 2006.

Several trees have grown in the intervening years, but these two photos, taken over a hundred years apart, are still recognisably from the same location (except being taken from opposite sides of the building and different ranges). The carriage shed built into the cutting beyond the station is a portable structure erected in 2003.

In September 2025 it was one of seven railway-associated buildings which were grade II listed in the week of the bicentenary of the Stockton and Darlington Railway. English Heritage recognises it for its architectural and historic interest, describing it as "the best-surviving example of a station building on the Lynton & Barnstaple Railway ... the building retains a good proportion of historic fabric both externally and within the stationmaster's accommodation ... the station's architectural design is neat and accomplished" and mentioning its association with George Newnes.

Preceding station	Heritage railways	Following station
Killington Lane	Lynton and Barnstaple Railway (2004-)	Terminus
	Disused railways	
Parracombe Halt	Lynton and Barnstaple Railway (1898-1935)	Caffyns Halt
