= Lynton and Lynmouth railway station =

Former railway station in Devon, England

Coordinates: 51.22371°N 3.83581°W

Lynton & Lynmouth
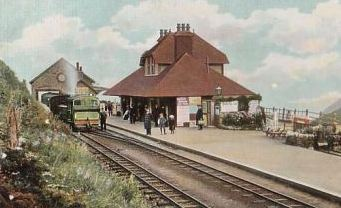
- The station in the early 1900s

General information
- Location: Exmoor, North Devon; England
- Grid reference: SS71904877
- Platforms: 2 (1 through, 1 bay)

Other information
- Status: Disused

History
- Original company: Lynton and Barnstaple Railway
- Pre-grouping: Lynton and Barnstaple Railway
- Post-grouping: Southern Railway

Key dates
- 11 May 1898: Opened
- 30 September 1935: Closed
Location

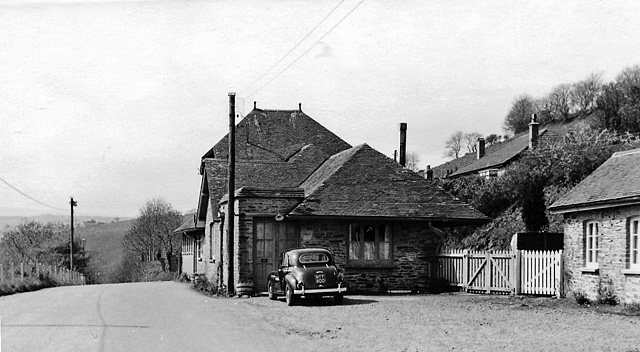
The station in 1960

Lynton and Lynmouth railway station was the terminus of the Lynton and Barnstaple Railway, a narrow gauge line that ran through Exmoor from Barnstaple to Lynton and Lynmouth in North Devon, England. The station served the twin towns of Lynton (on the top of the cliffs) and Lynmouth (on the shoreline below).

== History ==
It opened with the line on 11 May 1898. Originally providing accommodation for the stationmaster and his family, the station building was substantially updated under Southern ownership, including removal of the chimney stacks. A separate house was built for the stationmaster on the rising ground to the West of the main line, and rail access to the engine shed was reversed at around the same time. The water supply was very poor in this location often causing the toilets and water tower for the locomotives to be closed. Due to this trains often stopped at Parracombe Halt to fill the water tanks of the engine.

From 1923 the line was operated by the Southern Railway. It closed on 30 September 1935.

Now within the Exmoor national park, the station building has become a private residence. A number of private residences have been built close to the trackbed on the approaches to the former station.

The rebuilt L&BR is planned to terminate at a new station on a different site from the original.

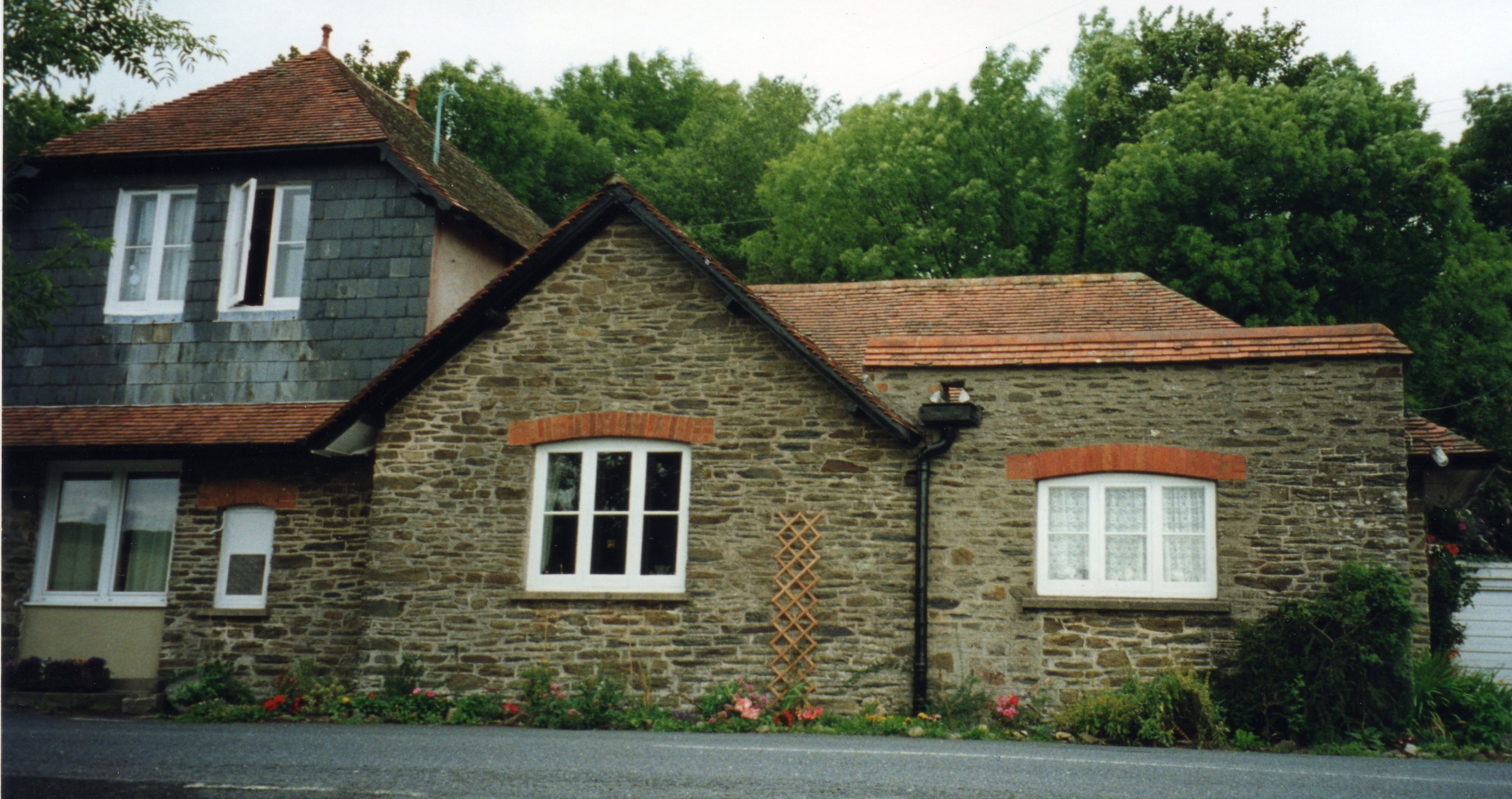
The station building - now a private home - from the road, in 1996

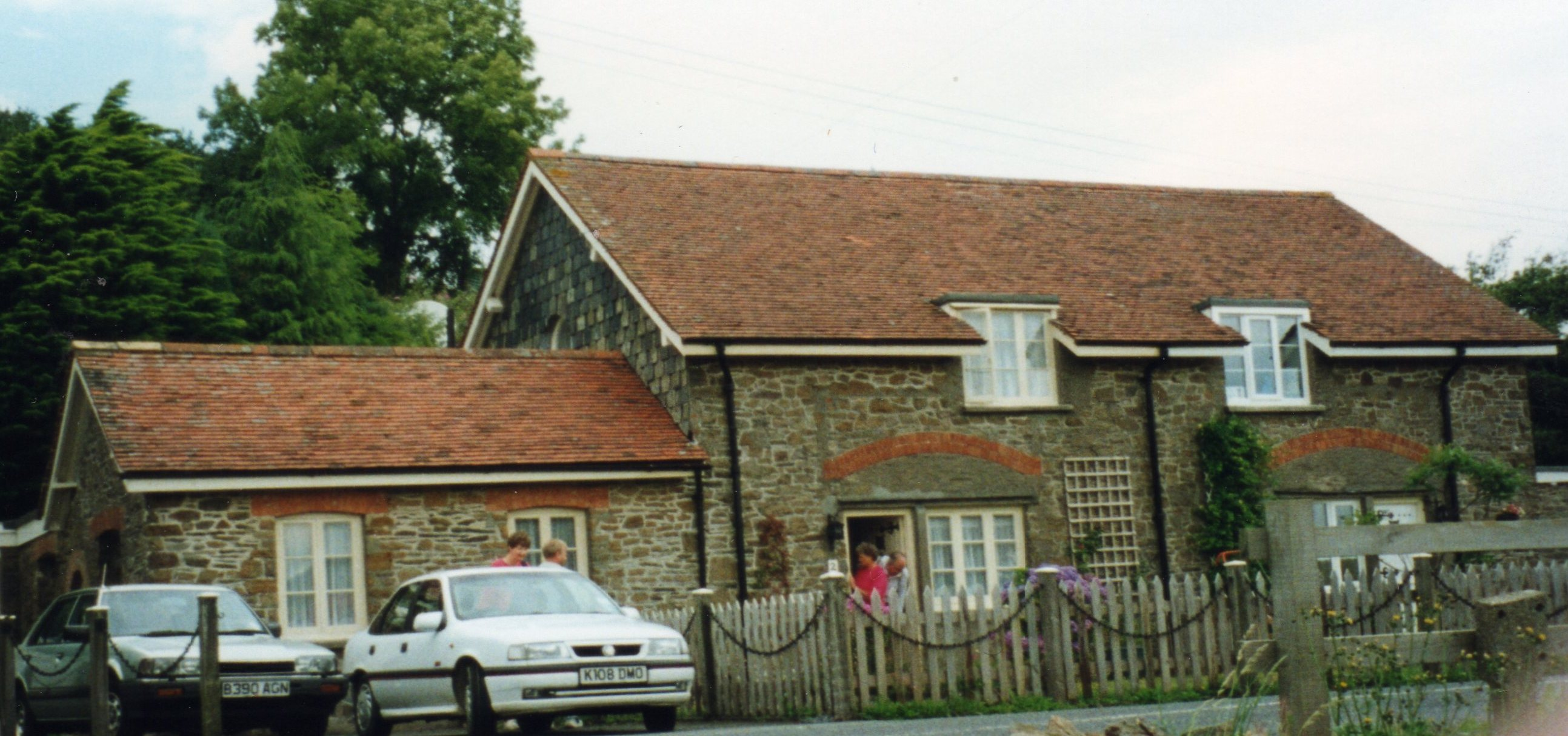
The Lamp Room and Goods Shed - since converted into two private homes - seen in 1996

Preceding station	Disused railways	Following station
Caffyns Halt	Lynton & Barnstaple Railway (1898-1935)	Terminus
