= Lee Abbey =

Ecumenical Christian community

Coordinates: 51.2278°N 3.8663°W

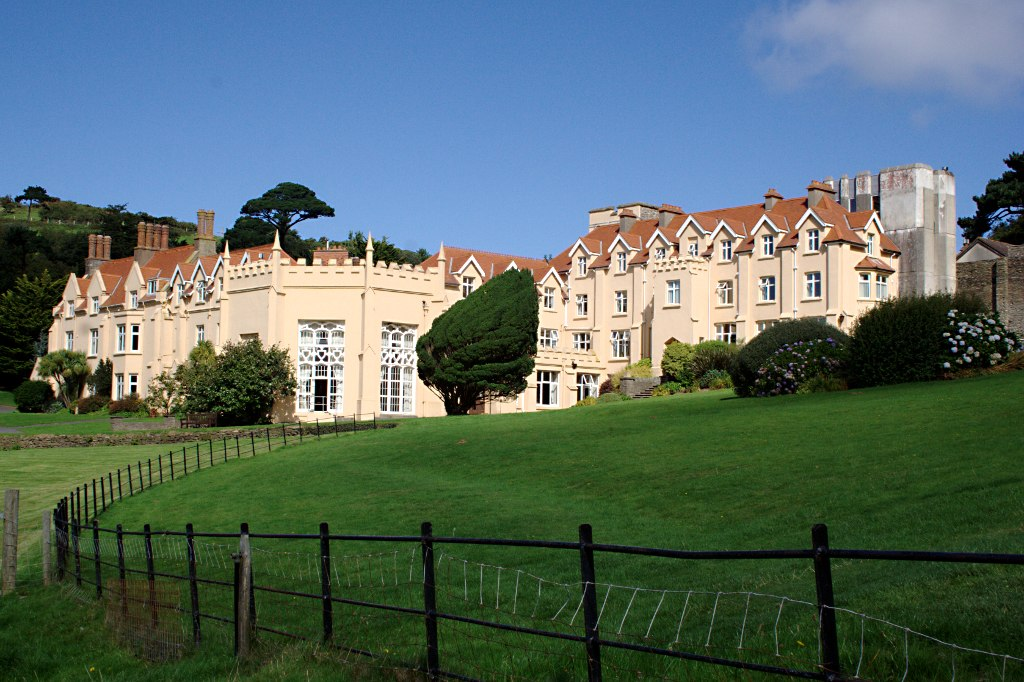
Lee Abbey in 2010

Lee Abbey, founded in 1946, is an ecumenical Christian community between Woody Bay and Lynmouth in Devon, England. It is a Grade II listed building.

The first building on the site may have been a farmhouse built by Cistercian abbots of Forde Abbey around 1200. The current Gothic Revival buildings are from the 1850s. In the 1920s it was bought and used unsuccessfully as a hotel. During World War II a boys' school was evacuated to Lee Abbey. After the war the dilapidated buildings were bought for use as a Christian retreat, and extensive building work has taken place from the 1950s to the present day.

The site now offers retreats, group weekends and Christian family holidays. The community also has accommodation in London.

There is a beach with parking (a small donation is required), and there are wash rooms, a tea shop (not open Sundays or during the winter) and an occasional shop.

== History ==
The earliest record of the site currently occupied by Lee Abbey is in the Domesday Book of 1086, in which it is recorded as "Ley". The first known ownership dates to 1199 when Henry de Tracey, a Norman knight, gifted the land to the community of Cistercian monks based at Forde Abbey in Somerset. It is not known what the monks used the land for, but it is likely they built a farmhouse close to where the abbey now stands, and it may have been used as a tenanted farm.

By the 17th century, the land had passed into the possession of Hugh de Wichehalse, a member of a large Devon family originally based at Wych, near Chudleigh. De Wichehalse was a resident of Barnstaple, and his maternal grandfather had been mayor of the town, but he left with his family following a bubonic plague epidemic in Barnstaple and nearby Bideford in 1627, settling in the farmhouse at the site of Lee Abbey, then known as the "Grange Farm of Lee". De Wichehalse made extensive renovations and extensions to the farmhouse, which is described in the Exmoor National Park historical environment record as "a farm house with gabled ends and a gabled long porch in the centre with two long benches in the thickness of the walls inside, all roofed with thatch". The de Wichelsea family remained at Lee for around eighty years, Hugh being buried at the Lynton parish church on his death and his son John taking over the farmhouse. According to a 19th-century tale written by Lynton vicar Matthew Mundy, entitled the "Story of Jennifred", the De Wichelhases in 1685 made an alliance with the Duke of Monmouth in his failed rebellion against King James II, and then perished at sea after being pursued by the king's forces. In fact, they remained at Lee until 1713, but by that time they could no longer afford to live there, and they lost the estate.

A large landslide resulted in the loss of 9 acres (3.6 ha) of the estate to the sea in 1785, when it was under the ownership of a John Clarke. The house and lands began to fall into disrepair in the early 19th century, until being bought by a land agent and surveyor named Charles Bailey, who had built a successful business in a range of property-related functions, including as a government expert witness, and was based at Nynehead in Somerset. In around 1850, Bailey replaced the old farmhouse with the modern building, which he constructed as a country house in the Gothic Revival style. He then renamed the estate to "Lee Abbey". Bailey died in 1858, and his son Charles F. Bailey took over the estate, remaining there until his own death in 1919.

After Bailey's death the estate was sold and converted into a luxury hotel and golf course. The house was extended during this period, with a new section including a dining room built on the south of the building. The hotel was not ultimately a success, as the Great Depression forced two separate owners into administration and it was eventually closed with the outbreak of World War II. During the war the Brambletye School in East Grinstead, Sussex, relocated its pupils and many of its staff to Lee Abbey, after its own buildings were taken over by the British Army following the Dunkirk evacuation. During the school holidays in 1943 and 1944, Roger de Pemberton, a clergyman, rented Lee Abbey for one of several religious house parties which he had been running for young people since before the outbreak of war.

When the school returned to Sussex after the war, de Pemberton decided to purchase the building outright for use as a Christian centre. It was in poor condition at the time, but after renovation the facility opened in 1946, with a ceremony by the Bishop of Exeter, and de Pemberton was its inaugural warden. In 1951, the community converted part of the north of the building into a chapel, and have made numerous other alterations over the subsequent decades including a beach chapel and a youth and activity centre, built in 2004 on the site of an old dairy barn. The building was designated as a Grade II listed building in 1973.
