= Roborough Castle =

Iron Age hill fort in Devon, England

Coordinates: 51.199°N 3.818°W

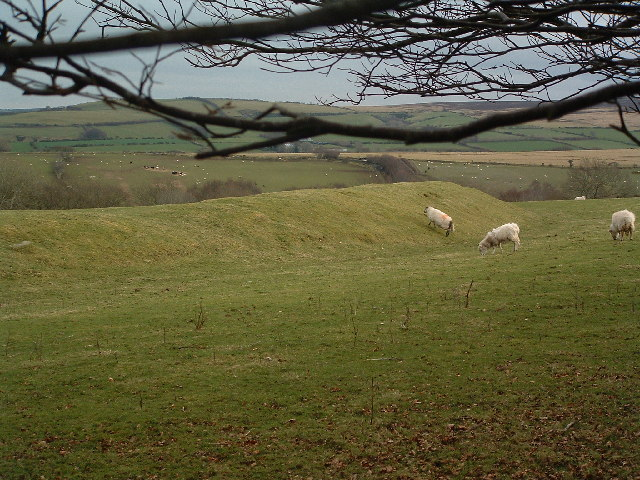
Site of Roborough Castle.

Roborough Castle is an Iron Age enclosure or hill fort situated close to Lynton in Devon, England. The fort is situated on the North East edge of a Hillside forming a promontory above a tributary to the East Lyn River known as Hoaroak Water at approx 320 Metres above Sea Level.
