= Lynton and Barnstaple Railway Trust =

The Lynton and Barnstaple Railway Trust (The Trust) is an educational charity supporting the rebuilding and operation of the railway by the Lynton & Barnstaple Railway Company, in North Devon, England.

== Objects ==
Working closely with its subsidiary the Lynton & Barnstaple Railway Company and other sister organisations, the Trust's charitable objectives are:

(1) To acquire preserve and restore for the public benefit items of historical, architectural, engineering or scientific value in connection with railways; and

(2) To advance the education of the public in the history sociology and technology of narrow-gauge railways and railways in general by the acquisition, restoration, preservation, creation and exhibition of railway locomotives, carriages, rolling stock, equipment, artefacts, documents and records, together with any appropriate land, buildings and structures in particular but not exclusively those of the former Lynton & Barnstaple Railway in Devonshire ('the railway') and to provide educational and training facilities to those engaged in the restoration and operation of the railway or railways general

== Membership ==
The Trust has over 2,000 members worldwide, with the majority coming from the UK.

Members receive a magazine three times a year with articles on the history of the Lynton and Barnstaple Railway and news of rebuilding the line and the restoration of locomotives and rolling stock, illustrated with historical and modern photographs, and evocative drawings and paintings recapturing the atmosphere of the line.

Members are also encouraged to help with construction, maintenance and operation of the railway, as well as publicity and fundraising activities. Several area groups have been formed around the country to publicise and raise funds for the Trust.

== History ==
=== Inspiration ===
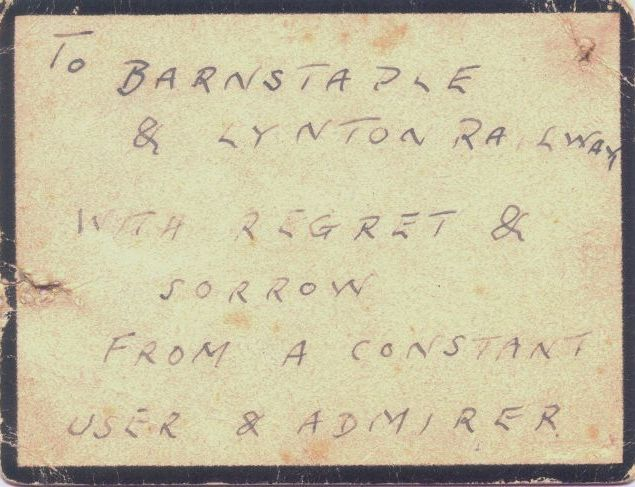
TO BARNSTAPLE & LYNTON RAILWAY WITH REGRET & SORROW FROM A CONSTANT USER & ADMIRER

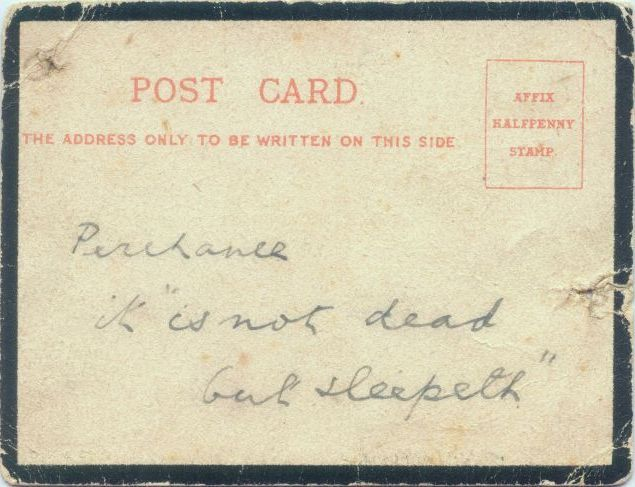
Perchance it "is not dead but sleepeth"

On 30 September 1935, the day after the Lynton and Barnstaple Railway closed, Barnstaple Town stationmaster Harold Ford and Porter Guard Walkey laid a wreath of bronze crysanthemums on the Barnstaple Station stop block.

The wreath bore a black-edged postcard, hand-written on both sides, sent by Paymaster Captain Thomas Alfred Woolf, R.N. (Retd.), of the White House Woody Bay. The Captain died on 12 May 1937, aged 55 and is buried in Martinhoe Churchyard not far from Woody Bay.

=== Action ===
Inspired by these few words, In 1979 a small group of enthusiasts met to form the Lynton & Barnstaple Railway Association with the intention of reopening part of the line within about 18 months. In fact, it took somewhat longer. Not until 1995 did the former station building at Woody Bay became available for sale, and following extensive negotiations, was purchased by the Lynton & Barnstaple Railway Company on behalf of the Lynton & Barnstaple Railway Association. Following further negotiations and purchase of other parts of the trackbed, Woody Bay is now the centre of operations for the restoration project. The former station at Chelfham is now also owned by the Railway Company.

The Association was absorbed into The Lynton & Barnstaple Railway Trust which was first registered with the Charity Commission for England and Wales on 22 September 2000.

== Finance ==
The Trust has to date received only a small amount of grant funding, the vast majority of income having been raised through the efforts of its members.

Financial History (Src: Charity Commission)
Financial Year	Gross Income	Total Expenditure
1 Jan 2014 – 31 Dec 2014	£361,696	£191,539
1 Jan 2013 – 31 Dec 2013	£403,813	£111,750
1 Jan 2012 – 31 Dec 2012	£272,323	£125,613
1 Jan 2011 – 31 Dec 2011	£201,693	£55,344
1 Jan 2010 – 31 Dec 2010	£115,996	£55,167
1 Jan 2009 – 31 Dec 2009	£82,289	£43,033
1 Jan 2008 – 31 Dec 2008	£165,432	£65,128
1 Jan 2007 – 31 Dec 2007	£229,545	£98,588
1 Jan 2006 – 31 Dec 2006	£64,744	£29,229
1 Jan 2005 – 31 Dec 2005	£44,771	£35,134
1 Jan 2004 – 31 Dec 2004	£44,753	£50,146
1 Jan 2003 – 31 Dec 2003	£85,662	£52,179
1 Jan 2002 – 31 Dec 2002	£51,887	£26,750
1 Jan 2001 – 31 Dec 2001	£51,887	£26,750
25 Jul 2000 – 31 Dec 2000	£28,640	£4,926

The Trust, the Railway Company, Area Groups, and various volunteers, run The L&B Project, researching, restoring, rebuilding and operating the railway.

Woody Bay station reopened in 2004 and the line was extended in 2006. Trains now run on a two-mile round trip over the original route within Exmoor National Park above the Heddon Valley near Parracombe.

Each September, at the Annual Steam Gala, a wreath of bronze chrysanthemums is carried on the pilot loco, and afterwards, laid on Captain Woolf's grave in remembrance, and in gratitude for his inspirational words.

== See also ==
- Lynton and Barnstaple Railway
- Lynton and Barnstaple Railway Co. Ltd. The Operating company associated with the rebuilding of the modern L&B.
