= Lynton =

Town in Devon, England

Coordinates: 51.229°N 3.837°W

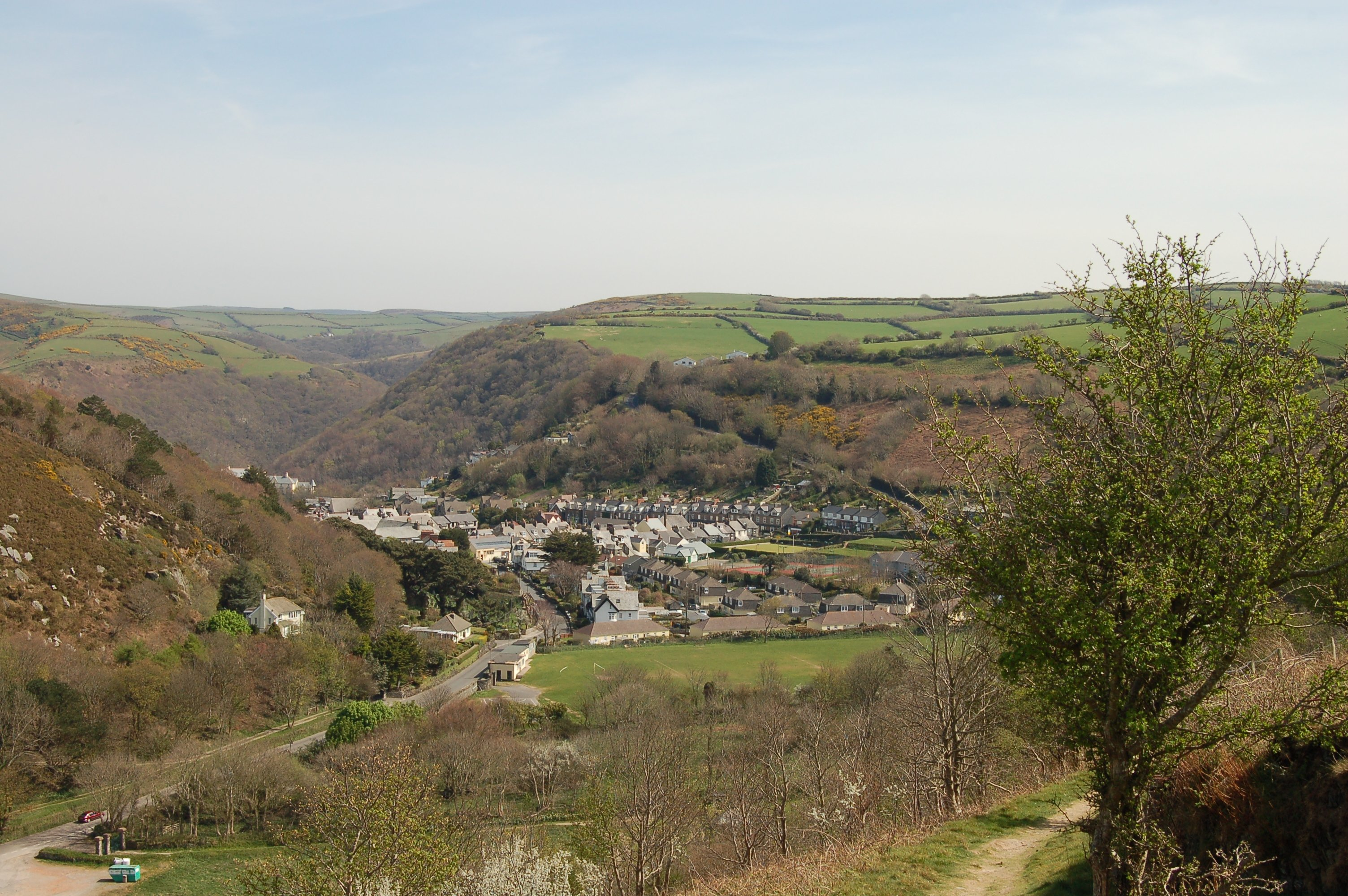
- Lynton from Southcliff Hill

- Location within Devon
- Population: 1,157 (2011 Census)
- OS grid reference: SS718495
- Civil parish: Lynton and Lynmouth
- District: North Devon
- Shire county: Devon
- Region: South West
- Country: England
- Sovereign state: United Kingdom
- Post town: Lynton
- Postcode district: EX35
- Dialling code: 01598
- Police: Devon and Cornwall
- Fire: Devon and Somerset
- Ambulance: South Western
- UK Parliament: North Devon

Lynton is a town on the Exmoor coast in the North Devon district in the county of Devon, England, approximately 17 miles (27 km) north-east of Barnstaple and 18 miles (29 km) west of Minehead, and close to the confluence of the West Lyn and East Lyn rivers. Lynton sits directly above the neighbouring village of Lynmouth; the two settlements are separated by a steep gorge.

== Governance ==
Lynton is part of the Lynton and Lynmouth electoral ward whose total ward population at the 2011 census was 1,647. The two communities are governed at local level by Lynton and Lynmouth Town Council.

== Location and geography ==
The two settlements are connected by the Lynton and Lynmouth Cliff Railway.

The South West Coast Path and Tarka Trail pass through, and the Two Moors Way runs from Ivybridge in South Devon to Lynmouth. The Samaritans Way South West runs from Bristol to Lynton and the Coleridge Way from Nether Stowey to Lynmouth.

The Valley of Rocks and Wringcliff Bay are 0.5 miles (0.80 km) to the west.

== History and buildings ==
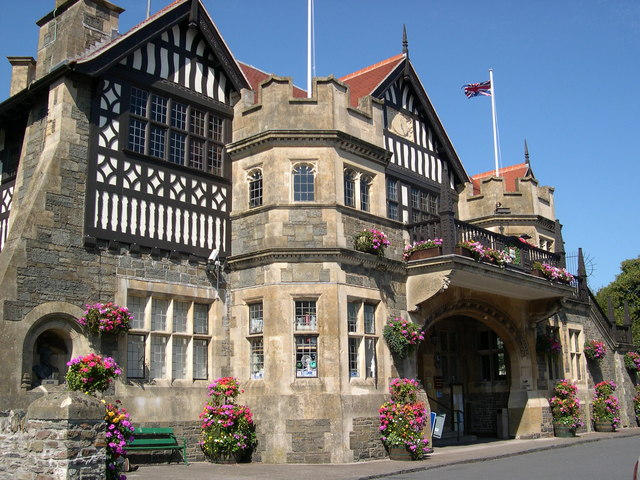
Lynton Town Hall

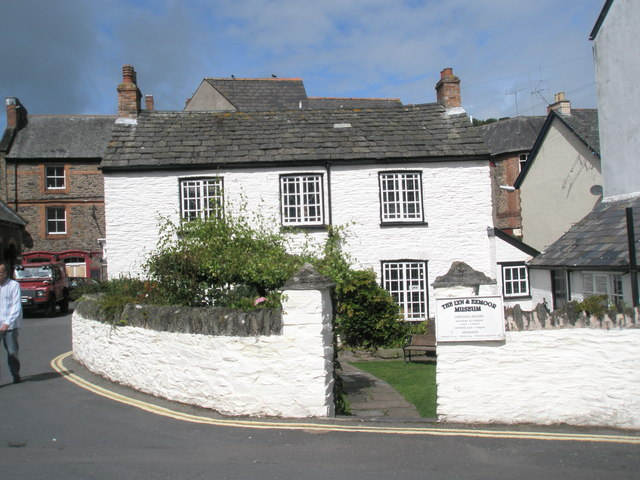
The Lyn and Exmoor Museum

Evidence of Iron Age activity can be found at the nearby Roborough Castle.

Lynton's Parish Church of St Mary, stands overlooking the sea, surrounded by shops and hotels. The tower is mainly 13th century but the church itself has been enlarged and altered — most notably in 1741 and in late Victorian/early Edwardian times.

Many of the town's buildings were constructed in the latter part of the 19th century and the early 20th century. Lynton Town Hall was given to the town by Sir George Newnes, Bart., a major benefactor of the town; it was opened on 15 August 1900. He also gave the town the United Reformed Church building (originally a Congregational church) on Lee Road.

== Twinning ==
Lynton and Lynmouth are jointly twinned with Bénouville in France.

== Transport ==
Lynton was once the terminus for the narrow-gauge Lynton & Barnstaple Railway, which served both towns.

As of September 2020, Lynton is served by the following bus services:

- 309/310 Lynton & Lynmouth - Barnstaple (Stagecoach SW, previously Filers Travel)

== Sport ==
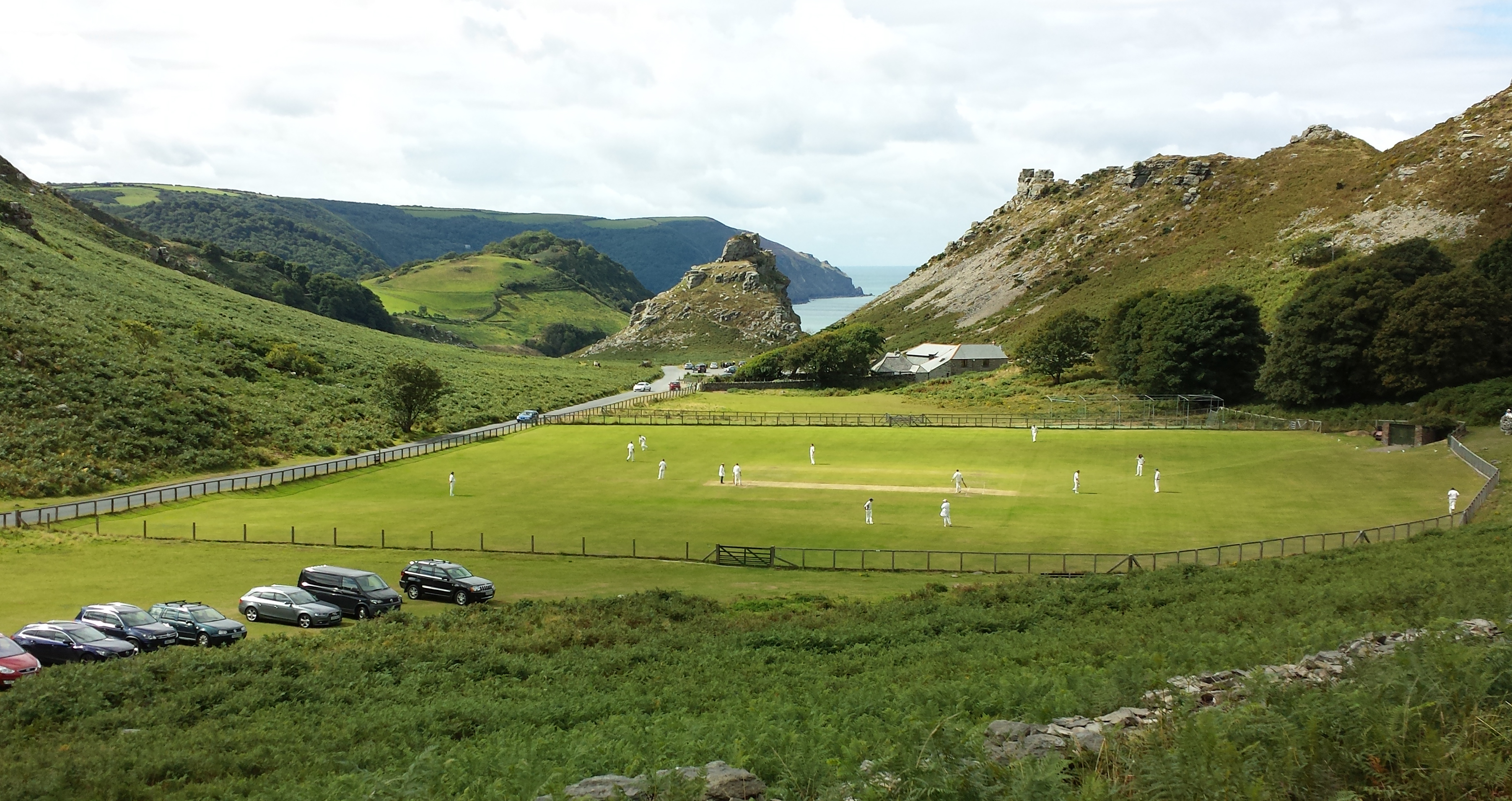
Lynton & Lynmouth Cricket Club

The Lynton & Lynmouth Cricket Club, founded in August 1876, meet at the Valley of Rocks.

== Notable people ==
- Leslie McLean (1918–1987), cricketer
