= Accott =

Historic estate in Devon, England

Coordinates: 51°4′32″N 3°56′22″W

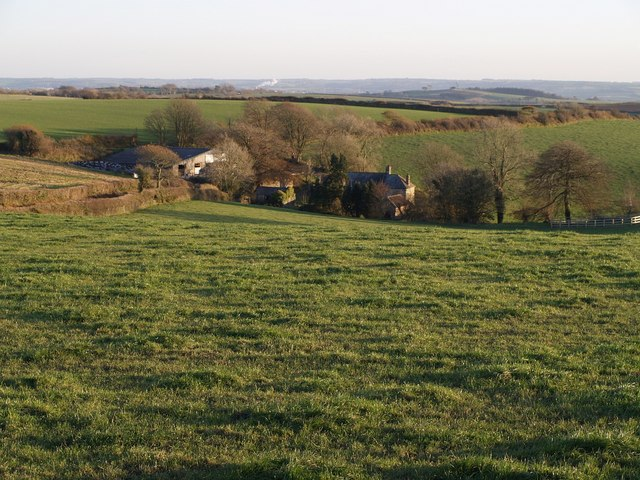
Accott.

Accott is an historic estate, now a small settlement, in the parish of Bishop's Tawton in the county of Devon, England

== History ==
The place-name Accott is reputed to have come from an Anglo-Saxon landowner called Acca, who "once owned a sizeable estate in this district", thus "Acca's Cott" (Acca's farmstead) (See List of generic forms in place names in Ireland and the United Kingdom). He also owned nearby Acland, Landkey, 3 miles to the west, the original seat of the prominent Acland family, which manor's name signifies "Acca's lane". Persons with this name living in the 8th century included three bishops in the Anglo-Saxon Church: Acca of Dunwich (8th century), Acca of Hereford (8th century) and Acca of Hexham (b c. 660 - 740 or 742), or Saint Acca.

The mansion house at Accott has a Grade II listed private chapel. it is believed to date from the 12th century. The house became derelict in the 1950s. The chapel is located at the western end of the house and was used for Roman Catholic services when the Giffards lived there in the late 16th century following the Dissolution of the Monasteries. The senior branch of the Giffard family was seated at nearby Brightley in the adjoining parish of Chittlehampton. The estate comprised several farms and formed part of the manor of Bishop's Tawton, held in-chief by the Bishop of Exeter. A document states that Accott was held by Richard Cotell from a feudal overlord named Drogo de Lington in 1127 after his ancestors were granted the estate by a Bishop of Exeter. Alice Cotell gave it in exchange for a sore goshawk 150 years later and a life annuity to John Giffard, whose family owned it for a further 100 years.

In 1890 cannonballs were found embedded in the wall by workmen during repairs to the house. They indicate that Accott may have been the scene of a battle, probably during the Civil War (1642–1651). It was then sold by three sisters and joint-heiresses who had inherited the estate following the death of their two brothers who killed each other in a quarrel. For a further 300 years the prominent Chichester family of Hall (in the same parish) owned the farm up until the early 20th century. The Chichester estate had to sell Accot in order to pay Estate Duty. Both farms were bought by the Lee family, who used the house for storage.
