= Bishop's Tawton =

Village in Devon, England

Coordinates: 51°03′08″N 4°02′48″W

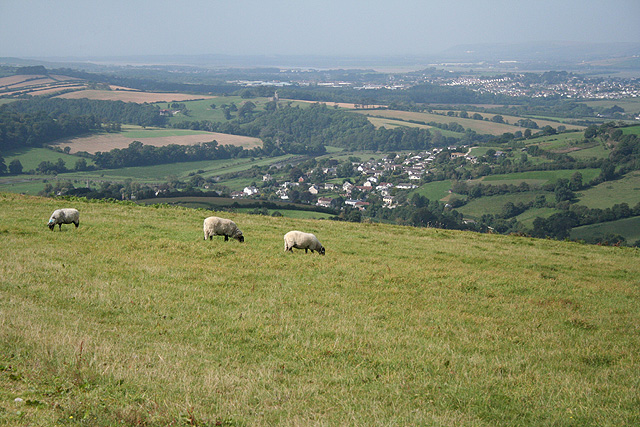
- Bishop's Tawton (centre), viewed from Codden Hill

- Location within Devon
- Population: 1,176 (2001 census)
- Civil parish: Bishop's Tawton
- District: North Devon
- Shire county: Devon
- Region: South West
- Country: England
- Sovereign state: United Kingdom
- Police: Devon and Cornwall
- Fire: Devon and Somerset
- Ambulance: South Western

Bishop's Tawton is a village and civil parish in the North Devon district of Devon, England. It is in the valley of the River Taw, about three miles south of Barnstaple. According to the 2001 census the parish had a population of 1,176.

The monument on Codden Hill to Caroline Thorpe, the wife of the local MP Jeremy Thorpe; she died in a car crash in 1970

== Description ==
The spire of St John the Baptist church in the village is 14th century. Within the church, the baptismal font is Norman and there survive several mural monuments to the Chichester family of Hall.

Several sources dating from the 16th and 17th centuries record that the see of the first bishop for Devon (a diocese created by dividing the Diocese of Sherborne in the early 10th century) was at Tawton (later named Bishop's Tawton) in 905, though certainly by 909 the see was at Crediton. (In 1050 the see moved to Exeter.) Any link between a possible 10th-century former bishop's church/cathedral and the extant Church of St John the Baptist is conjectural. The case for a brief bishopric at Tawton is far from proved, but there are remains of a modest bishop's "palace" at Court Farm, next to the parish church. This residence was used for centuries by the diocesan bishops, until Tudor times, and the parish was a bishop's peculiar.

There is a pillar on Codden Hill to Caroline Thorpe, the wife of the local MP Jeremy Thorpe; she died, aged 32, on 29 June 1970 in a car accident. The monument, designed by Clough Williams-Ellis, was dedicated on 4 December 1971 by the Archbishop of Canterbury and the Bishop of Crediton.

Notable residents included Clara Codd, the suffragette and theosophist, who was born in Pill, Bishop's Tawton in October 1877.

== Historic estates ==
- Newport, an ancient borough.
- Hall, a seat of the Chichester family.
- Pill, a seat of the Chichester family.
- Accott, a seat of the Giffard family.
