= Church of St John the Baptist, Bishop's Tawton =

Church in Devon, England

Coordinates: 51°03′08″N 4°02′53″W

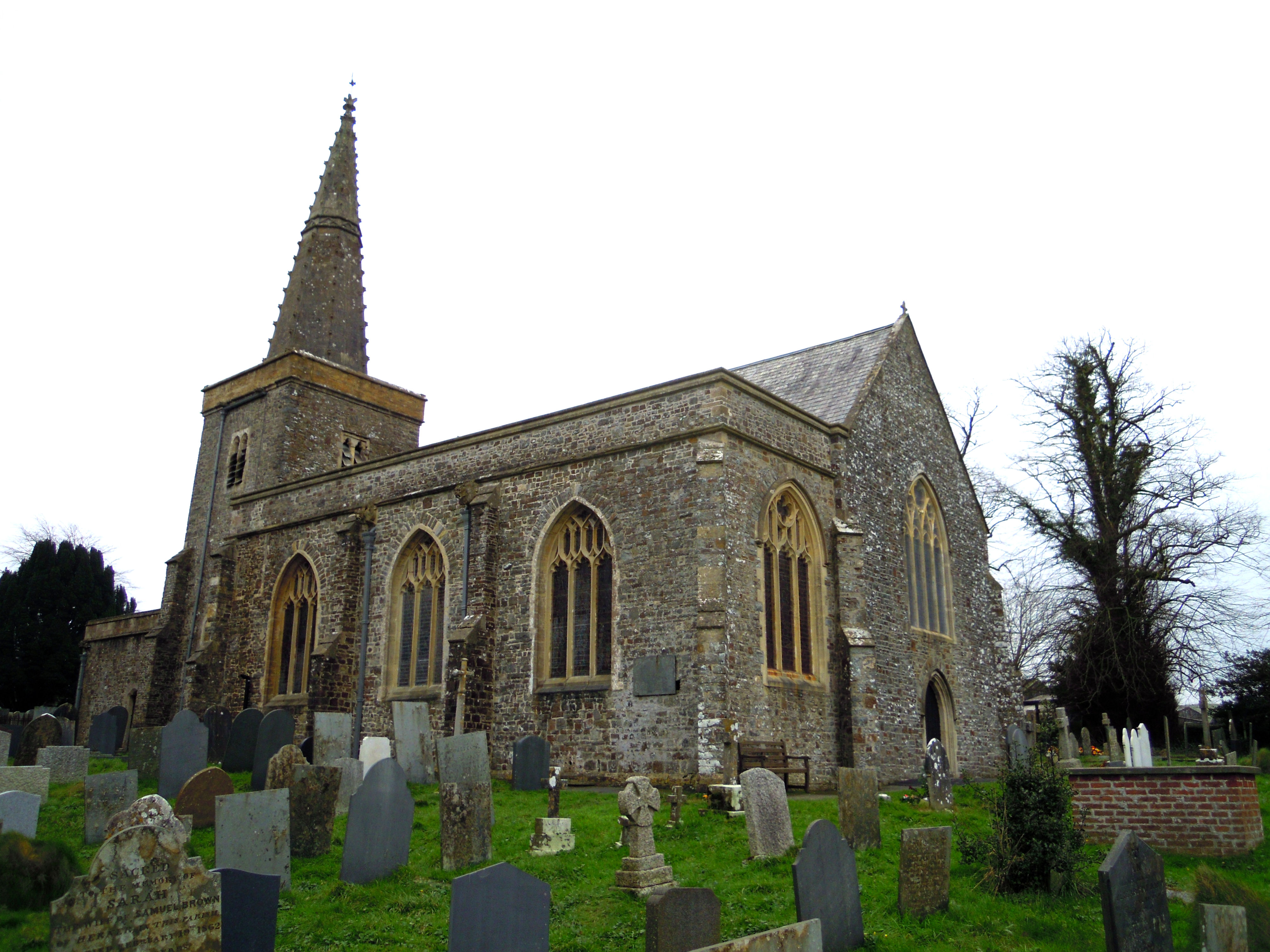
The Church of St John the Baptist in Bishop's Tawton

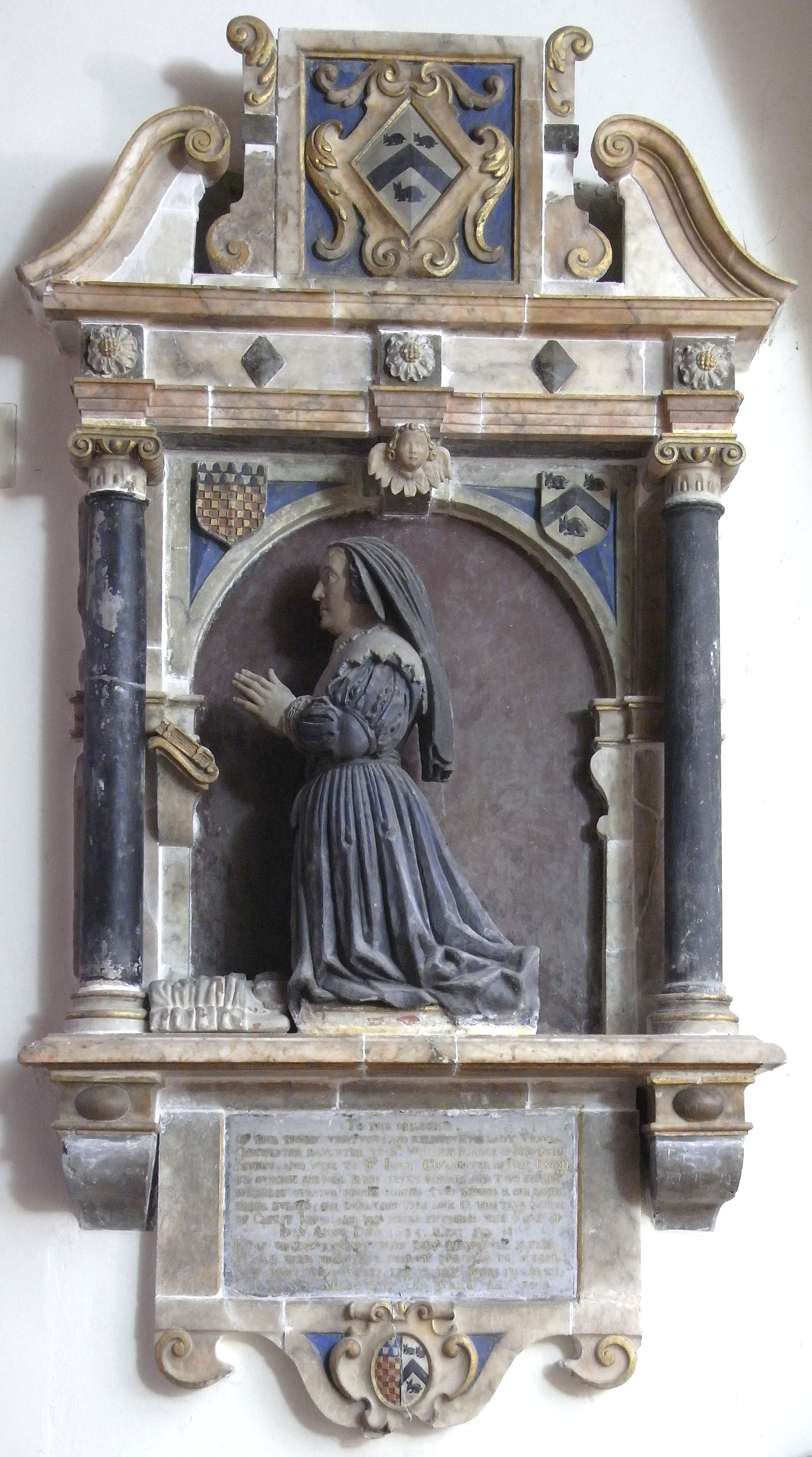
Monument to Lady Ursula Chichester (died 1635)

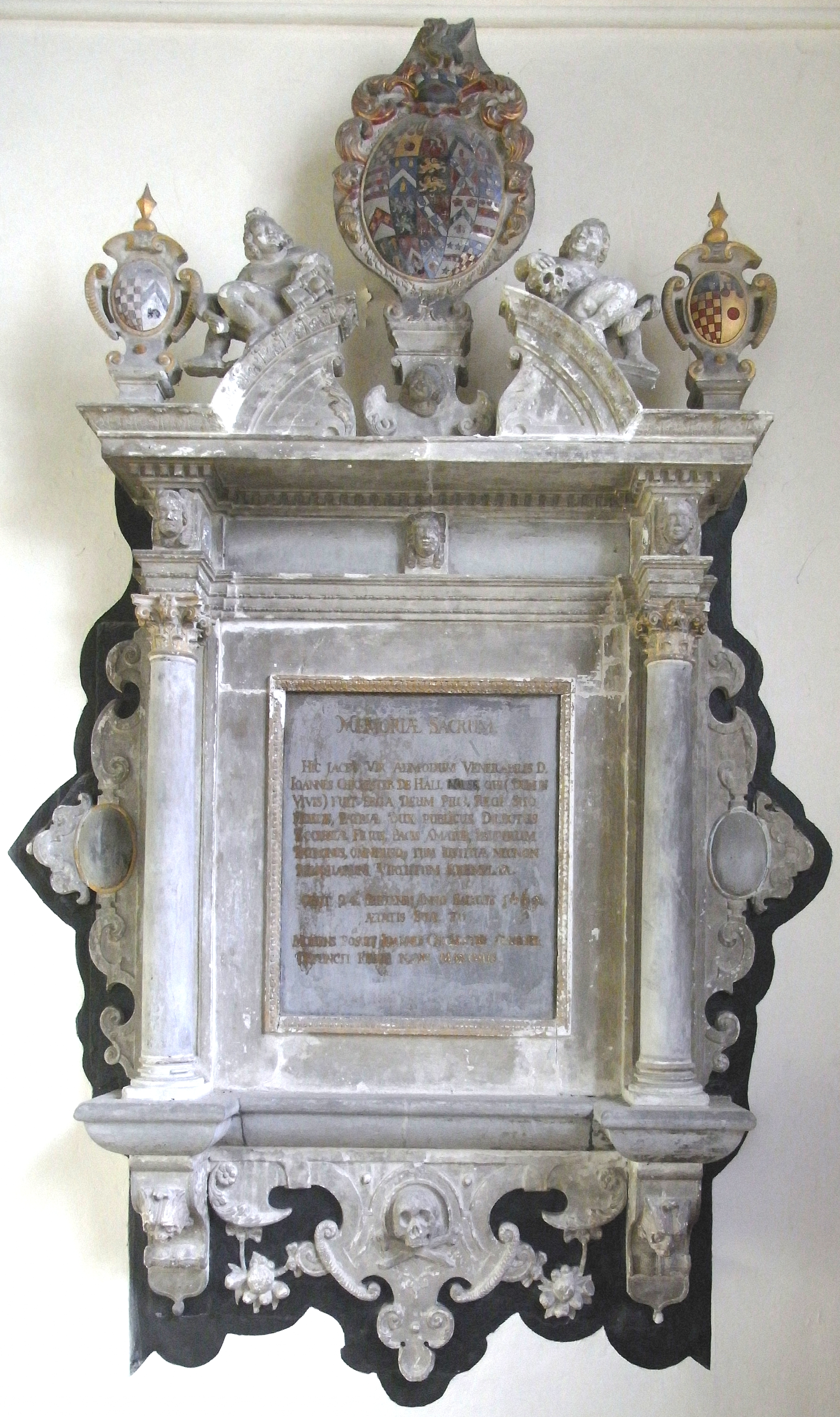
Memorial to Sir John Chichester (died 1669)

The Church of St John the Baptist is the Anglican parish church for the village of Bishop's Tawton in Devon. The church has been a Grade I listed building since 1965 and comes under the Diocese of Exeter.

== History ==
Several sources dating from the 16th and 17th centuries record that the see of the first bishop for Devon (a diocese created by dividing the Diocese of Sherborne in the early 10th century) was at Tawton (later named Bishop's Tawton) in 905, though certainly by 909 the see was at Crediton. (In 1050 the see moved to Exeter.) Any link between a possible 10th-century former bishop's church/cathedral and the extant Church of St John the Baptist is conjectural. The case for a brief bishopric at Tawton is far from proved, but there are remains of a modest bishop's "palace" at Court Farm, next to the church. This residence was used for centuries by the diocesan bishops, until Tudor times, and the parish was a bishop's peculiar.

== Building ==
This small church is built of stone rubble, roughly coursed to the north aisle and with squared rubble to the chancel and ashlar dressings. The tower and probably also the nave are 14th-century with the latter being remodelled in the 15th century when the north aisle was added. The north aisle was restored in 1849, the chancel was rebuilt in 1864 while further general restoration took place between 1878 and 1882, all by local architect R.D. Gould. The remainder of the present building is mostly 15th-century and was built on the site of a medieval chapel. The tower is unique in Devon in that it has a crocketed 14th-century octagonal spire. The first recorded Rector was John de Okehampton in 1285, though nothing remains of the church building from this time. Over the years numerous improvements have been made including adding a south doorway, a choir vestry, a brass eagle lectern, stained glass windows and a 19th-century Bath stone pulpit. The nave is separated from the aisles by three bays with leaf capitals and an additional half bay which opens into the tower. The rood screen is 15th-century and not well preserved. The baptismal font is 18th-century. The reredos consists of glazed tiles in "robust Victorian colours".

The adjacent war memorial is a Grade II listed building. Carved in dressed granite, it is a copy of St Martin's Cross in Iona in Scotland and is dedicated to the members of the Bishop's Tawton Parish who died in World War I; it was unveiled and dedicated by the Revd. P.L. Nicholas in September 1920.

== Monuments and memorials ==
There are some very fine memorials to the Chichester family of Hall in Bishop's Tawton. In the chancel is that of Lady Ursula Chichester (died 1635) depicted as the usual kneeling figure. The memorial to the infant daughter of Charels (sic) and Rose Dart (1652) has a tiny effigy of the swaddled child beneath the inscription. Other memorials include those to Sir Francis Chichester (1628–1698), Sir John Chichester (1598–1669), and a tomb slab in a recess to Anna Chichester (died 1644).

== Gallery ==
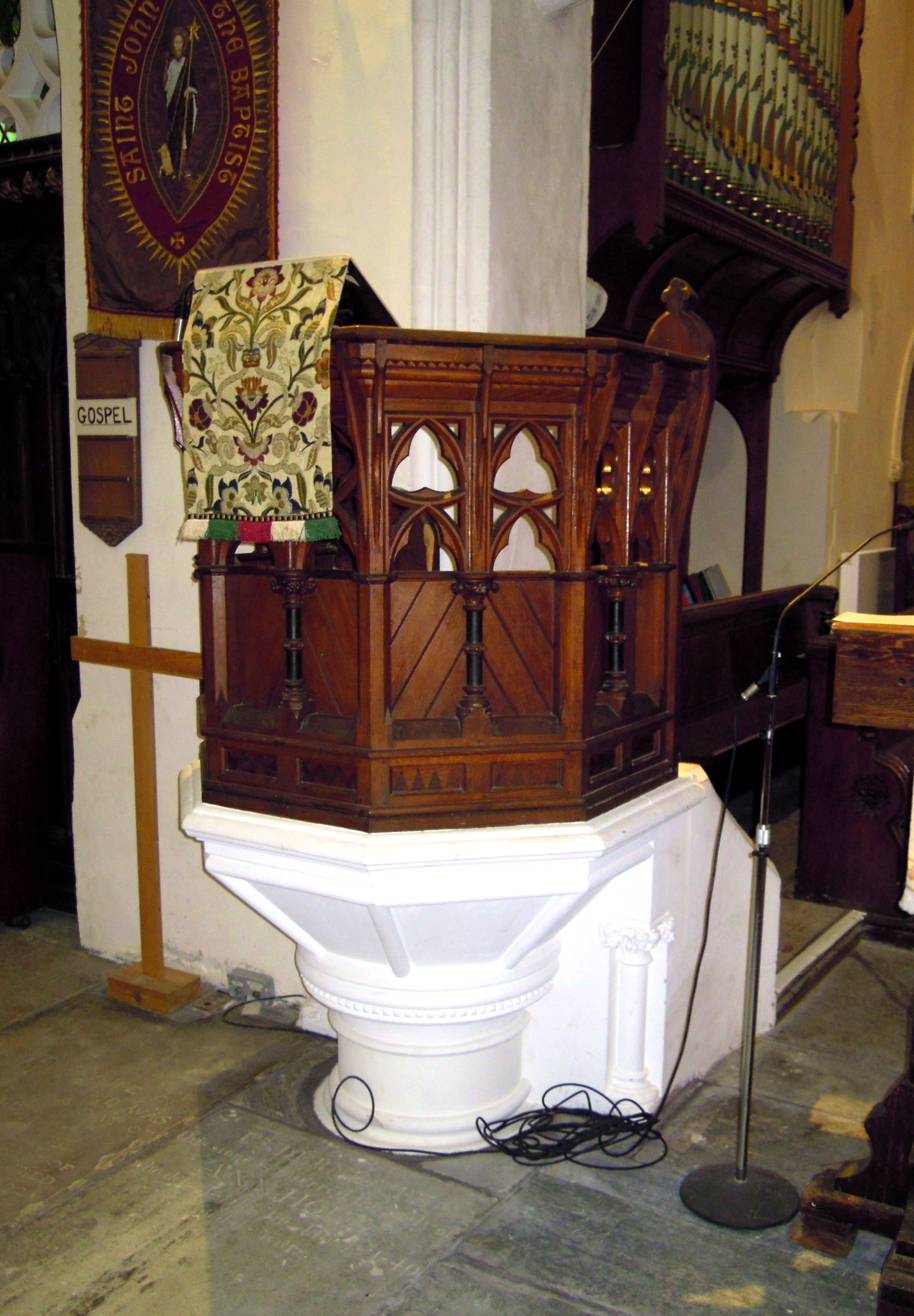
The pulpit is 19th-century

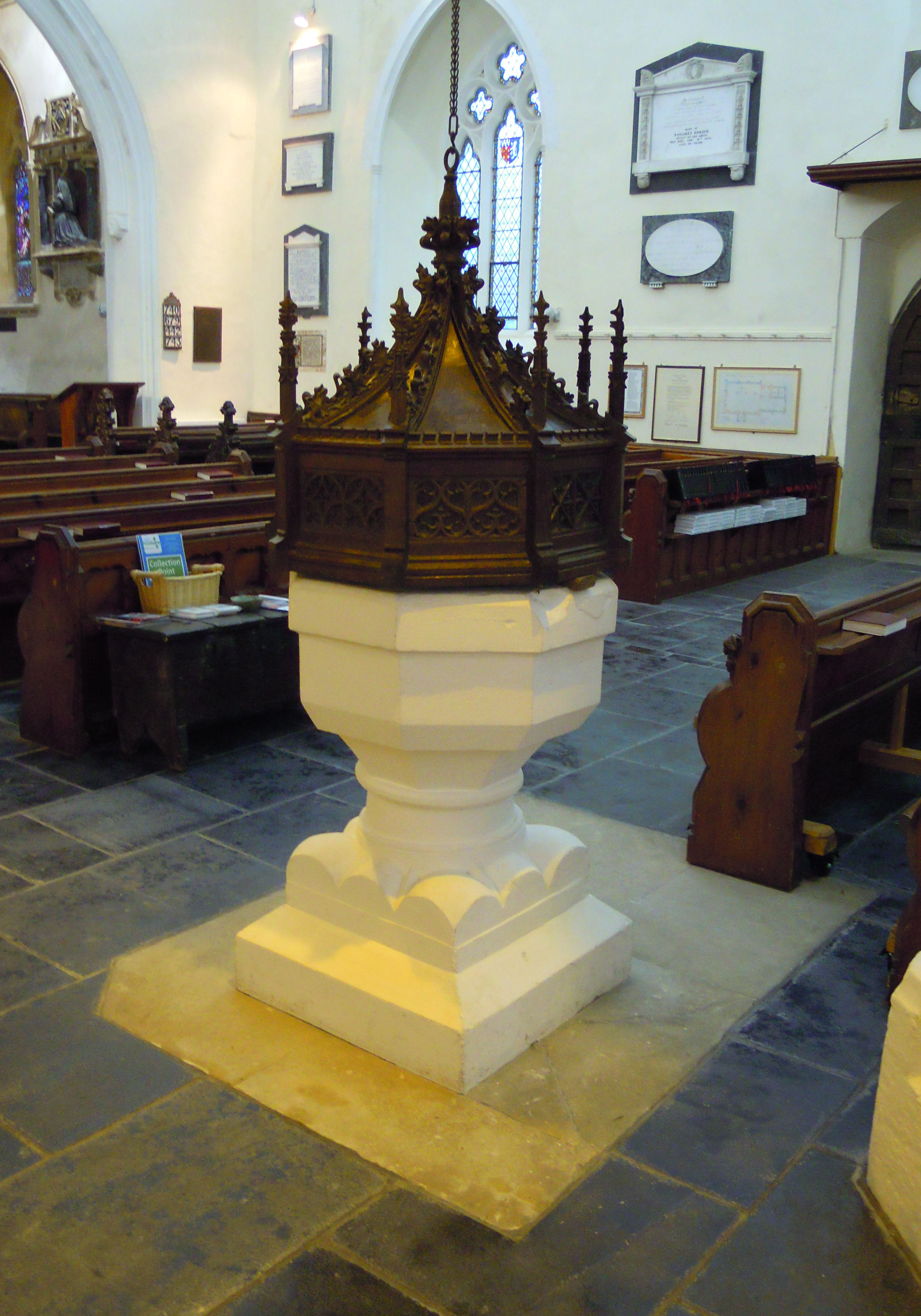
The 18th-century baptismal font

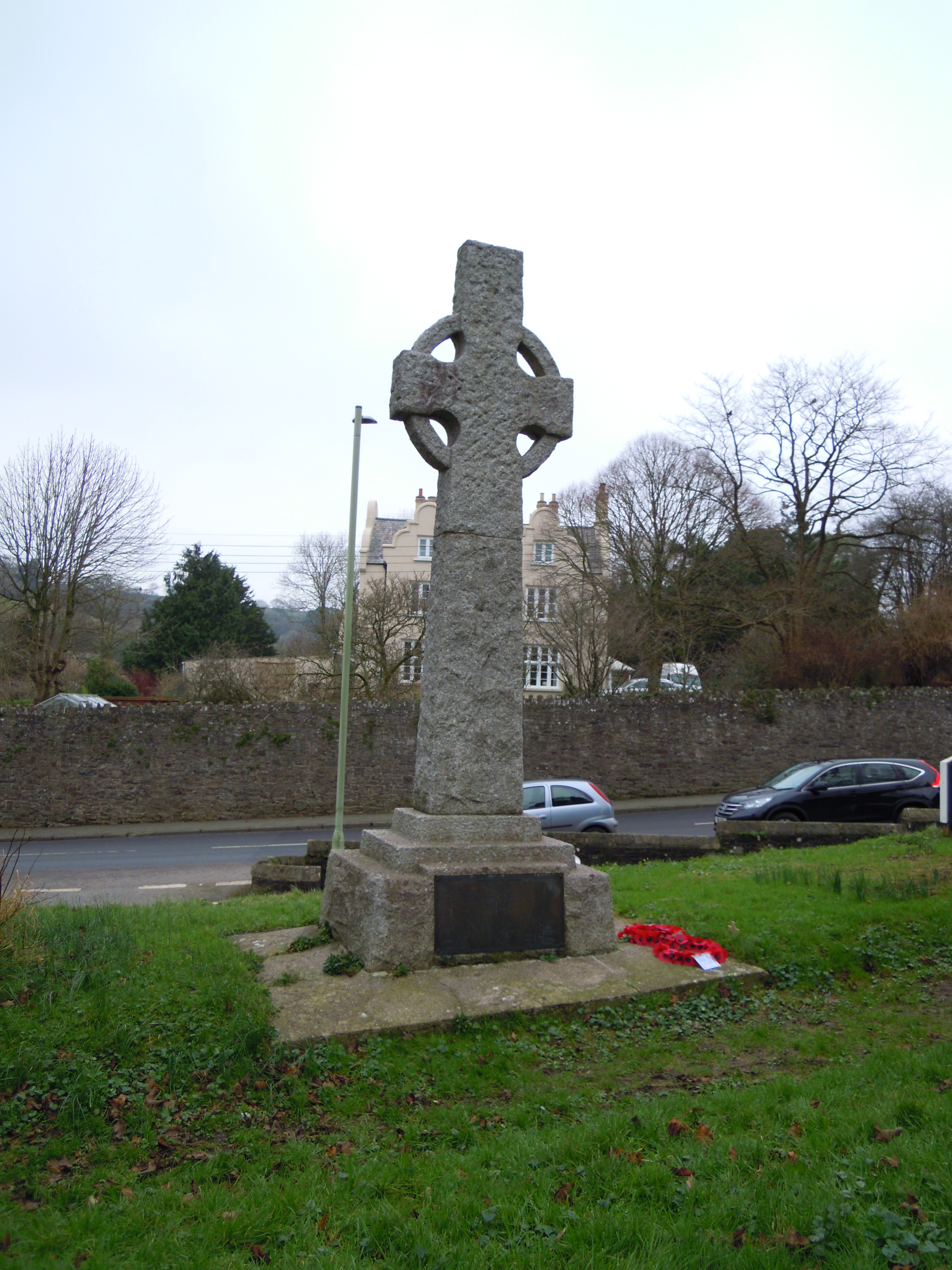
The war memorial is Grade II listed and was dedicated in 1920

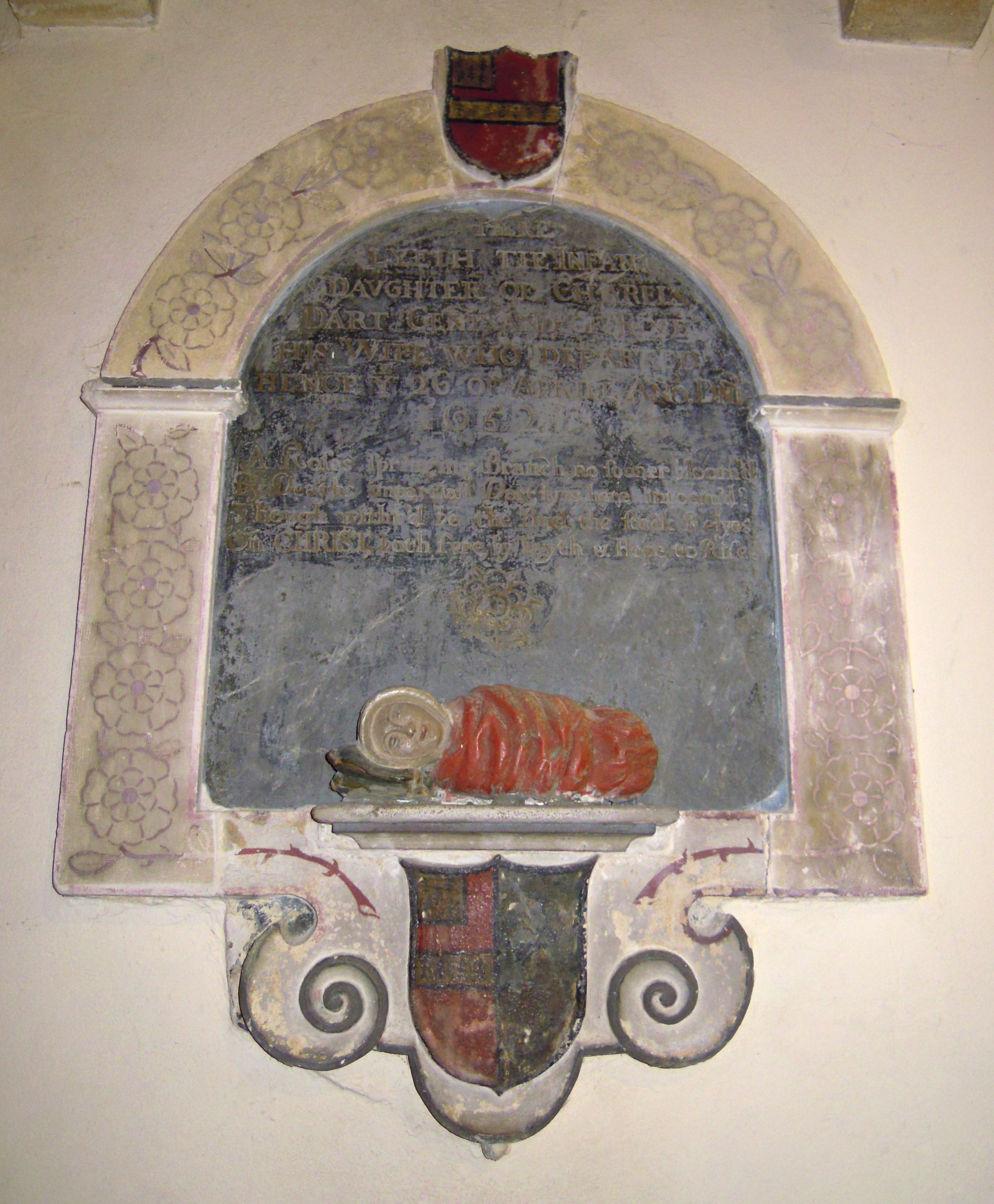
The Dart Memorial (died 1652)

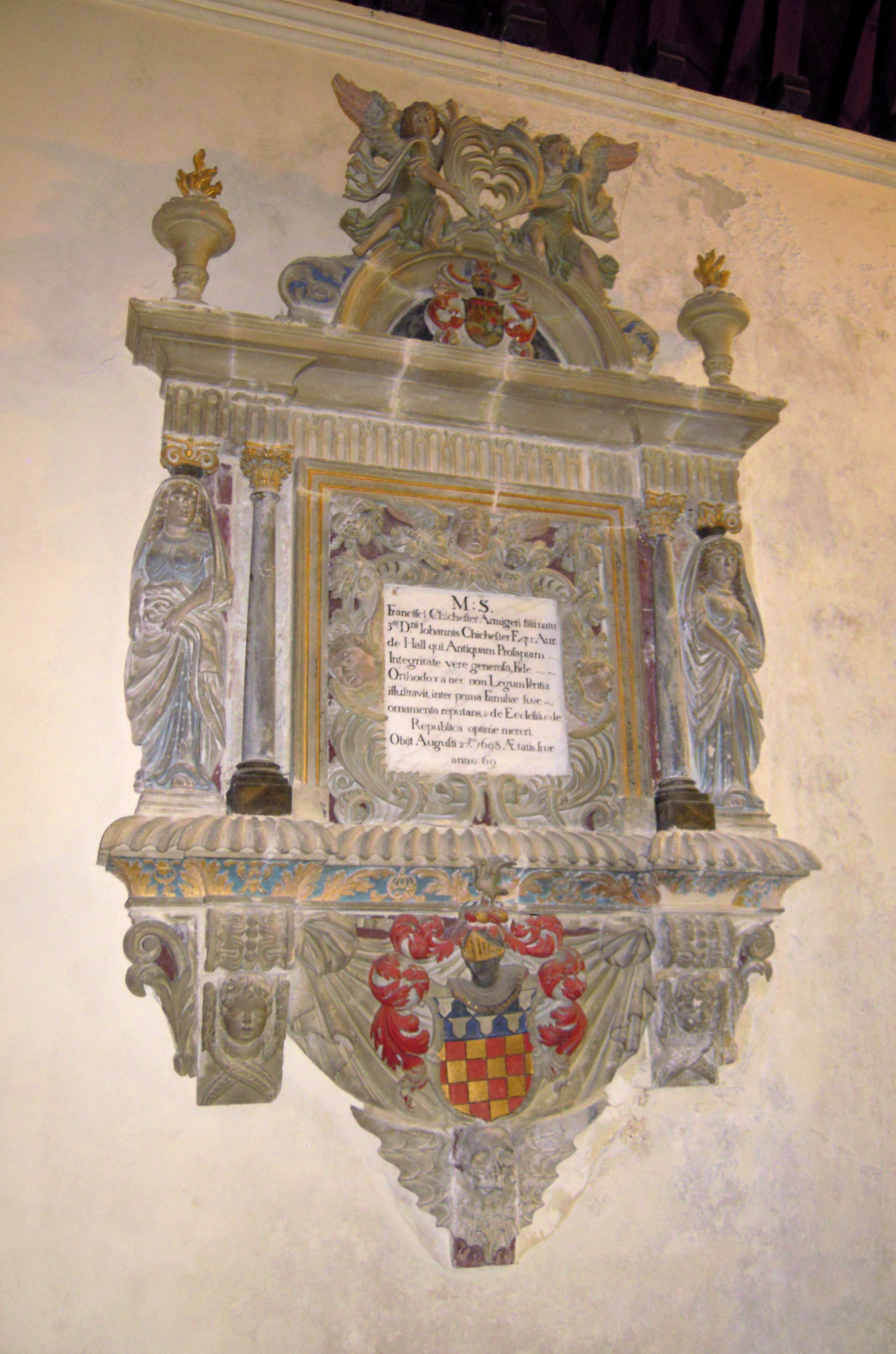
The memorial to Sir Francis Chichester (died 1698)
