= Newport, Devon =

Suburb of Barnstaple, England

Coordinates: 51.071°N 4.046°W

Newport
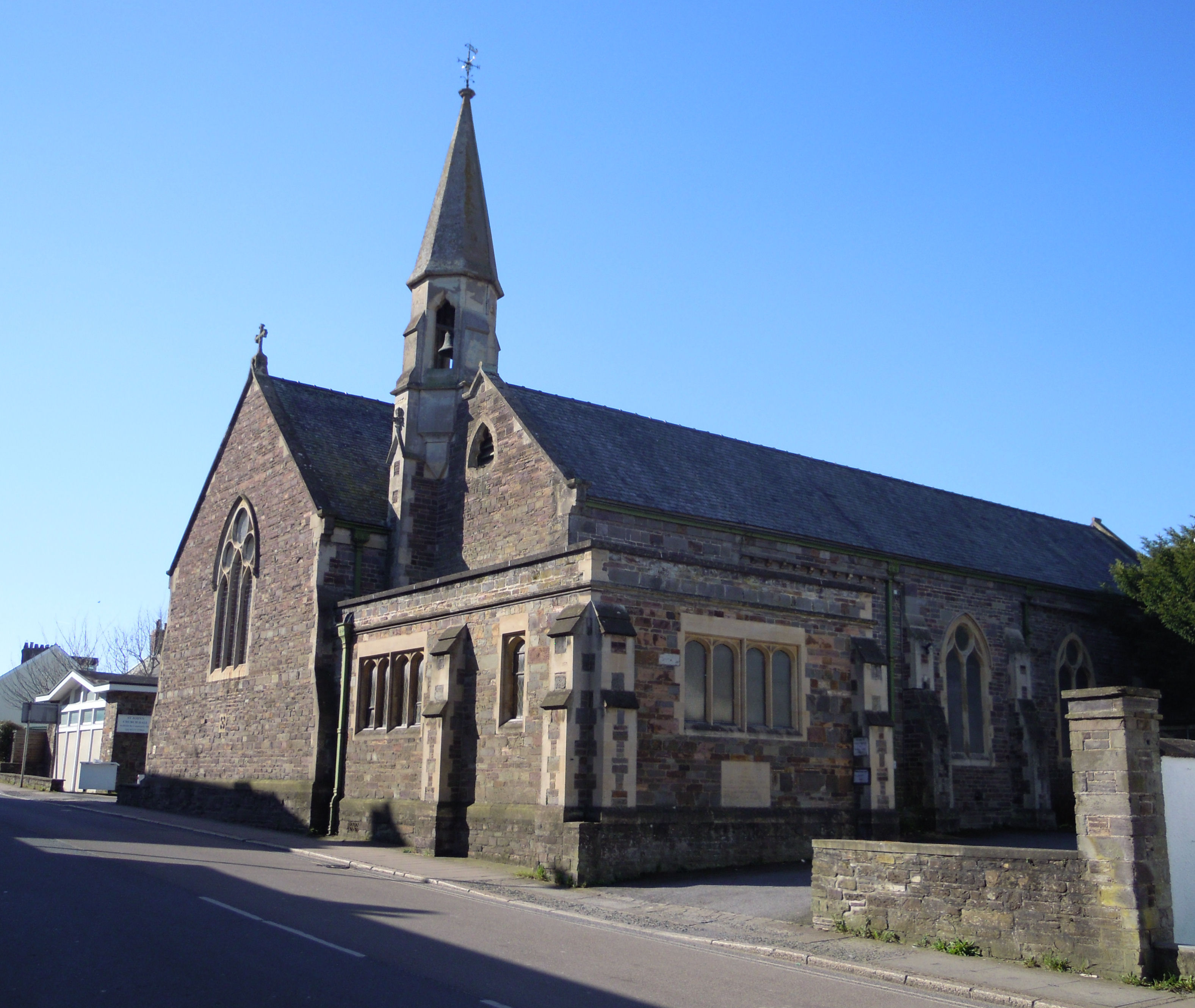
- Church of St John the Baptist, Newport

- Location within Devon
- Civil parish: Barnstaple
- District: North Devon
- Shire county: Devon
- Region: South West
- Country: England
- Sovereign state: United Kingdom

Newport is a suburb of the town of Barnstaple in the North Devon district of the county of Devon, England. It is situated one mile south-east of the historic centre of Barnstaple, between that town and Bishop's Tawton, on the east side of the River Taw. Few ancient buildings survive, the "Old Dairy" being a notable exception.

== History ==
Newport was a borough founded in the late 13th century by a Bishop of Exeter within his manor and parish of Bishop's Tawton, to serve as a rival to the river port of Barnstaple, a short distance downstream. A deed dated 1425 seen by Tristram Risdon (d.1640) evidences the existence of a mayor of the borough, but the borough status subsequently lapsed. Newport was brought within the municipal borough boundaries of Barnstaple in 1836, and was transferred from the parish of Bishop's Tawton to the parish of Barnstaple in 1885.

== Church ==
A chapel dedicated to St John was in ruins as mentioned by Risdon. A chapel of ease (administered by the parish church of Bishops Tawton about one mile to the south) was built in 1820, replaced by the surviving parish church of St John the Baptist in South Street, built in 1883.
