= John Chichester (died 1669) =

English politician

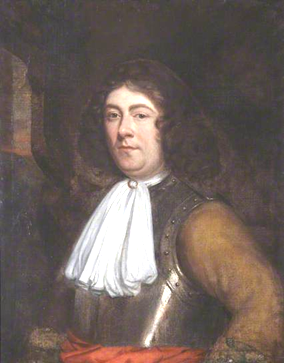
Sir John III Chichester (1598–1669) of Hall, dressed in Civil War armour. English School c.1650, National Trust, Arlington Court collection, Devon, ref:987416. Bequeathed by Miss Rosalie Chichester of Arlington Court, 1949

Arms of Chichester: Chequy or and gules, a chief vair

Sir John III Chichester (1598 – 24 September 1669) of Hall was member of parliament for Lostwithiel in Cornwall in 1624.

== Origins ==
{{

Chichester was baptised on 10 December 1598. He was the son and heir of John II Chichester (1566/7–1608) of Hall, Bishop's Tawton, Devon, by his wife Anne Basset (1576–1664), daughter of Sir Arthur Basset (d. 1586) of Umberleigh House, about 1½ miles south of Hall on the opposite bank of the River Taw, and of Heanton Punchardon, by his wife Elinor Chichester, daughter of Sir John Chichester (d. 1569), knight, of Raleigh, the head of the senior line of the Chichester family of Devon, possibly the leading gentry family in North Devon. The Chichesters of Hall were descended from the Chichesters of Raleigh, namely from Richard Chichester, a younger son of that house, who married the heiress Thomasine de Hall (d. 1502).

== Education ==
He subscribed at Oxford University on 18 November 1614 and was awarded a BA from Exeter College on 28 February 1617. He was a student of the Inner Temple in 1617.

== Career ==
In 1624, he was elected member of parliament for Lostwithiel. He was knighted on 17 September 1625.

== Marriages and children ==
He married three times:

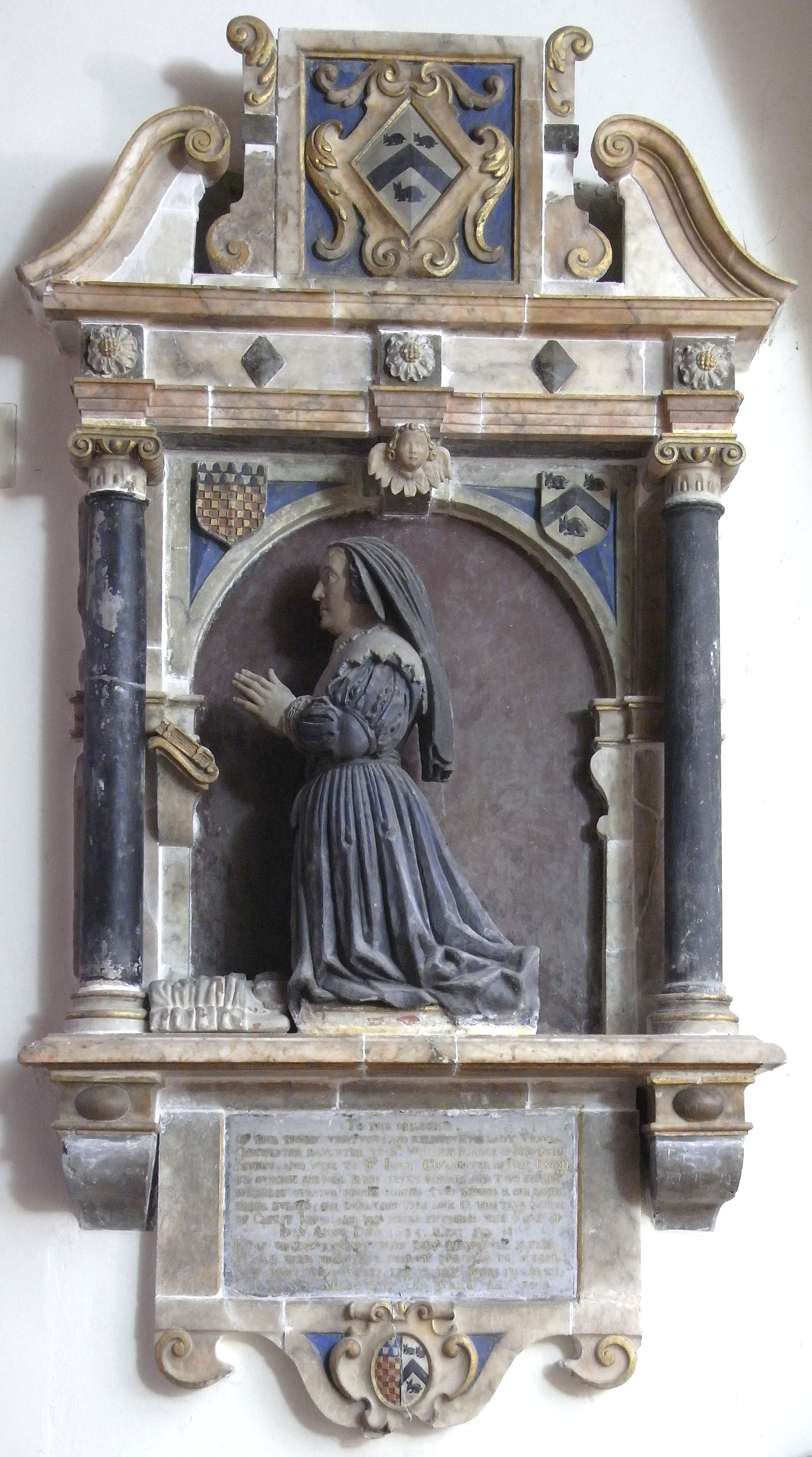
Mural monument to Ursula Strode (d. 1635), 1st wife of Sir John III Chichester (d. 1669) of Hall. South wall of chancel, Bishop's Tawton Church

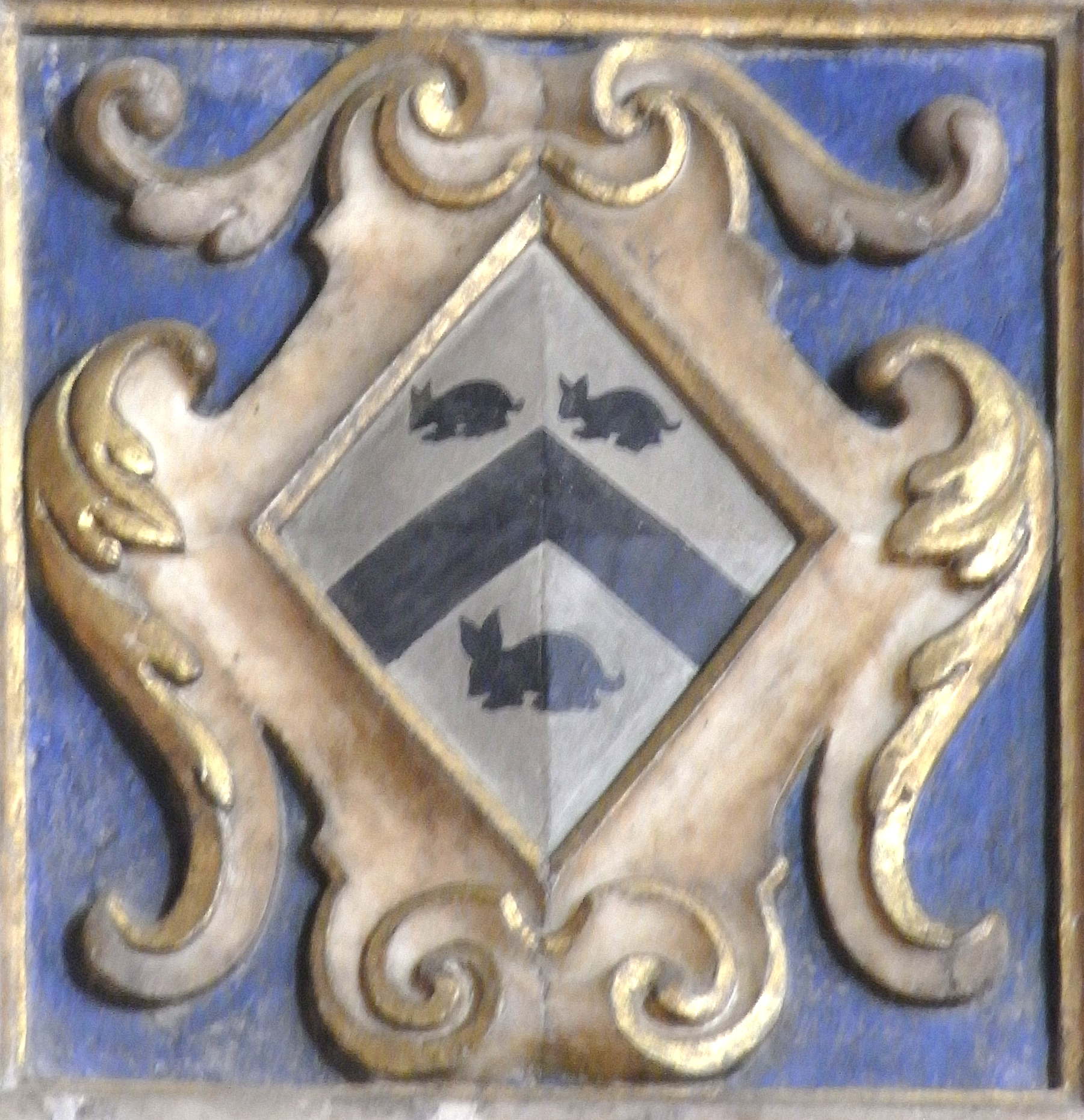
Arms of Strode: Argent, a chevron between three conies courant sable, detail from mural monument to Ursula Strode (d. 1635), 1st wife of Sir John III Chichester (d. 1669) of Hall. Bishop's Tawton Church

- Firstly to Ursula Strode (d. 1635), daughter of Sir William Strode (d. 1637), MP, of Newnham, Plympton St Mary, whose monument in Plympton St Mary's Church shows his effigy with that of his two wives and ten children. Her brother was the parliamentarian William Strode (1594–1645), one of the Five Members whose attempted arrest in the House of Commons of England by King Charles I in 1642 sparked the Civil War. Ursula's mural monument exists in Bishops Tawton Church, showing her effigy kneeling at a prie dieu with two babies side-by-side wrapped in swaddling clothes in front of her. At the top within an elaborate gilded frame within a broken pediment is a lozenge showing the arms of Strode: Argent, a chevron between three conies courant sable. On the arch above her is shown on the dexter the arms of Chichester and on the sinister the arms of Strode. Below underneath an inscribed tablet is a cartouche bearing the arms of Chichester impaling Strode. The tablet is inscribed as follows:

To the memorie of the truly vertuous and religious the Lady Ursula Chichester daughter to Sr. William Strode of Newingeam, Knight, and wife to Sr. John Chichester of Hall, Knight, by whome she had issue seven sonnes and two daughters whereof survive fower sonnes, two sonnes & one daught. heere buried. She departed this life in the true faith of Christ Jesus and was heere enterred the 6th (5th?) day of July Anno D(omi)ni 1635 aetat(is) suae (47?).
Fayre virtuous sainct injoy thy peacefull sleepe,
While wee that live employ our foes to weepe,
But when thou wak'st let glory shew thy grace,
Let Heav'n, which only can, enrich thy face.

They had six sons, all of whom died childless, although two of them inherited successively the estate of Hall:

  - John IV Chichester (1626–1684), eldest son by Ursula Strode, who died without children and was buried at Bath Abbey, where exists a monument to his memory.
  - Francis Chichester (1628–1698) who died childless.

Upon the death of the last of these two sons in 1698 the estate of Hall passed to Arthur Chichester (1670–1737/8), of Pill (a house immediately north of Bishop's Tawton village) a distant cousin descended from Hugh Chichester (d. 1644) of Tavistock, a younger brother of John II Chichester (d. 1608) of Hall.

- Secondly he married Elizabeth Pollard, daughter of Sir Lewis Pollard, 1st Baronet (c.1578 – c.1645) of King's Nympton, by whom he had a daughter Susannah Chichester (1665–1707/8), whose monument exists in Swimbridge Church and who married her cousin Henry Chichester of Stowford, also descended from Hugh Chichester (d. 1644) of Tavistock.
- Thirdly he married Susannah Stevens, daughter of William Stevens of Great Torrington and widow of either Henry Rolle (d. 1647) of Beam, later the heir of the great estate of Stevenstone or of Alexander Rolle (d. 1660) of Tawstock. The Stevens family were seated at Vielstone, Buckland Brewer, Cross, Little Torrington and at Winscott, Peters Marland. In the early 19th. century they were for a while heir presumptive to the vast estates of John Rolle, 1st Baron Rolle (d. 1842) of Stevenstone.

== Death and burial ==
Chichester died on 24 September 1669 aged about 71 and was buried in the chancel of St Peter's Church, Bishop's Tawton.

== Mural monument ==
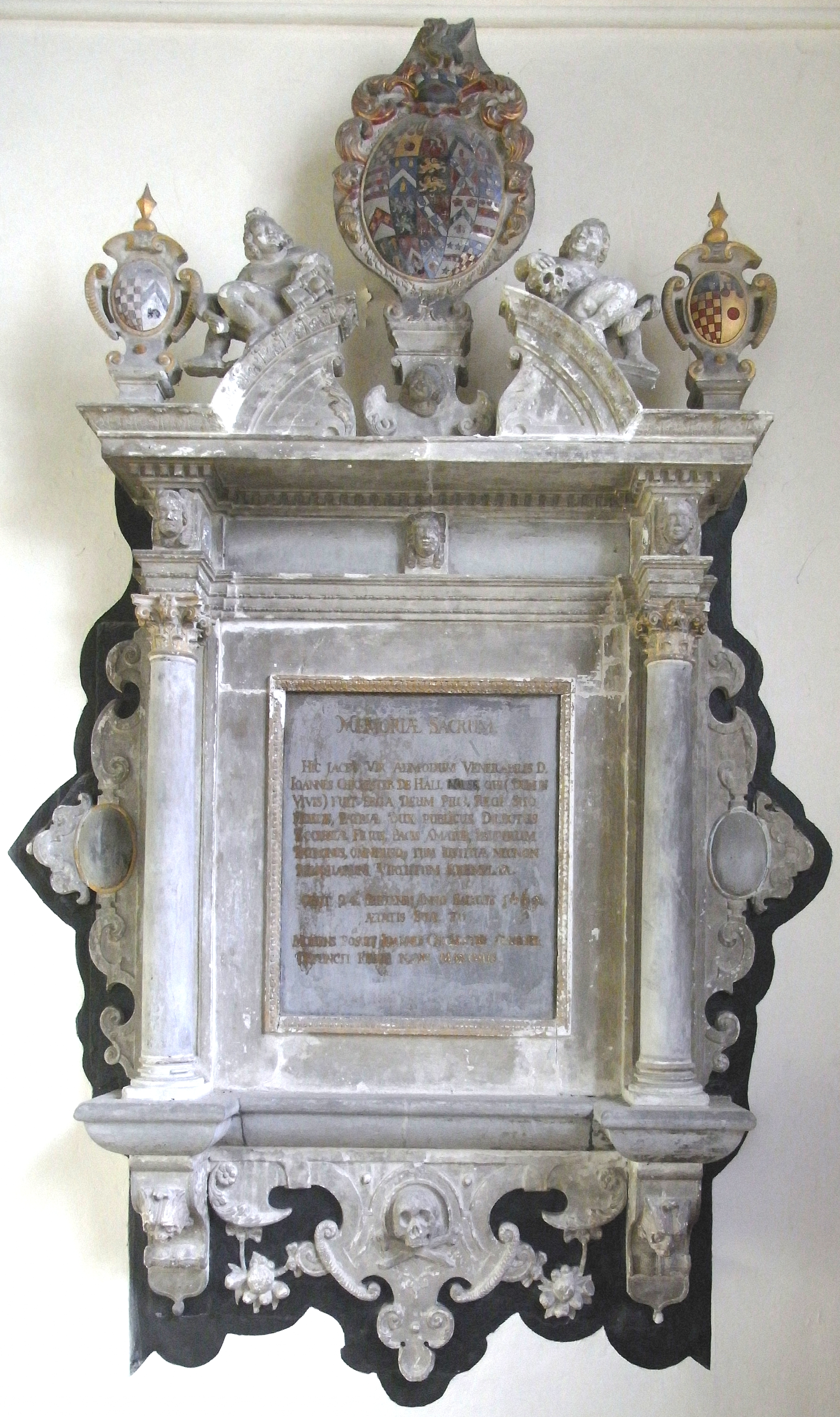
Mural monument to Sir John III Chichester (d. 1669), Bishop's Tawton Church, north wall of chancel

A baroque mural monument exists in Bishop's Tawton Church to Sir John III Chichester (d. 1669), on top of which in the centre is shown an escutcheon of twenty quarterings with on the dexter the arms of Chichester impaling Strode, with on the sinister, more recently restored, Chichester impaling Courtenay (perhaps of Powderham or of Molland), with which families no close connection of his is recorded and which is therefore inexplicable. In this position might be expected to have been placed the arms of one of his later wives, Pollard or Stevens. The Latin inscription is as follows:

Memoriae Sacrum. Hic jacet vir admodum venerabilis D(ominus) Jo(h)annes Chichester de Hall, Eques, qui (dum in vivis) fuit erga deum pius, regi suo fidelis, patriae dux publicus dilectus, ecclesiae filius, pacis amator, pauperum patronus, omnibusq(ue) tum justitiae necnon reliquarum virtutum exemplar. Obiit 24.o Septemb(ri) Anno Salutis 1669. Maerens posuit Jo(h)annes Chichester, Armiger, defuncti filius natu maximus ("Sacred to the Memory. Here lies a man altogether venerable, Sir John Chichester, Knight, who (whilst amongst the living) was towards God pious, to his king faithful, to his country a beloved public leader, to the Church a son, to peace a lover, to the poor a patron and in everything as to justice, and certainly of the rest of the virtues, an example. He died on the 24th of September in the Year of the Redemption 1669. John Chichester, Esquire, the eldest son of the deceased, mourning, erected this")

=== Quarterings ===
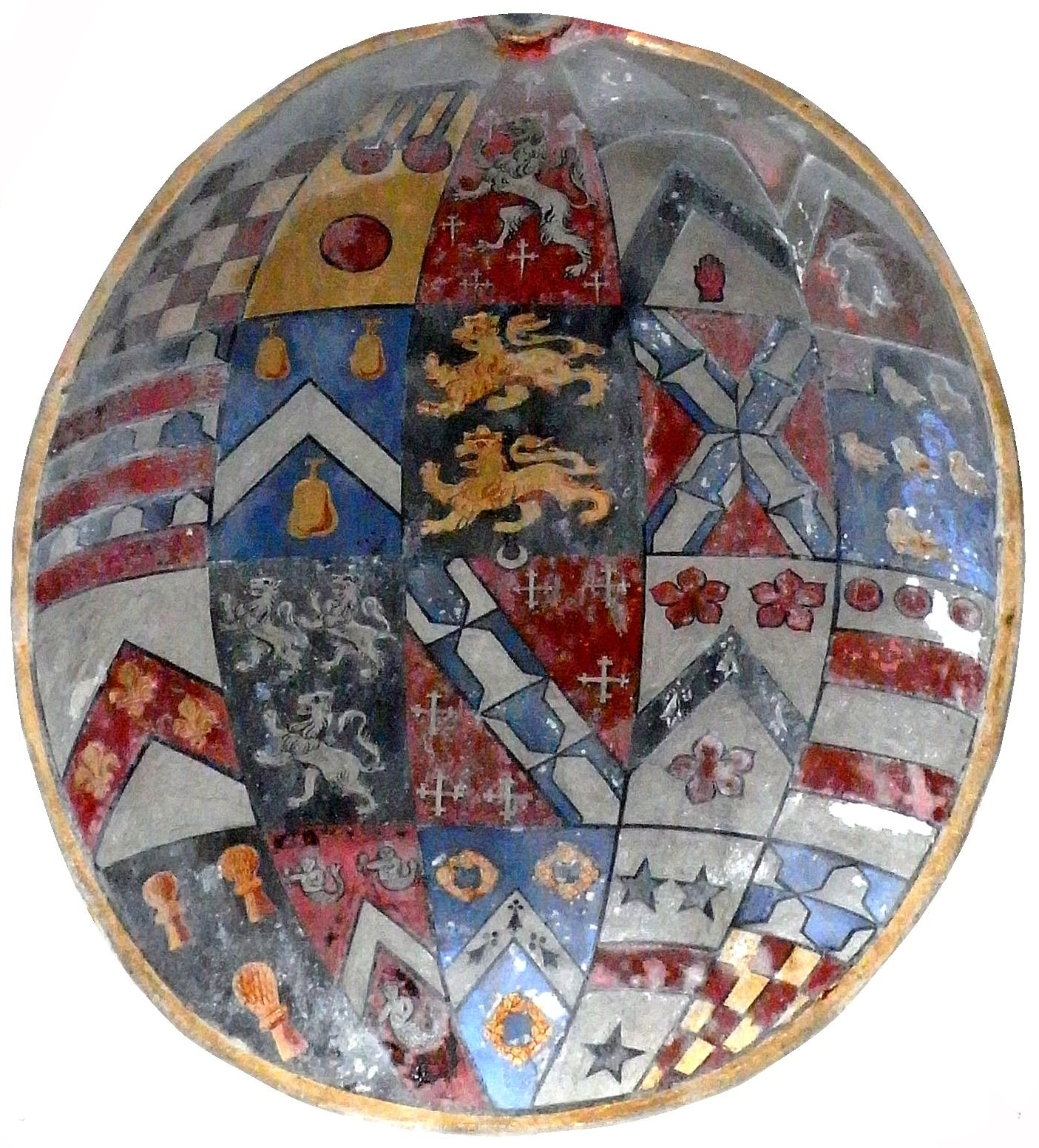
Heraldic cartouche of 20 quarterings on mural monument to Sir John III Chichester (d. 1669) of Hall

At the top of the mural monument to Sir John III Chichester (d. 1669) is an oval heraldic cartouche supported by two putti with the crest of Chichester above. The cartouche shows the following 20 quarters:
1: Chequy or and gules a chief vair (Chichester)
2: Or, three torteaux a label of three points azure (Courtenay)
3: Gules semé of crosses crosslet fitché, a lion rampant argent
4: Argent, a fess between two chevrons sable in base the Red Hand of Ulster
5: Gules, a chevron between three goat's heads erased ermine attired or (Marwood of Westcot, Marwood)
6: Barry of six vair and gules (Beaumont of Youlstone, Shirwell)
7: Azure, a chevron argent between three pears or
8: Sable, two lions passant crowned or
9: Gules, a saltire vair (Willington of Umberleigh)
10: Azure, seven martlets or on a canton (sable?) a turtle (gules?)
11: Argent, on a chevron gules three fleurs-de-lis or
12: Sable, three lions rampant argent
13: Gules crusilly or, a bend vair (Raleigh of Raleigh, Pilton, with crescent for difference; erroneous arms)
14: Argent, a chevron counter-ermine between three cinquefoils gules (de Hall)
15: Argent, two bars gules in chief three torteaux (Mules/Moels of Halmeston, Bishops Tawton)
16: Sable, three garbs or
17: Gules, a chevron between three mermaids each holding a mirror in her right hand and a comb in her left argent (Gough of Aldercombe)
18: Azure, a chevron ermine between three chaplets or
19: Argent, a fess gules between three mullets sable
20: Chequy or and gules a chief vair (Chichester)

== Sources ==
- Hunneyball, Paul, biography of Sir John Chichester (d. 1669) published in The History of Parliament: House of Commons 1604–1629, ed. Andrew Thrush and John P. Ferris, 2010
- Vivian, J. L., Lt.-Col., The Visitations of the County of Devon comprising the Heralds' Visitations of 1531, 1564 & 1620, Exeter, 1895, Chichester: pp. 172–184, Chichester of Hall: pp. 176–178
- www.tudorplace.com (pedigree of Chichester family)
- Burke's Landed Gentry, 1937, pp. 400–401, Chichester of Hall
- Lauder, Rosemary, Devon Families, Tiverton, 2002, pp. 35–40, Chichester of Hall & Arlington
- Risdon, Tristram, The Chorographical Description or Survey of the County of Devon, manuscript circa 1635, 1810 edition, pp. 321–2

Parliament of England
Preceded by Edward Salter; Sir George Chudleigh	Member of Parliament for Lostwithiel; 1624; With: John Hobart	Succeeded by Sir George Chudleigh; Reginald Mohun; Sir Henry Vane; Nicholas Kendall
