= Pill, Bishop's Tawton =

Historic estate in north Devon, England

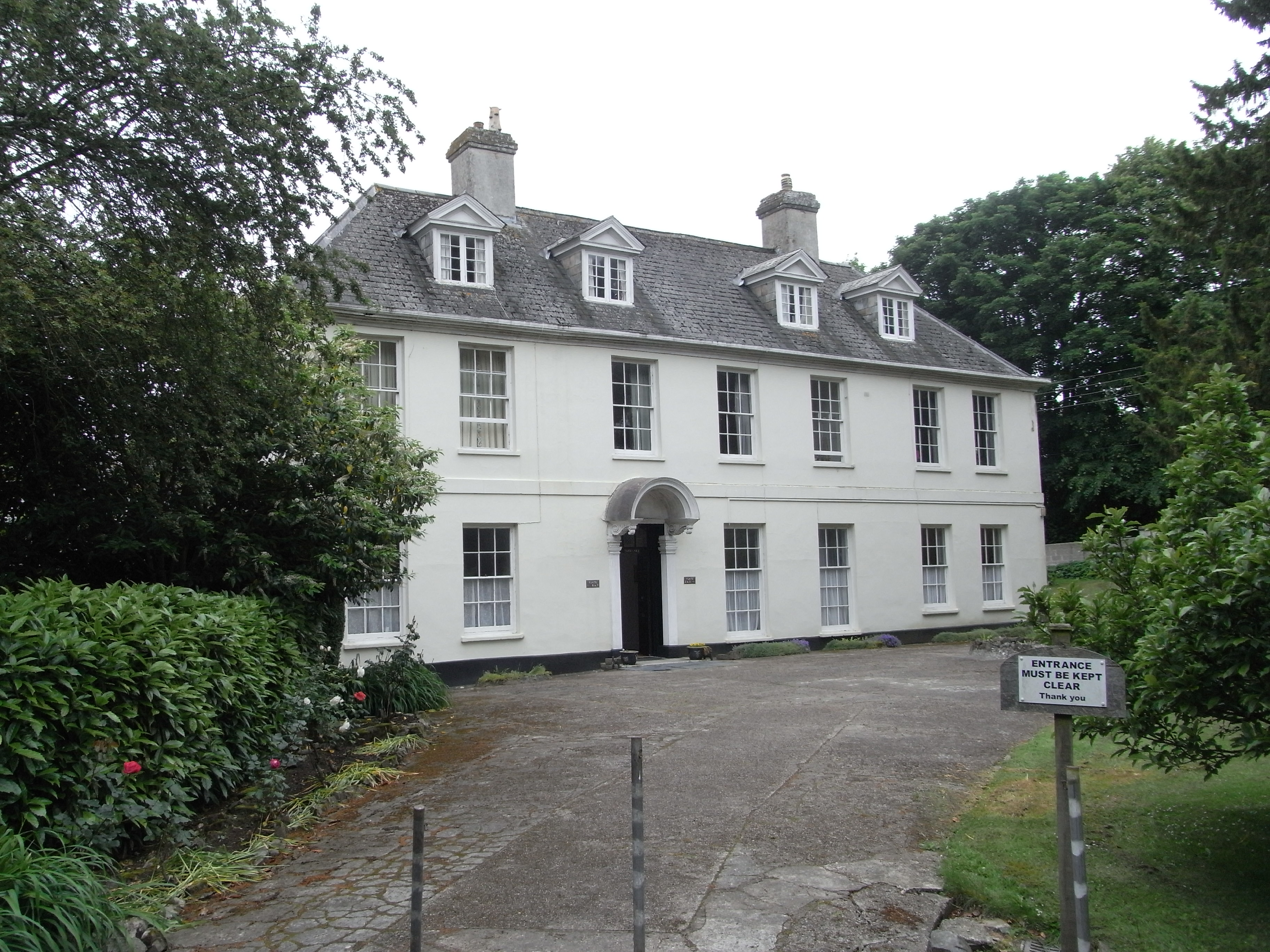
Pill House, Bishop's Tawton, Devon

Pill (alias Pille, Pylle, etc.) is an historic estate in the parish of Bishop's Tawton, near Barnstaple, in North Devon, England. The surviving 18th-century mansion house known as Pill House is a grade II* listed building situated close to the east bank of the River Taw about 1 mile south of the historic centre of Barnstaple and 1 mile north of Bishop's Tawton Church. It was long a seat of a junior branch of the Chichester family of Hall, Bishop's Tawton. At some time before 1951 it was converted into apartments and is at present in multiple occupation.

== Descent ==
=== de la Pille ===
The earliest recorded holder of the estate according to the Devon historian Sir William Pole (d.1635) was the de la Pille family, which took its name from the estate. Successive holders were:

- John de la Pille
- Benedict de la Pille
- Michaell de la Pille (fl. 1315), who left his daughter as his sole heiress, who married Robert Fulk of Halmeston (mod: Halmpstone), Bishop's Tawton, to which family passed Pill.

=== Fulk/Fowke ===
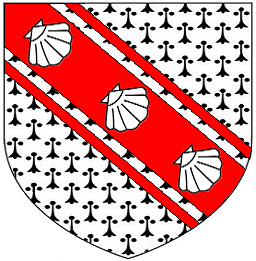
Arms of "Fowke of Pyll": Ermine, on a bend cotised gules three escallops argent

The descent of the Fulk family of Pill included:

- Robert Fulk of Halmeston (mod: Halmpstone) in the parish of Bishop's Tawton inherited Pill on his marriage to the de la Pille heiress of Pill. He was resident at Pill in 1345.
- John Fulk, resident at Pill in 1376.
- William Fulk, resident at Pill in 1393.

The Borough of Newport lies between Pill and Barnstaple, and received its royal charter perhaps in 1294, when King Edward I granted it a market on Mondays, and a fair for three days at Midsummer. The only surviving names of Mayors of Newport discovered by the Devon historian George Oliver (1842), in ancient deeds were: Michael de la Pille, 1334; Robert Fouke, 1334; William Fouke, 1396. On 6 April 1400 Edmund Stafford (1344-1419), Bishop of Exeter, licensed a Chapel in Pill Barton for the Fouke Family.

=== Perrot ===
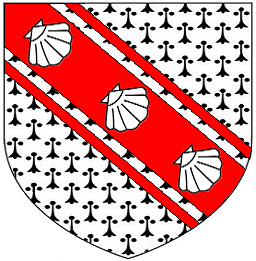
Arms of Perrot of Pill, according to Pole the same arms as "Fowke of Pyll": Ermine, on a bend cotised gules three escallops argent

- Thomas Perrot, who acquired Pill on his marriage to a Fulk co-heiress of Pill.
- John Perrot.
- Thomas Perrot (fl. 1435)

=== Travers ===
The Travers family from Hampshire succeeded Perrot at Pill. Travers of Pill bore arms: Argent, three bears passant in pale sable muzzled and chained or.

Bryan Travers of Pill was seemingly the last in the male line and his daughter Catherine Travers (d.1613) married Hugh Chichester (1574-1644) of Tavistock (sic, Tawstock, directly across the River Taw from Bishop's Tawton).

=== Chichester ===
Arms of Chichester: Chequy or and gules, a chief vair

According to Oliver (1842) The Pill Estate was sold to Sir John Chichester (1598-1669), of Hall in the parish of Bishop's Tawton, by Peter and John Bulteel, on 27 May 1634. His uncle was Hugh Chichester (1574-1644) of Tavistock (sic, Tawstock, directly across the River Taw from Bishop's Tawton), who married Catherine Travers (d.1613), the daughter of Bryan Travers of Pill. Hugh Chichester was the 8th son of John Chichester (d.1596) of Hall by his wife Elizabeth Marwood (d.1615), eldest daughter of John Marwood of Westcott, Devon. Pill eventually descended, by means unknown, from the Chichesters of Hall to their cousins the Chichesters of Stowford, descended from Hugh Chichester (1574-1644) and his wife Catherine Travers:

- Arthur Chichester (1612-1687) (son and heir of Hugh Chichester) of Stowford, about 5 miles south-east of Pill, in the parish of Swimbridge within the large manor of Bishop's Tawton. He married Anne Garland, daughter of John Garland of Whitefield. He was predeceased by his eldest son Arthur Chichester (d.1682), whose mural monument survives in Swimbridge Church.

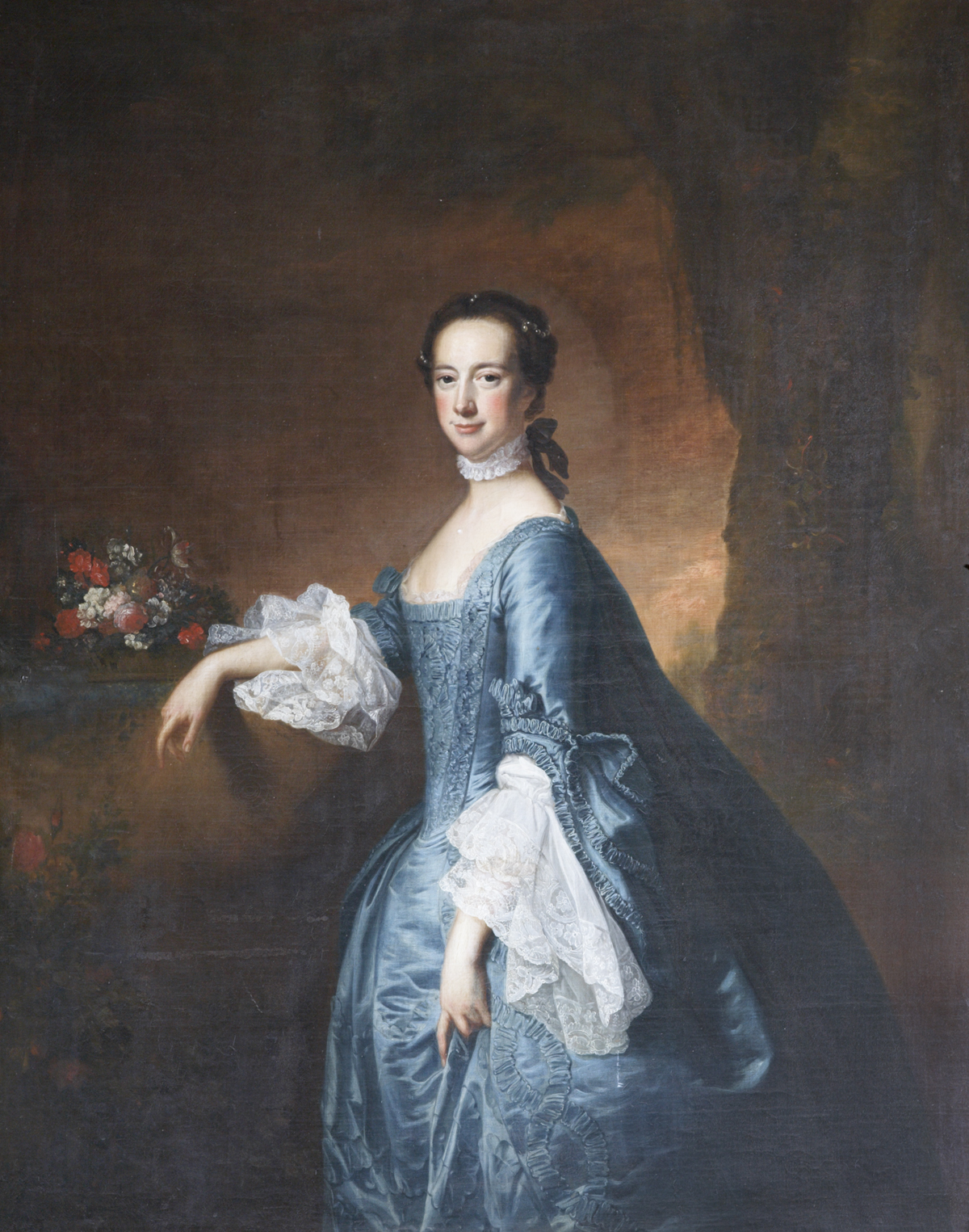
Anne Chichester, wife of Denys Rolle by Thomas Hudson (1701-79); Collection of Great Torrington Almshouse

- Arthur Chichester (1670-1738), grandson, "of Pill", eldest son of Arthur Chichester (d.1682) of Stowford. His younger brother Henry Chichester (1678-1730) resided at Stowford, and has a surviving mural monument in Swimbridge Church, whilst he himself resided at Pill. He married firstly Jane Arundell (d.1717), daughter of John Harris Arundell of Wortham, by whom he had two sons, and secondly to Dorothy Rowe, by whom he had a further three sons and two daughters, one of whom was Anne Chichester (born 1721) the wife of Denys Rolle (1725-1797) of Stevenstone, near Great Torrington, the largest landowner in Devon, and mother of John Rolle, 1st Baron Rolle (1750-1842). In 1698 he inherited the much larger estate of Hall on the death without progeny of his cousin Francis Chichester (1629-1698) of Hall. Thenceforth Pill became a secondary residence of the Chichester family of Hall.

== Codd ==
Henry Frederick Codd (d. 1899) and his wife, Clara Virginia, née Botto (1853–1927) were living here in 1876 when their first child Clara Codd was born. She would become a suffragette and leading Theosophist.

== Sources ==
- Pole, Sir William (d.1635), Collections Towards a Description of the County of Devon, Sir John-William de la Pole (ed.), London, 1791, p. 414, Pille
- Risdon, Tristram (d.1640), Survey of Devon, 1811 edition, London, 1811, with 1810 Additions, p. 322
- Vivian, Lt.Col. J.L., (Ed.) The Visitations of the County of Devon: Comprising the Heralds' Visitations of 1531, 1564 & 1620, Exeter, 1895, pp. 176–8, pedigree of Chichester of Hall & Pill
