= Hall, Bishop's Tawton =

Historic estate in Devon, England

Coordinates: 51.0263°N 4.0184°W

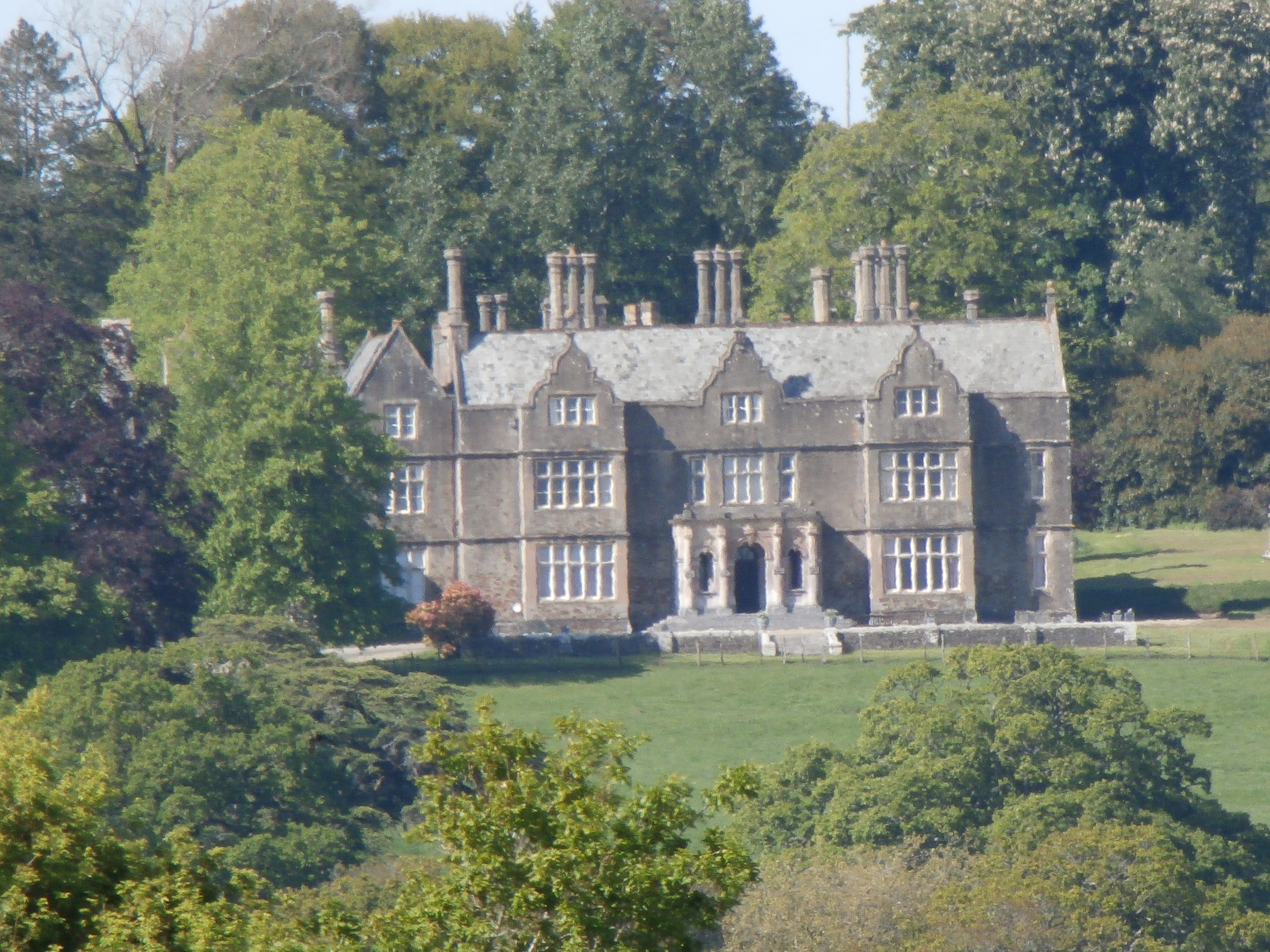
Hall, Bishop's Tawton, Devon, south (main) front. The Victorian baronial hall is situated at the west (left) end

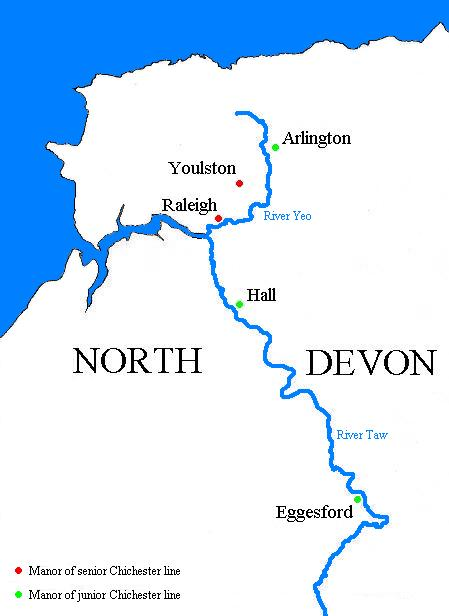
Location of historic manors of the Chichester family of North Devon: Raleigh in the parish of Pilton; Youlston in the parish of Shirwell; Arlington; Hall in the parish of Bishops Tawton; Eggesford

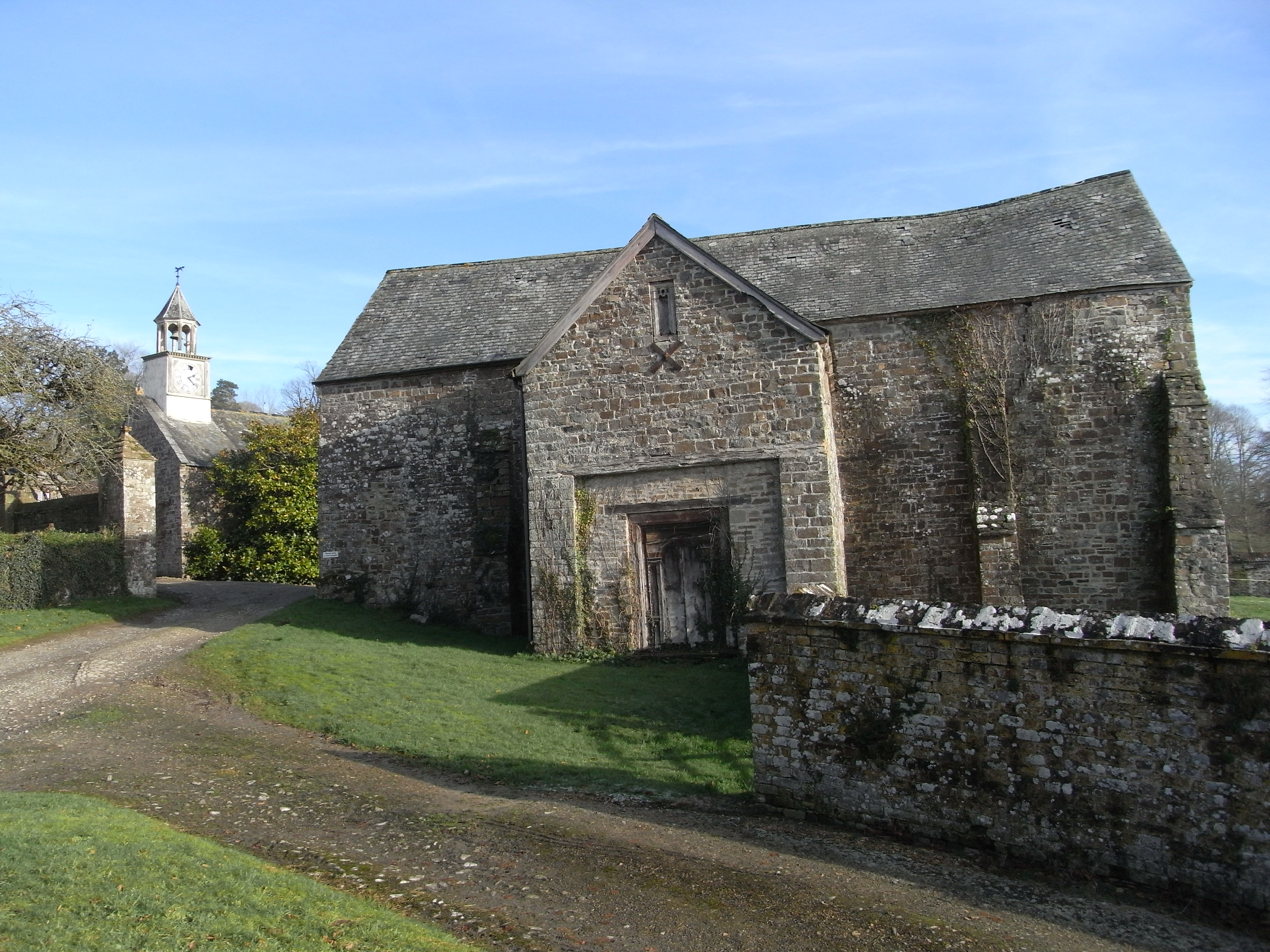
Stone barn, an old threshing barn next to Hall mansion house, which is situated directly behind

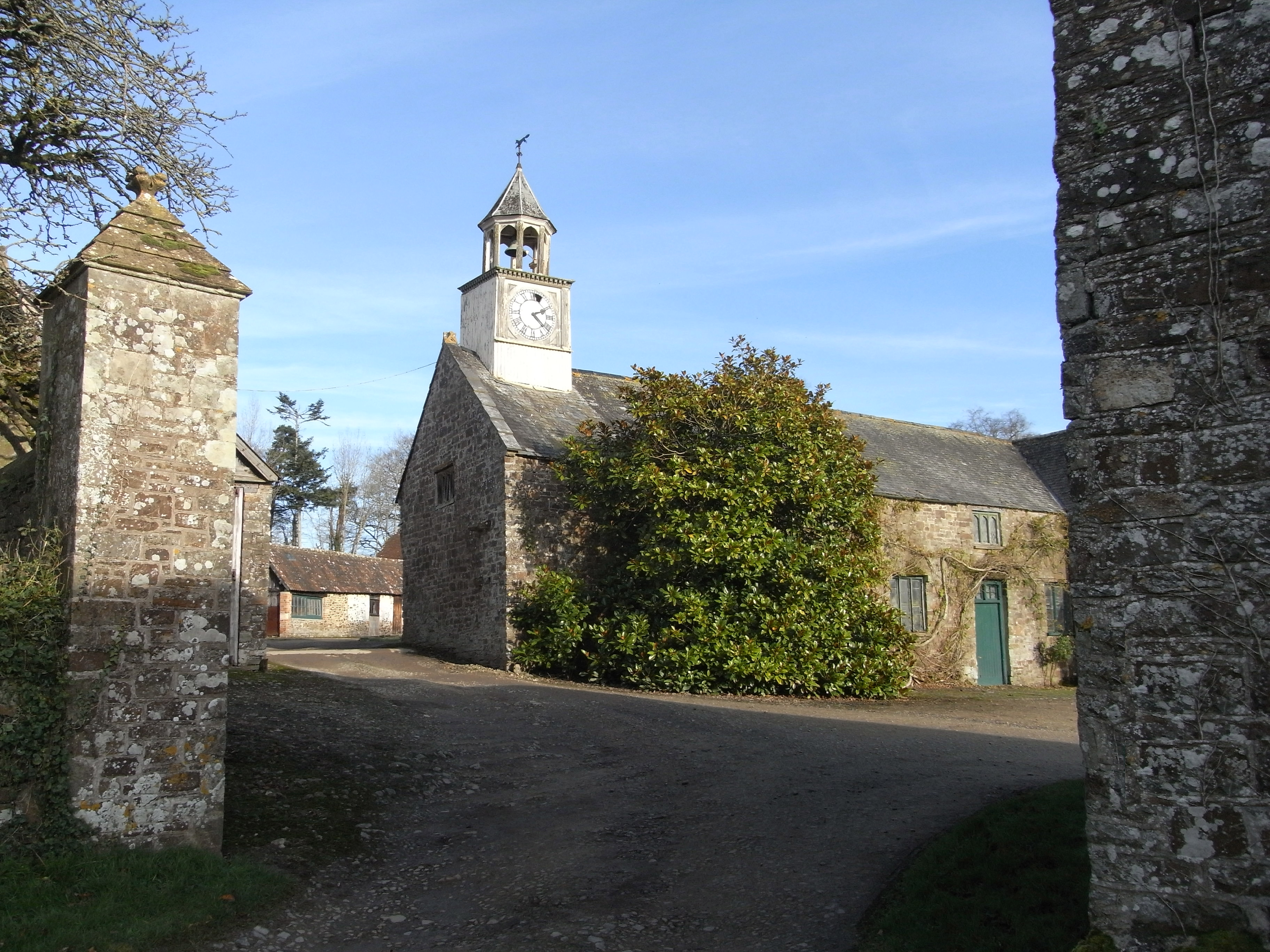
Stables or Clock-House, one of the many outbuildings surrounding the house on the north and west

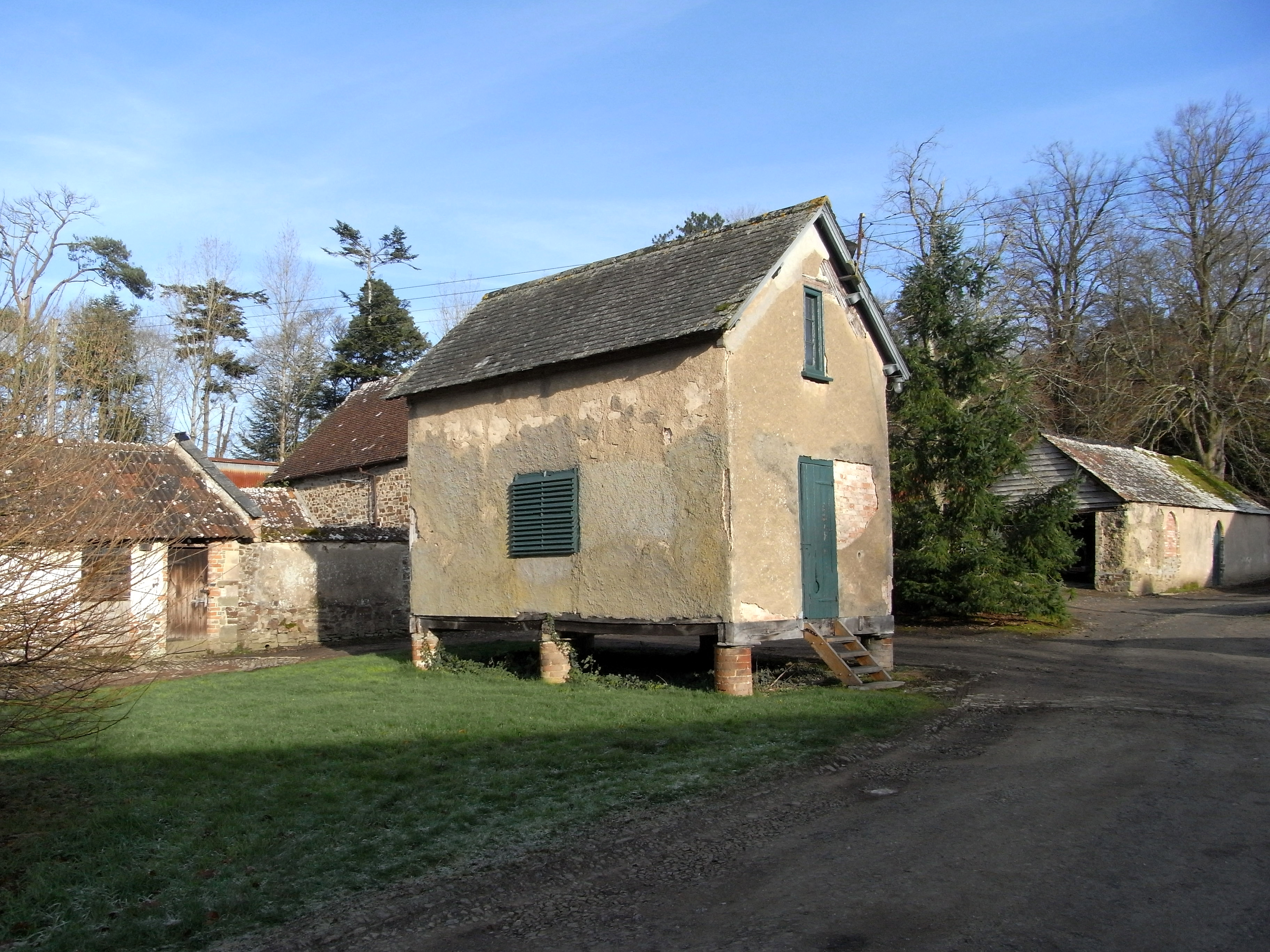
The granary at Hall

Hall is a large estate within the parish and former manor of Bishop's Tawton, Devon. It was for several centuries the seat of a younger branch of the prominent and ancient North Devon family of Chichester of Raleigh, near Barnstaple. The mansion house is situated about 2 miles south-east of the village of Bishop's Tawton and 4 miles south-east of Barnstaple, and sits on a south facing slope of the valley of the River Taw, overlooking the river towards the village of Atherington. The house and about 2,500 acres of surrounding land continues today to be owned and occupied by descendants, via a female line, of the Chichester family. The present Grade II* listed neo-Jacobean house was built by Robert Chichester between 1844 and 1847 and replaced an earlier building. Near the house to the south at the crossroads of Herner the Chichester family erected in the 1880s a private chapel of ease which contains mediaeval woodwork saved from the demolished Old Guildhall in Barnstaple.

== Descent ==
The descent of the estate of Hall was as follows:

== de Hall ==
The manor of Tawton was recorded in the Domesday Book of 1086 as one of the 24 holdings of the Bishop of Exeter. Within this manor was the estate of Hall, which a Bishop granted to his lawyer Simon de Hall, "a man very learned in the laws (who) grew so gracious with the Bishop". The Devon historian Tristram Risdon (d. 1640) states that Simon's father had previously been resident at Hall, albeit apparently only under a lease, and thus the family name is likely to have been de Hall before the grant to Simon, who was thus the first of his family to possess it freehold with a heritable interest. The feudal overlord remained the Lord of the manor of Bishop's Tawton, namely the Bishops of Exeter until the mid-1500s and then the Earls of Bedford. Simon de Hall died leaving no sons and his sole heiress was thus his only daughter Thomasine de Hall (d. 1502), who had married Richard Chichester. As part of the marriage settlement her father had settled on her his estate of Hall, and thus the estate became the possession of this junior branch of the Chichester family of North Devon, known as "Chichester of Hall" to differentiate it from several other prominent branches of the same family seated in Devon, namely at Raleigh, Youlston, Eggesford and Arlington. Richard Chichester the husband of Thomasine de Hall was the son of Richard Chichester, who was the son of John Chichester by his wife Elizabeth Dymock, a daughter and co-heiress of Richard Dymock. John Chichester was the younger son of Sir John Chichester (d. 1437) of Raleigh by his wife Alice Wotton, a daughter and co-heiress of John Wotton of Widworthy.

== Chichester ==
Arms of Chichester: Chequy or and gules, a chief vair

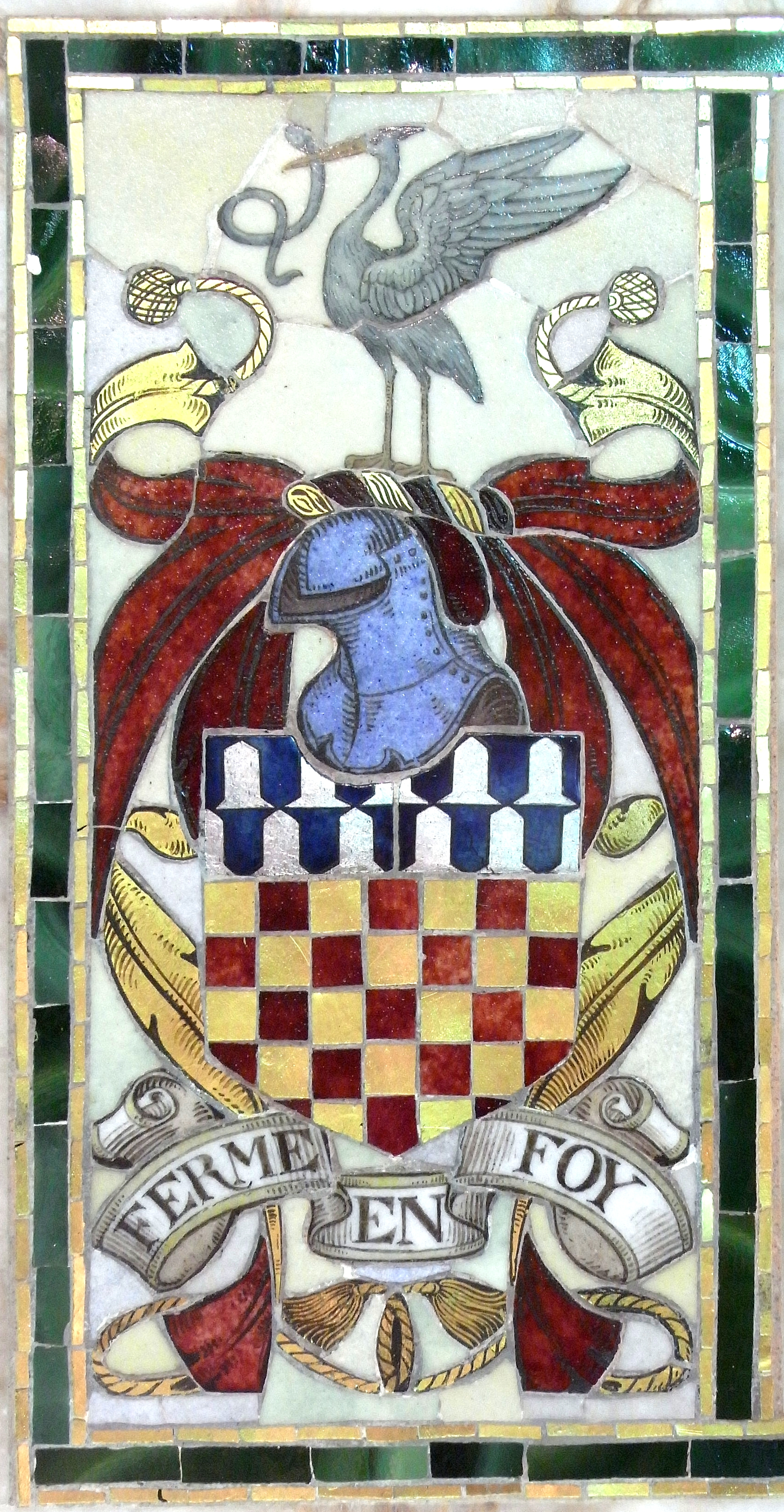
Heraldic achievement of Chichester family of Hall. Mosaic with inlaid stone on mural monument in Bishop's Tawton Church to Lt. Lionel Chichester (1873–1902), killed in action in the Boer War aged 29. The crest is a heron (or stork) with an eel (or snake) in its beak, the motto in ancient French is: Ferme en foy ("Firm in faith")

The descent of the Chichester family of Hall is given thus in the Heralds' Visitations of Devon:

=== Richard Chichester (b. 1456) ===
Richard Chichester (b. 1456) married Thomasine de Hall (d. 1502), the heiress of Hall, whom he survived as he was named in his wife's inquisition post mortem.

=== James Chichester (b. 1480; d. 1548) ===
James Chichester (b. 1480; d.1548) (eldest son & heir), married Elizabeth (Katheryn) Gough, daughter of Richard Gough of Aldercombe, who survived her husband.

=== Robert Chichester (b. 1515; d.1563) ===
Robert Chichester (b. 1515; d.1563) (second son), whose elder brother Thomas Chichester pre-deceased their father. He married Ellen Acland, daughter of Sir John Acland of Acland in the adjacent parish of Landkey, which Acland family grew to rival the Chichesters in prominence in North Devon. His will dated 13 March 1563 mentions his "capital house or manor at Hall lately by me re-edified". This would therefore have been an Elizabethan-style house re-built by him. His will also mentions the following lands inherited from his mother: "Aldercombe, Abberly and Ford in (the parish of) Kilkhampton", Cornwall.

=== John Chichester (b. about 1550; d.1596) ===
John Chichester (b. about 1550; d.1596) (eldest son and heir), married Elizabeth Marwood (d. 1615), eldest daughter of John Marwood of Westcott, Devon.

=== John Chichester (1566/7–1608) ===
John Chichester (1566/7–1608) (eldest son and heir), married in 1591 Anne Basset (1576–1664), daughter of Sir Arthur Basset (d. 1586) of Umberleigh House, about 1 1/2 miles south of Hall on the opposite bank of the River Taw, and of Heanton Punchardon, by his wife Elinor Chichester, daughter of Sir John Chichester (d. 1569) of Raleigh. The Basset family rivalled the Chichesters of Raleigh as one of the leading families of North Devon and had at the start of the 16th. century shared with them the inheritance of the ancient Beaumont family of Youlston by marriages to Beaumont co-heiresses. The Chichesters of Raleigh received the manor of Shirwell and its capital mansion of Youlston whilst the Bassetts of Whitechapel, Bishops Nympton received Umberleigh, Heanton Punchardon and Ashford. A simple monument exists in memory of Anne Basset in Bishop's Tawton Church consisting of a small slate tablet placed against the back-wall under the recessed arch containing the gothic-lettered ledger-stone of John Chichester (d. 1596) of Hall, possibly re-positioned after the Victorian re-building of the church. The inscription is as follows: "Sacred to the pious memory of the wor(shipfu)ll M(ist)r(es)s Anna Chichester of Westcote the relict of John Chichester of Hall Esq.r and daughter of the Hon.ble Sir Arthur Basset of Heanton, Knight, who departed this life the last day of March Anno Dom. 1664 and in the year of her age 88. William son of Sir John Chichester of Hall, Knight and the Lady Ursula his wife died the 19th of April 1664 aged 30". The formula Worshipful is also used on the ledger stone of her father Sir Arthur Basset in Atherington Church, possibly moved from the Umberleigh Chapel. Westcote was one of three Domesday Book manors within the present parish of Marwood in the hundred of Braunton, and was one of the 27 Devon holdings of Theobald FitzBerner, whose tenant there was Oliver. It was recorded later in the Book of Fees as Westecoth held by Eustace de Marwood from the feudal barony of Great Torrington. It was inherited by the Chichesters of Hall on the marriage of John Chichester (d. 1608) to Elizabeth Marwood, one of the three daughters and co-heiresses of John Marwood. It appears to have been used by the Chichester family as a dower house. Another ancient estate called "Westacott" exists today immediately to the north-west of Hall, in the parish of Bishop's Tawton. Their daughter Elizabeth Chichester (d. 1628) married Richard Delbridge, a prominent merchant of Barnstaple, and her mural monument exists in St Peter's Church, Barnstaple.

==== Monument to daughter Elizabeth ====
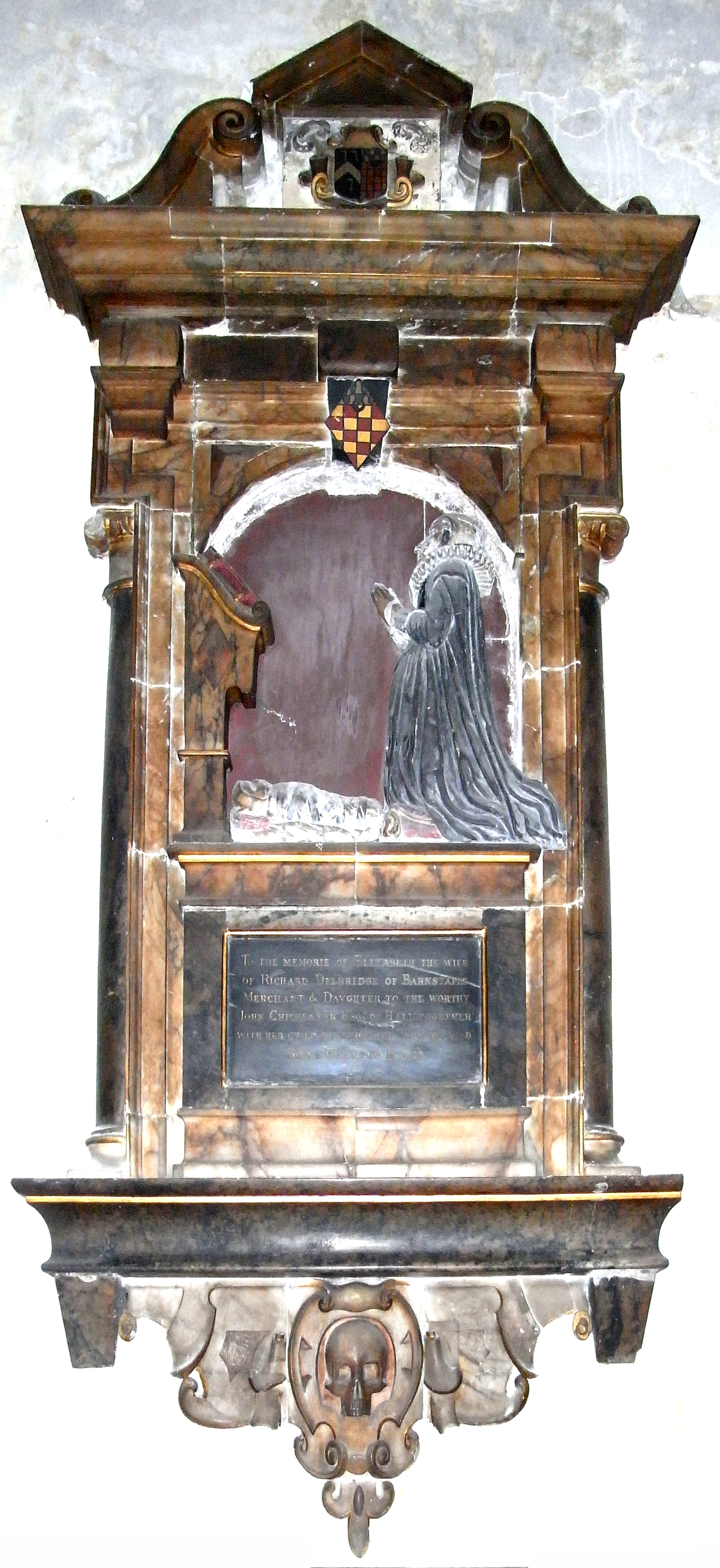
Mural monument to Elizabeth Chichester (d. 1628), a daughter of John Chichester (d. 1608) of Hall and wife of the Barnstaple merchant Richard Delbridge. St Peter's Church, Barnstaple

There exists in St Peter's Church, Barnstaple, on the south aisle wall, a mural monument to Elizabeth Chichester (d. 1628), a daughter of John Chichester (d. 1608) and the wife of the Barnstaple Merchant Richard Delbridge, son and heir of the influential merchant John Delbridge (1564–1639), six times MP for Barnstaple and three times mayor. The Inscription is as follows: "To the memorie of Elizabeth the wife of Richard Delbridge of Barnstaple, merchant, & daughter to the worthy John Chichester Esq.r of Hall, together with her child of which she died in childbirth December 18, 1628". She is depicted kneeling at a prie dieu with a baby in swaddling clothes on the ground in front of her. Above her is a lozenge showing the arms of Chichester, differenced by a crescent. On top of the monument is an escutcheon with the arms of Delbridge (Sable, a chevron argent between three swan's heads and necks couped proper) impaling Chichester.

=== Sir John Chichester (1598–1669) ===
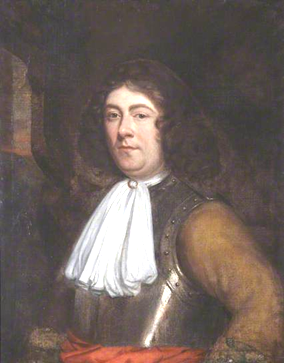
Sir John Chichester (1598–1669) of Hall, dressed in Civil War armour. English School c.1650, National Trust, Arlington Court collection, Devon, ref:987416. Bequeathed by Miss Rosalie Chichester of Arlington Court, 1949

Sir John Chichester (1598–1669), eldest son and heir, was aged 9 on his father's death. In 1624 he was elected MP for Lostwithiel in Cornwall and was knighted in 1625. He married three times:

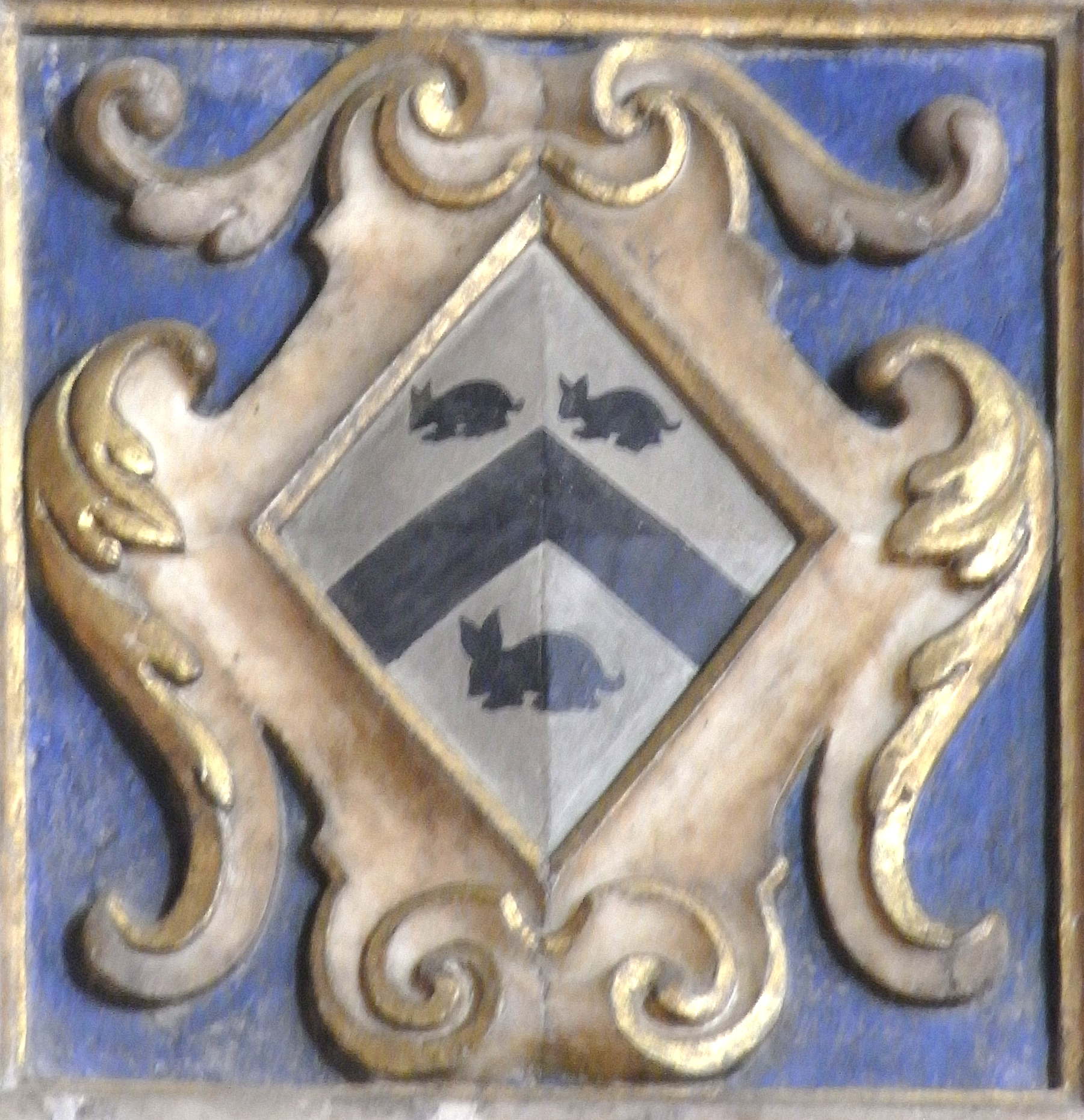
Arms of Strode: Argent, a chevron between three conies courant sable, detail from mural monument to Ursula Strode (d. 1635), 1st wife of Sir John Chichester (d. 1669) of Hall. Bishop's Tawton Church

- Firstly to Ursula Strode (d. 1635), daughter of Sir William Strode (d. 1637), MP, of Newnham, Plympton St Mary, whose monument in Plympton St Mary's Church shows his effigy with that of his two wives and ten children. Her brother was the parliamentarian William Strode (1594–1645), one of the Five Members whose attempted arrest in the House of Commons of England by King Charles I in 1642 sparked the Civil War. They had six sons, all of whom died childless, although two of them inherited successively the estate of Hall. Upon the death of the last of these two brothers in 1698 the estate of Hall passed to Arthur Chichester (1670–1737/8), of Pill (a house immediately north of Bishop's Tawton village) a distant cousin descended from Hugh Chichester (d. 1644) of Tavistock, a younger brother of John Chichester (d. 1608) of Hall. Ursula's mural monument with her kneeling effigy exists in Bishops Tawton Church.
- Secondly he married Elizabeth Pollard, daughter of Sir Lewis Pollard, 1st Baronet (c.1578-c.1645) of King's Nympton, by whom he had a daughter Susannah Chichester (1665–1707/8), whose monument exists in Swimbridge Church and who married her cousin Henry Chichester of Stowford, also descended from Hugh Chichester (d. 1644) of Tavistock.
- Thirdly he married Susannah Stevens, daughter of William Stevens of Great Torrington and widow of either Henry Rolle (d. 1647) of Beam, later the heir of the great estate of Stevenstone or of Alexander Rolle (d. 1660) of Tawstock. The Stevens family were seated at Vielstone, Buckland Brewer, Cross, Little Torrington and at Winscott, Peters Marland. In the early 19th. century they were for a while heir presumptive to the vast estates of John Rolle, 1st Baron Rolle (d. 1842) of Stevenstone.

==== Mural monument ====
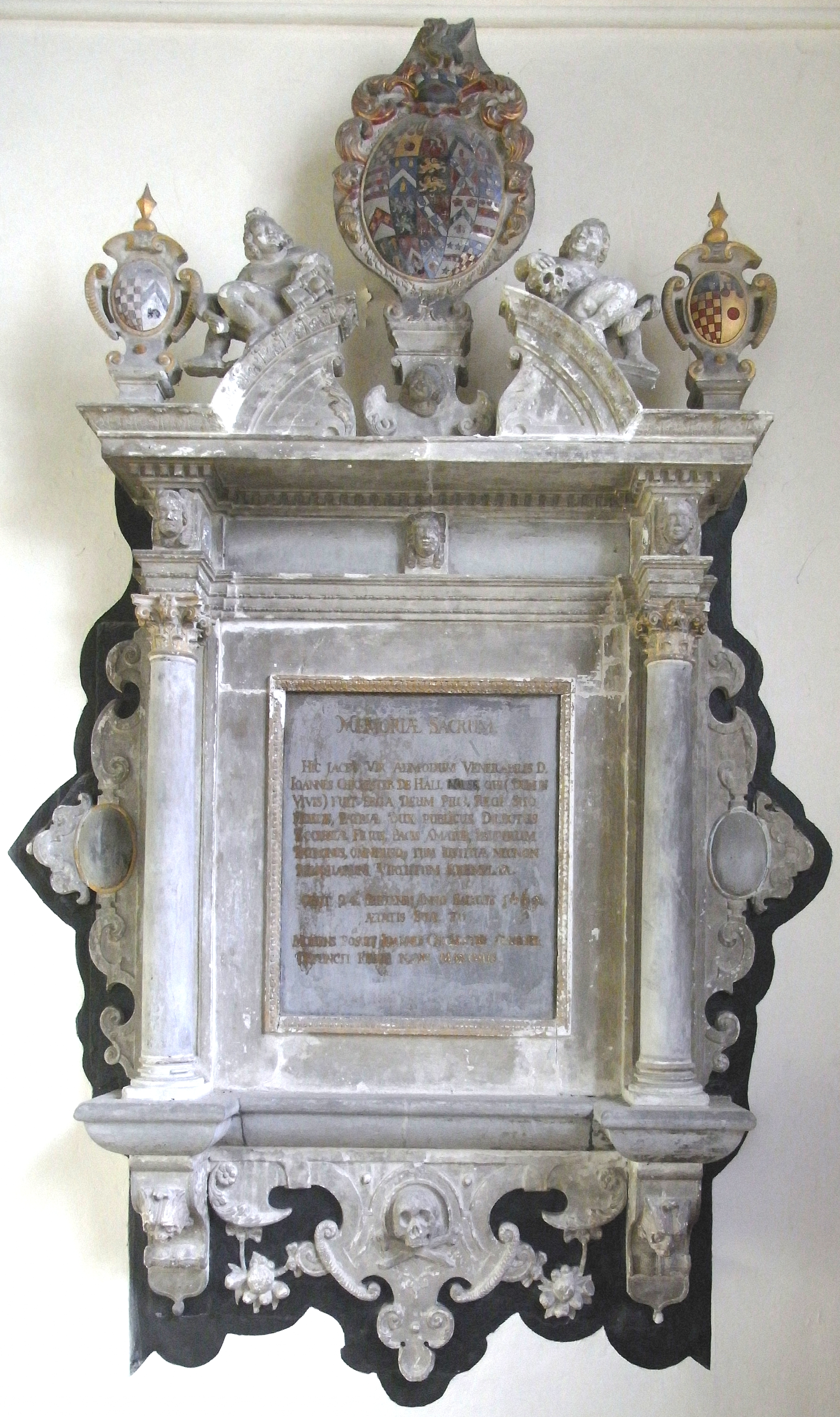
Mural monument to Sir John Chichester (d. 1669), Bishop's Tawton Church, north wall of chancel

A baroque mural monument exists in Bishop's Tawton Church to Sir John Chichester (d. 1669), on top of which in the centre is shown an escutcheon of twenty quarterings with on the dexter the arms of Chichester impaling Strode, with on the sinister, more recently restored, Chichester impaling Courtenay (perhaps of Powderham or of Molland), with which families no close connection of his is recorded and which is therefore inexplicable. In this position might be expected to have been placed the arms of one of his later wives, Pollard or Stevens. The Latin inscription is as follows:

Memoriae Sacrum. Hic jacet vir admodum venerabilis D(ominus) Jo(h)annes Chichester de Hall, Eques, qui (dum in vivis) fuit erga deum pius, regi suo fidelis, patriae dux publicus dilectus, ecclesiae filius, pacis amator, pauperum patronus, omnibusq(ue) tum justitiae necnon reliquarum virtutum exemplar. Obiit 24.o Septemb(ri) Anno Salutis 1669. Maerens posuit Jo(h)annes Chichester, Armiger, defuncti filius natu maximus ("Sacred to the Memory. Here lies a man altogether venerable, Sir John Chichester, Knight, who (whilst amongst the living) was towards God pious, to his king faithful, to his country a beloved public leader, to the Church a son, to peace a lover, to the poor a patron and in everything as to justice, and certainly of the rest of the virtues, an example. He died on the 24th of September in the Year of the Redemption 1669. John Chichester, Esquire, the eldest son of the deceased, mourning, erected this")

==== Quarterings ====
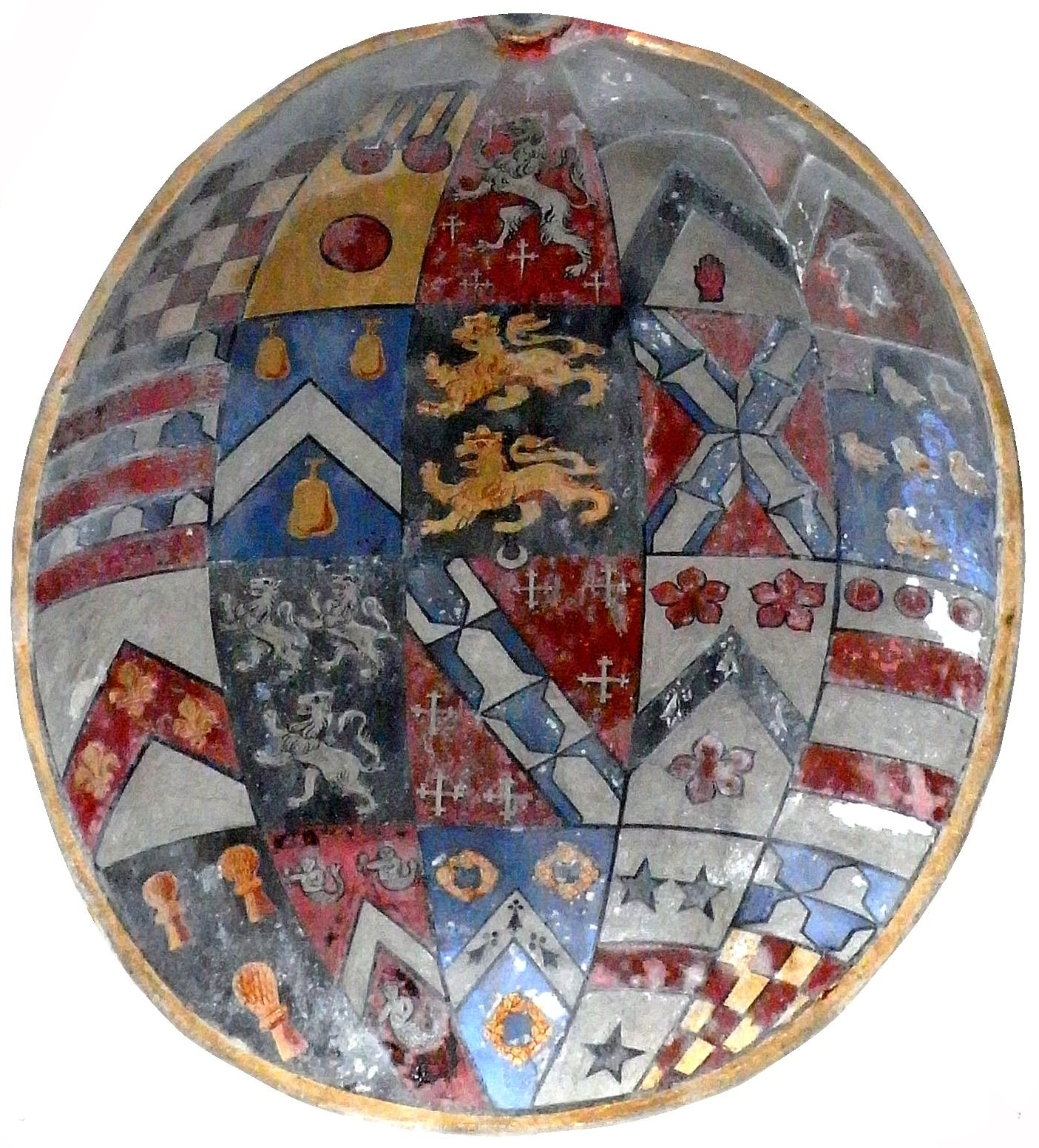
Heraldic cartouche of 20 quarterings on mural monument to Sir John Chichester (d. 1669) of Hall

At the top of the mural monument to Sir John Chichester (d. 1669) is an oval heraldic cartouche supported by two putti with the crest of Chichester above. The cartouche shows the following 20 quarters:
1: Chequy or and gules a chief vair (Chichester)
2: Or, three torteaux a label of three points azure (Courtenay)
3: Gules semé of crosses crosslet fitché, a lion rampant argent
4: Argent, a fess between two chevrons sable in base the Red Hand of Ulster
5: Gules, a chevron between three goat's heads erased ermine attired or (Marwood of Westcot, Marwood)
6: Barry of six vair and gules (Beaumont of Youlstone, Shirwell)
7: Azure, a chevron argent between three pears or (Orchard)
8: Sable, two lions passant crowned or (Dymock, a Wotton heiress)
9: Gules, a saltire vair (Willington of Umberleigh)
10: Azure, seven martlets or on a canton (sable?) a mullet (gules?)
11: Argent, on a chevron gules three fleurs-de-lis or
12: Sable semée of cross-crosslets or, three lions rampant argent alias Sable crusily or, three lions rampant argent (Wotton of Widworthy)
13: Gules crusilly or, a bend vair (Raleigh of Raleigh, Pilton, with crescent for difference; erroneous arms)
14: Argent, a chevron counter-ermine between three cinquefoils gules (de Hall)
15: Argent, two bars gules in chief three torteaux (Mules/Moels of Halmeston, Bishops Tawton)
16: Sable, three garbs or
17: Gules, a chevron between three mermaids each holding a mirror in her right hand and a comb in her left argent (Gough of Aldercombe)
18: Azure, a chevron ermine between three chaplets or (Clotworthy)
19: Argent, a fess gules between three mullets sable
20: Chequy or and gules a chief vair (Chichester)

==== Monument to first wife ====
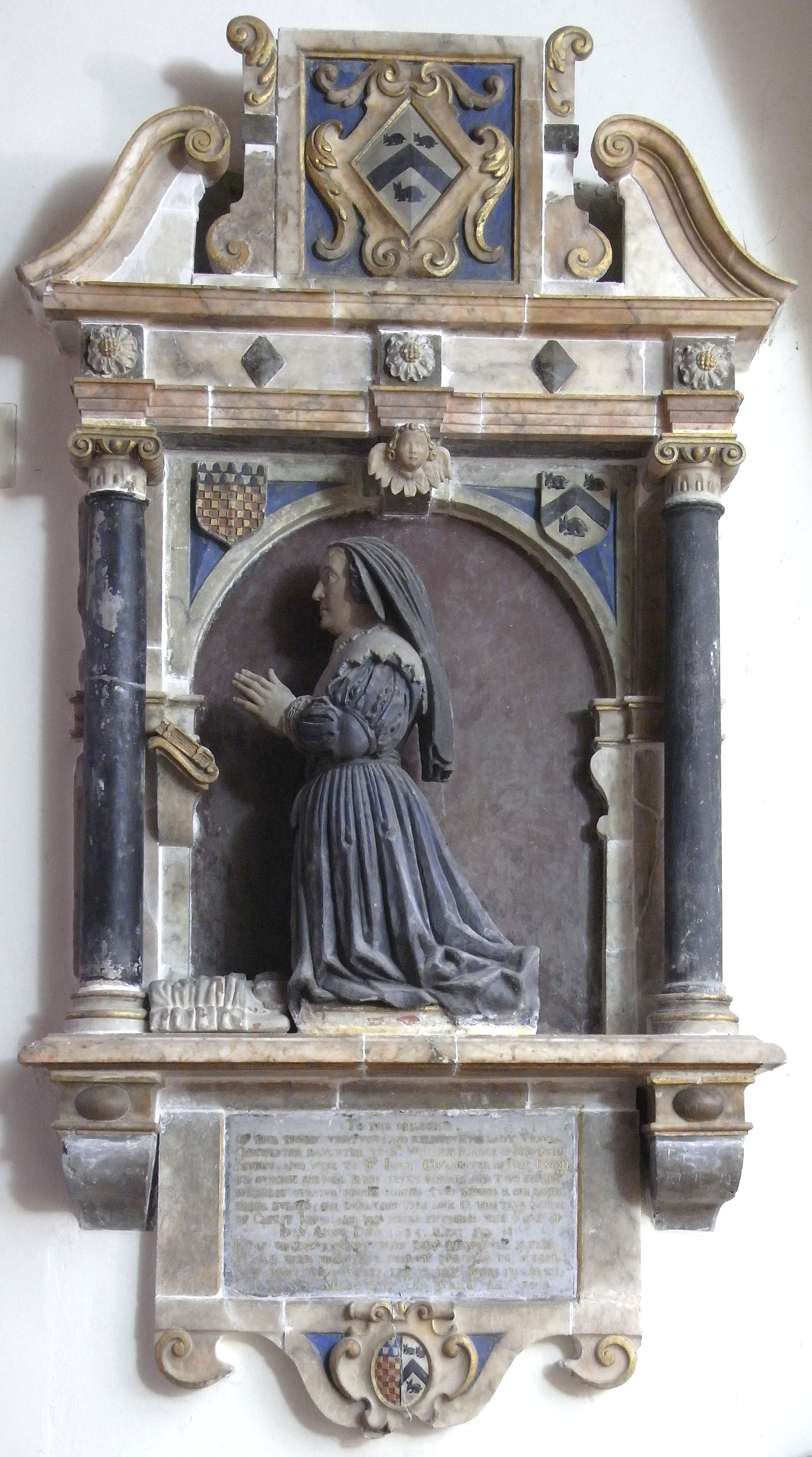
Mural monument to Ursula Strode (d. 1635), 1st wife of Sir John Chichester (d. 1669) of Hall. South wall of chancel, Bishop's Tawton Church

There exists on the south wall of the choir in Bishop's Tawton Church a Baroque mural monument to Ursula Strode, Lady Chichester, showing her effigy kneeling at a prie dieu with two babies side-by-side wrapped in swaddling clothes in front of her. At the top within an elaborate gilded frame within a broken pediment is a lozenge showing the arms of Strode: Argent, a chevron between three conies courant sable. On the arch above her is shown on the dexter the arms of Chichester and on the sinister the arms of Strode. Below underneath an inscribed tablet is a cartouche bearing the arms of Chichester impaling Strode. The tablet is inscribed as follows:

"To the memorie of the truly vertuous and religious the Lady Ursula Chichester daughter to Sr. William Strode of Newingeam, Knight, and wife to Sr. John Chichester of Hall, Knight, by whome she had issue seven sonnes and two daughters whereof survive fower sonnes, two sonnes & one daught. heere buried. She departed this life in the true faith of Christ Jesus and was heere enterred the 6th (5th?) day of July Anno D(omi)ni 1635 aetat(is) suae (47?).

Fayre virtuous sainct injoy thy peaceful sleepe,
While wee that live employ our foes to weepe,
But when thou wak'st let glory shew thy grace,
Let Heav'n, which only can, enrich thy face."

=== John Chichester (1626–1684) ===
John Chichester (1626–1684), (eldest son by Ursula Strode), who died childless and was buried at Bath Abbey, where exists a monument to his memory.

=== Francis Chichester (1628–1698) ===
Francis Chichester (1628–1698) (brother), died childless.

=== Arthur Chichester (1670–1737/8) ===
Arthur Chichester (1670–1737/8) (cousin), of Pill, a house immediately north of the village of Bishop's Tawton. He was the eldest son and heir of Arthur Chichester (d. 1682) of Stowford (whose monument exists in Swimbridge Church) by his wife "Mary". Arthur's father was Arthur Chichester (1612–1687) of Stowford, the eldest son and heir of Hugh Chichester (1574–1644) of Tavistock, the eighth son of John Chichester (d. 1596) of Hall. Arthur's younger brother Henry Chichester (1678–1730) of Stowford, married his cousin Susannah Chichester (1665–1707/8), the daughter of Sir John Chichester (1598–1669) of Hall by his second wife Elizabeth Pollard. A monument to Susannah exists in Swimbridge Church. Arthur married twice:

- Firstly to Jane Arundell (d. 1717), daughter of John Harris Arundell of Wortham. He was predeceased by his eldest son from this marriage, Arthur Chichester (1698–1725), but not before he had married in 1719 Catherine Harward (d. 1725), daughter of Rev. Charles Harward, Dean of Exeter, and produced a son and heir Charles Chichester (1722/3–1798)

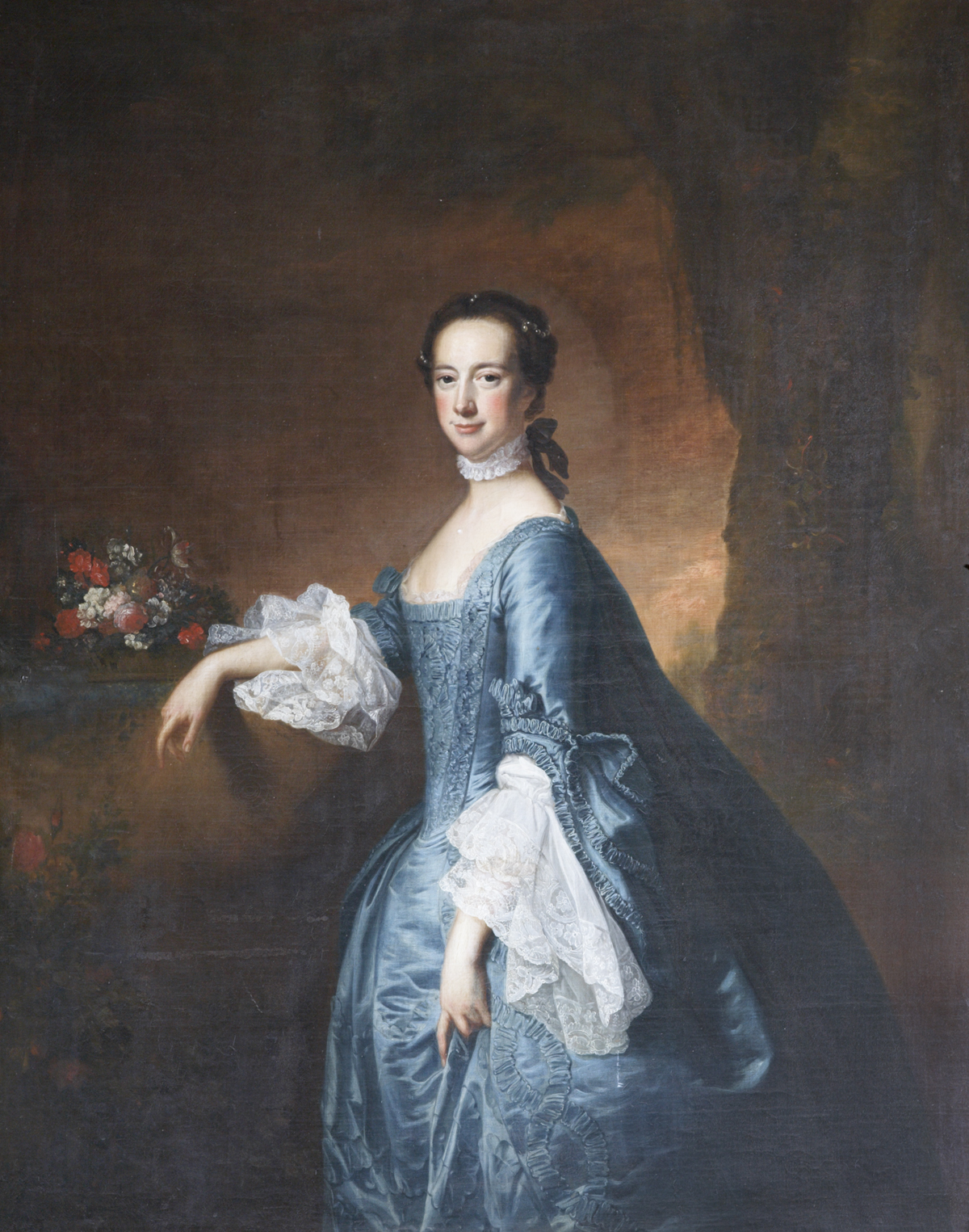
Anne Chichester (1721–1781), a daughter of Arthur Chichester (1670–1737/8) of Hall and wife of Denys Rolle (1725–1797) of Stevenstone. Portrait by Thomas Hudson (1701–1779); Collection of Great Torrington Almshouse, Town Lands and Poors Charities, formerly the property of Hon. Mark Rolle (d. 1907) of Stevenstone and donated by his heir Lord Clinton

- Secondly in 1717 to Dorothy Rowe (d. 1743), by whom he had 3 sons and two daughters. His daughter Anne Chichester (1721–1781) married Denys Rolle (1725–1797), the eventual heir to Stevenstone and the largest land-owner in Devon. Matching portraits of Anne and Denys Rolle by Thomas Hudson (1701–79) survive in the collection of Great Torrington Town Hall. Their son was John Rolle, 1st Baron Rolle (1750–1842), of Stevenstone and Bicton.

=== Charles Chichester (1722/3–1798) ===
Charles Chichester (1722/3–1798) (grandson), who married in 1747 Amy Incledon (d. 1782), eldest daughter of Robert Incledon (1676–1758) of Pilton House, Pilton, near Barnstaple, Deputy Recorder of Barnstaple and twice Mayor of Barnstaple, in 1712 and 1721, and sister of Benjamin Incledon (1730–1796) "The Antiquarian" of Pilton House. The Incledons were a prominent family which originated in the 12th century at the estate of Incledon in Braunton and which acquired in 1319 the nearby estate of Buckland which they made their seat. Buckland House is today still owned and occupied by descendants of the Incledons.

=== Charles Chichester (1749/50–1835) ===
Charles Chichester (1749/50–1835), (son) who married in 1799 Henrietta Webber (d. 1835), 7th daughter of Philip Rogers Webber (d. 1819) of Barnstaple, later of Buckland House, by his wife Mary Incledon (1736–1802), the eventual sole-heiress of her father John Incledon (1702–1746) of Buckland House in the parish of Braunton, first cousin of Amy Incledon. Charles's daughter Henrietta Chichester (1809–1884) married her cousin Charles Henry Webber (1810–1883), of Buckland, an officer in the Indian Army, whose son and heir was Edward Chichester Incledon-Webber (b. 1837) of Buckland House. In 2013 the Webber family descended from this line continues to reside at Buckland and are nominally lords of the manor of Braunton.

=== Robert Chichester (b. 1804) ===
Robert Chichester (b. 1804) (3rd son and heir), married Clarentia Mason, only surviving daughter of Col. Henry Mason of the Indian Army, of Chichester in Surrey (which town by some accounts was the most ancient dwelling of the Chichesters of Devon). His 4th son was Major General Hugh Chichester (1836–1896), JP, of the Royal Bengal Artillery, resident at Pilton House, Pilton (next to the old family seat of Raleigh) in 1893.

=== Charles Chichester (b. 1828) ===
Charles Chichester (b. 1828), JP, Deputy Lieutenant of Devon, who married in 1870 his distant cousin Beatrice Chichester (b. 1850), the eldest daughter by his first wife of Sir Arthur Chichester, 8th Baronet (1822–1898), of Youlston, the representative of the senior Raleigh line. Sir Arthur's second wife was Rosalie Chamberlayne, the widow of his cousin from the Arlington branch, Sir Alexander Palmer Bruce Chichester, 2nd Baronet (1842–1881). Thus in this generation the three then surviving branches of the family were brought together in kinship.
