= Walter Reynell =

Walter Reynell may refer to:

- Walter Reynell (fl.1404), Member of Parliament for Devon in 1404
- Walter Reynell (died 1478), Member of Parliament for Devon in 1454/5
