= John Fowell =

John Fowell may refer to

- Sir John Fowell, 2nd Baronet, English politician
- Sir John Fowell, 3rd Baronet, English politician

== See also ==
- Fowell (surname)
