= Fowell =

Fowell is a surname. Notable people with the surname include:

- Edmund Fowell (c.1598–1664), English politician
- Sir Edmund Fowell, 1st Baronet
- John Fowell (disambiguation), multiple people
- Joseph Fowell, Australian architect
- Fowell baronets
