= The Hound of the Baskervilles =

1902 crime detective novel by Arthur Conan Doyle

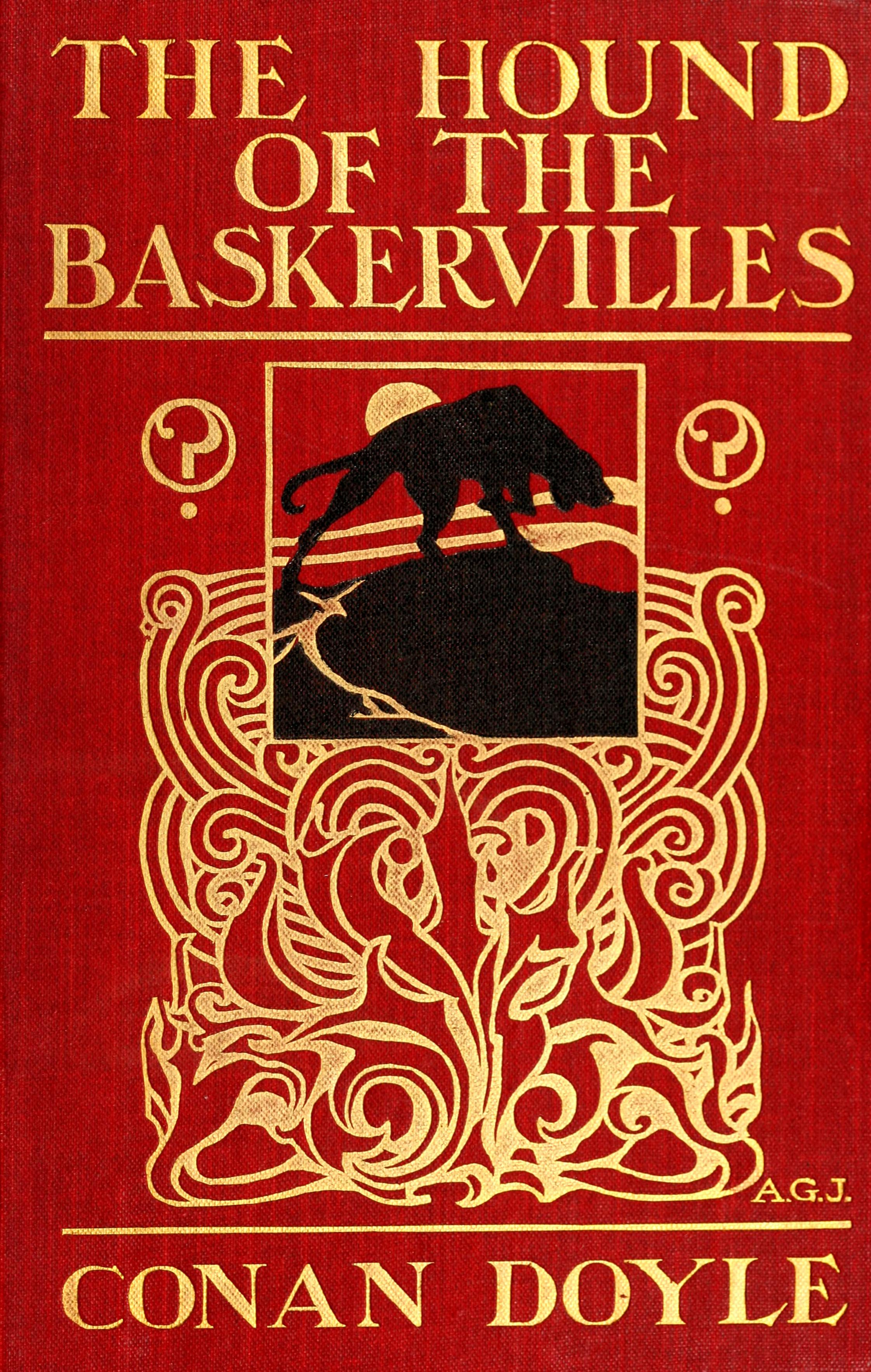
- The cover of the first edition
- Author: Arthur Conan Doyle
- Illustrator: Sidney Paget
- Cover artist: Alfred Garth Jones
- Language: English
- Series: Sherlock Holmes
- Genre: Detective fiction, Gothic fiction
- Publisher: George Newnes Ltd
- Publication date: 25 March 1902
- Publication place: United Kingdom
- Preceded by: The Memoirs of Sherlock Holmes
- Followed by: The Return of Sherlock Holmes
- Text: The Hound of the Baskervilles at Wikisource

The Hound of the Baskervilles is the third of the four crime novels by British writer Arthur Conan Doyle featuring the detective Sherlock Holmes. Originally serialised in The Strand Magazine from August 1901 to April 1902, it is set largely on Dartmoor, Devon, in England's West Country and follows Holmes and Watson investigating the legend of a fearsome, diabolical hound of supernatural origin. This was the first appearance of Holmes since his apparent death in The Final Problem and the success of The Hound of the Baskervilles led to the character's eventual revival.

One of the most famous stories ever written, in 2003 the book was listed as number 128 of 200 on the BBC's The Big Read poll of the UK's "best-loved novel". In 1999 a poll of "Sherlockians" ranked it as the best of the four Holmes novels.

== Plot ==
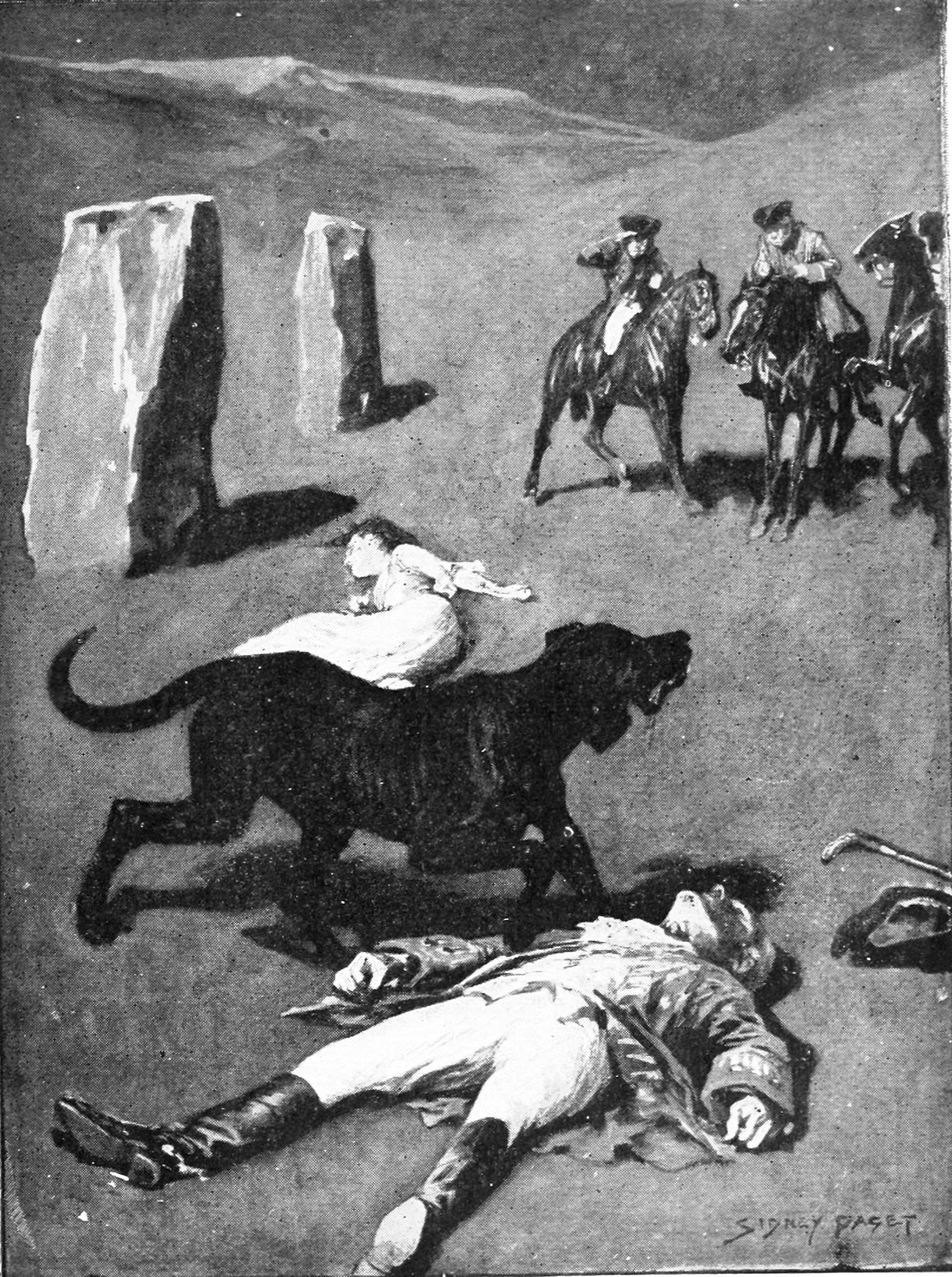
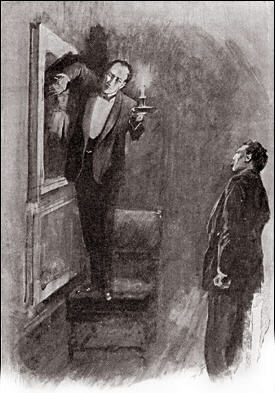
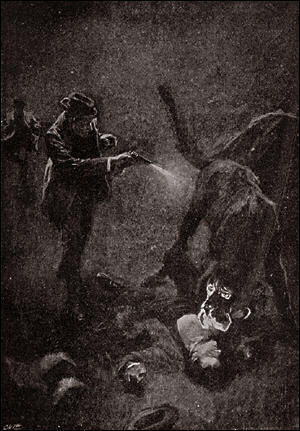
From left: the legend of the hound; Holmes spotting a clue in the portrait; and the death of the hound

In London, 1889, Sherlock Holmes and John Watson are visited by a Dr James Mortimer, asking for the aid of Holmes, beginning by reading him a legend that has run in the Baskerville family since the time of the English Civil War, when Sir Hugo Baskerville kidnapped a farmer's daughter. When the girl escaped Hugo pursued her, swearing a curse upon himself in his mad rage. Hugo's companions witnessed the girl dead of fear and Hugo killed by a demonic hound that is said to have haunted Dartmoor ever since, causing the premature death of many Baskervilles. Mortimer further explains that his friend, the philanthropic baronet Sir Charles Baskerville, who took the legend very seriously and had a weak heart, had resided at Baskerville Hall after amassing a fortune in South Africa. When the baronet's body was found in a yew alley, with an expression of horror on his face, the death was attributed to cardiac arrest; however Mortimer had noticed large canine paw prints near the body. Sir Charles had been the eldest of three Baskerville brothers and Sir Henry, the Canadian son of the deceased second brother, is Sir Charles' heir. The rather immoral third brother, Rodger, died of yellow fever in South America in 1876. Mortimer, the executor of Sir Charles' will, fears it might not be wise to bring Sir Henry to Dartmoor in light of the possible supernatural dangers.

Though Holmes dismisses the legend as a fairy tale he meets Sir Henry when the new baronet arrives in London. It transpires that strange things are already happening to Sir Henry; one of his old boots has been stolen, he has received an anonymous letter warning him against the moor, and someone has been following him in a hansom. Mortimer reveals that Sir Henry's inheritance is about £740,000 (equivalent to £82,000,000 in 2025); in view of these high stakes Holmes asks Watson to act as Sir Henry's bodyguard and to investigate things on Dartmoor. Upon arriving in Dartmoor, Watson, Mortimer and Sir Henry learn that Selden, a convicted murderer, has escaped from Princetown Prison and is loose on the moor. At Baskerville Hall they are introduced to John and Eliza Barrymore, the married butler and housekeeper. Watson sends detailed accounts of his investigations to Holmes, particularly focusing on the local residents. The Stapleton siblings stand out; Jack is over-friendly, drops hints about the hound, and warns Watson against attempting to cross the dangerous Grimpen Mire. His sister, Beryl, without his knowledge, repeatedly tries to get Sir Henry to flee back to London. Another neighbour, Mr Frankland, is a perpetual busybody and troublemaker, including threatening to bring a lawsuit against Dr Mortimer for excavating nearby barrows. Sir Henry falls in love with Beryl Stapleton, though her brother strongly objects to the romance.

Barrymore repeatedly sends candlelight signals to someone on the moor. Following Barrymore one night, Watson and Sir Henry discover that Selden is Mrs Barrymore's younger brother and that she and her husband have been leaving food out for him. During an unsuccessful attempt to catch Selden Watson sees a strange man standing on a tor.

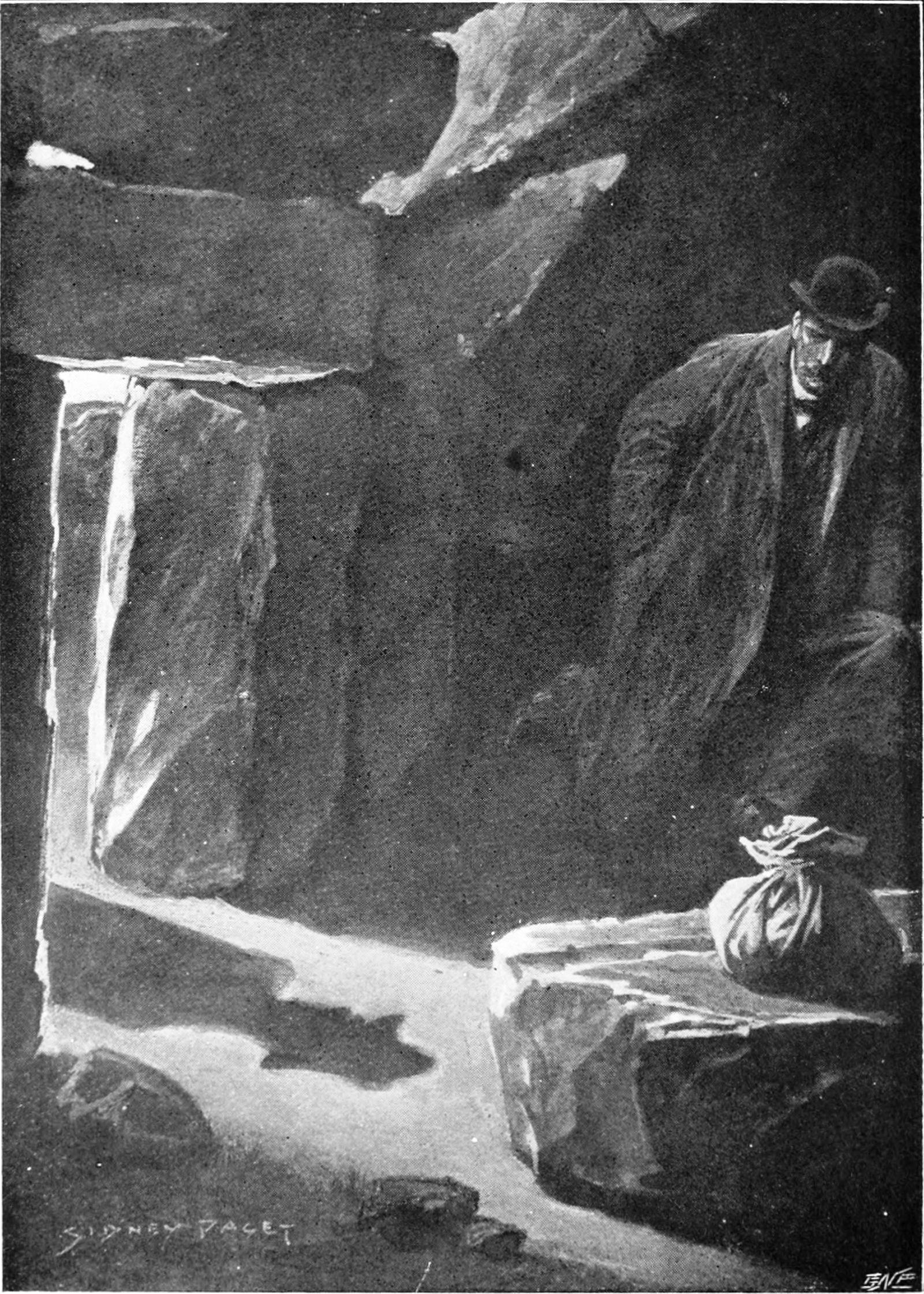
Frontispiece to The Hound of the Baskervilles first edition: "The Shadow of Sherlock Holmes" (Watson investigates the hut where a mysterious figure is living secretly on the moor–only to discover it is Sherlock Holmes, who was supposedly back in London (Chapters 11 and 12))

Watson and Sir Henry learn from Barrymore that Frankland's estranged daughter, Laura Lyons, had once written to Sir Charles. After a failed attempt to interrogate Laura, Watson investigates the man on the tor and discovers that it is Holmes, who has been investigating in secret to hide his direct involvement. Holmes reveals that Jack Stapleton is the murderer, and Beryl is actually his wife, abused and forced into posing as his sister; however, Holmes does not have enough proof to convince the authorities. Holmes and Watson fear they hear Sir Henry fleeing from a baying hound, and falling from a cliff; they find the dying man is Selden; Barrymore had given Selden Sir Henry's discarded clothes, and Stapleton's hound, having been set on the trail with Sir Henry's stolen boot, had confused the scent. At Baskerville Hall, Holmes reveals to Watson that the portrait of Sir Hugo Baskerville bears a remarkable resemblance to Stapleton.

Holmes decides to use an unwitting Sir Henry as bait; he orders him to visit Stapleton that evening, and then walk across the moor on foot. Holmes and Watson then pretend to leave for London, but instead hide near Stapleton's house with Inspector Lestrade of Scotland Yard. Despite thick fog, they manage to kill the hound when Stapleton unleashes it after Sir Henry. They go to Stapleton's house to find he has bound his wife to a column and vanished into the mire, where he is presumed to have drowned.

After Sir Henry and Dr Mortimer depart on a sea voyage, to repair the baronet's shattered nerves, Holmes explains to Watson that Stapleton was really Rodger Baskerville II, the secret son of Sir Charles' youngest brother. A physical and spiritual throwback to Sir Hugo, Rodger II had bought a savage black hound and painted it with phosphorus to make it look diabolical; either by fright or direct attack, he hoped the dog would remove all the other heirs so that he could inherit the Baskerville fortune. He had promised Laura to help her divorce her estranged husband and then marry her himself and thus perasuaded her to lure Sir Charles out of his house on the night of the murder. Intending to save Sir Henry, Beryl had sent the anonymous letter to him to thwart her husband's further schemes. Holmes remarks that he considers Stapleton one of his most cunning adversaries.

== Origins and background ==
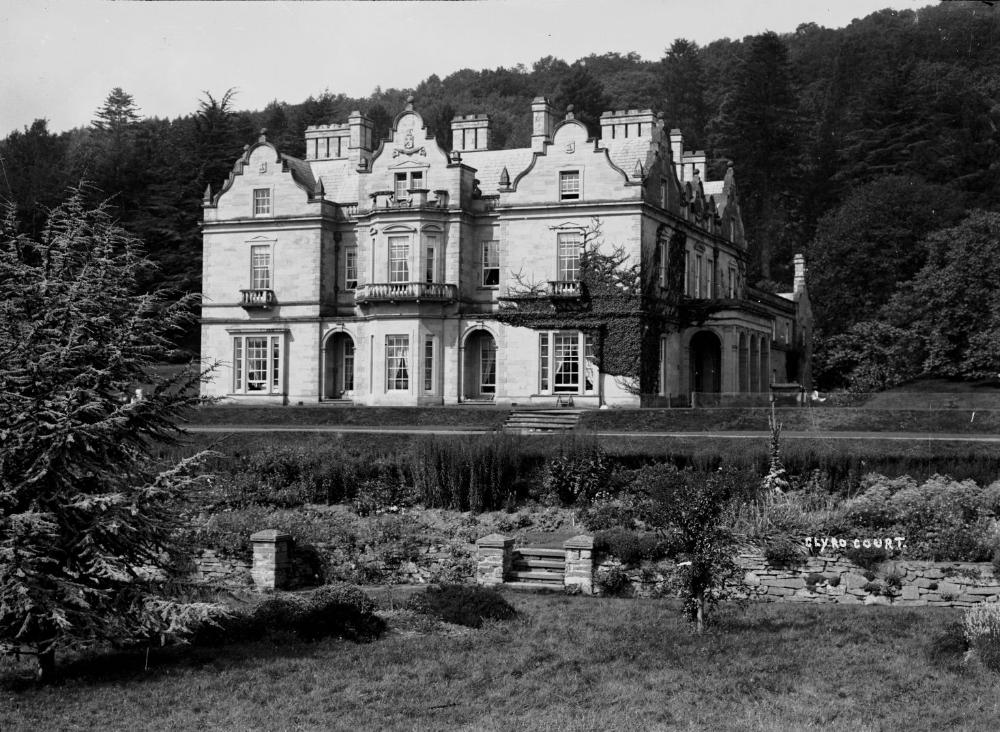
Baskerville Hall, formally Clyro Court, may have inspired The Hound of the Baskervilles

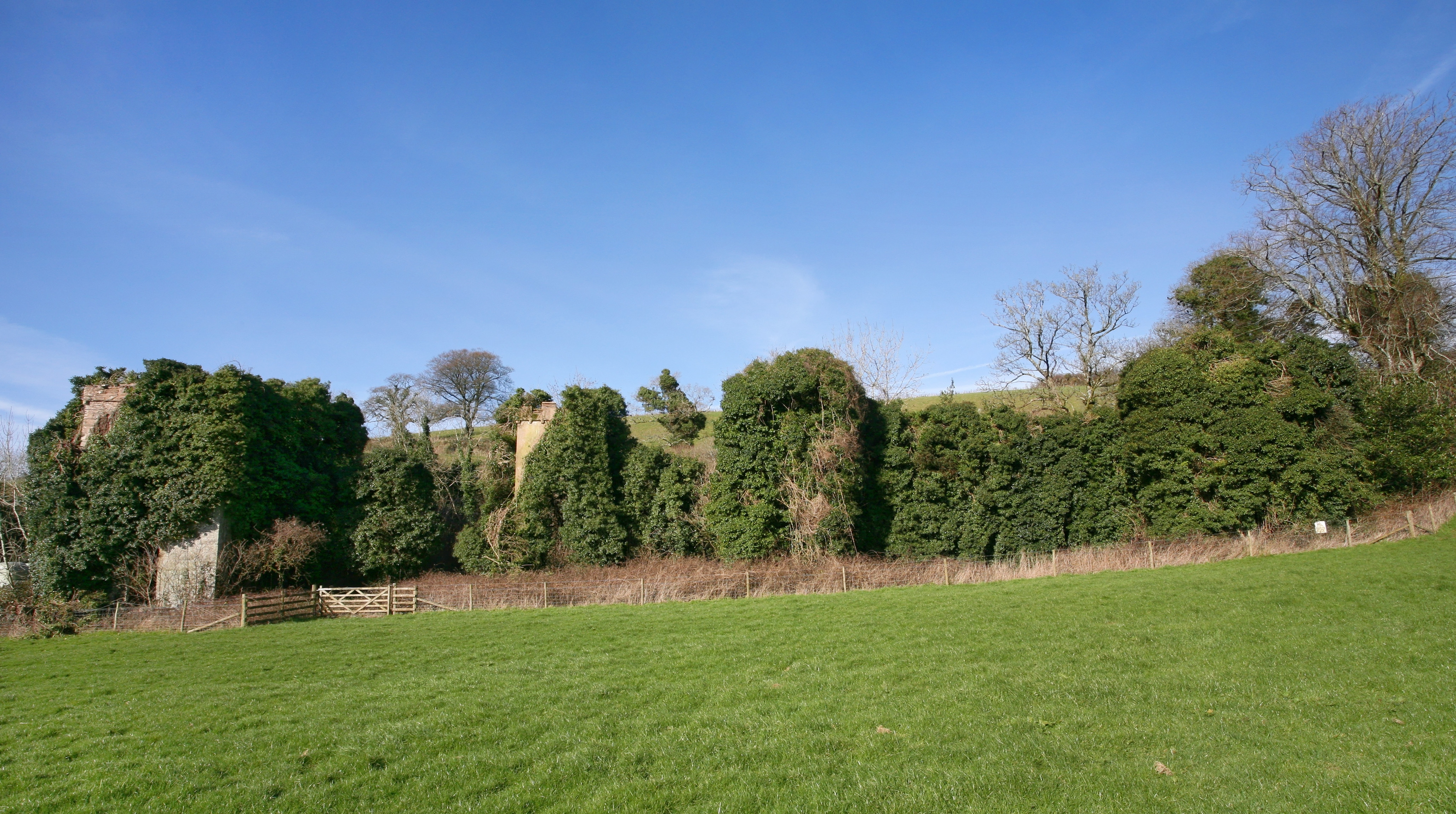
The ruins of Fowelscombe House, a possible model for Baskerville Hall

Sir Arthur Conan Doyle wrote this story shortly after returning to his home, Undershaw, in Surrey, from South Africa, where he had worked as a volunteer physician at the Langman Field Hospital in Bloemfontein during the Second Boer War. He had not written about Sherlock Holmes in eight years, having killed off the character in the 1893 story "The Final Problem". Although The Hound of the Baskervilles is set before the latter events, two years later Doyle brought Holmes back for good, explaining in The Adventure of the Empty House that Holmes had faked his own death. As a result the character of Holmes occupies a liminal space between being alive and dead, which further adds to the gothic elements of the novel.

Doyle was assisted with the legend of the hound and local colour by a Daily Express journalist named Bertram Fletcher Robinson (1870–1907), with whom he explored Dartmoor in June 1901; Robinson received a 1/3 royalty payment that amounted to over 500 pounds by the end of 1901 (equivalent to £50,900 in 2023).

Doyle may also have been inspired by his own earlier story (written and published in 1898) of a terrifying giant wolf, "The King of the Foxes", and by his story of a big cat, "The Brazilian Cat" (also published 1898).

== Inspiration ==
The author’s ideas came from the legend of Squire Richard Cabell of Brook Hall, in the parish of Buckfastleigh, Devon, which was the fundamental inspiration for the Baskerville tale of a hellish hound and a cursed country squire. Cabell's tomb survives in the town of Buckfastleigh.

Cabell lived for hunting, and was what in those days was described as a "monstrously evil man". He gained this reputation, among other things, for immorality and having sold his soul to the Devil. There was also a rumour that he had murdered his wife, Elizabeth Fowell, a daughter of Sir Edmund Fowell, 1st Baronet (1593–1674), of Fowelscombe. On 5 July 1677, he died and was buried in the sepulchre. The night of his interment saw a phantom pack of hounds come baying across the moor to howl at his tomb. From that night on, he could be found leading the phantom pack across the moor, usually on the anniversary of his death. If the pack were not out hunting, they could be found ranging around his grave howling and shrieking. To try to lay the soul to rest, the villagers built a large building around the tomb, and to be doubly sure a huge slab was placed over the top.

Moreover, Devon's folklore includes tales of a fearsome supernatural dog known as the Yeth hound that Doyle may have heard.

Weller (2002) believes that Baskerville Hall is based on one of three possible houses on or near Dartmoor: Fowelscombe in the parish of Ugborough, the seat of the Fowell Baronets; Hayford Hall, near Buckfastleigh (also owned by John King (d.1861) of Fowelscombe) and Brook Hall, in the parish of Buckfastleigh, about two miles east of Hayford, the actual home of Richard Cabell. It has also been claimed that Baskerville Hall is based on a property in Clyro, Wales, built in 1839 by one Thomas Baskerville Mynors Baskerville. The house was formerly named Clyro Court and was renamed Baskerville Hall towards the end of the 19th century. Arthur Conan Doyle was apparently a family friend who often stayed there and may have been aware of a local legend of the hound of the Baskervilles.

Still other tales claim that Doyle was inspired by a holiday in North Norfolk, where the tale of the hellhound Black Shuck is well known. The Gothic-revival style Cromer Hall, where Doyle and Robinson stayed with Benjamin Cabell in 1901 also closely resembles Doyle's vivid descriptions of Baskerville Hall. Another suggestion is that Archibald Primrose, 5th Earl of Rosebery, whose home was Dalmeny House, told Arthur Conan Doyle that a hound barked mournfully during the night of the death of his wife Hannah, in accordance with a Dalmeny legend that hearing a hound portended a dynastic tragedy.

James Lynam Molloy, a friend of Doyle's, and author of "Love's Old Sweet Song", married Florence Baskerville, daughter of Henry Baskerville of Crowsley Park, Oxfordshire. The gates to the park had statues of hell hounds, spears through their mouths. Above the lintel there was another statue of a hell hound.

== Technique ==
The novel incorporates five plots: the ostensible 'curse' story, the two red-herring subplots concerning Selden and the other stranger living on the moor, the actual events occurring to Baskerville as narrated by Watson, and the hidden plot to be discovered by Holmes. The structure of the novel starting and ending in the familiar setting in London is used to ‘delimit the uncanny world associated with the Gothic landscape of the moors', with varying degrees of success. Doyle wrote that the novel was originally conceived as a straight 'Victorian creeper' in the style of Le Fanu, with the idea of introducing Holmes as the deus ex machina arising only later.

== Publication ==
The Hound of the Baskervilles was first serialised in The Strand Magazine in 1901. It was well-suited for this type of publication, as individual chapters end in cliffhangers. It was printed in the United Kingdom as a novel in March 1902 by George Newnes Ltd. It was published in the same year in the United States by McClure, Philips & Co.

=== Original manuscript ===
In 1902, Doyle's original manuscript of the book was broken up into individual leaves as part of a promotional campaign by Doyle's American publisher – they were used in window displays by individual booksellers. Out of an estimated 185–190 leaves, only 37 are known to still exist, including all the leaves from Chapter 11, held by the New York Public Library. (Note: The New York Public Library also owns the manuscripts for the Sherlock Holmes short stories, "The Adventure of the Norwood Builder", "The Adventure of the Devil's Foot" and "The Adventure of the Blanched Soldier".) Other leaves are owned by university libraries in the United States and by private collectors. Four of the known survivors are in unknown locations, including one that was stolen.

A newly rediscovered example was sold at auction in 2012 for US$158,500. Another one was sold in 2021 for $423,000. The existence of the 37th leaf became publicly known in 2018; it was put up for auction in 2022, but did not sell.

== Adaptations ==
The Hound of the Baskervilles has been adapted in various forms of media.

=== Film and television adaptations ===
Over 20 film and television versions of The Hound of the Baskervilles have been made.

Year	Title	Country	Director	Holmes	Watson
1914	Der Hund von Baskerville	Germany	Rudolf Meinert	Alwin Neuß	?
1921	The Hound of the Baskervilles	United Kingdom	Maurice Elvey	Eille Norwood	Hubert Willis
1929	Der Hund von Baskerville	Germany	Richard Oswald	Carlyle Blackwell	George Seroff
1932	The Hound of the Baskervilles	United Kingdom	Gareth Gundrey	Robert Rendel	Frederick Lloyd
1937	The Hound of the Baskervilles	Germany	Carl Lamac	Bruno Güttner	Fritz Odemar
1939	The Hound of the Baskervilles	United States	Sidney Lanfield	Basil Rathbone	Nigel Bruce
1951	Jighansa	India	Ajoy Kar	Shishir Batabyal as Smarajit Sen	Gautam Mukherjee as Bimal Ganguly
1955	Der Hund von Baskerville	West Germany	Fritz Umgelter	Wolf Ackva	Arnulf Schröder
1959	The Hound of the Baskervilles	United Kingdom	Terence Fisher	Peter Cushing	André Morell
1962	Bees Saal Baad(based on H. K. Roy's Nishachari Bibhishika, the Bengali adaptation of The Hound of the Baskervilles)	India	Biren Nag	Asit Sen as Detective Gopichand	–
1968	Sherlock Holmes – "The Hound of the Baskervilles"	United Kingdom	Graham Evans	Peter Cushing	Nigel Stock
1968	Sherlock Holmes – "L'ultimo dei Baskerville"	Italy	Guglielmo Morandi	Nando Gazzolo	Gianni Bonagura
1971	The Hound of the Baskervilles (Собака Баскервилей)	Soviet Union	A.F. Zinovieva	Nikolay Volkov	Lev Krugliy
1972	The Hound of the Baskervilles	United States	Barry Crane	Stewart Granger	Bernard Fox
1978	The Hound of the Baskervilles	United Kingdom	Paul Morrissey	Peter Cook	Dudley Moore
1981	The Hound of the Baskervilles (Собака Баскервилей)	Soviet Union	Igor Maslennikov	Vasily Livanov	Vitaly Solomin
1982	The Hound of the Baskervilles	United Kingdom	Peter Duguid	Tom Baker	Terence Rigby
1983	The Hound of the Baskervilles	United Kingdom	Douglas Hickox	Ian Richardson	Donald Churchill
1983	Sherlock Holmes and the Baskerville Curse	Australia	Ian McKenzie & Alex Nicholas	Peter O'Toole (voice)	Earle Cross (voice)
1988	The Return of Sherlock Holmes – "The Hound of the Baskervilles"	United Kingdom	Brian Mills	Jeremy Brett	Edward Hardwicke
1995	Wishbone – "The Slobbery Hound"	United States	Fred Holmes	"Wishbone" (Soccer the Dog, voice of Larry Brantley)	Ric Speigel
1999	Sherlock Holmes in the 22nd Century – "The Hounds of the Baskervilles"	United States; United Kingdom	Robert Brousseau, Scott Heming	Jason Gray-Stanford	John Payne
2000	The Hound of the Baskervilles	Canada	Rodney Gibbons	Matt Frewer	Kenneth Welsh
2002	The Hound of the Baskervilles	United Kingdom	David Attwood	Richard Roxburgh	Ian Hart
2012	Sherlock – "The Hounds of Baskerville"	United Kingdom	Paul McGuigan	Benedict Cumberbatch	Martin Freeman
2015	The Adventure of Henry Baskerville and a Dog (Basukāviru kun to inu no bōken, バスカーヴィル君と犬の冒険)	Japan	Michiyo Morita	Kōichi Yamadera (voice)	Wataru Takagi (voice)
2015	Sherloch – "The Cat of the Baskervilles" (Шерлох – "Кішка Баскервілів")	Ukraine	Kyrylo Bin	Evgen Koshevyy	Yuriy Krapov
2014	Elementary – "The Hound of the Cancer Cells"	United States	Michael Slovis	Jonny Lee Miller	Lucy Liu
2016	Elementary – "Hounded"	United States	Robert Hewitt Wolfe	Jonny Lee Miller	Lucy Liu
2025	Saralakkha Holmes	India	Sayantan Ghosal	Rishav Basu	Gaurav Chakraborty

=== Audio ===
Edith Meiser adapted the novel as six episodes of the radio series The Adventures of Sherlock Holmes. The episodes aired in February and March 1932, with Richard Gordon as Sherlock Holmes and Leigh Lovell as Dr. Watson. Another dramatisation of the story aired in November and December 1936, with Gordon as Holmes and Harry West as Watson.

The story was also adapted by Meiser as six episodes of The New Adventures of Sherlock Holmes with Basil Rathbone as Holmes and Nigel Bruce as Watson. The episodes aired in January and February 1941.

A dramatisation of the novel by Felix Felton aired on the BBC Light Programme in 1958 as part of the 1952–1969 radio series, with Carleton Hobbs as Sherlock Holmes and Norman Shelley as Dr. Watson. A different production of The Hound of the Baskervilles, also adapted by Felton and starring Hobbs and Shelley with a different supporting cast, aired in 1961 on the BBC Home Service.

The novel was adapted as an episode of CBS Radio Mystery Theater. The episode, which aired in 1977, starred Kevin McCarthy as Holmes and Lloyd Battista as Watson.

The Hound of the Baskervilles has been adapted for radio for the BBC by Bert Coules on two occasions. The first starred Roger Rees as Holmes, Crawford Logan as Watson and Matt Zimmerman as Sir Henry and was broadcast in 1988 on BBC Radio 4. Following its good reception, Coules proposed further radio adaptations, which eventually led to the 1989–1998 radio series of dramatisations of the entire canon, starring Clive Merrison as Holmes and Michael Williams as Watson. The second adaptation of The Hound of the Baskervilles, featuring this pairing, was broadcast in 1998, and also featured Judi Dench as Mrs. Hudson and Donald Sinden as Sir Charles Baskerville.

Clive Nolan and Oliver Wakeman adapted The Hound of the Baskervilles as a progressive rock album in 2002, with narration by Robert Powell.

The Hound of the Baskervilles was adapted as three episodes of the American radio series The Classic Adventures of Sherlock Holmes, with John Patrick Lowrie as Holmes and Lawrence Albert as Watson. The episodes first aired in March 2008.

In 2011, Big Finish Productions released their adaptation of the book as part of their second series of Holmes dramas. Holmes was played by Nicholas Briggs, and Watson was played by Richard Earl.

In 2014, L.A. Theatre Works released their production, starring Seamus Dever as Holmes, Geoffrey Arend as Watson, James Marsters as Sir Henry, Sarah Drew as Beryl Stapleton, Wilson Bethel as Stapleton, Henri Lubatti as Dr. Mortimer, Christopher Neame as Sir Charles and Frankland, Moira Quirk as Mrs. Hudson & Mrs. Barrymore, and Darren Richardson as Barrymore.

In 2017, Bleak December released an abridged full-cast production for Cadabra Records with Sir Derek Jacobi as Holmes.

In 2020, Lions Den Theatre released a new adaptation of the novel written and directed by Keith Morrison on the company's YouTube channel. An early version of the play was performed in various locations around Nova Scotia in 2018.

In 2021, Audible released a dramatisation by George Mann and Cavan Scott, starring Colin Salmon as Holmes and Stephen Fry as Watson.

In 2022, The Hound of the Baskervilles was adapted and conducted as a "concert drama" by Neil Brand, with the music directed by Timothy Brock, and performed by the BBC Symphony Orchestra. Mark Gatiss and Sanjeev Bhaskar played Holmes and Watson, respectively. The production was recorded at the Barbican Hall on 20 December, and was broadcast on BBC Radio 3 on 22 January 2023. A filmed recording of the reading was broadcast for BBC Four on 25 December 2023.

In 2025, the podcast Sherlock & Co. adapted the story in a ten-episode adventure called "The Hound of the Baskervilles", starring Harry Attwell as Sherlock Holmes, Paul Waggott as Dr. John Watson and Marta da Silva as Mariana "Mrs. Hudson" Ametxazurra. Omari Douglas voices Dr. J Mortimer.

=== Stage ===
Prolific playwright Tim Kelly adapted the story for the stage in 1976. One production was at Boston's Theater Loft in 1982.

In 2007, Peepolykus Theatre Company premiered a new adaptation of The Hound of the Baskervilles at West Yorkshire Playhouse in Leeds. Adapted by John Nicholson and Steven Canny, the production involves only three actors and was praised by critics for its physical comedy. Following a UK tour, it transferred to the Duchess Theatre in London's West End. The Daily Telegraph described it as a ‘wonderfully delightful spoof’, while The Sunday Times praised its ‘mad hilarity that will make you feel quite sane’. This adaptation continues to be presented by both amateur and professional companies around the world.

Stage performances have also been performed in the UK in dramatisations by Joan Knight, Claire Malcolmson, Harry Meacher, and Roger Sansom, among others. Meacher's version has been produced three times, each time with himself the actor playing Holmes.

Ken Ludwig authored an adaptation entitled Baskerville: A Sherlock Holmes Mystery which premiered as a co-production at Arena Stage (Washington, D.C.) in January 2015 and McCarter Theatre Center in March 2015.

In 2021, an adaption for the stage by Steven Canny and John Nicholson for Peepolykus, directed by Tim Jackson & Lotte Wakeman toured the UK produced by Original Theatre Company and Bolton's Octagon Theatre. It was a continuation the adaptation that was directed by Lotte Wakeman for English Theatre, Frankfurt, Jermyn St Theatre and Octagon, Bolton.

In 2022, to commemorate the book's 120th anniversary, a new staging was produced in the form of a live radio play reading, adapted by Martin Parsons, and starring Colin Baker and Terry Molloy as Holmes and Watson. The tour has continued on and off into 2025.

=== Video games ===
The Hound of the Baskervilles is utilised in the final case in The Great Ace Attorney: Adventures in which the protagonist teams up with Herlock Sholmes (Sherlock Holmes in the original Japanese version) to investigate mysteries based on various entries in the Holmes chronology. In particular, the manuscript of The Hound of the Baskervilles is a key part of the case.

Sherlock Holmes and the Hound of the Baskervilles is a casual game by Frogwares. It departs from the original plot by introducing clear supernatural elements. Despite its non-canonical plot, it received good reviews.

== See also ==
- Baskerville effect
- Edinburgh Phrenological Society
- Le Monde's 100 Books of the Century
- Princetown § Geography
