= Richard Cabell =

English folkloric figure (died 1677)

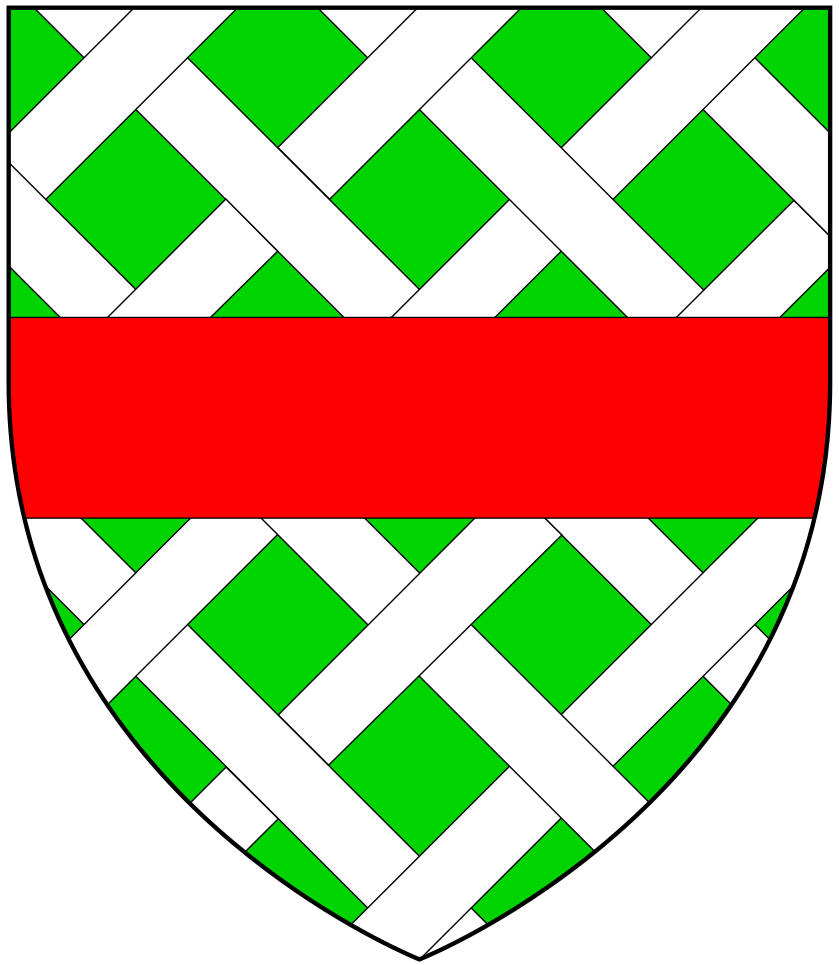
Arms of Cabell: Vert fretty argent, over all a fess gules

Richard Cabell (died 5 July 1677), of Brook Hall, was an English country squire that became a folcloric figure. Living near the parish of Buckfastleigh, Dartmoor, he is believed to be the inspiration for the wicked Hugo Baskerville in the eponymous story by Arthur Conan Doyle. When asked in 1907 about his inspiration for this story, Conan Doyle wrote in reply: "My story was really based on nothing save a remark of my friend Fletcher Robinson's that there was a legend about a dog on the moor connected with some old family". Cabell's tomb survives in the village of Buckfastleigh.

== Biography ==
He was the son and heir of Richard Cabell of Buckfastleigh by his wife Mary Prestwood, a daughter of George Prestwood of Whetcombe.

Squire Richard Cabell (known to posterity as "Dirty Dick") lived for hunting and was described as a "monstrously evil man". He gained this reputation for, amongst other things, rumoured immorality and having "sold his soul to the Devil". There was also a rumour that he had murdered his wife, Elizabeth Fowell, a daughter of Sir Edmund Fowell, 1st Baronet (1593–1674), of Fowelscombe in the parish of Ugborough, Devon. Elizabeth is mentioned in his will dated 1671, so was alive at that date. On 5 July 1677, he died and was laid to rest in a sepulchre in Holy Trinity churchyard. According to legend, the night of his interment saw a phantom pack of hounds come baying across the moor to howl at his tomb. From that night on, he could be found leading the phantom pack across the moor, usually on the anniversary of his death. In an attempt to lay his soul to rest; the villagers built a large building around the tomb, and a huge slab was placed over the top.

== Mausoleum ==
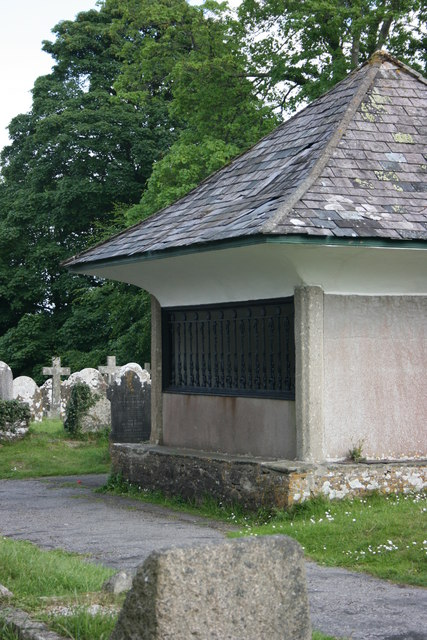
Cabell Mausoleum, graveyard of Holy Trinity Church, Buckfastleigh

In Methuen's Little Guide on Devonshire (1907), Sabine Baring-Gould wrote:

"Before the S. porch [of Holy Trinity Church, Buckfastleigh] is the enclosed tomb of Richard Cabell of Brooke, who died in 1677. He was the last male of his race, and died with such an evil reputation that he was placed under a heavy stone, and a sort of penthouse was built over that with iron gratings to it to prevent his coming up and haunting the neighbourhood. When he died the story goes that fiends and black dogs breathing fire raced over Dartmoor and surrounded Brooke, howling."

The Cabell family's mausoleum (known locally as "The Sepulchre") contains the tombs of various members of the Cabell family. It is a grade II* listed building with pyramidal slate roof and three windowless walls, with the fourth closed by an iron railing providing a view of the chest tomb within. According to Sir Howard Colvin it is one of the first two free-standing mausoleums in England, the other being the Ailesbury Mausoleum in Bedfordshire. The names inscribed on the tomb inside are Richard Cabell (died 1612), his wife Susanna (died 1597) and their son Richard (died 1677). Richard, the subject of this article, is also reputed to be buried within. Several legends exist concerning the ghost of Richard Cabell connected with the structure.
