= The King of the Foxes =

- Short story by Arthur Conan Doyle
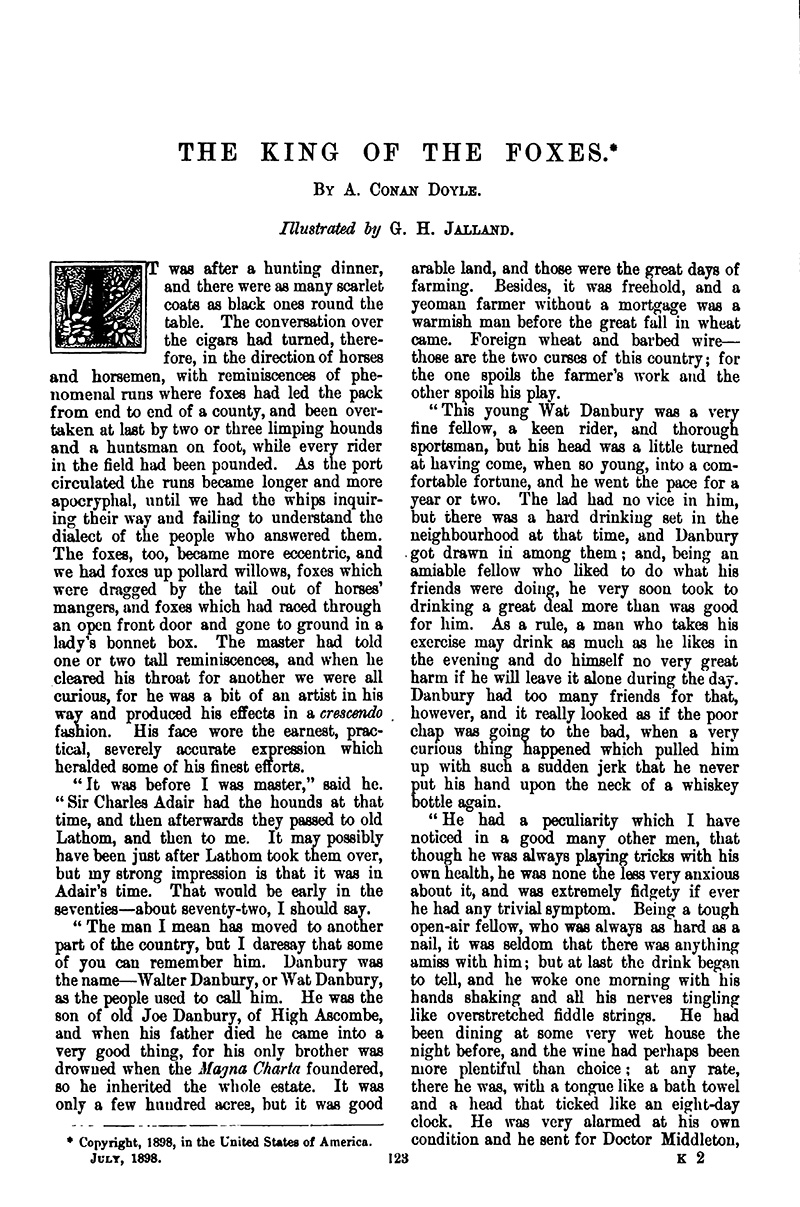

Text available at Wikisource
- Country: United Kingdom
- Language: English

Publication
- Published in: The Windsor Magazine
- Publication type: Magazine, print
- Publisher: Ward, Lock & Co.
- Publication date: July 1898

"The King of the Foxes" is a short story by Arthur Conan Doyle, first published in the United Kingdom in July 1898 in The Windsor Magazine, and in the United States in August 1898 in Ainslee's Magazine. While it is not a Sherlock Holmes story, it is recognized by scholars as a forebear of The Hound of the Baskervilles, both for its gothic themes in general and its treatment of a supernaturally terrifying animal in particular.

== Background ==
Arthur Conan Doyle was, for a time, an enthusiastic fox hunter. He developed an interest in the activity in the late 1890s, perhaps due to a friendship that began developing at about the same time with Jean Leckie, who enjoyed fox-hunting (and who would later marry Conan Doyle). Conan Doyle came to greatly enjoy riding to the hounds, and later recalled the experience fondly. His diary (now in the collection of the British Library), includes an entry recording January 13–16, 1898 as the dates on which he wrote "The King of the Foxes".

== Synopsis ==
In the framing device, a group of fox hunters are conversing after dinner, eventually telling fantastical stories about prior hunts. The unnamed narrator recalls a story told by another person — a master of foxhounds — about a hunting adventure that was so strange and frightening that it scared an alcoholic young hunter into sobriety.

In 1872, Walter "Wat" Danbury has begun drinking heavily after inheriting his father's prosperous estate at High Ascombe. Finding himself in poor health, he consults with his father's friend Dr. Middleton, who warns him that he risks developing delirium tremens or mania. Seeking to scare Danbury, Middleton suggests that he might experience an "optical delusion" during the day, saying "they usually take the shape of insects, or reptiles, or curious animals".

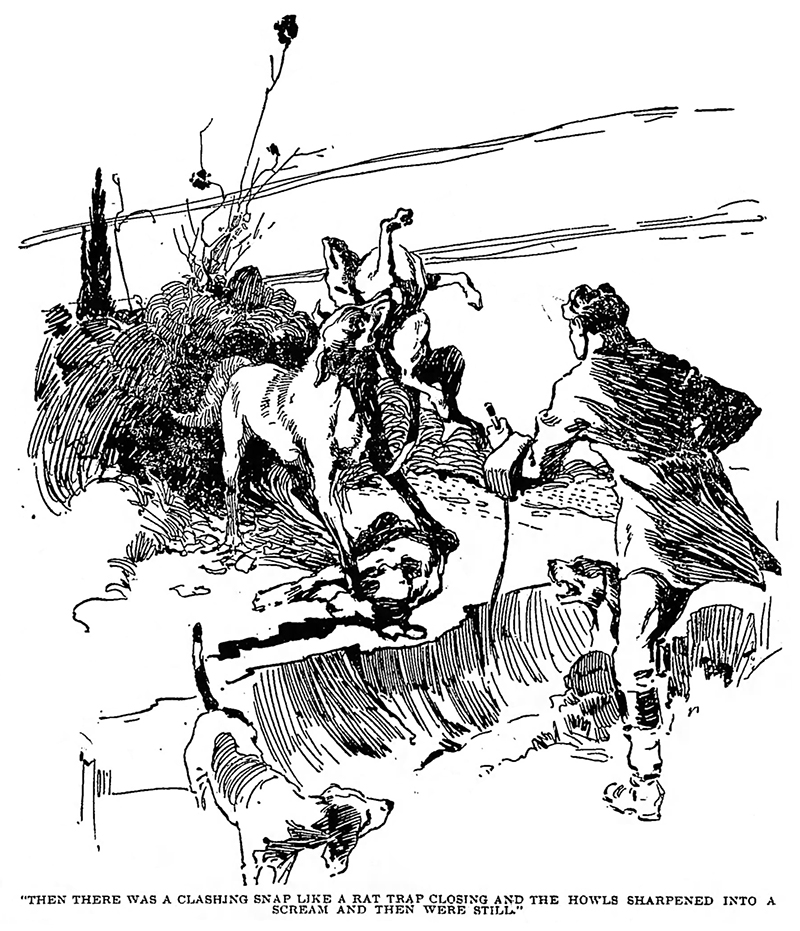
"Then there was a clashing snap, like a rat-trap closing, and the howls sharpened into a scream and then were still." An anonymous illustration from the 21 June 1903 edition of the Courier Journal.

Danbury, worried he will experience delusions, join the Ascombe Hunt meeting, riding his mare "Matilda". The hunters follow the foxhounds for two hours, with the leading hunters gradually falling away until Danbury and Joe Clarke are in the forefront; after Clarke's horse lames itself jumping over a stile, Danbury is left alone. Following the foxhounds into the dimly lit Winton Fir Wood, Danbury reflects on the length and straightness of the hunt, and that he has never once seen the fox. He nervously recalls "some silly talk which had been going round the country about the king of the foxes--a sort of demon fox, so fast that it could outrun any pack, and so fierce that they could do nothing with it if they overtook it".

Hearing the foxhounds barking, Danbury leaves Matilda behind and follows them into the thickest part of the wood, his duty being to "get in among the hounds, lash them off, and keep the brush and pads from being destroyed". He sees the foxhounds standing in a circle around a bramble patch, with one of them lying dead with its throat torn out. Emboldened by Danbury's presence, one of the foxhounds jumps into the bush. Danbury sees "a creature the size of a donkey" with "monstrous glistening fangs" and "savage red eyes" kill the foxhound. Fearing he is experiencing a delusion, Danbury abandons the hunt and flees home.

Dr. Middleton attends Danbury, who states that he has over-exerted himself and prescribes a "soothing mixture" and leeches. That night, Danbury vows that he will be "a sober, hard-working yeoman" henceforth. The next morning, Middleton rushes into his bedroom, showing him a newspaper article title "Disaster to the Ascombe Hounds". The article states that four foxhounds were found "shockingly torn and mangled" in Winton Fir Wood. A late addition to the article reveals that Mr. Brown of Smither's Farm east of Hastings had shot a creature worrying one of his sheep. The creature was found to be a Siberian grey wolf, Lupus Giganticus, that had escaped from a travelling menagerie.

The narrator closes by saying that Danbury's fright cured him of the desire to drink.

== Related works ==
Conan Doyle's interest in fox-hunting manifested itself in numerous poems, short stories, and other writings spanning most of his writing life. Indeed, his last writing on the subject came from beyond the grave, in an essay about war published posthumously on July 27, 1930.

== Print editions ==
- "The King of the Foxes", in The Windsor Magazine (July 1898).
- "The King of the Foxes", in Ainslee's Magazine (August 1898).
- "The King of the Foxes", in The Green Flag and Other Stories of War and Sport (Smith, Elder & Co., 1900).
- "The King of the Foxes", in Tales of the Ring and Camp (John Murray, 1922).
- Anastasia Klimchynskaya, The King of the Foxes: Transcription and Annotation, in Regulation and Imagination: Legal and Literary Perspectives on Fox-hunting (edited by Ross E. Davies) (Green Bag Press 2021).
