= Sir Edmund Fowell, 1st Baronet =

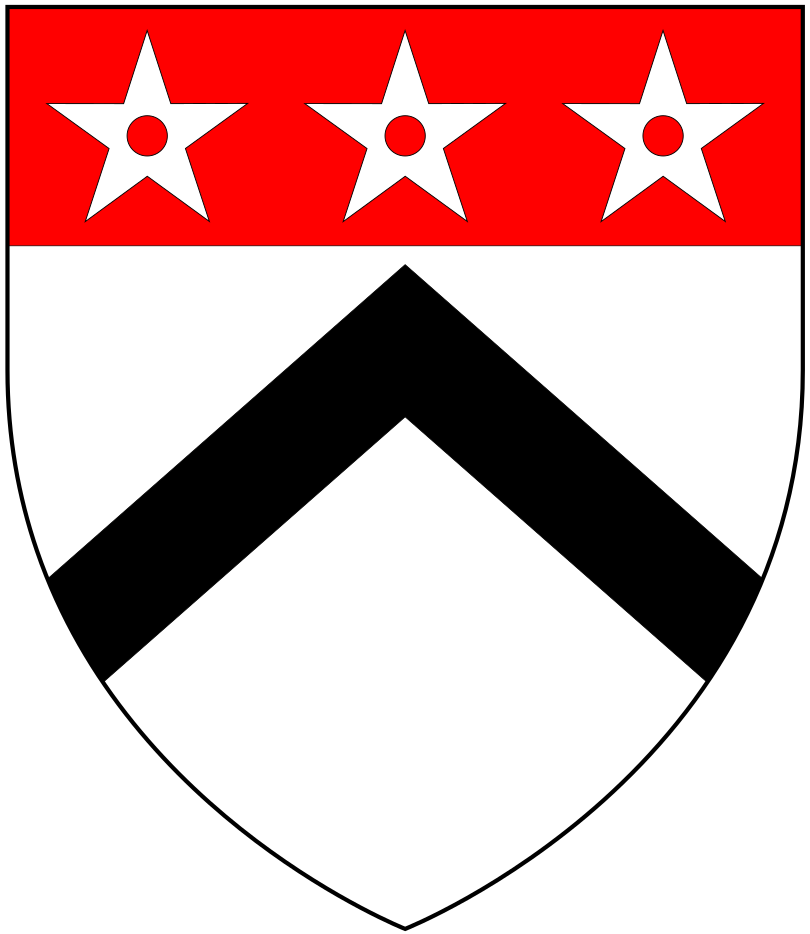
Arms of Fowell: Argent, a chevron sable on a chief gules three mullets pierced of the first

Sir Edmund Fowell, 1st Baronet (1593 – October 1674) of Fowelscombe in the parish of Ugborough in Devon, was a Member of Parliament for Ashburton in Devon from 1640 to 1648.

== Origins ==
He was the 3rd son and eventual heir of Arthur Fowell (born 1552) of Fowelscombe, by his wife Maria Reynell, a daughter of Richard Reynell (d.1585) of East Ogwell in Devon, Sheriff of Devon in 1585.

== Career ==
He inherited the paternal estates on the death of his elder brother Arthur Fowell (1582-1612), who drowned in an accident at Ford. He was knighted at Greenwich Palace on 3 November 1619. In November 1640 he was elected Member of Parliament for Ashburton in the Long Parliament. He did not sit in the Rump Parliament after 1648. He was a member of the parliamentary committee and was a Deputy Lieutenant of Devon. During the Civil War was president of the Committee for Sequestration. He was created a baronet on 30 April 1661.

== Marriage and children ==
He married Margaret Poulett, a daughter of Sir Anthony Poulett (1562–1600) (alias Pawlett, etc.), of Hinton St George in Somerset, Governor of Jersey and Captain of the Guard to Queen Elizabeth I and a sister of John Poulett, 1st Baron Poulett (1585–1649). By his wife he had four sons and six daughters including:

- Sir John Fowell, 2nd Baronet (1623–1677), of Fowelscombe, eldest son and heir.
- Anthony Fowell (1636-1636), second son, died in infancy.
- Edmond Fowell (1637-1632) of Penquit, 3 miles east of Fowelscombe, 3rd son, who married Bridget Browne, a daughter of Thomas Browne of East Allington, but died leaving no sons.
- Thomas Fowell (1638-1639), 4th son, died in infancy.
- Elizabeth Fowell (1622-post 1671), wife of Richard Cabell (d.1677) of Brook Hall, in the parish of Buckfastleigh, Devon, known to posterity as "Dirty Dick", and believed to be the inspiration for the wicked Hugo Baskerville, "the first of his family to be hounded to death when he hunted an innocent maiden over the moor by night", one of the central characters in Conan Doyle's novel The Hound of the Baskervilles (1901-2), the tale of a hellish hound and a cursed country squire. Cabell's tomb survives in the village of Buckfastleigh. Conan Doyle's Baskerville Hall is believed to be inspired by one of three Devon mansions: Fowelscombe, Brook Hall and Hayford Hall, also in the parish of Buckfastleigh.

== Death ==
Fowell died in 1674 at the age of 81 and was buried in Ugborough Church.

Parliament of England
Preceded by Constituency in abeyance	Member of Parliament for Ashburton; 1640–1648; With: Sir John Northcote, 1st Baronet	Succeeded by Not represented in Rump Parliament
Baronetage of England
New creation	Baronet (of Fowellscombe); 1661–1674	Succeeded by John Fowell
