= Walter Reynell (MP, Devon) =

15th-century English politician

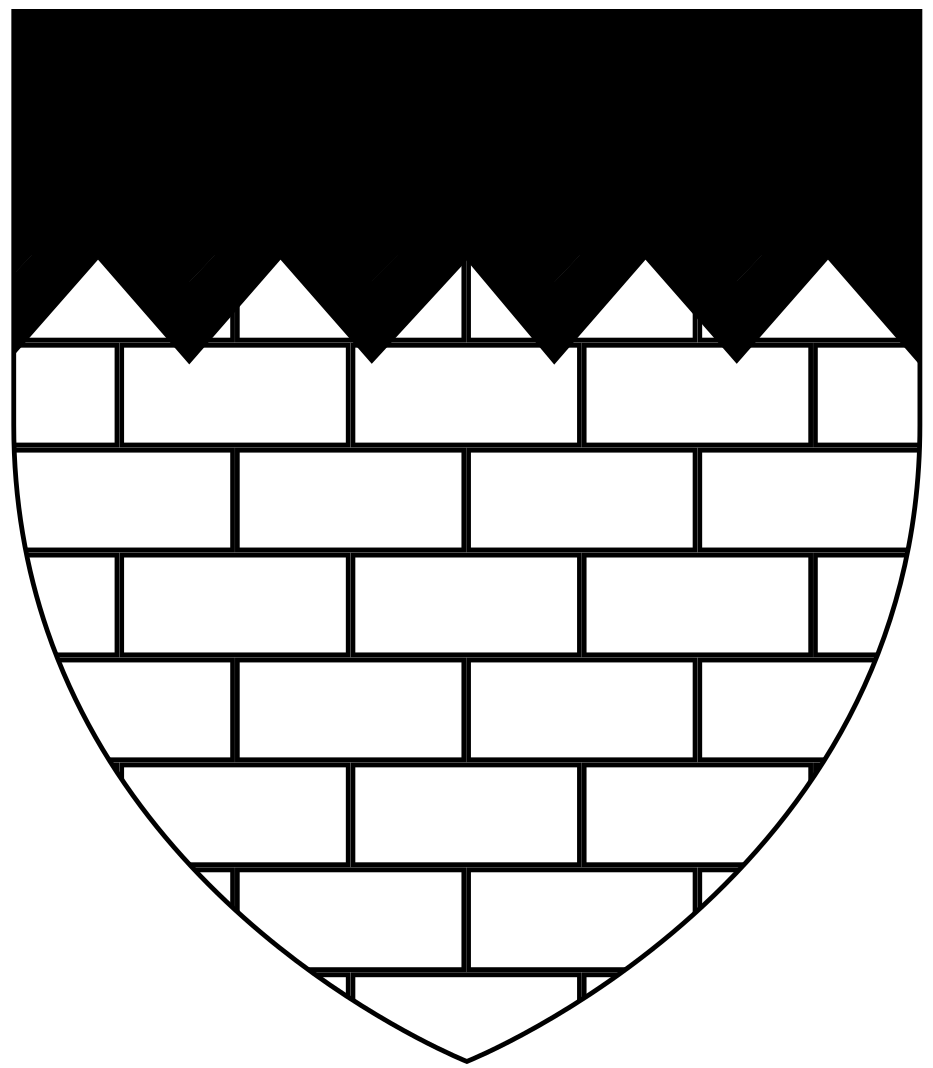
Arms of Reynell: Argent, masonry sable a chief indented of the second

Walter Reynell (born before 1360 and died after 1424) was an English landowner, soldier, administrator and politician who sat as Member of Parliament for Devon in 1404.

== Origins ==
Born before 1360, he was the son of John Reynell (died before 1365), reported to have been MP for Cambridgeshire in 1351, and his wife Maud Fulbourn, daughter of Giles Fulbourn. His paternal grandparents were Walter Reynell and his wife Maud Trumpington. The Reynell family had held estates in Devon from the time of King Henry II and his ancestor Sir Richard Reynell had served as Sheriff of the county under King Richard I.

== Career ==
First recorded in 1375 as serving at sea under Sir Philip Courtenay, Admiral of the West, by 1376 he was married. His first wife brought him an estate at Lamside in the Devon parish of Holbeton, in addition to his inheritance in Devon from his father, which included an estate at Butterleigh, and holdings from his mother in Cambridgeshire.

His first public appointment, from 1382 to 1386, was as Controller of the Coinage and Master of Assay for the Duchy of Cornwall. Before 1383 his second marriage brought him the Devon manors of Malston in the parish of Sherford and East Ogwell. His title to the latter was disputed by a relation, who also claimed custody of his wife's half-brother Robert and alleged that Reynell had forced her sister Clarissa into a nunnery in order to inherit the property. The case collapsed after the Bishop of Bath and Wells found that Clarissa had entered Buckland Priory of her own free will and was perfectly happy to stay there.

From 1384 to 1386 he acted as attorney in Ireland for St Nicholas' Priory, Exeter, though it is not known how far he entrusted the work to subordinates, and in 1388 he accepted a feoffeeship in Somerset, these two appointments suggesting he had acquired some legal expertise.

Also in 1388, he was involved in a legal dispute over his inherited property at Butterleigh with Edward Courtenay, Earl of Devon. Courtenay claimed feudal rights over the estate and had blocked Reynell's oxen from working the land. After attempting to influence the jury, Reynell was imprisoned by the sheriff and fined 13 shillings (equivalent to over 600 pounds in 2022), but in the end won his case.

From 1393 onwards he sat on various royal commissions for the county of Devon, being also recorded as a juror, and by 1400 had made his third marriage, to a Cambridgeshire heiress who brought him a share of three manors in that county: Badlingham in the parish of Chippenham, Fordham, and Wicken. In 1401 he served a year as Crown Escheator for Devon and Cornwall and in October 1404 was elected MP for Devon.

After 1410 he seems to have withdrawn from public life in order to concentrate on his Devon estates, centred on Malston where he undertook extensive building works and acquired episcopal licences to have an oratory there. When the manor of Bedlingham, of which he held half, was seized by force in 1413 and his employees fled in terror, he went to law and in 1415 bought the other half, putting the whole in the name of his son who was with the army in Normandy. In 1423 he sold it and his other Cambridgeshire properties for the sum of 1,000 pounds (say 700,000 pounds in 2022).

His date of death is unknown.

== Family ==
Married before 1376, his first wife was named Agnes (died before 1383) and no children are known.

By 1383 he was married to Margaret Stighull (died before 1399), daughter of William Stighull and his wife Elizabeth Malston, and they had one son:

Walter Reynell, who married Joan Walrond.

By 1400 he was married to Joan Bassingbourn, daughter of John Bassingbourn, and their children included:

John Reynell, who married Agnes Chichester.
Robert Reynell, died childless.
Eleanor Reynell (died 1507), who married William Fowell.
Alice Reynell, who married a member of the Trevelyan family.
