= William Fowell =

15th-century English politician

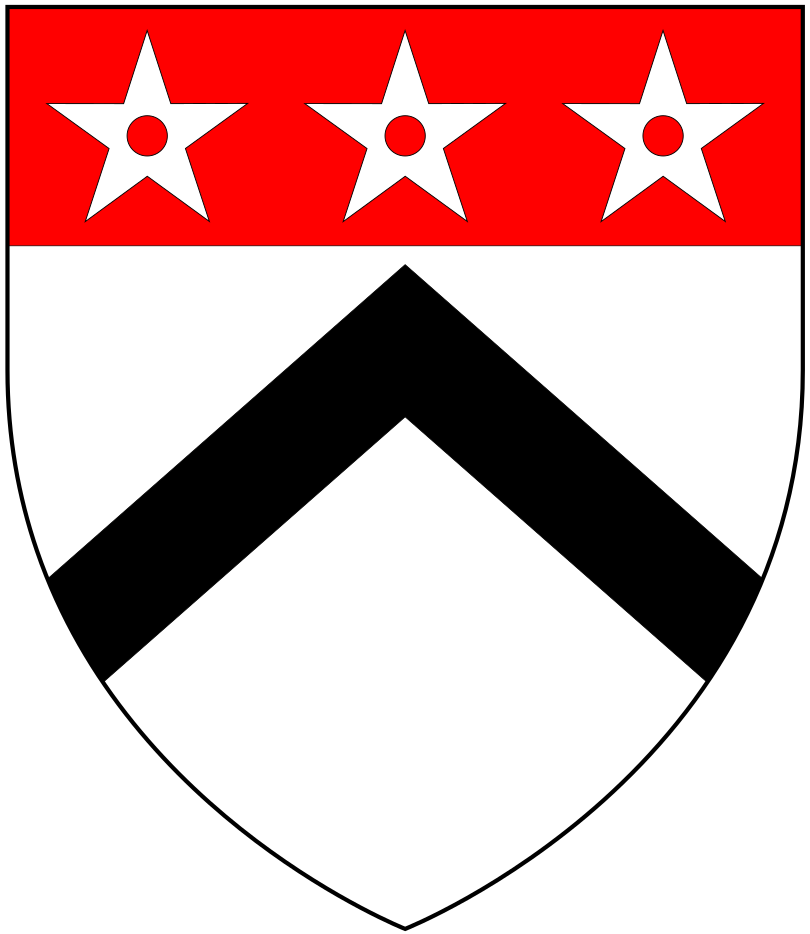
Arms of Fowell of Fowelscombe

William Fowell (died 23 March 1507) of Fowelscombe in the parish of Ugborough in Devon, was a Member of Parliament for Totnes in Devon in 1455.

He was the son and heir of Richard Fowell of Fowelscombe by his wife Mary Walrond, a daughter of William Walrond. He married Elinor Reynell (died 9 April 1507), a daughter of Walter Reynell (fl. 1404) of Malston in the parish of Sherford in Devon, a member of parliament for Devon in 1404. Fowell died on 23 March 1507 and his wife died 16 days later on 9 April 1507. The couple's monument survives in Ugborough Church.
