= Fowell baronets =

Title in the Baronetage of England

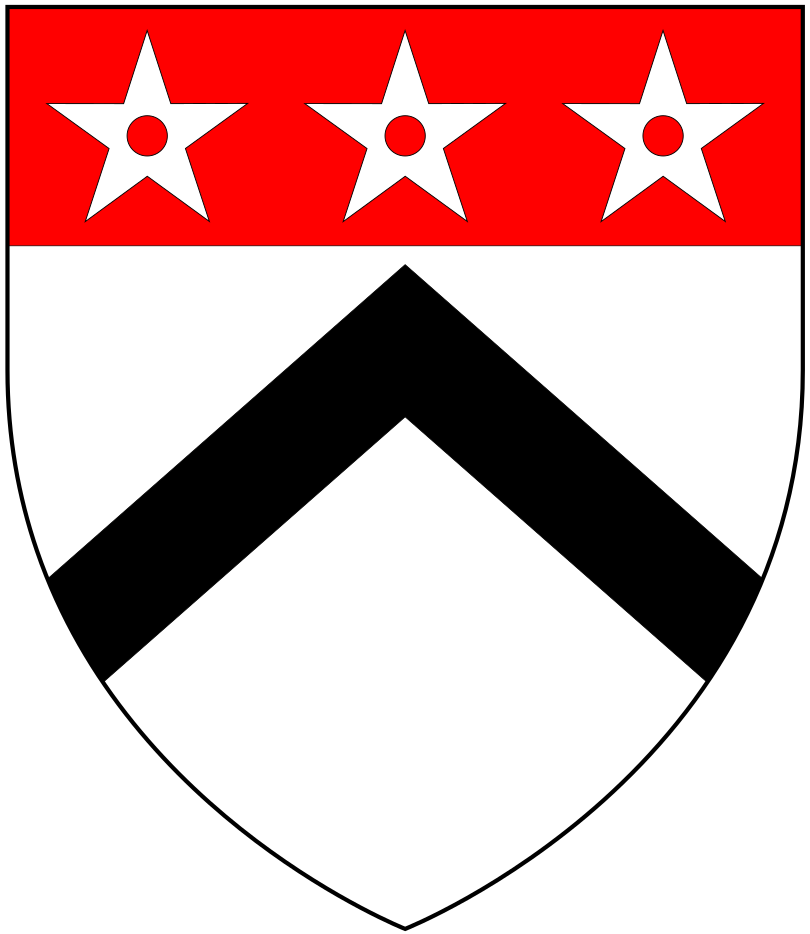
Arms of Fowell: Argent, a chevron sable on a chief gules three mullets pierced of the first

The Fowell Baronetcy, of Fowellscombe in the County of Devon, was a title in the Baronetage of England. It was created on 30 April 1661 for Edmund Fowell of Fowelscombe in the parish of Ugborough, Devon, previously Member of Parliament for Ashburton. The second Baronet also represented Ashburton in Parliament. The third Baronet was Member of Parliament for Totnes. The title became extinct on his death in 1692.

== Fowell baronets, of Fowellscombe (1661) ==
- Sir Edmund Fowell, 1st Baronet (1593–1674)
- Sir John Fowell, 2nd Baronet (1623–1677)
- Sir John Fowell, 3rd Baronet (1665–1692)
