= Walter Reynell (died 1475) =

Member of the Parliament of England

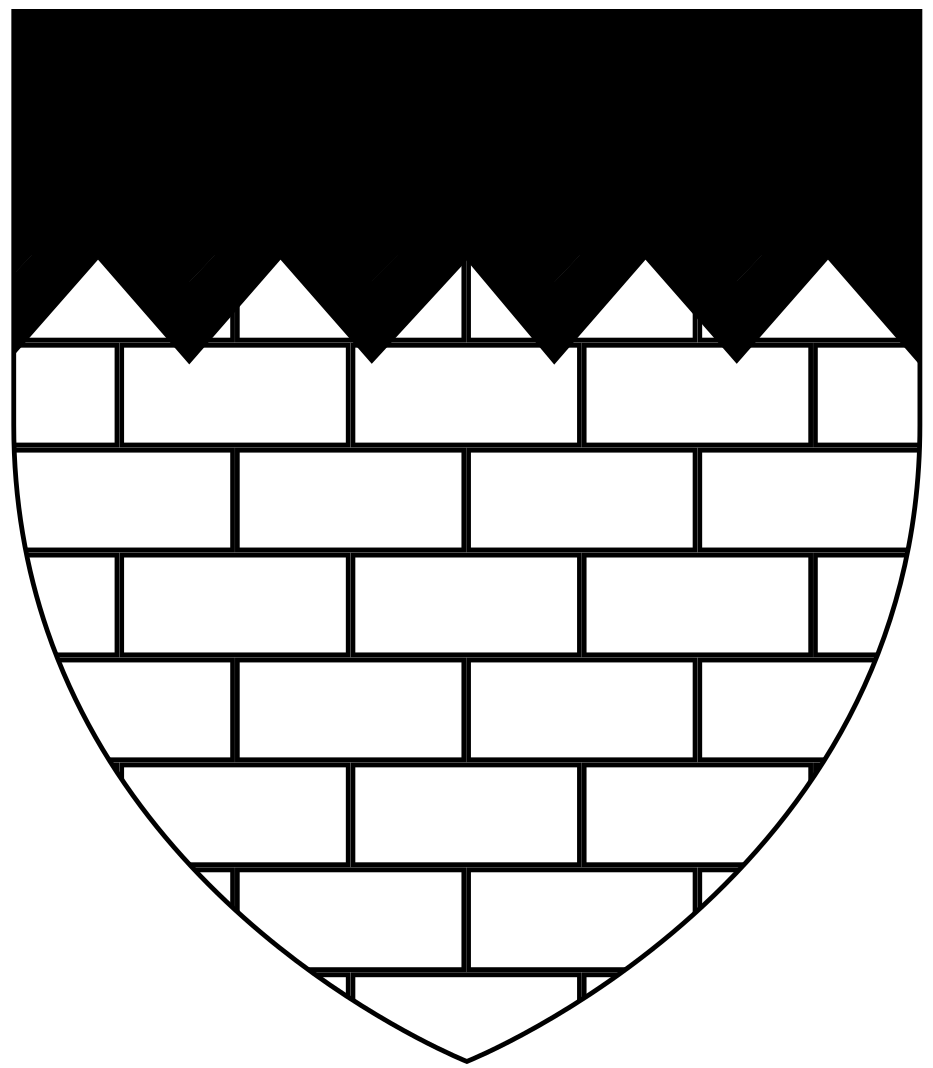
Arms of Reynell: Argent, masonry sable a chief indented of the second as shown in The Visitations of the County of Devon.

Walter Reynell (died 1475), of Malston in the parish of Sherford, was an English landowner, administrator and politician from Devon who sat as MP for Totnes in 1447 and as MP for Devon in 1453.

== Origins ==
Born about 1395, he was the son of Walter Reynell (died after 1424), a landowner who sat as MP for Devon in 1404, and his second wife Margaret Stighull (died before 1399), daughter of William Stighull and his wife Elizabeth Malston. His paternal grandparents were John Reynell (died before 1365), reported to have been MP for Cambridgeshire in 1351, and his wife Maud Fulbourn, daughter of Giles Fulbourn. The MP John Reynell was his younger half-brother.

== Career ==
In 1415, at a young age, he was serving in the army of King Henry V in Normandy.

Back in England, after the death of his father he was sworn as a justice of the peace for Devon in 1434 and in 1435 was involved in an acrimonious lawsuit over inherited land in Cambridgeshire. From 1442 onwards his name appears on royal commissions for Devon and as a witness to a court case in the port of Dartmouth. After he had sat as MP for Totnes in 1447, a royal commission was appointed in July 1450 to enquire into the names of the malefactors who, together with Robert Wennington of Dartmouth, an MP and privateer, had assaulted and illegally imprisoned Walter Reynell “so that his life was despaired of” until he provided Wennington a written release from all law suits. In 1453 he was again returned to Parliament as MP for Devon and in 1455 was on the electoral roll in both Devon and Exeter.

He died on 25 February 1475. As his eldest son had died before him, his heir was his eldest grandson John Reynell, aged 15, who died childless.

== Family ==
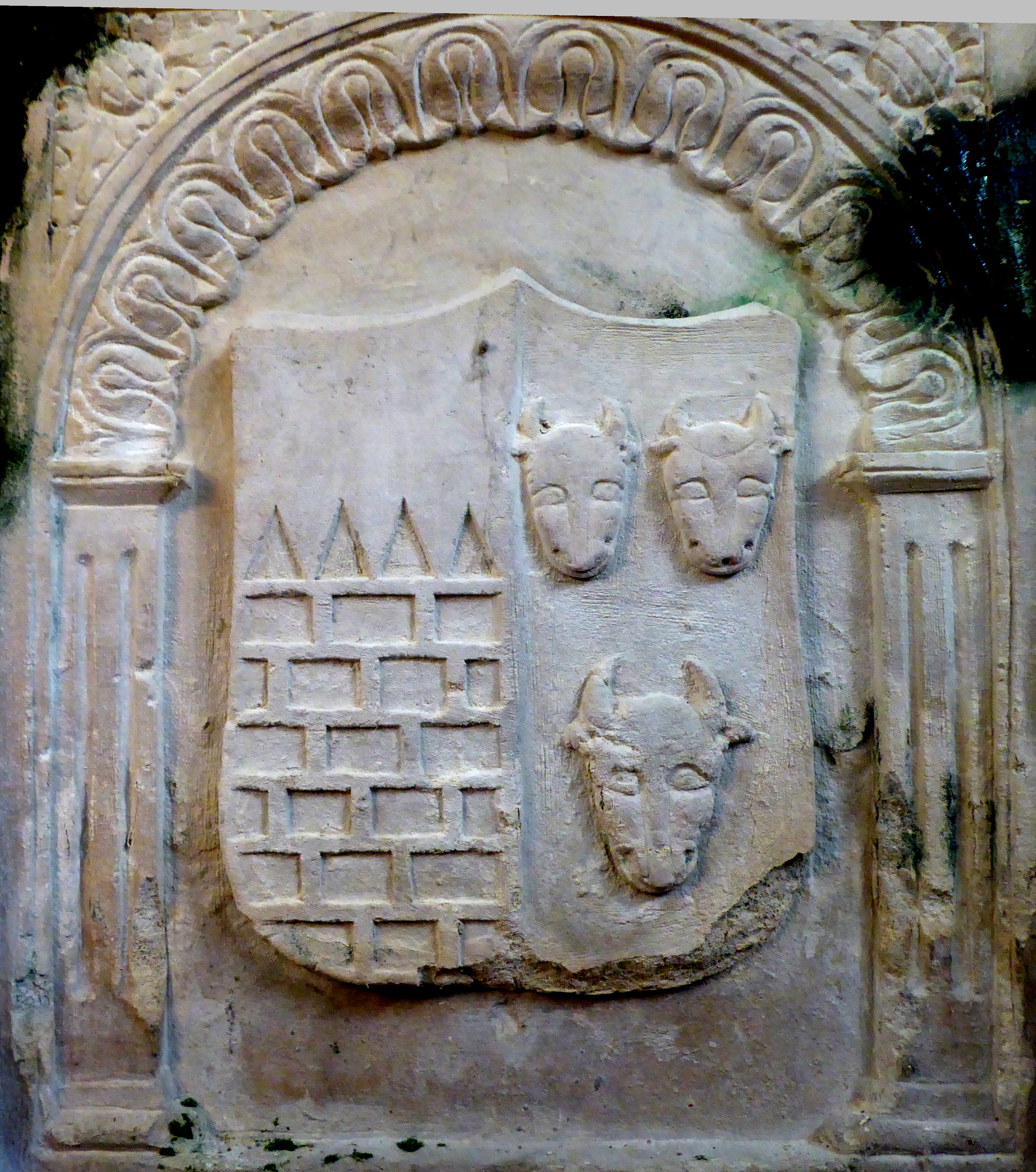
Arms of Reynell impaling Walrond (Argent, three bull's heads cabossed sable armed or), symbolising the marriage of Walter Reynell and Joan Walrond. Detail from monument in East Ogwell Church to their great-grandson Richard Reynell(1519-1585).

About 1425 he married Joan Walrond, daughter of William Walrond, of Bradfield in the parish of Uffculme, and his wife Juliana. and their children included:

- Robert Reynell (died before 25 February 1460), who married Thomasine Hatch.
- Walter Reynell, who married first Joan Whiting, daughter of Robert Whiting, and secondly Radegund Coplestone, daughter of Philip Coplestone, of Coplestone, and his wife Anne Bonville.
- Margaret Reynell, who married Richard Champernowne, of Instow.
- Eleanor Reynell (called Joan in some sources), who married John Stretchleigh, of Stretchleigh (now written Strashleigh) in the parish of Ermington.
