= John Reynell (politician) =

Member of the Parliament of England

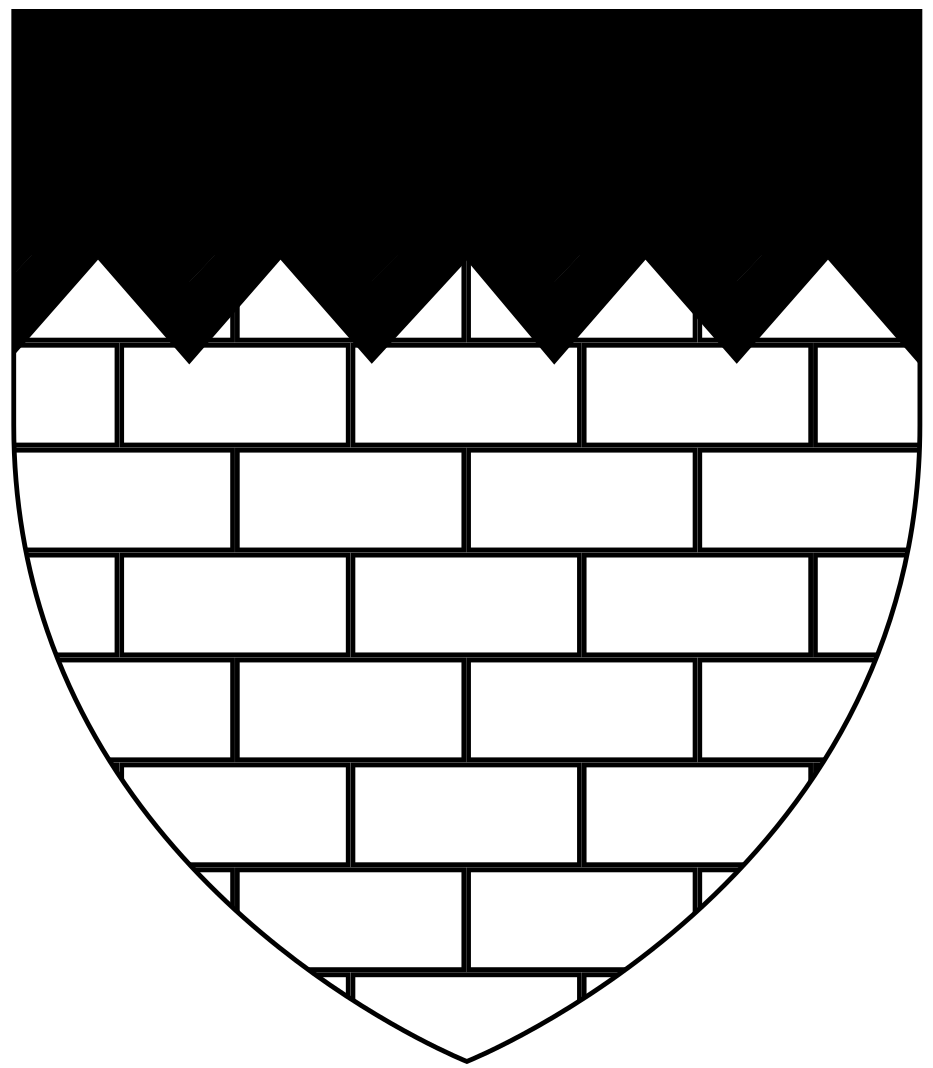
Arms of Reynell: Argent, masonry sable a chief indented of the second

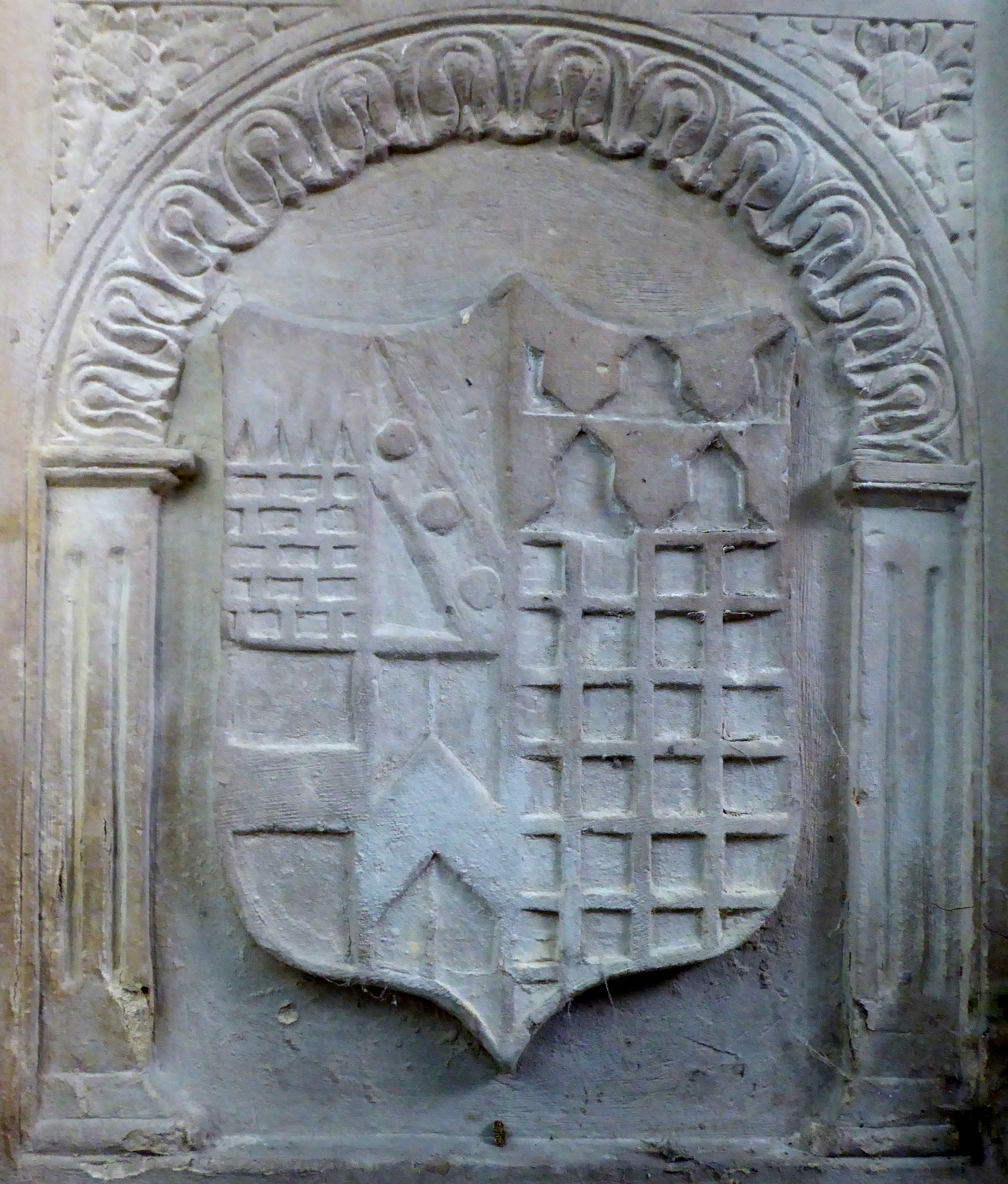
Arms of Reynell (of 4 quarters: 1:Reynell; 2: (Argent, on a bend sable three bezants) Burden, 3: (Azure, on a fess engrailed argent three lozenges gules ) Stighull of Malston and East Ogwell, 4: (Per pale argent and gules, on a chevron azure three cross-crosslets botonee or) Thorber) impaling Chichester (Chequy or and gules, a chief vair), sybolising marriage of John Reynell and Agnes Chichester. Detail from monument in East Ogwell Church to their nephew's grandson Richard Reynell (1519–1585), MP

John Reynell (floruit 1427/28) was an English landowner and Member of Parliament for Devon in 1427/28.

== Origins ==
He was a son of Walter Reynell (fl. 1404) who held lands at Malston in the parish of Sherford (Devon) and Badlingham (Cambridgeshire),who also served as a Member of Parliament for Devon in 1404, His mother was Walter's second wife Margaret Stighull, daughter and heiress of William Stighull (alias Styl, Stigill, etc) who held the estates of Malston and East Ogwell, by his wife Elizabeth Malston, daughter and heiress of Robert Malston of Malston. His elder brother was Walter Reynell (died 1478) of Malston,also a Member of Parliament for Devon in 1454/55.

== Marriage ==
He married Agnes Chichester, a daughter of the Chichester family then recently seated at Raleigh in the parish of Pilton, Devon.

== Death ==
He predeceased his father without progeny.
