= Sir John Fowell, 3rd Baronet =

English politician (1665-1692)

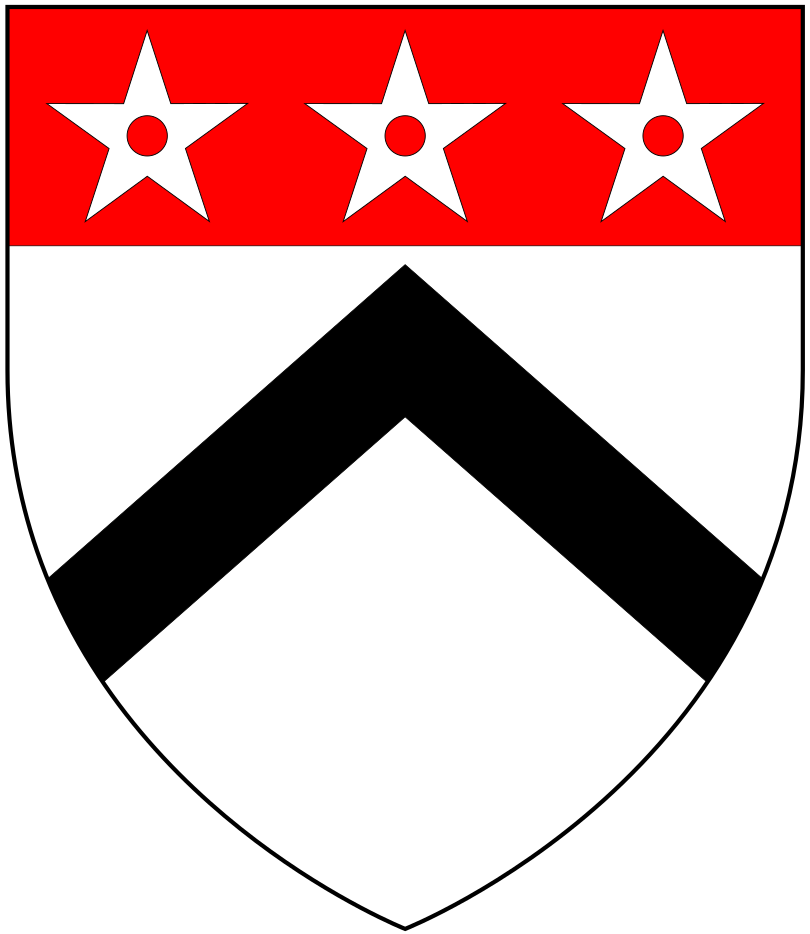
Arms of Fowell: Argent, a chevron sable on a chief gules three mullets pierced of the first

Sir John Fowell, 3rd Baronet (12 December 1665 – 26 November 1692) of Fowelscombe in the parish of Ugborough in Devon, was an English politician who sat in the House of Commons from 1689 to 1692.

== Origins ==
Fowell was the son and heir of Sir John Fowell, 2nd Baronet (1623–1677), of Fowelscombe, by his wife Elizabeth Chichester (d.1678), a daughter of Sir John Chichester (1598-1669) of Hall in the parish of Bishop's Tawton in Devon, Member of Parliament for Lostwithiel in Cornwall in 1624.

== Career ==
He inherited the baronetcy on the death of his father in 1677. In 1689 Fowell was elected Member of Parliament for Totnes in Devon, and sat until his death in 1692. He was one of the 151 MPs who voted against making the Prince of Orange king, but in favour of declaring Princess Mary queen.

== Death and succession ==
Fowell died unmarried at the age of 26 when the baronetcy became extinct. His heirs were his two surviving sisters, who until 1711 held the Fowell estates of Fowelscombe and Ludbrooke in co-parcenary:

- Elizabeth Fowell (d.post-1680), who in 1679 married (as his 1st wife) George Parker (1651-1743) of Boringdon in the parish of Colebrook, and of North Molton, both in Devon. The marriage was without progeny, but by his second wife Anne Buller, George Parker was the grandfather of John Parker, 1st Baron Boringdon (d. 1788), whose son was John Parker, 1st Earl of Morley (1772–1840) of Saltram House.
- Margaret Fowell, who in 1679 married (as his 1st wife) Arthur Champernowne of Dartington, Devon, and was the mother of Arthur Champernowne (d.1717) of Dartington, MP for Totnes.

In 1711 a division of the estates took place, with Fowelscombe going to the Champernowne family, which held it until 1758,

Parliament of England
Preceded by Sir Edward Seymour, 3rd Baronet; John Kelland	Member of Parliament for Totnes; 1689–1692; With: Rawlin Mallock 1689–1690; Henry Seymour Portman 1690–1692	Succeeded by Henry Seymour Portman; Thomas Coulson
Baronetage of England
Preceded by John Fowell	Baronet (of Fowellscombe); 1677–1692	Extinct
