= Sir John Fowell, 2nd Baronet =

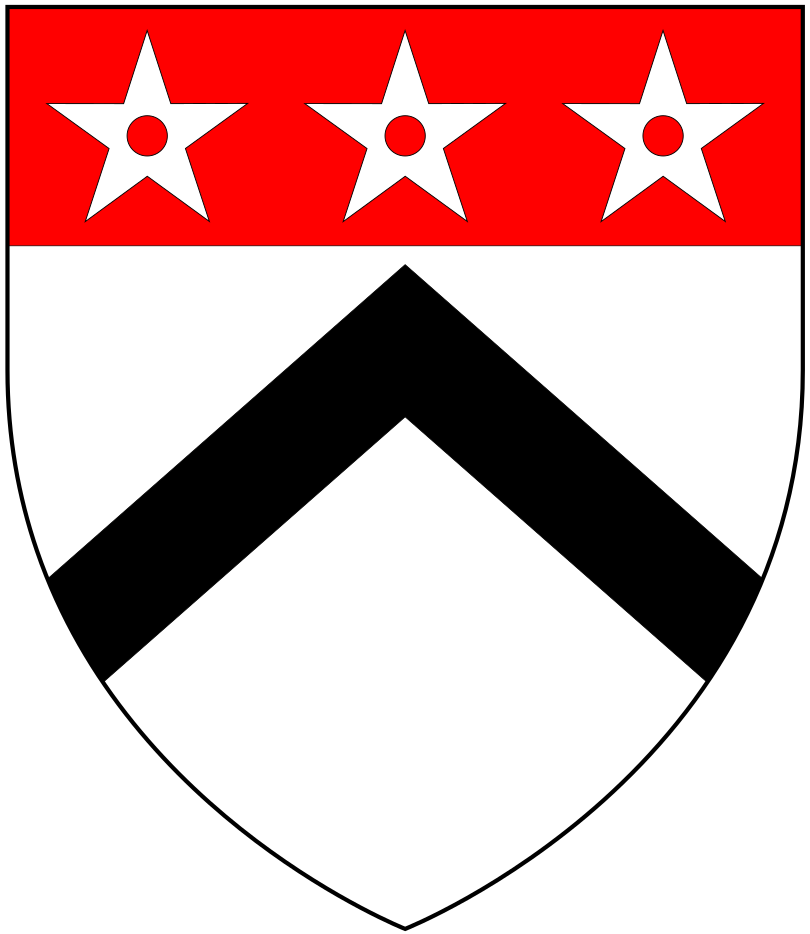
Arms of Fowell: Argent, a chevron sable on a chief gules three mullets pierced of the first

Sir John Fowell, 2nd Baronet (14 August 1623 – 8 January 1677) of Fowelscombe in the parish of Ugborough in Devon, was thrice elected a Member of Parliament for Ashburton in Devon, between 1659 and 1677. He fought in the Parliamentary army during the Civil War and following the Restoration of the Monarchy was appointed in 1666 by King Charles II Vice-Admiral of Devon.

== Origins ==
Fowell was the eldest son and heir of Sir Edmund Fowell, 1st Baronet (1593-1674), of Fowelscombe, by his wife Margaret Poulett, a daughter of Sir Anthony Poulett (1562–1600) (alias Pawlett, etc.), of Hinton St George in Somerset, Governor of Jersey and Captain of the Guard to Queen Elizabeth I and a sister of John Poulett, 1st Baron Poulett (1585–1649).

== Career ==
He was a colonel in the Regiment of Foot in the Parliamentary army during the Civil War and was governor of Totnes. In 1659 he was elected Member of Parliament for Ashburton, Devon, in the Third Protectorate Parliament. He was re-elected MP for Ashburton in 1660 for the Convention Parliament and was re-elected MP for Ashburton in 1661 for the Cavalier Parliament. He held the seat until his death in 1677 at the age of 53. In 1666 he became Vice-Admiral of Devon and in 1674 on the death of his father he inherited the baronetcy.

== Marriage and children ==
Fowell married Elizabeth Chichester (d.1678), a daughter of Sir John Chichester (1598-1669) of Hall in the parish of Bishop's Tawton in Devon, Member of Parliament for Lostwithiel in Cornwall in 1624. By his wife he had children including:

- Sir John Fowell, 3rd Baronet (1665-1692), eldest son and heir, MP for Totnes in Devon, who died without male children whereupon the baronetcy became extinct.
- Edmond Fowell (1669-1670), 2nd son, died in infancy.
- Elizabeth Fowell (d.post-1680), who in 1679 married (as his 1st wife) George Parker (1651-1743) of Boringdon in the parish of Colebrook, and of North Molton, both in Devon. The marriage was without children, but by his second wife Anne Buller, George Parker was the grandfather of John Parker, 1st Baron Boringdon (d. 1788), whose son was John Parker, 1st Earl of Morley (1772–1840) of Saltram House.
- Anne Fowell (1677-1678), died in infancy.
- Margaret Fowell, who in 1679 married (as his 1st wife) Arthur Champernowne of Dartington, Devon, and was the mother of Arthur Champernowne (d.1717) of Dartington, MP for Totnes.

Parliament of England
Preceded by Not represented in Protectorate parliaments	Member of Parliament for Ashburton; 1660; With: Thomas Reynell	Succeeded by Not represented in restored Rump
Baronetage of England
Preceded by Edmud Fowell	Baronet (of Fowellscombe); 1674–1677	Succeeded by John Fowell
