= Fowelscombe =

Historic manor in Devon, England

Coordinates: 50°22′53″N 3°50′19″W

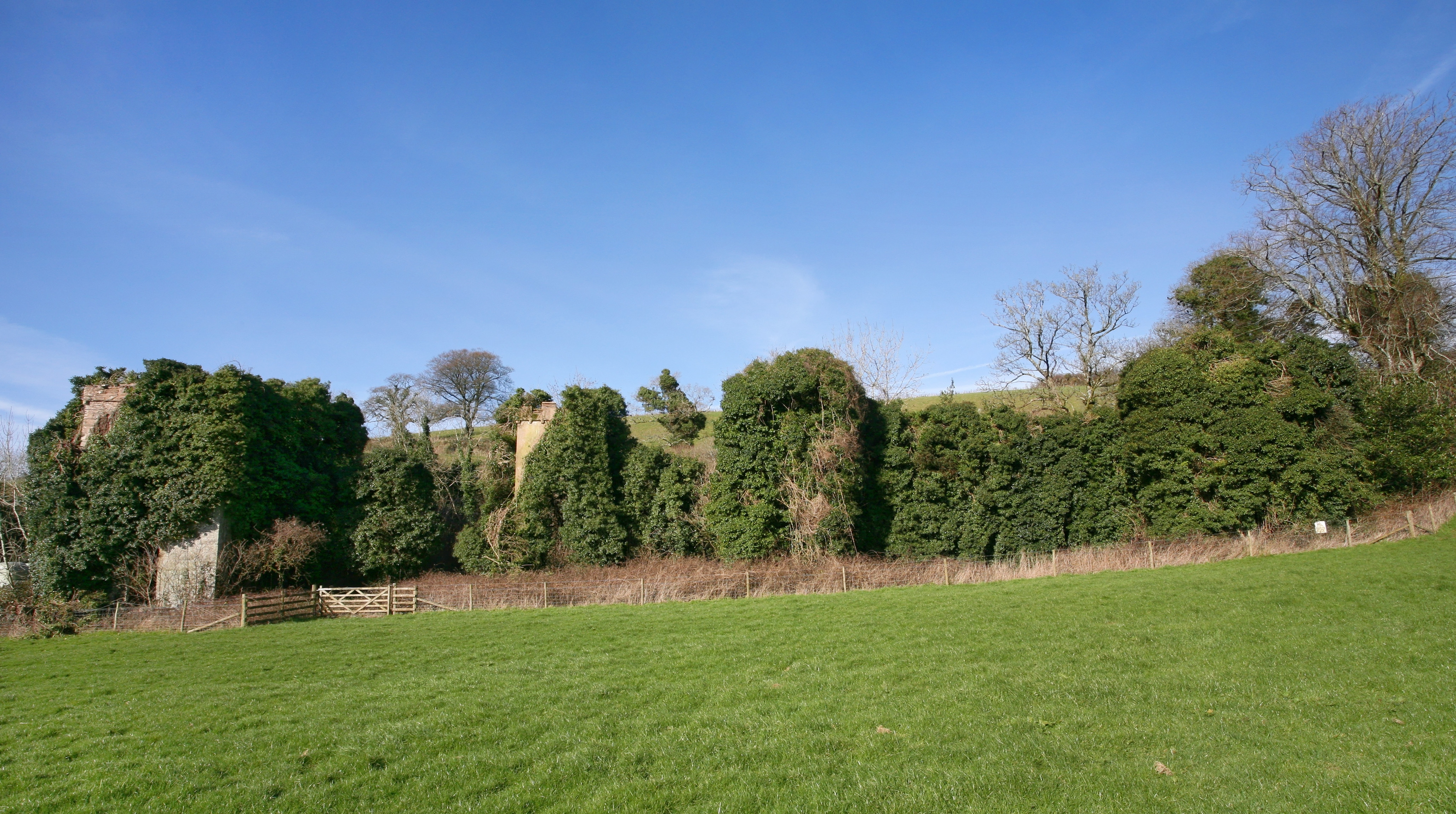
The ruins of Fowelscombe House, viewed in 2008

Fowelscombe (Note: Tristram Risdon, writing in the early 17th century reported that Vowelscombe was an alternative spelling; likewise Vowell, or in some deeds Foghill, for the family name.) is a historic manor in the parish of Ugborough in Devon, England. The large ancient manor house known as Fowelscombe House survives only as an ivy-covered "romantic ruin" overgrown by trees and nettles, situated 1 mile south-east of the village of Ugborough. The ruins are a Grade II listed building.

It is believed to be one of three possible houses on which Conan Doyle based his "Baskerville Hall" in his novel The Hound of the Baskervilles, (1901–02) the others being Hayford Hall (also owned by John King (died 1861) of Fowelscombe) and Brook Manor.

== History ==
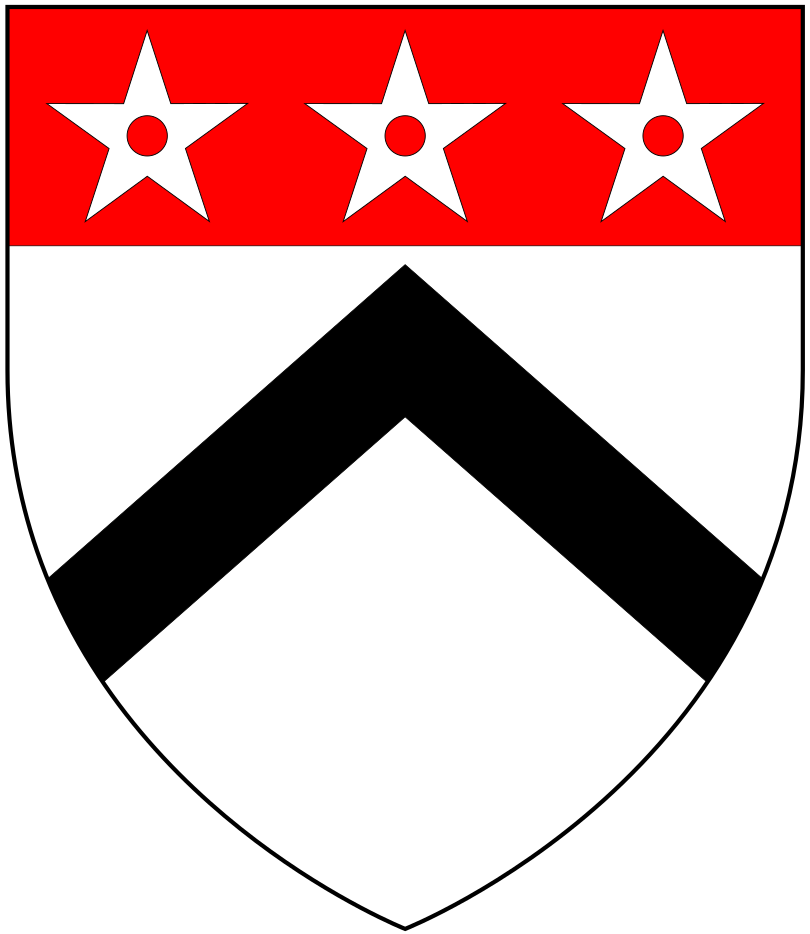
Arms of Fowell of Fowelscombe (Note: Blazoned as Argent, a chevron sable on a chief gules three mullets pierced of the first in Vivian, p.369)

In the time of William Pole (died 1635), the manor of Fowelscombe comprised the estates of Bolterscombe, Smythescombe and Black Hall, situated in the parishes of Ugborough and North Huish.

Fowell
The earliest member of the Fowell (alias Foghill, Foel, etc.) family identified by William Pole (who did not record his first name) was an attorney during the reign of King Henry IV (1399–1413). His eventual successor Sir Thomas Fowell (born 1453), a member of the King's court, is recorded as being born at Fowelscombe, implying that there was a house on this site before that date. His eventual successor William Fowell (died 1507) of Fowelscombe was a member of parliament for Totnes in Devon in 1455. His great-grandfather Thomas Fowell of Fowelscombe is the earliest member of the family recorded in the pedigree submitted by the family for the 1620 Heraldic visitation of Devon.

The grandson of William Fowell (died 1507) was Thomas Fowell (died 1544) (son of Thomas Fowell by his wife a member of the Bevil family of Cornwall) who in 1537 rebuilt the manor house at Fowelscombe. His great-grandson Richard Fowell (died 1594) of Fowelscombe had four sons, one of whom was William Fowell (1556–1636) who founded the junior branch of the family seated at Black Hall (within the manor of Fowelscombe) in the parish of North Huish.

The grandson and eventual heir of Richard Fowell (died 1594) was Sir Edmund Fowell, 1st Baronet (1593–1674), of Fowelscombe, also lord of the manor of Ludbrooke in the parish of Ugborough, created a baronet in 1661. He married Margaret Poulett, a daughter of Sir Anthony Poulett (1562–1600). His eldest son and heir was Sir John Fowell, 2nd Baronet (1623–1677) who married Elizabeth Chichester (died 1678), a daughter of Sir John Chichester (1598–1669) of Hall, Bishop's Tawton.

The second Baronet's son and heir was Sir John Fowell, 3rd Baronet (1665–1692), Member of Parliament for Totnes (1689–1692), who died unmarried aged 26, when the baronetcy became extinct. His heirs were his two surviving sisters, Elizabeth and Margaret who until 1711 held the Fowell estates of Fowelscombe and Ludbrooke jointly. In 1679 Elizabeth married George Parker (1651–1743) of Boringdon and North Molton, both in Devon. The marriage was without children. Margaret married Arthur Champernowne of Dartington in 1679, and was the mother of Arthur Champernowne (died 1717) of Dartington, MP for Totnes.

Champernowne
In 1711 a division of the estates took place, with Fowelscombe going to the Champernowne family, which held it until 1758.

Herbert
In 1758 Mr Herbert of Plymouth purchased the estate from the Champernownes. The house was enlarged in the 18th century. His son George Herbert sold it to Thomas King in 1780.

King
The estate was purchased by Thomas King who had interests in the brewing industry and owned property in Plymouth and London. According to Richard Polwhele (died 1838) King made many improvements to the house, which Meller (2015) interprets as meaning that it was he who enlarged the house beyond the original tower, hall and entrance and added the castellations. After Thomas King died childless in 1792 the estate was left to his three brothers, John (died 1795), Robert and Richard. In 1807 Robert exchanged his interest in Fowelscombe for Richard's manor of North Huish. After Richard died childless, Fowelscombe was inherited by Robert's eldest son, John in 1811.

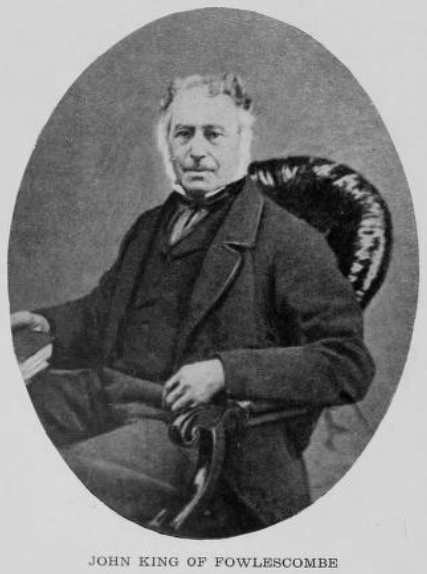
John King, Master of the South Devon Foxhounds

John King (died 1861) was Master of the South Devon Foxhounds for two years 1827-9, when they were known as "Mr. King's Hounds", having re-established the pack. In 1817 he purchased the nearby estate of Hayford, near Buckfastleigh, then a modest farmhouse with 162 acres, and spent a large sum on transforming it into a gentleman's residence and hunting lodge, by the addition of three wings. He borrowed money from Servington Savery (1787–1856), a solicitor and Receiver of Crown Rents in Modbury. In 1838 Savery foreclosed on the mortgage and entered into possession of Fowelscombe and also purchased from King the estate of Hayford. He stripped Fowelscombe of its fittings, including a Jacobean staircase, wooden panelling and a turret clock made in 1810 by Samuel Northcotte of Plymouth, which survives today at Hayford. In 1856 following a lengthy lawsuit, John King recovered possession of Fowelscombe from Savery, but was still in financial difficulties. After his death it was sold in 1865.

In 1836 John King was living in Hampshire and his tenant at Fowelscombe was a Mr Hosking, who looked after his hounds there. Also in 1836 the huntsman, Pinhay, "lives in Mr. King's house, at Fowlescombe, without paying rent, and his horse is kept in the stable at the kennel". According to Tozer (1916) John King died in 1841, whilst hunting with Mr. Trelawny's hounds on Dartmoor, but according to Podnieks & Chait he died in 1861.

The King family made valuable agricultural improvements at Fowelscombe and other estates in Ugborough and adjoining parishes for which "the county is greatly indebted". They were the last occupants of the manor house and after their departure it fell into ruins sometime between 1860 and 1880, and is today an ivy-clad ruin.

Later history
In 1890 the estate was bought by Rev. Gordon Walters. In 1919 it was split up and sold, with the remains of Fowelscombe House being included as part of the Bolterscombe estate farm which was sold to Reginald Nicholls. Bolterscombe and the ruins of the house were sold to the Burden family in 1948.

Richard Barker (1946–2015) purchased the estate in 1998 and began a restoration of Bolterscombe Farm, renamed as Fowlescombe Farm. As of 2018 it was an organic farm of nearly 300 acres, known as Fowlescombe.

== Architecture ==
The main building took the form of a hall house surrounded by parkland and a water garden. Although in ruins, it is Grade II listed. The 17th-century stable block was built around a courtyard, which may also have been the location of the kennels for the pack of hounds used for fox and deer hunting. The late 18th-century bridge leading to the manor house is also Grade II listed.
