= Country squire =

English country gentleman and rural landowner

A country squire was an English country gentleman, usually the chief landed proprietor in a parish and often its lord of the manor. The name was used partly as a courtesy title, partly as a description of his local standing. The country squires belonged to the landed gentry. They managed their estates, took part in the public business of the neighbourhood, and followed country sports. A squire involved with the parish was known as a parish squire.

The squire's old ascendancy faded during the nineteenth and twentieth centuries. Indebted estates passed into the hands of bankers, lawyers and traders, while elected councils took over the administrative business of the county magistrates. New owners often kept up the pursuits and public duties of their predecessors. By the late twentieth century the landed classes no longer dominated public life, although many families retained their estates. Some gentry families also preserved their fortunes through investments outside agriculture.

== Terminology and background ==
Squire is an abbreviated form of esquire, originally with the same meaning of an attendant on a knight. In the later Middle Ages, esquire became a customary description of holders of knight's fees who had not taken up their knighthood. The Encyclopædia Britannica of 1911 traced the custom of calling the principal landowner in a parish "the squire" to this usage.

The title was not confined to lords of manors. In some districts it was also given to small freeholders of the yeoman class. Esquire had wider uses as a title of honour and a form of address.

The term is used to translate similar notions from other languages: the French hobereau (can be pejorative), the German Junker, the Italian signorotto di campagna, and the Dutch landjonker.

== Historical development ==
In early modern England the landed gentry consisted of knights, baronets, esquires and untitled gentlemen, all ranking below the peerage. Joining the gentry required sufficient wealth, although long gentlemanly descent added prestige. Their income came chiefly from rents.

In the Tudor period, the Crown expected from the country gentlemen to take charge of the militia, sit as justices of the peace and serve as sheriffs. While some gentry still depended on nobility for patronage and office appointments, the demise of several noble houses in the sixteenth century gave the gentry greater freedom in running the local affairs.

The dissolution of the monasteries brought more land onto the market. Both new and established families bought it, although much of the former Church property enlarged existing estates. Rising prices encouraged landlords to raise rents and challenge customary tenures. Tenants sometimes combined to defend their customary rights in court.

The Civil War and Interregnum excluded many royalist and moderate parliamentarian gentlemen from office. After the Restoration of 1660, county administration and militia command rested chiefly with the gentry once more. During the eighteenth century, lesser local gentlemen took over some of the work of magistrates from greater landowners. A few frequently attending justices carried on much of the county bench's business. On the larger estates, increasing absences of the owners gave stewards and other local agents a greater share of their authority.

== Estate and community ==
In Richard Jefferies's sketches Hodge and His Masters (1880), estate business brought the squire into daily dealings with his tenants and servants. The squire of "The Squire's 'Round Robin'" received the farm bailiff, steward and gamekeeper in his study. They could come to a side door from the back without passing through the mansion. There was ash wood to be cut, oak bark not yet paid for, livestock to attend to, a roof that wanted fresh tiles, or a tenant asking for a new shed. Wet seasons and low prices brought trouble over rents. The tenants signed a memorial asking that a percentage be returned or the rent reduced. But whether his rents were large or small, the squire had the same expenses: members of another branch of the family to be paid in full, carriages, servants and gamekeepers to maintain.

Jefferies's "An Ambitious Squire" showed a young landowner setting about the improvement of his property. He ordered new buildings where personal inspection showed that they would pay. He killed off the rabbits and grubbed up the smaller coverts, patches of cover for game which the tenants thought injurious to crops. Labourers' cottages were repaired, marshy spots drained and cattle sheds put up, all without burdening the estate with a loan. The squire asked an increase in rent only where he had raised the value of the land.

== Public duties and influence ==
For squires appointed justices of the peace, the business of the estate was joined by that of the magistrates' bench. Jefferies's ambitious squire was nominated to the commission of the peace soon after succeeding to his property. The petty sessions, or local magistrates' courts, were in Jefferies's words "an informal weekly Parliament of local landowners", apart from their criminal business. At the board of guardians and other local boards, the young squire worked at details, sat upon committees, audited accounts and read reports.

Until elected county councils were established, the unpaid county magistrates carried on administrative work through committees of quarter sessions, without responsibility to any constituent body. In T. H. S. Escott's account of rural England before the reforms of 1894, the squire, the parish church and the village inn were the three centres of local life. The squire represented the State, though he might be an absentee.

== Domestic and social life ==
In the older manor houses discussed by P. H. Ditchfield in The Old English Country Squire (1912), the hall was the main feature of the squire's home. It gradually became merely an entrance or a passage. The owner no longer lived in common with his household; he and his family had retired to their own apartments, and the old uses of the hall ceased. The houses held family pictures, old furniture and works of art amassed by generations of squires.

Hunting, racing, shooting, cockfighting and prizefighting were among the pursuits of Ditchfield's sporting squires of the early nineteenth century. To the race meetings at county towns they flocked with their wives and daughters. There were plays in the theatre and balls in the town hall. The hunt, the county ball and the agricultural show still held their place in Escott's account of late-Victorian life. A squire might support the subscription pack of hounds and in time become its master, or serve as a judge of horses and cattle at the county show.

== Decline and survival ==
An estate burdened with mortgages and provision for widows might leave its owner little to spend. As Escott observed, a longer succession of bad seasons than usual, or one or two farms unexpectedly without tenants, could reduce the small squire to practical indigence if he had no income beyond his acres. Some removed their families to cheaper quarters in English towns or abroad. Others sold the estate to a lawyer, banker or trader from the county town, or to a manufacturer.

The life at the hall under its new proprietor often followed the old traditions. Escott's new squire, the banker, solicitor or brewer of yesterday, sent his son to the same school, the same college, or the same regiment as the son of his predecessor. He took his share of county business and country sport.

The Local Government Act 1888 established county councils. These took over the administrative duties formerly exercised by magistrates at quarter sessions, leaving their judicial functions untouched. Experienced county magistrates were elected to the new bodies; the work they had done on sessions committees continued in the councils. From 1894, parish councils and parish meetings gave villagers a further share in the management of their own affairs. Clergy and gentry took part in these deliberations alongside their parishioners and tenants.

The decline continued through the twentieth century. Writing in 1992, F. M. L. Thompson distinguished the landowners' loss of public influence from the fortunes of individual families and the survival of large estates. Mark Rothery's study of gentry wealth in Devon, Hertfordshire and Lincolnshire between 1870 and 1935 found that investments outside agriculture helped families maintain their personal wealth. Land sales could preserve a family's fortune even as its holdings shrank.

== Idealisation and criticism ==
In Ditchfield's portrait, the old squire looked after his estate himself and knew every tenant and labourer. He did not leave agents to work their own sweet will. Sons followed fathers as holders of the farms, and labourers served the same family for generations. Squire and peasant were, in Ditchfield's words, bound by "ties of sympathy and affection".

His ideal country squire built a little village school and paid the salary of the mistress. He took an active interest in clubs, allotments and benefit societies. This was a picture of an ideal, Ditchfield acknowledged, but "not altogether an imaginary one".

By 1912 Ditchfield feared for the old county families. He wrote that agricultural depression had "tried them sorely" and complained of the "ever-growing weight of rates and taxes". He lamented the fate of squires obliged to sell the homes of their ancestors.

In The Spectator, Sir Roger de Coverley was father and master of his domestics, who had grown old in his service. Henry Fielding's Tom Jones set Squire Allworthy, with his benevolent heart, against the boisterous, brutal Squire Western.

For Macaulay, the seventeenth-century squire's chief serious employment was the care of his property, his chief pleasures field sports. His education was scanty and his manners coarse. Ditchfield objected to this "wholesale condemnation" of the country gentlemen of England. In "Macaulay's Caricature" he drew upon the family papers of the Sitwells and Sacheverells to dispute it.

== See also ==
- American gentry – landowning elite in the southern British American colonies
- Junker – member of the landed nobility of Prussia
- Laird – Scottish estate owner
- Landed gentry in China – historical Chinese landowning elite
- Patroon – estate owner with manorial rights in New Netherland
- Polish landed gentry – Polish estate-owning class, known as ziemiaństwo
- Pomeshchik – Russian estate owner
- Seigneur – holder of a lordship in France and New France
- Zamindar – landholder in the Indian subcontinent
